= List of members of the parliament of Ukraine, 2019–present =

The 9th Ukrainian Verkhovna Rada began its term on 29 August 2019. 424 people's deputies were elected during the 2019 Ukrainian parliamentary elections. As of 18 July 2026, there are 390 people's deputies.

== Party list People's Deputies ==
Party list number	Deputy	Assumed office	Born
Servant of the People, No. 1 (Note: Currently a member of Smart Politics (Ukraine).)	Dmytro Razumkov	2019	8 October 1983 (age 42)
Servant of the People, No. 2 (Note: Currently nonpartisan as Chairman of the Verkhovna Rada.)	Ruslan Stefanchuk	2019	29 October 1975 (age 50)
Servant of the People, No. 3	Vacant		
Servant of the People, No. 4	Davyd Arakhamia	2019	23 May 1979 (age 47)
Servant of the People, No. 5	Halyna Yanchenko	2019	29 April 1988 (age 38)
Servant of the People, No. 6	Vacant		
Servant of the People, No. 7	Oleksandr Kornienko	2019	12 May 1984 (age 42)
Servant of the People, No. 8	Anastasiya Radina	2019	23 June 1984 (age 42)
Servant of the People, No. 9	Vacant		
Servant of the People, No. 10	Zhan Beleniuk	2019	24 January 1991 (age 35)
Servant of the People, No. 11	Serhiy Babak	2019	31 July 1978 (age 47)
Servant of the People, No. 12	Vacant		
Servant of the People, No. 13	Olena Shuliak	2019	24 January 1976 (age 50)
Servant of the People, No. 14	Dmytro Natalukha	2019	15 September 1987 (age 38)
Servant of the People, No. 15	Yelyzaveta Yasko	2019	17 October 1990 (age 35)
Servant of the People, No. 16	Vacant		
Servant of the People, No. 17	Andriy Herus	2019	18 March 1982 (age 44)
Servant of the People, No. 18	Mykhailo Radutskyi	2019	5 December 1968 (age 57)
Servant of the People, No. 19	Vacant		
Servant of the People, No. 20	Danylo Hetmantsev	2019	26 April 1978 (age 48)
Servant of the People, No. 21	Vacant		
Servant of the People, No. 22	Vacant		
Servant of the People, No. 23	Heo Leros	2019	24 April 1989 (age 37)
Servant of the People, No. 24	Serhiy Kalchenko	2019	30 December 1964 (age 61)
Servant of the People, No. 25	Maksym Tkachenko	2019	24 January 1983 (age 43)
Servant of the People, No. 26	Yehor Cherniev	2019	5 February 1985 (age 41)
Servant of the People, No. 27	Sviatoslav Yurash	2019	16 February 1996 (age 30)
Servant of the People, No. 28	Pavlo Sushko	2019	16 November 1979 (age 46)
Servant of the People, No. 29	Vacant		
Servant of the People, No. 30	Vacant		
Servant of the People, No. 31	Vacant		
Servant of the People, No. 32	Yulia Didenko	2019	8 May 1978 (age 48)
Servant of the People, No. 33	Dmytro Solomchuk	2019	1 October 1980 (age 45)
Servant of the People, No. 34	Mykhailo Ananchenko	2019	1 October 1980 (age 45)
Servant of the People, No. 35	Vacant		
Servant of the People, No. 36	Vladlen Nekliudov	2019	13 October 1973 (age 52)
Servant of the People, No. 37	Ihor Kryvosheiev	2019	2 June 1985 (age 41)
Servant of the People, No. 38	Serhiy Ionushas	2019	18 October 1979 (age 46)
Servant of the People, No. 39	Oleksandr Zavitnevych	2019	19 April 1973 (age 53)
Servant of the People, No. 40	Vadym Strunevych	2019	24 November 1982 (age 43)
Servant of the People, No. 41	Volodymyr Voronov	2019	23 August 1978 (age 47)
Servant of the People, No. 42	Vacant		
Servant of the People, No. 43	Yuriy Kisiel	2019	28 February 1963 (age 63)
Servant of the People, No. 44	Vadym Halaichuk	2019	14 February 1971 (age 55)
Servant of the People, No. 45	Artem Kovalov	2019	2 March 1984 (age 42)
Servant of the People, No. 46	Valeriy Sterniychuk	2019	18 June 1981 (age 45)
Servant of the People, No. 47	Halyna Mykhailiuk	2019	14 June 1987 (age 39)
Servant of the People, No. 48	Roman Babiy	2019	6 July 1977 (age 49)
Servant of the People, No. 49	Oleksandr Kachura	2019	18 August 1990 (age 35)
Servant of the People, No. 50	Vacant		
Servant of the People, No. 51	Artem Kultenko	2019	8 January 1984 (age 42)
Servant of the People, No. 52	Oleh Marusiak	2019	24 September 1968 (age 57)
Servant of the People, No. 53	Mykola Kyrychenko	2019	12 December 1983 (age 42)
Servant of the People, No. 54	Halyna Tretiakova	2019	21 January 1963 (age 63)
Servant of the People, No. 55	Pavlo Khalimon	2019	10 June 1983 (age 43)
Servant of the People, No. 56	Olena Moshenets	2019	6 March 1983 (age 43)
Servant of the People, No. 57	Olha Saladukha	2019	4 June 1983 (age 43)
Servant of the People, No. 58	Olha Koval	2019	17 June 1991 (age 35)
Servant of the People, No. 59	Alina Zahoruiko	2019	11 April 1984 (age 42)
Servant of the People, No. 60	Oleh Bondarenko	2019	3 November 1975 (age 50)
Servant of the People, No. 61	Mykhailo Kriachko	2019	24 May 1980 (age 46)
Servant of the People, No. 62	Maryna Bardina	2019	17 December 1992 (age 33)
Servant of the People, No. 63	Liudmyla Marchenko	2019	28 March 1983 (age 43)
Servant of the People, No. 64	Ivan Yunakov	2019	28 January 1984 (age 42)
Servant of the People, No. 65	Daria Volodina	2019	16 April 1991 (age 35)
Servant of the People, No. 66	Olha Savchenko	2019	7 June 1989 (age 37)
Servant of the People, No. 67	Oksana Hrynchuk	2019	20 June 1979 (age 47)
Servant of the People, No. 68	Volodymyr Kozak	2019	9 June 1984 (age 42)
Servant of the People, No. 70	Oleksandr Sova	2019	29 May 1972 (age 54)
Servant of the People, No. 71	Vacant		
Servant of the People, No. 72	Volodymyr Vatras	2019	12 February 1980 (age 46)
Servant of the People, No. 73	Roman Mulyk	2019	18 June 1973 (age 53)
Servant of the People, No. 74	Oleh Tarasov	2019	26 February 1984 (age 42)
Servant of the People, No. 75	Anatoliy Kostiukh	2019	25 March 1988 (age 38)
Servant of the People, No. 76	Yevheniy Brahar	2019	30 May 1994 (age 32)
Servant of the People, No. 77	Vitaliy Bezhin	2019	18 April 1990 (age 36)
Servant of the People, No. 78	Vacant		
Servant of the People, No. 79	Oleksandr Saliychuk	2019	25 February 1987 (age 39)
Servant of the People, No. 80	Ella Repina	2019	17 November 1973 (age 52)
Servant of the People, No. 81	Arseniy Pushkarenko	2019	10 October 1992 (age 33)
Servant of the People, No. 82	Marian Zablotskyi	2019	21 September 1985 (age 40)
Servant of the People, No. 83	Andriy Klochko	2019	16 March 1981 (age 45)
Servant of the People, No. 84	Yulia Ovchynnykova	2019	24 March 1985 (age 41)
Servant of the People, No. 85	Oleksandr Merezhko	2019	14 February 1971 (age 55)
Servant of the People, No. 86	Oleksiy Ustenko	2019	7 April 1994 (age 32)
Servant of the People, No. 87	Oleksandr Kabanov	2019	6 August 1973 (age 52)
Servant of the People, No. 88	Fedir Venislavskyi	2019	16 May 1969 (age 57)
Servant of the People, No. 89	Lada Bulakh	2019	11 February 1976 (age 50)
Servant of the People, No. 90	Yevhen Petruniak	2019	24 July 1977 (age 48)
Servant of the People, No. 91	Oleksandr Marikovskyi	2019	18 September 1982 (age 43)
Servant of the People, No. 92	Oleksandr Fediyenko	2019	20 April 1972 (age 54)
Servant of the People, No. 93	Andriy Motovylovets	2019	29 April 1982 (age 44)
Servant of the People, No. 94	Anna Kolisnyk	2019	24 October 1994 (age 31)
Servant of the People, No. 95	Yelyzaveta Bohutska	2019	14 April 1964 (age 62)
Servant of the People, No. 96	Artem Nahaievskyi	2019	24 January 1983 (age 43)
Servant of the People, No. 97	Mykyta Poturaiev	2019	4 September 1970 (age 55)
Servant of the People, No. 98	Pavlo Yakymenko	2019	8 November 1989 (age 36)
Servant of the People, No. 99	Vacant		
Servant of the People, No. 100	Artem Kunaiev	2019	29 April 1992 (age 34)
Servant of the People, No. 101	Dmytro Pryputen	2019	23 May 1986 (age 40)
Servant of the People, No. 102	Maksym Pavliuk	2019	3 June 1992 (age 34)
Servant of the People, No. 103	Vasyl Mokan	2019	19 April 1985 (age 41)
Servant of the People, No. 104	Roksolana Pidlasa	2019	25 January 1994 (age 32)
Servant of the People, No. 105	Bohdan Torokhtiy	2019	9 June 1984 (age 42)
Servant of the People, No. 106	Oksana Dmytriyeva	2019	26 April 1980 (age 46)
Servant of the People, No. 107	Marharyta Shol	2019	15 March 1988 (age 38)
Servant of the People, No. 108	Vacant		
Servant of the People, No. 109	Ruslan Horbenko	2019	19 July 1989 (age 36)
Servant of the People, No. 110	Andriy Zhupanyn	2019	12 March 1979 (age 47)
Servant of the People, No. 111	Rostyslav Tistyk	2019	9 October 1993 (age 32)
Servant of the People, No. 112	Yevheniya Kravchuk	2019	23 December 1985 (age 40)
Servant of the People, No. 113	Nelli Yakovlieva	2019	21 June 1985 (age 41)
Servant of the People, No. 114	Serhiy Hryvko	2019	12 December 1985 (age 40)
Servant of the People, No. 115	Petro Pavlovskyi	2019	15 October 1981 (age 44)
Servant of the People, No. 116	Vacant		
Servant of the People, No. 117	Olena Vintoniak	2019	29 March 1979 (age 47)
Servant of the People, No. 118	Yuriy Zaslavskyi	2019	6 March 1982 (age 44)
Servant of the People, No. 119	Andriy Zadorozhnyi	2019	21 May 1968 (age 58)
Servant of the People, No. 120	Ostap Shypaylo	2019	7 January 1989 (age 37)
Servant of the People, No. 121	Ivan Shynkarenko	2019	1 October 1986 (age 39)
Servant of the People, No. 122	Vacant		
Servant of the People, No. 123	Volodymyr Kreidenko	2019	8 May 1987 (age 39)
Servant of the People, No. 124	Taras Tarasenko	2019	26 July 1980 (age 45)
Servant of the People, No. 125	Vacant		
Servant of the People, No. 126	Pavlo Frolov	2019	1 September 1976 (age 49)
Servant of the People, No. 127	Mykhailo Novikov	2019	15 November 1965 (age 60)
Servant of the People, No. 128	Viktoriya Podhorna	2019	10 February 1969 (age 57)
Servant of the People, No. 129	Olena Khomenko	2019	7 December 1975 (age 50)
Servant of the People, No. 130	Anatoliy Ostapenko	2019	1 February 1968 (age 58)
Servant of the People, No. 131	Tetiana Tsyba	2019	15 April 1977 (age 49)
Servant of the People, No. 132	Ivan Kalaur	2019	4 July 1968 (age 58)
Servant of the People, No. 133	Yulia Hryshyna	2019	16 June 1978 (age 48)
Servant of the People, No. 134	Olha Rudenko	2019	29 May 1979 (age 47)
Servant of the People, No. 135	Oleksandr Kopylenko	2019	26 June 1961 (age 65)
Servant of the People, No. 136	Serhiy Mandziy	2019	28 November 1974 (age 51)
Servant of the People, No. 137	Oleksandr Sanchenko	2020	11 September 1988 (age 37)
Servant of the People, No. 138	Denys Maslov	2020	1 August 1983 (age 42)
Servant of the People, No. 139	Anton Shvachko	2021	11 December 1992 (age 33)
Servant of the People, No. 140	Serhiy Kostriychuk	2021	7 June 1985 (age 41)
Servant of the People, No. 141	Oleksandr Bolzhkov	2022	1988 (aged 33–34)
Servant of the People, No. 142	Vacant		
Servant of the People, No. 143	Oleksandr Vasiuk	2022	28 December 1994 (age 31)
Servant of the People, No. 144	Vacant		
Servant of the People, No. 145	Valentyna Korolenko	2022	15 May 1984 (age 42)
Opposition Platform — For Life, (Note: Party non-existent since 2022.) No. 1	Yuriy Boyko	2014	9 October 1958 (age 67)
Opposition Platform — For Life, No. 2	Vacant		
Opposition Platform — For Life, No. 3	Vacant		
Opposition Platform — For Life, No. 4	Vacant		
Opposition Platform — For Life, No. 5	Serhiy Lyovochkin	2014	17 July 1972 (age 54)
Opposition Platform — For Life, No. 6	Vasyl Nimchenko	2014	13 September 1950 (age 75)
Opposition Platform — For Life, No. 7	Nestor Shufrych	2007	29 December 1966 (age 59)
Opposition Platform — For Life, No. 8	Serhiy Larin	2007	11 January 1962 (age 64)
Opposition Platform — For Life, No. 9	Serhiy Dunaiev	2007	19 August 1973 (age 52)
Opposition Platform — For Life, No. 10	Vacant		
Opposition Platform — For Life, No. 11	Vadym Stolar	2019	6 April 1972 (age 54)
Opposition Platform — For Life, No. 12	Yuliy Ioffe	2012	10 December 1940 (age 85)
Opposition Platform — For Life, No. 13	Mykhailo Papiyev	2014	1 October 1960 (age 65)
Opposition Platform — For Life, No. 14	Vacant		
Opposition Platform — For Life, No. 15	Dmytro Isaienko	2019	30 August 1967 (age 58)
Opposition Platform — For Life, No. 16	Mykola Skoryk	2014	27 November 1972 (age 53)
Opposition Platform — For Life, No. 17	Hryhoriy Surkis	2019	4 June 1949 (age 77)
Opposition Platform — For Life, No. 18	Ihor Kisilov	2019	2 December 1984 (age 41)
Opposition Platform — For Life, No. 19	Ihor Zahorodnyi	2019	7 May 1959 (age 67)
Opposition Platform — For Life, No. 20	Anatoliy Burmich	2019	13 August 1962 (age 63)
Opposition Platform — For Life, No. 21	Vacant		
Opposition Platform — For Life, No. 22	Oleksandr Koltunovych	2019	4 November 1987 (age 38)
Opposition Platform — For Life, No. 23	Hryhoriy Mamka	2019	18 August 1974 (age 51)
Opposition Platform — For Life, No. 24	Volodymyr Kaltsev	2019	16 June 1966 (age 60)
Opposition Platform — For Life, No. 25	Yuriy Pavlenko	2014	20 March 1975 (age 51)
Opposition Platform — For Life, No. 26	Natalia Prykhodko	2019	29 October 1981 (age 44)
Opposition Platform — For Life, No. 27	Viktor Chornyi	2019	6 April 1968 (age 58)
Opposition Platform — For Life, No. 28	Vitaly Bort	2019	1 September 1972 (age 53)
Opposition Platform — For Life, No. 29	Mykhailo Makarenko	2019	9 April 1950 (age 76)
Opposition Platform — For Life, No. 30	Vacant		
Opposition Platform — For Life, No. 31	Vacant		
Opposition Platform — For Life, No. 32	Oleksandr Puzanov	2019	26 February 1977 (age 49)
Opposition Platform — For Life, No. 33	Suto Mamoian	2019	2 December 1981 (age 44)
Opposition Platform — For Life, No. 34	Vacant		
Opposition Platform — For Life, No. 35	Vacant		
Opposition Platform — For Life, No. 36	Oleksandr Kachnyi	2019	23 October 1968 (age 57)
Opposition Platform — For Life, No. 37	Antonina Slavytska	2019	30 April 1988 (age 38)
Batkivshchyna, No. 1	Yulia Tymoshenko	2014	27 November 1960 (age 65)
Batkivshchyna, No. 2	Serhiy Taruta	2014	22 July 1955 (age 70)
Batkivshchyna, No. 3	Valentyn Nalyvaichenko	2014	8 June 1966 (age 60)
Batkivshchyna, No. 4	Serhiy Sobolyev	2014	5 September 1961 (age 64)
Batkivshchyna, No. 5	Olena Kondratiuk	2014	17 November 1970 (age 55)
Batkivshchyna, No. 6	Ivan Kyrylenko	2014	2 October 1956 (age 69)
Batkivshchyna, No. 7	Andriy Kozhemiakin	2014	13 November 1965 (age 60)
Batkivshchyna, No. 8	Hryhoriy Nemyria	2014	8 June 1966 (age 60)
Batkivshchyna, No. 9	Serhiy Vlasenko	2014	7 March 1967 (age 59)
Batkivshchyna, No. 10	Valeriy Dubil	2014	26 September 1973 (age 52)
Batkivshchyna, No. 11	Oleksandr Abdullin	1998	29 June 1962 (age 64)
Batkivshchyna, No. 12	Ivan Krulko	2014	20 July 1981 (age 44)
Batkivshchyna, No. 13	Anzhelika Labunska	2019	2 November 1967 (age 58)
Batkivshchyna, No. 14	Konstantin Bondarev	2019	13 September 1972 (age 53)
Batkivshchyna, No. 15	Mykhailo Tsymbaliuk	2019	21 November 1964 (age 61)
Batkivshchyna, No. 16	Vitaliy Danilov	2019	10 June 1967 (age 59)
Batkivshchyna, No. 17	Vacant		
Batkivshchyna, No. 18	Oleksiy Kucherenko	2019	3 April 1961 (age 65)
Batkivshchyna, No. 19	Andriy Nikolayenko	2019	23 June 1979 (age 47)
Batkivshchyna, No. 20	Mykhailo Volynets	2019	30 October 1956 (age 69)
Batkivshchyna, No. 21	Andriy Puziychuk	2019	13 June 1978 (age 48)
Batkivshchyna, No. 22	Vacant		
Batkivshchyna, No. 23	Volodymyr Kabachenko	2019	1 July 1987 (age 39)
Batkivshchyna, No. 24	Vadym Ivchenko	2014	29 January 1980 (age 46)
Batkivshchyna, No. 25	Serhiy Yevtushok	2020	27 November 1973 (age 52)
European Solidarity, No. 1	Petro Poroshenko	2019	26 September 1965 (age 60)
European Solidarity, No. 2	Vacant		
European Solidarity, No. 3	Iryna Herashchenko	2007	15 May 1971 (age 55)
European Solidarity, No. 4	Vacant		
European Solidarity, No. 5	Sofiia Fedyna	2019	18 February 1984 (age 42)
European Solidarity, No. 6	Mustafa Dzhemilev	2019	13 November 1943 (age 82)
European Solidarity, No. 7	Yana Zinkevych	2019	2 July 1995 (age 31)
European Solidarity, No. 8	Ahtem Chiygoz	2019	14 December 1964 (age 61)
European Solidarity, No. 9	Oleh Synyutka	2019	14 February 1970 (age 56)
European Solidarity, No. 10	Ivanna Klympush-Tsintsadze	2019	5 July 1972 (age 54)
European Solidarity, No. 11	Artur Herasymov	2014	23 August 1972 (age 53)
European Solidarity, No. 12	Stepan Kubiv	2019	16 March 1962 (age 64)
European Solidarity, No. 13	Iryna Friz	2014	25 September 1974 (age 51)
European Solidarity, No. 14	Nina Yuzhanina	2014	11 January 1965 (age 61)
European Solidarity, No. 15	Vacant		
European Solidarity, No. 16	Viktoria Siumar	2014	23 October 1977 (age 48)
European Solidarity, No. 17	Volodymyr Ariev	2007	31 March 1975 (age 51)
European Solidarity, No. 18	Rostyslav Pavlenko	2012	19 August 1976 (age 49)
European Solidarity, No. 19	Mykola Velychkovych	2014	18 November 1972 (age 53)
European Solidarity, No. 20	Serhiy Alieksieiev	2014	9 February 1977 (age 49)
European Solidarity, No. 21	Ruslan Kniazevych	2006	28 June 1974 (age 52)
European Solidarity, No. 22	Maksym Savrasov	2016	7 August 1980 (age 45)
European Solidarity, No. 23	Mariya Ionova	2014	31 May 1978 (age 48)
European Solidarity, No. 24	Vacant		
European Solidarity, No. 25	Volodymyr Viatrovych	2019	7 June 1977 (age 49)
Holos, No. 1	Vacant		
Holos, No. 2	Yulia Klymenko	2019	5 October 1976 (age 49)
Holos, No. 3	Kira Rudyk	2019	14 October 1985 (age 40)
Holos, No. 4	Yaroslav Zheleznyak	2019	8 September 1976 (age 49)
Holos, No. 5	Oleksandra Ustinova	2019	2 October 1985 (age 40)
Holos, No. 6	Oleh Makarov	2019	24 July 1965 (age 60)
Holos, No. 7	Yaroslav Yurchyshyn	2019	14 October 1980 (age 45)
Holos, No. 8	Serhiy Rakhmanin	2019	17 April 1969 (age 57)
Holos, No. 9	Solomiia Bobrovska	2019	20 December 1989 (age 36)
Holos, No. 10	Olha Stefanyshyna	2019	14 May 1983 (age 43)
Holos, No. 11	Vacant		
Holos, No. 12	Volodymyr Tsabal	2019	25 April 1985 (age 41)
Holos, No. 13	Andriy Osadchuk	2019	20 November 1971 (age 54)
Holos, No. 14	Roman Kostenko	2019	21 October 1983 (age 42)
Holos, No. 15	Roman Lozynskyi	2019	20 January 1994 (age 32)
Holos, No. 16	Inna Sovsun	2019	21 September 1984 (age 41)
Holos, No. 17	Lesia Vasylenko	2019	31 March 1987 (age 39)
Holos, No. 18	Vacant		
Holos, No. 19	Vacant		
Holos, No. 20	Andriy Sharaskin	2020	20 September 1977 (age 48)
Holos, No. 21	Vacant		
Holos, No. 22	Maksym Khlapuk	2022	20 July 1984 (age 41)

== Single-mandate district People's Deputies ==
Oblast	District	Deputy	Party	Assumed office	Born
Autonomous Republic of Crimea	No. 1	Occupied by Russia since 2014; see Annexation of Crimea by the Russian Federation			
Autonomous Republic of Crimea	No. 2	Occupied by Russia since 2014; see Annexation of Crimea by the Russian Federation			
Autonomous Republic of Crimea	No. 3	Occupied by Russia since 2014; see Annexation of Crimea by the Russian Federation			
Autonomous Republic of Crimea	No. 4	Occupied by Russia since 2014; see Annexation of Crimea by the Russian Federation			
Autonomous Republic of Crimea	No. 5	Occupied by Russia since 2014; see Annexation of Crimea by the Russian Federation			
Autonomous Republic of Crimea	No. 6	Occupied by Russia since 2014; see Annexation of Crimea by the Russian Federation			
Autonomous Republic of Crimea	No. 7	Occupied by Russia since 2014; see Annexation of Crimea by the Russian Federation			
Autonomous Republic of Crimea	No. 8	Occupied by Russia since 2014; see Annexation of Crimea by the Russian Federation			
Autonomous Republic of Crimea	No. 9	Occupied by Russia since 2014; see Annexation of Crimea by the Russian Federation			
Autonomous Republic of Crimea	No. 10	Occupied by Russia since 2014; see Annexation of Crimea by the Russian Federation			
Vinnytsia Oblast	No. 11	Maksym Pashkovskyi	Servant of the People	2019	24 March 1983 (age 43)
Vinnytsia Oblast	No. 12	Anatoliy Drabovskyi	Servant of the People	2019	1 August 1958 (age 67)
Vinnytsia Oblast	No. 13	Petro Yurchyshyn	Independent	2014	13 July 1958 (age 68)
Vinnytsia Oblast	No. 14	Iryna Borzova	Servant of the People	2019	28 August 1982 (age 43)
Vinnytsia Oblast	No. 15	Larysa Bilozir	Dovira (Note: Elected as an independent.)	2019	24 September 1981 (age 44)
Vinnytsia Oblast	No. 16	Hennadii Vatsak	Dovira	2019	9 February 1972 (age 54)
Vinnytsia Oblast	No. 17	Mykola Kucher	Dovira	2014	24 August 1959 (age 66)
Vinnytsia Oblast	No. 18	Oleh Meidych	Batkivshchyna	2019	24 November 1970 (age 55)
Volyn Oblast	No. 19	Ihor Huz	Independent	2014	11 January 1982 (age 44)
Volyn Oblast	No. 20	Viacheslav Rublyov	Servant of the People	2019	25 February 1979 (age 47)
Volyn Oblast	No. 21	Stepan Ivakhiv	For the Future	2012	24 January 1968 (age 58)
Volyn Oblast	No. 22	Ihor Palytsia	For the Future	2012	10 December 1972 (age 53)
Volyn Oblast	No. 23	Iryna Konstankevych	For the Future	2016	23 June 1965 (age 61)
Dnipropetrovsk Oblast	No. 24	Dmytro Kysylevskyi	Servant of the People	2019	23 April 1983 (age 43)
Dnipropetrovsk Oblast	No. 25	Maksym Buzhanskyi	Servant of the People	2019	24 November 1974 (age 51)
Dnipropetrovsk Oblast	No. 26	Kyryll Nesterenko	Servant of the People	2019	8 February 1993 (age 33)
Dnipropetrovsk Oblast	No. 27	Viacheslav Medianyk	Servant of the People	2019	3 August 1987 (age 38)
Dnipropetrovsk Oblast	No. 28	Yuriy Mysiahin	Servant of the People	2019	21 June 1974 (age 52)
Dnipropetrovsk Oblast	No. 29	Serhiy Demchenko	Servant of the People	2019	13 June 1976 (age 50)
Dnipropetrovsk Oblast	No. 30	Hanna Lichman	Servant of the People	2019	31 January 1978 (age 48)
Dnipropetrovsk Oblast	No. 31	Volodymyr Zakharchenko	Servant of the People	2019	27 January 1971 (age 55)
Dnipropetrovsk Oblast	No. 32	Olena Kryvoruchkina	Servant of the People	2019	18 October 1971 (age 54)
Dnipropetrovsk Oblast	No. 33	Yuriy Koriavchenkov	Servant of the People	2019	26 November 1974 (age 51)
Dnipropetrovsk Oblast	No. 34	Dmytro Chornyi	Servant of the People	2019	14 October 1989 (age 36)
Dnipropetrovsk Oblast	No. 35	Denys Herman	Servant of the People	2019	8 August 1981 (age 44)
Dnipropetrovsk Oblast	No. 36	Roman Kaptielov	Servant of the People	2019	16 March 1980 (age 46)
Dnipropetrovsk Oblast	No. 37	Dmytro Shpenov	Independent	2012	20 December 1978 (age 47)
Dnipropetrovsk Oblast	No. 38	Vladyslav Borodin	Servant of the People	2019	18 June 1971 (age 55)
Dnipropetrovsk Oblast	No. 39	Serhiy Severyn	Servant of the People	2019	20 June 1980 (age 46)
Dnipropetrovsk Oblast	No. 40	Oleksandr Trukhin	Servant of the People	2019	10 November 1986 (age 39)
Donetsk Oblast	No. 41	Occupied by Russia since 2014; see Russian occupation of Donetsk Oblast			
Donetsk Oblast	No. 42	Occupied by Russia since 2014; see Russian occupation of Donetsk Oblast			
Donetsk Oblast	No. 43	Occupied by Russia since 2014; see Russian occupation of Donetsk Oblast			
Donetsk Oblast	No. 44	Occupied by Russia since 2014; see Russian occupation of Donetsk Oblast			
Donetsk Oblast	No. 45	Musa Mahomedov	Independent (Note: Elected as a member of Opposition Bloc.)	2019	7 April 1970 (age 56)
Donetsk Oblast	No. 46	Fedir Khrystenko	Independent (Note: Elected as a member of Opposition Platform — For Life.)	2019	11 October 1983 (age 42)
Donetsk Oblast	No. 47	Yuriy Solod	Platform for Life and Peace	2014	27 April 1972 (age 54)
Donetsk Oblast	No. 48	Maxim Efimov	Restoration of Ukraine	2014	1 November 1974 (age 51)
Donetsk Oblast	No. 49	Valerii Hnatenko	Restoration of Ukraine	2019	3 February 1967 (age 59)
Donetsk Oblast	No. 50	Andriy Aksyonov	Independent	2021	2 February 1971 (age 55)
Donetsk Oblast	No. 51	Oleksandr Kovalov	Restoration of Ukraine	2019	7 October 1967 (age 58)
Donetsk Oblast	No. 52	Yevhen Yakovenko	Independent (Note: Elected as a member of Batkivshchyna.)	2019	6 June 1965 (age 61)
Donetsk Oblast	No. 53	Occupied by Russia since 2014; see Russian occupation of Donetsk Oblast			
Donetsk Oblast	No. 54	Occupied by Russia since 2014; see Russian occupation of Donetsk Oblast			
Donetsk Oblast	No. 55	Occupied by Russia since 2014; see Russian occupation of Donetsk Oblast			
Donetsk Oblast	No. 56	Occupied by Russia since 2014; see Russian occupation of Donetsk Oblast			
Donetsk Oblast	No. 57	Vacant			
Donetsk Oblast	No. 58	Serhiy Mahera	Independent	2019	8 November 1956 (age 69)
Donetsk Oblast	No. 59	Volodymyr Moroz	Restoration of Ukraine	2019	24 October 1967 (age 58)
Donetsk Oblast	No. 60	Vacant			
Donetsk Oblast	No. 61	Occupied by Russia since 2014; see Russian occupation of Donetsk Oblast			
Zhytomyr Oblast	No. 62	Ihor Herasymenko	Servant of the People	2019	5 January 1984 (age 42)
Zhytomyr Oblast	No. 63	Bohdan Kytsak	Servant of the People	2019	2 March 1992 (age 34)
Zhytomyr Oblast	No. 64	Volodymyr Areshonkov	Dovira	2014	27 December 1957 (age 68)
Zhytomyr Oblast	No. 65	Dmytro Kostiuk	Servant of the People	2019	1 June 1993 (age 33)
Zhytomyr Oblast	No. 66	Tetiana Hryshchenko	Servant of the People	2019	27 August 1979 (age 46)
Zhytomyr Oblast	No. 67	Serhiy Kuzminykh	Servant of the People	2019	17 January 1983 (age 43)
Zakarpattia Oblast	No. 68	Robert Horvat	Dovira	2014	17 February 1969 (age 57)
Zakarpattia Oblast	No. 69	Viktor Baloha	Andriy Baloha's Team	2012	15 June 1963 (age 63)
Zakarpattia Oblast	No. 70	Mykhailo Laba	Servant of the People	2019	29 October 1975 (age 50)
Zakarpattia Oblast	No. 71	Valerii Lunchenko	Dovira	2012	13 October 1982 (age 43)
Zakarpattia Oblast	No. 72	Vasyl Petiovka	Dovira	2012	30 January 1967 (age 59)
Zakarpattia Oblast	No. 73	Vladislav Poliak	Dovira	2019	10 August 1975 (age 50)
Zaporizhzhia Oblast	No. 74	Hennadiy Kasai	Servant of the People	2019	28 November 1972 (age 53)
Zaporizhzhia Oblast	No. 75	Roman Sokha	Servant of the People	2019	18 October 1975 (age 50)
Zaporizhzhia Oblast	No. 76	Yevheniy Shevchenko	Independent (Note: Elected as a member of Servant of the People.)	2019	4 May 1972 (age 54)
Zaporizhzhia Oblast	No. 77	Serhiy Shtepa	Servant of the People	2019	30 April 1990 (age 36)
Zaporizhzhia Oblast	No. 78	Oleksandr Ponomarov	Platform for Life and Peace	2012	7 January 1962 (age 64)
Zaporizhzhia Oblast	No. 79	Yulia Yatsyk	Servant of the People	2019	14 August 1979 (age 46)
Zaporizhzhia Oblast	No. 80	Serhii Minko	For the Future	2019	20 September 1973 (age 52)
Zaporizhzhia Oblast	No. 81	Pavlo Melnyk	Servant of the People	2019	26 June 1984 (age 42)
Zaporizhzhia Oblast	No. 82	Maryna Nikitina	Servant of the People	2019	16 April 1986 (age 40)
Ivano-Frankivsk Oblast	No. 83	Oksana Savchuk	Svoboda	2019	20 March 1983 (age 43)
Ivano-Frankivsk Oblast	No. 84	Ihor Fris	Servant of the People	2019	29 June 1973 (age 53)
Ivano-Frankivsk Oblast	No. 85	Eduard Proshchuk	Servant of the People	2019	19 February 1982 (age 44)
Ivano-Frankivsk Oblast	No. 86	Oleksandr Matusevych	Servant of the People	2019	20 March 1974 (age 52)
Ivano-Frankivsk Oblast	No. 87	Vasyl Virastyuk	Servant of the People	2019	22 April 1974 (age 52)
Ivano-Frankivsk Oblast	No. 88	Andriy Ivanchuk	Dovira	2019	16 June 1973 (age 53)
Ivano-Frankivsk Oblast	No. 89	Volodymyr Tymofiychuk	Servant of the People	2019	17 February 1986 (age 40)
Kyiv Oblast	No. 90	Mykola Babenko	Dovira (Note: Elected as a member of Bila Tserkva Together.)	2019	17 March 1980 (age 46)
Kyiv Oblast	No. 91	Oleh Dunda	Servant of the People	2019	6 March 1980 (age 46)
Kyiv Oblast	No. 92	Valeriy Koliukh	Servant of the People	2019	18 April 1973 (age 53)
Kyiv Oblast	No. 93	Anna Skorokhod	For the Future	2019	14 January 1990 (age 36)
Kyiv Oblast	No. 94	Oleksandr Dubinsky	Independent	2019	18 April 1981 (age 45)
Kyiv Oblast	No. 95	Oleksandr Horobets	Servant of the People	2019	15 February 1978 (age 48)
Kyiv Oblast	No. 96	Olha Vasylevska-Smahliuk	Servant of the People	2019	23 June 1985 (age 41)
Kyiv Oblast	No. 97	Mykola Halushko	Servant of the People	2019	5 December 1979 (age 46)
Kyiv Oblast	No. 98	Serhii Bunin	Servant of the People	2019	3 May 1971 (age 55)
Kirovohrad Oblast	No. 99	Oleksandr Danutsa	Servant of the People	2019	29 January 1980 (age 46)
Kirovohrad Oblast	No. 100	Ihor Murdiy	Servant of the People	2019	8 August 1982 (age 43)
Kirovohrad Oblast	No. 101	Yuriy Kuzbyt	Servant of the People	2019	29 March 1977 (age 49)
Kirovohrad Oblast	No. 102	Oles Dovhiy	Independent	2014	1 November 1980 (age 45)
Kirovohrad Oblast	No. 103	Oleh Voronko	Restoration of Ukraine	2019	15 May 1974 (age 52)
Luhansk Oblast	No. 104	Occupied by Russia since 2014; see Russian occupation of Luhansk Oblast			
Luhansk Oblast	No. 105	Viktoriya Hryb	Independent	2019	19 June 1968 (age 58)
Luhansk Oblast	No. 106	Oleksiy Kuznyetsov	Servant of the People	2019	2 December 1972 (age 53)
Luhansk Oblast	No. 107	Oleksandr Sukhov	Dovira (Note: Elected as a member of Our Land.)	2019	20 May 1984 (age 42)
Luhansk Oblast	No. 108	Occupied by Russia since 2014; see Russian occupation of Luhansk Oblast			
Luhansk Oblast	No. 109	Occupied by Russia since 2014; see Russian occupation of Luhansk Oblast			
Luhansk Oblast	No. 110	Occupied by Russia since 2014; see Russian occupation of Luhansk Oblast			
Luhansk Oblast	No. 111	Occupied by Russia since 2014; see Russian occupation of Luhansk Oblast			
Luhansk Oblast	No. 112	Serhiy Velmozhnyi	Dovira	2019	25 June 1976 (age 50)
Luhansk Oblast	No. 113	Oleksandr Lukashev	Restoration of Ukraine	2019	1 April 1976 (age 50)
Luhansk Oblast	No. 114	Serhii Shakhov	Dovira	2016	7 May 1975 (age 51)
Lviv Oblast	No. 115	Natalya Pipa	Holos	2019	12 October 1983 (age 42)
Lviv Oblast	No. 116	Mykola Kniazhytskyi	European Solidarity	2012	2 June 1968 (age 58)
Lviv Oblast	No. 117	Yaroslav Rushchyshyn	Holos	2019	29 October 1967 (age 58)
Lviv Oblast	No. 118	Halyna Vasylchenko	Holos	2019	28 October 1983 (age 42)
Lviv Oblast	No. 119	Mykhailo Bondar	European Solidarity	2014	17 November 1973 (age 52)
Lviv Oblast	No. 120	Yaroslav Dubnevich	For the Future	2012	7 August 1969 (age 56)
Lviv Oblast	No. 121	Orest Salamakha	Servant of the People	2019	25 June 1991 (age 35)
Lviv Oblast	No. 122	Pavlo Bakunets	Dovira (Note: Elected as a member of Samopomich.)	2019	10 July 1987 (age 39)
Lviv Oblast	No. 123	Taras Batenko	For the Future	2014	20 June 1974 (age 52)
Lviv Oblast	No. 124	Yuriy Kamelchuk	Servant of the People	2019	12 February 1980 (age 46)
Lviv Oblast	No. 125	Andriy Lopushanskyi	European Solidarity	2019	4 December 1962 (age 63)
Lviv Oblast	No. 126	Andriy Kit	Dovira	2014	2 November 1971 (age 54)
Mykolaiv Oblast	No. 127	Oleksandr Pasichnyi	Servant of the People	2019	3 November 1972 (age 53)
Mykolaiv Oblast	No. 128	Oleksandr Haidu	Servant of the People	2019	28 January 1976 (age 50)
Mykolaiv Oblast	No. 129	Ihor Kopytin	Servant of the People	2019	12 February 1981 (age 45)
Mykolaiv Oblast	No. 130	Ihor Nehulevskyi	Servant of the People	2019	6 December 1983 (age 42)
Mykolaiv Oblast	No. 131	Artem Chornomorov	Servant of the People	2019	10 March 1988 (age 38)
Mykolaiv Oblast	No. 132	Maksym Dyrdin	Servant of the People	2019	11 October 1982 (age 43)
Odesa Oblast	No. 133	Artem Dmytruk	Restoration of Ukraine	2019	28 June 1993 (age 33)
Odesa Oblast	No. 134	Oleh Koliev	Servant of the People	2019	9 May 1973 (age 53)
Odesa Oblast	No. 135	Oleksiy Leonov	Servant of the People	2019	26 February 1983 (age 43)
Odesa Oblast	No. 136	Oleksandr Horeniuk	Servant of the People	2019	8 August 1991 (age 34)
Odesa Oblast	No. 137	Oleksiy Honcharenko	European Solidarity	2019	16 September 1980 (age 45)
Odesa Oblast	No. 138	Stepan Cherniavskyi	Servant of the People	2019	4 May 1973 (age 53)
Odesa Oblast	No. 139	Vacant			
Odesa Oblast	No. 140	Serhiy Koleboshyn	Servant of the People	2019	22 November 1977 (age 48)
Odesa Oblast	No. 141	Oleksandr Tkachenko	Servant of the People	2019	15 June 1984 (age 42)
Odesa Oblast	No. 142	Anton Kisse	For the Future	2012	10 October 1958 (age 67)
Odesa Oblast	No. 143	Anatoliy Urbanskyi	For the Future	2019	21 June 1975 (age 51)
Poltava Oblast	No. 144	Dmytro Nalotov	Servant of the People	2019	28 April 1985 (age 41)
Poltava Oblast	No. 145	Andriy Bobliakh	Servant of the People	2019	5 March 1985 (age 41)
Poltava Oblast	No. 146	Yurii Shapovalov	For the Future	2012	14 March 1972 (age 54)
Poltava Oblast	No. 147	Oleh Kulinich	Dovira	2012	25 November 1966 (age 59)
Poltava Oblast	No. 148	Anastasiia Liashenko	Servant of the People	2019	7 November 1986 (age 39)
Poltava Oblast	No. 149	Kostiantyn Kasai	Servant of the People	2019	27 September 1979 (age 46)
Poltava Oblast	No. 150	Oleksiy Movchan	Servant of the People	2019	2 December 1994 (age 31)
Poltava Oblast	No. 151	Maksym Berezin	Servant of the People	2019	9 May 1984 (age 42)
Rivne Oblast	No. 152	Oleksandr Kovalchuk	Servant of the People	2019	5 February 1974 (age 52)
Rivne Oblast	No. 153	Roman Ivanisov	Independent	2019	2 November 1978 (age 47)
Rivne Oblast	No. 154	Oleksandr Aliksiychuk	Servant of the People	2019	6 March 1981 (age 45)
Rivne Oblast	No. 155	Viktor Mialyk	For the Future	2019	10 May 1979 (age 47)
Rivne Oblast	No. 156	Serhii Lytvynenko	Servant of the People	2019	15 February 1968 (age 58)
Sumy Oblast	No. 157	Tetiana Skrypka	Servant of the People	2019	31 December 1984 (age 41)
Sumy Oblast	No. 158	Ihor Vasyliev	Servant of the People	2019	25 August 1984 (age 41)
Sumy Oblast	No. 159		Vacant		
Sumy Oblast	No. 160	Ihor Molotok	For the Future	2012	4 September 1967 (age 58)
Sumy Oblast	No. 161	Maksym Huzenko	Servant of the People	2019	8 September 1981 (age 44)
Sumy Oblast	No. 162	Mykola Zadorozhnii	Servant of the People	2019	5 December 1984 (age 41)
Ternopil Oblast	No. 163	Andriy Bohdanets	Servant of the People	2019	13 July 1983 (age 43)
Ternopil Oblast	No. 164	Ihor Vasyliv	Servant of the People	2019	16 November 1979 (age 46)
Ternopil Oblast	No. 165	Ivan Chaikivskyi	For the Future	2019	29 May 1972 (age 54)
Ternopil Oblast	No. 166	Mykola Liushniak	Dovira	2014	8 February 1974 (age 52)
Ternopil Oblast	No. 167	Volodymyr Hevko	Servant of the People	2019	20 August 1975 (age 50)
Kharkiv Oblast	No. 168	Maria Mezentseva	Servant of the People	2019	10 December 1989 (age 36)
Kharkiv Oblast	No. 169	Oleksandr Kunytskyi	Servant of the People	2019	25 August 1983 (age 42)
Kharkiv Oblast	No. 170	Andriy Odarchenko	Servant of the People	2019	2 November 1978 (age 47)
Kharkiv Oblast	No. 171	Viktoria Kinzburska	Servant of the People	2019	23 October 1980 (age 45)
Kharkiv Oblast	No. 172	Yuriy Zdebskyi	Servant of the People	2019	24 December 1972 (age 53)
Kharkiv Oblast	No. 173	Oleksandr Bakumov	Servant of the People	2019	25 April 1989 (age 37)
Kharkiv Oblast	No. 174	Oleksandr Feldman	Restoration of Ukraine	2012	6 January 1960 (age 66)
Kharkiv Oblast	No. 175	Yevhen Pyvovarov	Servant of the People	2019	4 November 1978 (age 47)
Kharkiv Oblast	No. 176	Vacant			
Kharkiv Oblast	No. 177	Dmytro Liubota	Servant of the People	2019	9 January 1981 (age 45)
Kharkiv Oblast	No. 178	Oleksandr Litvinov	Servant of the People	2019	21 January 1972 (age 54)
Kharkiv Oblast	No. 179	Yuliya Svitlychna	Independent	2020	6 June 1984 (age 42)
Kharkiv Oblast	No. 180	Oleksiy Krasov	Servant of the People	2019	13 November 1987 (age 38)
Kharkiv Oblast	No. 181	Dmytro Mykysha	Servant of the People	2019	4 March 1985 (age 41)
Kherson Oblast	No. 182	Pavlo Pavlish	Servant of the People	2019	10 December 1979 (age 46)
Kherson Oblast	No. 183	Viktoria Vahnier	Servant of the People	2019	21 May 1981 (age 45)
Kherson Oblast	No. 184	Serhiy Kozyr	Servant of the People	2021	10 June 1984 (age 42)
Kherson Oblast	No. 185	Volodymyr Ivanov	Servant of the People	2019	14 July 1982 (age 44)
Kherson Oblast	No. 186	Vacant			
Khmelnytskyi Oblast	No. 187	Mykola Stefanchuk	Servant of the People	2019	4 May 1981 (age 45)
Khmelnytskyi Oblast	No. 188	Serhiy Labaziuk	For the Future	2012	4 June 1980 (age 46)
Khmelnytskyi Oblast	No. 189	Olena Kopanchuk	Servant of the People	2019	1 November 1978 (age 47)
Khmelnytskyi Oblast	No. 190	Oleksii Zhmerenetskyi	Servant of the People	2019	28 October 1986 (age 39)
Khmelnytskyi Oblast	No. 191	Viktor Bondar	For the Future	2019	5 November 1985 (age 40)
Khmelnytskyi Oblast	No. 192	Oleksandr Hereha	For the Future	2012	27 June 1967 (age 59)
Khmelnytskyi Oblast	No. 193	Ihor Marchuk	Servant of the People	2019	17 February 1969 (age 57)
Cherkasy Oblast	No. 194	Liubov Shpak	Servant of the People	2019	19 July 1980 (age 45)
Cherkasy Oblast	No. 195	Oleh Arseniuk	Servant of the People	2019	21 August 1986 (age 39)
Cherkasy Oblast	No. 196	Andriy Strikharskyi	Servant of the People	2019	4 August 1981 (age 44)
Cherkasy Oblast	No. 197	Vitaliy Voitsekhirskyi	Servant of the People	2021	4 July 1981 (age 45)
Cherkasy Oblast	No. 198	Serhii Rudyk	For the Future	2014	11 October 1970 (age 55)
Cherkasy Oblast	No. 199	Serhiy Nahorniak	Servant of the People	2019	13 May 1982 (age 44)
Cherkasy Oblast	No. 200	Anton Yatsenko	Independent	2012	13 July 1977 (age 49)
Chernivtsi Oblast	No. 201	Olena Lys	Servant of the People	2019	15 June 1971 (age 55)
Chernivtsi Oblast	No. 202	Maksym Zaremskyi	Servant of the People	2019	26 June 1991 (age 35)
Chernivtsi Oblast	No. 203	Heorhiy Mazurashu	Servant of the People	2019	17 April 1971 (age 55)
Chernivtsi Oblast	No. 204	Valeriy Bozhyk	Servant of the People	2019	27 June 1971 (age 55)
Chernihiv Oblast	No. 205	Oleh Seminskyi	Servant of the People	2019	20 December 1973 (age 52)
Chernihiv Oblast	No. 206	Vacant			
Chernihiv Oblast	No. 207	Maksym Zuiev	Servant of the People	2019	14 April 1984 (age 42)
Chernihiv Oblast	No. 208	Anatoliy Hunko	Servant of the People	2019	12 March 1976 (age 50)
Chernihiv Oblast	No. 209	Valeriy Zub	Servant of the People	2019	4 March 1970 (age 56)
Chernihiv Oblast	No. 210	Borys Prykhodko	Dovira	2019	23 January 1974 (age 52)
Kyiv	No. 211	Oleksandr Yurchenko	Restoration of Ukraine	2019	23 July 1988 (age 37)
Kyiv	No. 212	Maksym Perebyinis	Servant of the People	2019	11 December 1974 (age 51)
Kyiv	No. 213	Artem Dubnov	Servant of the People	2019	30 August 1988 (age 37)
Kyiv	No. 214	Serhiy Shvets	Servant of the People	2019	13 June 1976 (age 50)
Kyiv	No. 215	Bohdan Yaremenko	Servant of the People	2019	25 September 1971 (age 54)
Kyiv	No. 216	Lesia Zaburanna	Servant of the People	2019	22 August 1981 (age 44)
Kyiv	No. 217	Maryana Bezuhla	Servant of the People	2019	17 May 1988 (age 38)
Kyiv	No. 218	Dmytro Hurin	Servant of the People	2019	24 March 1982 (age 44)
Kyiv	No. 219	Mykola Tyshchenko	Servant of the People	2019	17 May 1972 (age 54)
Kyiv	No. 220	Hanna Bondar	Servant of the People	2019	23 February 1975 (age 51)
Kyiv	No. 221	Anna Purtova	Servant of the People	2019	15 April 1982 (age 44)
Kyiv	No. 222	Roman Hryshchuk	Servant of the People	2019	27 August 1989 (age 36)
Kyiv	No. 223	Liudmyla Buimister	Independent	2019	5 November 1985 (age 40)
Sevastopol	No. 224	Occupied by Russia since 2014; see Annexation of Crimea by the Russian Federation			
Sevastopol	No. 225	Occupied by Russia since 2014; see Annexation of Crimea by the Russian Federation			

== People's Deputies who left ==
Party	Individual	Party list No.	District No.	Date of leaving	Reason
Servant of the People	Mykhailo Fedorov	6		29.08.2019	Cabinet of Ukraine
Servant of the People	Vladyslav Krykliy	12		29.08.2019	Cabinet of Ukraine
Servant of the People	Oleksiy Orzhel	16		29.08.2019	Cabinet of Ukraine
Servant of the People	Denys Maliuska	21		29.08.2019	Cabinet of Ukraine
Servant of the People	Hanna Novosad	50		29.08.2019	Cabinet of Ukraine
Servant of the People	Anna Kovalenko	35		10.09.2019	Office of the President of Ukraine
European Solidarity	Iryna Lutsenko	15		12.11.2019	Health
Servant of the People	Oleksandr Kubrakov	30		03.12.2019	
Servant of the People	Oleksiy Kucher	179		03.12.2019	Appointed Governor of Kharkiv Oblast
Servant of the People	Iryna Venediktova	3		14.01.2020	Appointed Prosecutor General of Ukraine
Unaffiliated	Valeriy Davydenko		208	23.05.2020	Death
Servant of the People	Oleksandr Tkachenko	9		04.06.2020	Appointed Minister of Culture and Information Policy
Batkivshchyna	Olga Bielkova	17		18.06.2020	
Holos	Sviatoslav Vakarchuk	1		26.06.2020	
Servant of the People	Zinovii Andreyovych		87	17.11.2020	Elected Mayor of Nadvirna
Opposition Bloc	Ruslan Trebushkin		50	16.12.2020	
Unaffiliated	Ihor Kolykhaiev		184	30.03.2021	Resigned to focus on position as Mayor of Kherson
Servant of the People	Oleksandr Skichko		197	30.03.2021	Appointed Governor of Cherkasy Oblast
Servant of the People	Denys Monastyrsky	19		16.07.2021	Cabinet of Ukraine
For the Future	Anton Poliakov	73	206	08.10.2021	Death
Servant of the People	Iryna Vereshchuk	29		04.11.2021	Cabinet of Ukraine
Opposition Platform — For Life	Illia Kyva	34		15.03.2022	Defected to Russia
Servant of the People	Mykola Solskyi			24.03.2022	Cabinet of Ukraine
For the Future	Dmytro Lubinets		60	01.07.2022	Cabinet of Ukraine
Opposition Bloc	Vadym Novynskyi		57	08.07.2022	Removed by VR Vote via Request
Servant of the People	Olha Sovhyria	122		27.07.2022	Appointed to the Constitutional Court of Ukraine
Servant of the People	Andrii Kostin	108		27.07.2022	Appointed Prosecutor General of Ukraine
Unaffiliated	Oleksii Kovalov		186	28.08.2022	Death
Holos	Rustem Umierov	18		07.09.2022	Cabinet of Ukraine
Opposition Bloc	Dmytro Shentsev		176	21.09.2022	Removed by VR Vote via Request
Opposition Platform — For Life	Vadym Rabinovych	2		03.11.2022	Defected to Russia
Servant of the People	Ihor Vasylkovskyi		139	03.11.2022	
Opposition Platform - For Life	Yuliia Liovochkina	21		01.12.2022	Removed by VR Vote via Request
Opposition Platform — For Life	Viktor Medvedchuk	3		13.01.2023	Removed by VR vote
Opposition Platform — For Life	Taras Kozak	10		13.01.2023	Removed by VR vote
Opposition Platform — For Life	Renat Kuzmin	35		13.01.2023	Removed by VR vote
Unaffiliated	Andrii Derkach		159	13.01.2023	Removed by VR vote
Unaffiliated	Andrii Aksionov		50	13.01.2023	Removed by VR vote
Opposition Platform — For Life	Natalia Korolevska	4		24.02.2023	Removed by VR Vote
Opposition Platform — For Life	Oleh Voloshyn	30		24.02.2023	Removed by VR Vote
European Solidarity	Mykhailo Zabrodskyi	4		20.03.2023	Removed by VR Vote by request
Opposition Platform — For Life	Tetiana Plachkova	31		14.07.2023	Removed by VR Vote
Servant of the People	Yuriy Aristov	42		27.07.2023	Removed by VR vote
Servant of the People	Andrii Kholodov	22		08.08.2023	Removed by VR Vote
Batkivshchyna	Alyona Shkrum	22		03.12.2024	Removed by VR Vote
Servant of the People	Iryna Allakhverdiyeva	116		25.02.2025	Removed by VR Vote
European Solidarity	Andriy Parubiy	2		31.08.2025	Death
