= Sushko =

Sushko (Ukrainian: Сушко) is a Ukrainian surname. It is also the name of a noble Cossack family originating from the Cossack Hetmanate in the 17th–18th centuries. The Sushko family played a prominent role in the military and administrative structure of the Cossack state, holding various positions in the Myrhorod Regiment.

Members of the family belonged to the Cossack officer class (starshyna) and later became part of the hereditary nobility of the Russian Empire. The family is first mentioned in historical records from the mid-17th century.

Other family members held positions such as sotnyk (company commander), bunchuk comrades, and sign-bearer comrades, which were integral to the military structure of the Cossack elite.

The Sushko family is documented in various genealogical sources and is considered one of the important families of the Left-Bank Ukraine during the Cossack period.

== Notable people ==
- Hennadiy Sushko (born 1970), Ukrainian football coach and former player
- Iryna Sushko (born 1967), Ukrainian mathematician
- Maxim Sushko (born 1999), Belarusian ice hockey forward
- Orest Sushko, re-recording film mixer
- Pavlo Sushko (born 1979). Ukrainian politician
- Vadim Sushko (born 1986), Belarusian ice hockey defenceman
- Yuriy Sushko (born 1979), Ukrainian serial killer
