= Serhiy Shvets =

Serhiy Shvets may refer to:

- Serhiy Shvets (footballer)
- Serhiy Shvets (politician)
