= Pavlo Frolov =

Ukrainian politician

- Павло Валерійович Фролов
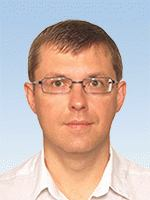
- Official portrait, 2019

People's Deputy of Ukraine
- Incumbent
- Assumed office 29 August 2019
- Constituency: Servant of the People, No. 126

Personal details
- Born: 1 September 1976 (age 50) Kryvyi Rih, Dnipropetrovska oblast, Ukrainian SSR, Soviet Union (now Ukraine)
- Party: Servant of the People
- Education: Kyiv National Economic University; Academy of Advocacy of Ukraine

Pavlo Valeriyovych Frolov (Ukrainian: Павло Валерійович Фролов; born 1 September 1976, Kryvyi Rih, Dnipropetrovska oblast) is a Ukrainian politician. Member of the Ukrainian Parliament of the 9th convocation from the Servant of the People party.

== Biography ==
Graduated from the Kyiv National Economic University (specialty "Finance and Credit") and Law Faculty of the Academy of Advocacy of Ukraine.

He worked as the Head of the Independent Unit for Interaction with the Verkhovna Rada of Ukraine and Coordination of Legislative Work of the State Committee of Natural Resources of Ukraine, Assistant Consultant to the People's Deputy of Ukraine (Secretariat of the Verkhovna Rada of Ukraine), Deputy Head of the Secretariat of the Deputy Faction, Chief Consultant to the Secretariat of the Special Control Commission on Privatization.

He was elected in the 2019 Ukrainian parliamentary elections as People's Deputy of the 9th convocation from the Servant of the People party (No. 126 on the list of candidates). At the time of the election, he was Chief Consultant of the Verkhovna Rada of Ukraine Secretariat.

He is member of the Verkhovna Rada Committee on Rules of Procedure, Parliamentary Ethics, and Work Administration, Chairman of the Subcommittee on Rules of Procedure of the Verkhovna Rada, member of the Permanent Delegation to the Parliamentary Assembly of the Organization for Security and Co-operation in Europe, member of the groups on interparliamentary relations with China, India, Italy.

== See also ==
- List of members of the parliament of Ukraine, 2019–
