= Anton Shvachko =

Ukrainian politician

- Антон Швачко
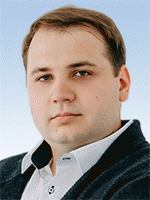
- Official portrait, 2021

People's Deputy of Ukraine
- Incumbent
- Assumed office 7 September 2021
- Constituency: Servant of the People, No. 139

Personal details
- Born: 11 December 1992 (age 33) Sumy, Ukraine
- Party: Servant of the People
- Other political affiliations: Independent
- Education: Sumy National Agrarian University

Anton Oleksiyovych Shvachko (Ukrainian: Антон Олексійович Швачко; born 11 December 1992) is a Ukrainian politician currently serving as a People's Deputy of Ukraine from Servant of the People, serving as a People's Deputy from the party's list. He is also head of the regional secretariat of the Servant of the People party in Ukraine's northern Sumy Oblast.

== Early life and career ==
Anton Oleksiyovych Shvachko was born in 1992 in the city of Sumy, in northern Ukraine. After graduating from secondary school, he studied at Sumy National Agrarian University's faculty of food technology, graduating with a bachelor's degree. In 2017 he received a master's degree in "restaurant technological engineer" at the university's faculty of economics and management.

== Political career ==
Shvachko was an unsuccessful candidate for People's Deputy of Ukraine in the 2019 Ukrainian parliamentary election, as 139th on the party list. At the time of submitting documents as a candidate to the Central Election Commission in July 2019, he was an independent and unemployed, living in Sumy. In the summer of 2019, he participated in the training of People's Deputies in Truskavets.

Shvachko became a deputy after Denys Monastyrsky, who was a People's Deputy from Servant of the People, was appointed Minister of the Interior on 16 July 2021. On 7 September 2021, Shvachko was sworn in as a People's Deputy.
