= Dmytro Nalotov =

Ukrainian politician

- Дмитро Нальотов
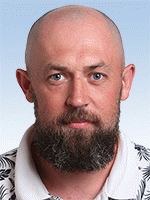
- Dmytro Oleksandrovych Nalotov

People's Deputy of Ukraine
- Incumbent
- Assumed office 29 August 2019
- Preceded by: Serhiy Kaplin
- Constituency: Poltava Oblast, No. 144

Personal details
- Born: 28 April 1985 (age 41) Poltava, Ukrainian SSR, Soviet Union (now Ukraine)
- Party: Servant of the People
- Other political affiliations: Independent
- Education: Poltava National Pedagogical University

Dmytro Oleksandrovych Nalotov (Ukrainian: Дмитро Олександрович Нальотов; born 28 April 1985) is a Ukrainian politician currently serving as a People's Deputy of Ukraine representing Ukraine's 144th electoral district from Servant of the People since 2019.

== Early life and career ==
Dmytro Oleksandrovych Nalotov was born on 28 April 1985 in the city of Poltava, in central Ukraine. He is a graduate of the Poltava National Pedagogical University, specialising in practical psychology and social education.

Nalotov has founded several non-governmental organisations and companies, and from 2004 to 2009 was also a snowboarding instructor at the Dragobrat ski resort. From 2006 to 2011, he was head of the Urban BoardShop company in Poltava, and from 2010 to 2015, he was owner of SnowLab Gudauri, a Georgia-based company. Prior to his election, Nalotov was active in the theme parks industry both in Georgia and in Kyiv, Ukraine's capital.

== Political career ==
During the 2019 Ukrainian parliamentary election, Nalotov ran as the candidate of Servant of the People for People's Deputy of Ukraine in Ukraine's 144th electoral district. At the time of the election, he was an independent. Nalotov was successfully elected, winning with 41.97% of the vote and defeating Poltava mayor Oleksandr Mamay and incumbent People's Deputy Serhiy Kaplin (both independent).

In the Verkhovna Rada (national parliament of Ukraine), Nalotov joined the Servant of the People faction, as well as the Verkhovna Rada Committee on Humanitarian and Informational Policy. According to an analysis by anti-corruption non-governmental organisation Chesno, Nalotov, alongside fellow Servant of the People deputy Anatoliy Bobliakh, voted the most in favour of government proposals in 2019. At the same time, he abstained from 34% of votes.
