= Valentyna Korolenko =

Ukrainian politician lawyer, financier and political activist

- Валентина Короленко

Member of the Verkhovna Rada
- Incumbent
- Assumed office 30 August 2022

Personal details
- Born: Valentyna Yuriyivna Korolenko; 15 May 1984 (age 42) Kryvyi Rih, Ukraine, Soviet Union
- Party: Servant of the People

Valentyna Yuriyivna Korolenko (Ukrainian: Валентина Юріївна Короленко; born on 15 May 1980), is a Ukrainian politician lawyer, financier and political activist, who is a member of parliament, a people's deputy of Ukraine of the Verkhovna Rada the 9th convocation, and a member of the "Servant of the People" faction.

== Biography ==
Valentyna Korolenko was born in Kryvyi Rih on 15 May 1984.

She graduated from the Kryvyi Rih Technical University, where she obtained a master's degree in ecology. Subsequently, she studied at the Center for Customs Affairs and Postgraduate Education of the Academy of the Customs Service of Ukraine, majoring in "law" and at the Dnipropetrovsk National University named after Olesya Honchara, specialty — "finances and credit". She worked in various positions at the Kryvorizka and Dnipropetrovsk customs offices. She has total civil service experience for 14 years.

In 2019, Korolenko was a candidate for deputy of the Verkhovna Rada ofon the election list of the "Servant of the People" party, No. 145; individual entrepreneur, and was an independent at that time.

On 19 August 2022, she was recognized as an elected People's Deputy of Ukraine from the Servant of the People party instead of fellow party member Artem Mykhaylyuk, who renounced the powers of a deputy.

On 30 August, she took the oath as a member of the Verkhovna Rada.
