= Halyna Mykhailiuk =

Ukrainian lawyer and politician (born 1987)

- Галина Михайлюк
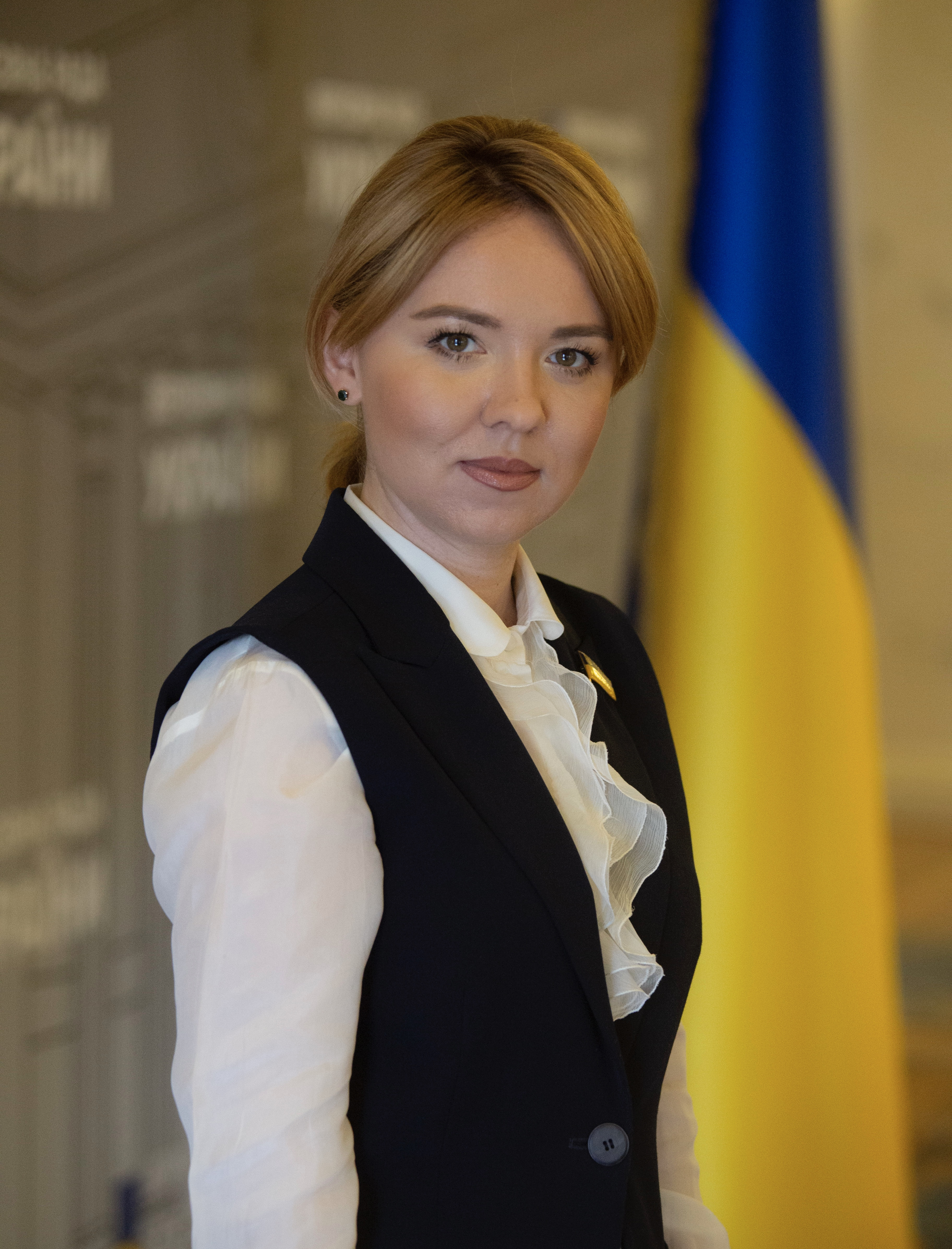

People's Deputy of Ukraine
- Incumbent
- Assumed office 29 August 2019
- Constituency: Servant of the People, No. 47

Personal details
- Born: 14 June 1987 (age 39) Kyiv, Ukrainian SSR, Soviet Union (now Ukraine)
- Party: Servant of the People
- Education: Odesa Law Academy (2009), Odesa State Economic University (2010), University of York (2012)

Halyna Mykhailiuk (Ukrainian: Галина Олегівна Михайлюк; born 14 June 1987) is a Ukrainian lawyer and politician currently serving as a People's Deputy of Ukraine as the 46th member of the party list of Servant of the People. As Member of Parliament, she holds a position of the Deputy Head of the Committee on Law Enforcement and Co-Head of the Verkhovna Rada of Ukraine Groups on Interparliamentary Relations with Japan, Australia, New Zealand and Norway.

On 20 December 2023, Halyna Mykhailiuk was appointed as the Representative of the President of Ukraine in the Verkhovna Rada of Ukraine.

Previously, she served as a legislation drafting expert for European Union Advisory Mission Ukraine (EUAM Ukraine).

== Early life and career ==
From 2004 to 2009, Halyna Mykhailiuk studied at the Odesa Law Academy National University, graduating with a master's degree in law. She also graduated from the Odesa State Economic University in 2010 with a master's degree in economics and from the University of York in 2012 with a master's degree in international corporate and commercial law. In March 2019, the Ministry of Education of Ukraine approved the assignment of an associate professor degree to Halyna Mykhailiuk. In August 2023, Halyna Mykhailiuk received an academic rank of professor.

Halyna Mykhailiuk previously served as a legislation drafting expert for European Union Advisory Mission Ukraine, managing the development and implementation of the EUAM projects "Enhancing the Legislative Drafting Capacities in the Area of Security Sector Reform of the Verkhovna Rada of Ukraine through EU Best Practices" and "Increasing the Role of the Verkhovna Rada of Ukraine in Promoting Better Regulation through Ex-post Impact Evaluation of Legislation".

=== Teaching and Academic Roles ===
- Associate Professor at the National University of Kyiv-Mohyla Academy (since 2012, part-time).
- Associate Professor at the Ukrainian Free University in Munich, Germany (since 2013).
- Visiting Lecturer at the University of Arkansas, United States (2016).

== Political career ==
Following the 2019 Ukrainian parliamentary election, Halyna Mykhailiuk was elected as a People's Deputy of Ukraine as a member of the party list of the Servant of the People party. She serves as Deputy Head of the Verkhovna Rada Committee on Law Enforcement, Member of the Standing Delegation of the Verkhovna Rada of Ukraine in the NATO Parliamentary Assembly, Co-Head of the Groups for Interparliamentary Relations with Japan, Australia, New Zealand, and Norway, Deputy Head of Groups for Interparliamentary Relations with the United States of America, the United Kingdom of Great Britain and Northern Ireland, and Canada., Member of parliamentary friendship groups with the United States, Canada, the United Kingdom, Norway, Qatar, Singapore, and Australia.

On 20 December 2023, the President of Ukraine issued the Decree №823/2023 appointing Halyna Mykhailiuk as his Representative in the Verkhovna Rada of Ukraine.

In February 2024, Halyna Mykhailiuk was elected Co-Chair of the Network of Women Legislators in Defence, Security, and Peace Portfolios (WLID), supported by the Parliamentary Centre of Canada, where she leads interparliamentary cooperation of countries in the Global North.

Since January 2025, Halyna Mykhailiuk is a Member of the Parliamentarians for Global Action (PGA) Executive Committee.

== Academic publications ==
The academic work focuses on intellectual property law, commercial designations, judicial reform, and legal regulation of the digital economy. Mykhailiuk has written over 90 academic publications. Her main publications are:

- The EU Law on Commercial Designations. K., 2016; 2017;
- The Legal Analysis of Using Trade Marks as Keywords in Advertising through the Internet // Wissenschaftliches Sammelwerk der Ukrainischen Freien Universität. 2016. Bd. 21;
- Judicial Practice of the EU in IT: Some Categories of Cases // IT Law: Theory and Practice. O., 2017;
- Implementation of Constitutional Reform on Judiciary in Ukraine on its way towards European Integration // Journal of Contemporary European Research (Scopus). 2018. Vol. 14.
- Judicial Control over Arbitration in Ukraine. (Chapter 22), in Larry diMatteo, Marta Infantino, Nathalie Potin (eds.), The Cambridge Handbook of Judicial Control over Judicial Awards, Cambridge, CUP, 2021.P. 350 – 371.
- Larry Di Matteo, Galyna Mykhailiuk. Advancing the Rule of Law: Creating and Independent and Competent Judiciary. The Italian Law Journal (Scopus). Vol. 07 – No. 01, 2021. P. 61 – 95. (Scopus).
- Halyna Mykhailiuk, Larry DiMatteo. Creating a Comprehensive Peaceful Assembly Law for Ukraine: Idea and Ideal. New Perspectives: Interdisciplinary Journal of Central & East European Politics and International Relations (Scopus). Issue 29(1), 2021. P. 45 – 68.
- Mykhailiuk G., Rustamzade A., Bakhishov A. Digitalization of Financial Services and Challenges of Adaptation of Control. Financial and Credit Activities: Problems of Theory and Practice (Web of Science). №3(38), 2021. P. 46 – 55.

=== Academic Service ===
- Member of the Specialized Academic Council on defence of PhD theses in intellectual property law.
- Member of the editorial board of the journal Theory and Practice of Intellectual Property.
- In December, 2025, received an award from Kobe Gakuin University (Japan) for contributions to international academic cooperation and exchange.
