= Serhii Bunin =

Ukrainian politician

- Сергій Бунін
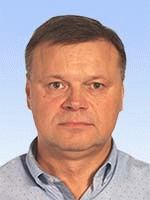
- Official portrait, 2019

People's Deputy of Ukraine
- Incumbent
- Assumed office 29 August 2019
- Preceded by: Serhii Mishchenko
- Constituency: Kyiv Oblast, No. 98

Personal details
- Born: 3 May 1971 (age 55) Kyiv, Ukrainian SSR, Soviet Union (now Ukraine)
- Party: Servant of the People
- Other political affiliations: Independent; Self Reliance; Bloc Borys Olijnyk and Myhailo Syrota
- Education: National Transport University; Taras Shevchenko National University of Kyiv

Serhii Valeriiovych Bunin (Ukrainian: Сергій Валерійович Бунін; born 3 May 1971) is a Ukrainian landowner and politician currently serving as a People's Deputy of Ukraine from Ukraine's 98th electoral district in Kyiv Oblast. He is a member of the Servant of the People party.

== Early life and career ==
Serhii Valeriiovych Bunin was born on 3 May 1971, in the Ukrainian capital of Kyiv. He is a graduate of the National Transport University, specialising in mechanical engineering, and from the Taras Shevchenko National University of Kyiv with a specialisation in jurisprudence.

From 1991 to 2002 Bunin worked at Ukrprombudservis NVO, eventually rising to the position of general director of the company. He also became director of the Hrant TOV company in 2001.

== Political career ==
Bunin first ran for office unsuccessfully as a member of the Kyiv City Council in the 2006 Ukrainian local elections, as a member of the Bloc Borys Olijnyk and Myhailo Syrota. Nine years later, he ran a member of the Self Reliance party for the Kyiv Oblast Council in the 2015 Ukrainian local elections, winning in the oblast's 35th district.

During the first round of the 2019 Ukrainian presidential election, Bunin headed the electoral campaign of Self Reliance presidential candidate Andriy Sadovyi in Ukraine's 95th electoral district. Four months later, in the 2019 Ukrainian parliamentary election, he ran as the candidate for Servant of the People in Ukraine's 98th electoral district. At the time of the election, he was an independent. He was successfully elected, winning 42.27% of the vote. The next-closest candidate was independent incumbent Serhii Mishchenko, who won 21.05% of the vote.

Within the Verkhovna Rada (Ukrainian parliament), Bunin is a member of the Servant of the People faction, and is a member of the Verkhovna Rada Agricultural and Land Committee. According to anti-corruption non-governmental organisation Chesno, Bunin owns the most land plots of any People's Deputy, owning nine out of ten land plots in the village of Bilohorodka, Kyiv Oblast.

Chesno also criticised Bunin for voting for Draft Law 5655, which it alleges would give real estate companies wide-reaching rights regarding the reconstruction of Ukraine after the Russian invasion, at the expense of other individuals.
