= Oleh Tarasov =

Ukrainian politician (born 1984)

- Олег Тарасов
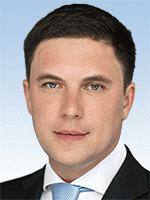

People's Deputy of Ukraine
- Incumbent
- Assumed office 29 August 2019
- Constituency: Servant of the People, No. 74

Personal details
- Born: 26 February 1984 (age 42) Kropyvnytskyi, Ukraine
- Party: Servant of the People

Oleh Serhiiovych Tarasov (Ukrainian: Олег Сергійович Тарасов; born 26 February 1984) is a Ukrainian entrepreneur and politician. He is a People's Deputy of Ukraine of the 9th convocation.

== Biography ==
Tarasov was born in Kropyvnytskyi, Ukraine. He graduated from Taras Shevchenko National University of Kyiv on the specialty of international business. From 2003, Tarasov worked as a foreign trade manager in the area of the export of agricultural products for ‘Soufflet Group’. In 2006, he worked as a manager of the private enterprise “Ahroekstra”. From June 2015 to August 2019 worked as a deputy director for foreign trade activities of “Ahroekstra”. In 2010, he took part in people’s primaries of the party “Strong Ukraine” to the Kropyvnytskyi city council. Back then, he served as a deputy director of LLC “AHROSPETSSERVIS”. From 2012, Tarasov is a deputy head of the public organization ‘Ukrainian Agrarian Council’.

== Political career ==
In 2019 parliamentary elections was a candidate for people’s deputies from the political party ‘Servant of the People’, № 74 on the list. During the elections: a deputy director for foreign trade activities of “Ahroekstra”, non-party. Lives in Kropyvnytskyi.

On 29 August 2019 Tarasov took the oath of a People’s Deputy of Ukraine, a member of the parliament.

Faction: member of the "Servant of the People" political party parliamentary faction.

Post: Chairperson of the Sub-committee on Improving the Structure of Public Administration in the Area of Agro-Industrial Complex of the Verkhovna Rada of Ukraine Committee on Agrarian and Land Policy.
