= Sumy National Agrarian University =

Public university in Sumy, Ukraine

Coordinates: 50°53′00″N 34°46′41″E

- Сумський національний аграрний університет
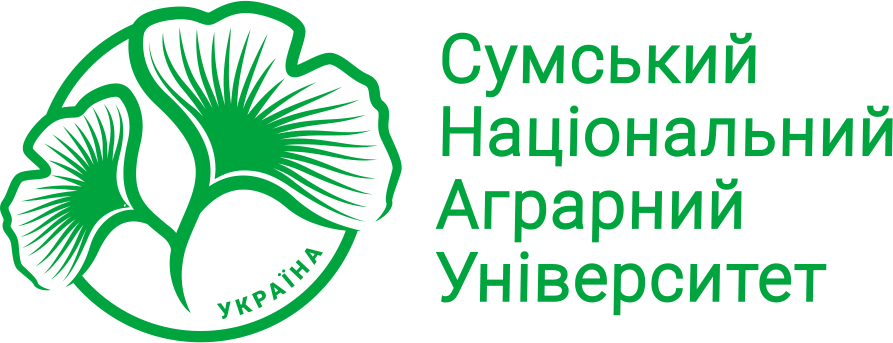
- Motto in English: The university that studies life
- Type: Public university
- Established: 1977 as a branch of the Dokuchaev Kharkiv Agricultural Institute; 1990 as a branch of the Kharkiv Agricultural Institute; 1997 as Sumy National Agrarian University
- Affiliations: Ministry of Education and Science of Ukraine
- Rector: Ladyka Volodymyr Ivanovich
- Location: Sumy, Ukraine
- Campus: Urban
- Website: snau.edu.ua/en/
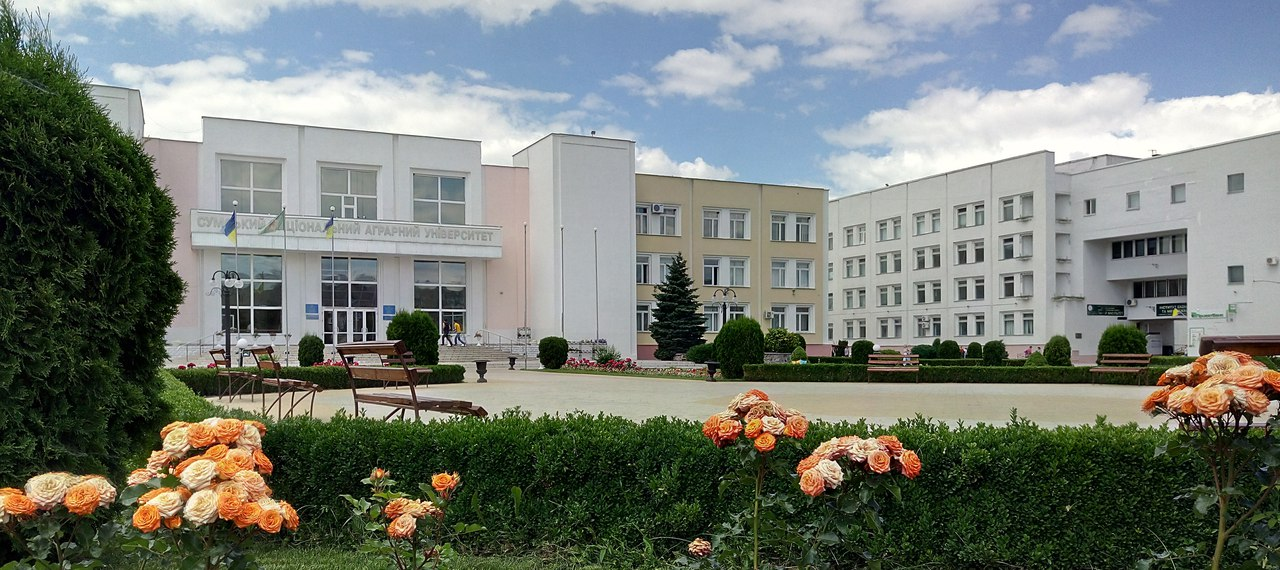

The Sumy National Agrarian University (abbr. SNAU) is a higher educational institution in Sumy, Ukraine.

== History ==
Sumy National Agrarian University was opened in April 1977 as a branch of Kharkiv Agricultural Institute named after Dokuchaev (Order of the Ministry of Agriculture of the USSR from 29.04.1977 No 95).

In 1990, on the basis of the branch created Sumy Agricultural Institute (Order of the State Committee of the Council of Ministers of the USSR for food and procurement from 27.02.1990 No 24) In 1997, the Institute received university status. Presidential Decree of 7 August 2001, No. 591 university granted the status of national (Order of the Ministry of Agrarian Policy of Ukraine 22.08.2001 No. 253).

According to the decision of the State Accreditation Commission of the Ministry of Education and Science of Ukraine 27.11.2007, protocol (minutes) No 68, Sumy National Agrarian University is recognized as an accredited university by status of institutions of higher education IV (fourth) level for the period prior to 1 July 2017 (Certificate of RD-IV No. 193846).

== Campuses and buildings ==
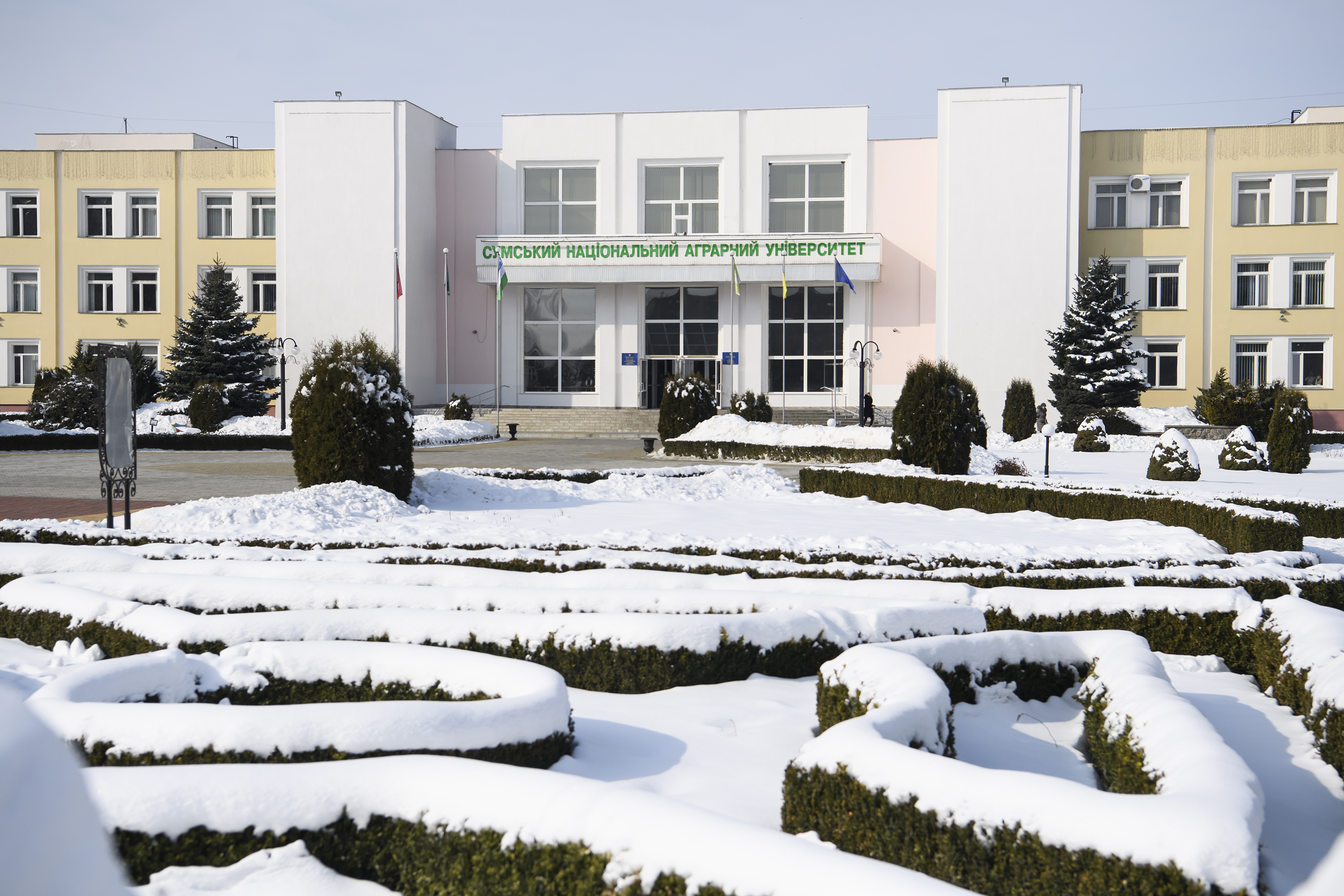
Main campus

Material and technical basis of the university consists of 9 educational laboratory rooms with the total area of 105244 sq. m.; workrooms for laboratory practical classes of students of engineering specialty; training grounds; engineering facilities buildings; research departments; a modern assembly hall with 450 seats. Pursuant to the order of the Ministry of Agrarian Policy of Ukraine No. 180 of 19 June 2003 “On Creation of University Centre at Sumy National Agrarian University…” 6 institutes of higher education of the 1-2 levels of accreditation were added to the university. After the rearrangement according to the specialization, the total area of Sumy National Agrarian University makes up 364780 sq. m., including academic area – 243185, area of educational support buildings (workrooms, training grounds, engineering facilities buildings, research departments) – 121595 sq. m.

== Institutes and faculties ==
- Economics and Management Department;
- Law Department;
- Biotechnological Department;
- Veterinary medicine Department;
- Engineering-technological Department;
- Building Department;
- Food technologies Department;
- Agronomical Department;
- Post-graduate Education Department;
- Correspondence Education Department;
- Pre-educational Department, Department of marketing.

== Students self-government ==
- SNAU students’ self-government is also a member of the UASS – Ukrainian Association of Student Self-government
- The students’ self-government representatives in SNAU (students’ rector and student deans) meet every week with the rector of the university to discuss their requests and worries.
- In 2015 the students’ self-government of SNAU dealt mainly with activities such as: volunteering, activities with children (St. Nicolaus day), organizing discussion circles (scientific) and meeting with management and orphanage visits. However, students’ selfgovernment is struggling with lack of academic issues and preferably is aimed to the social student activities.

== See also ==
List of universities in Ukraine
