= Maksym Khlapuk =

Ukrainian politician

- Максим Хлапук

People's Deputy of Ukraine
- Incumbent
- Assumed office 19 October 2022
- Constituency: Holos, No. 22

Personal details
- Born: 20 July 1984 (age 42) Soviet Union
- Party: Holos

Maksym Mykolayovych Khlapuk (Ukrainian: Максим Миколайович Хлапук; born 20 July 1984) is a Ukrainian politician who is currently a People's Deputy of Ukraine of the 9th convocation, elected as a member of the "Holos" party, since 19 October 2022.

== Biography ==
Maksym Khlapuk was born on 20 July 1984. He graduated from the National University of Kyiv-Mohyla Academy with a degree in political science in 2009 later and obtained a master's degree in political science (Master of Politics) from the University of Jena in Germany.

In 2015, he graduated from the Diplomatic Academy of Ukraine under the Ministry of Foreign Affairs of Ukraine and obtained a master's degree in foreign policy.

In 2019, Khlapuk ran for the Verkhovna Rada on the 9th convocation from the "Holos" party No. 22 on the list, but did not pass.

He held the position of deputy head of the secretariat of the Chairman of the Verkhovna Rada.

Expert of USAID's "Rada" program on implementation of transparency in the parliament. Founder and head of the Rivne city youth public organization "Youth Media Center".

For three convocations in a row (6, 7 and 8), he served as the assistant of the deputy of the Verkhovna Rada Andriy Parubiy on a paid basis. Since 2016, he participated in the organization of the office of the Speaker of the Verkhovna Rada of Ukraine.

On 19 October 2022, Khlapuk became a member of the Verkhovna Rada.
