= Yulia Ovchynnykova =

Ukrainian politician (born 1985)

- Юлія Овчинникова
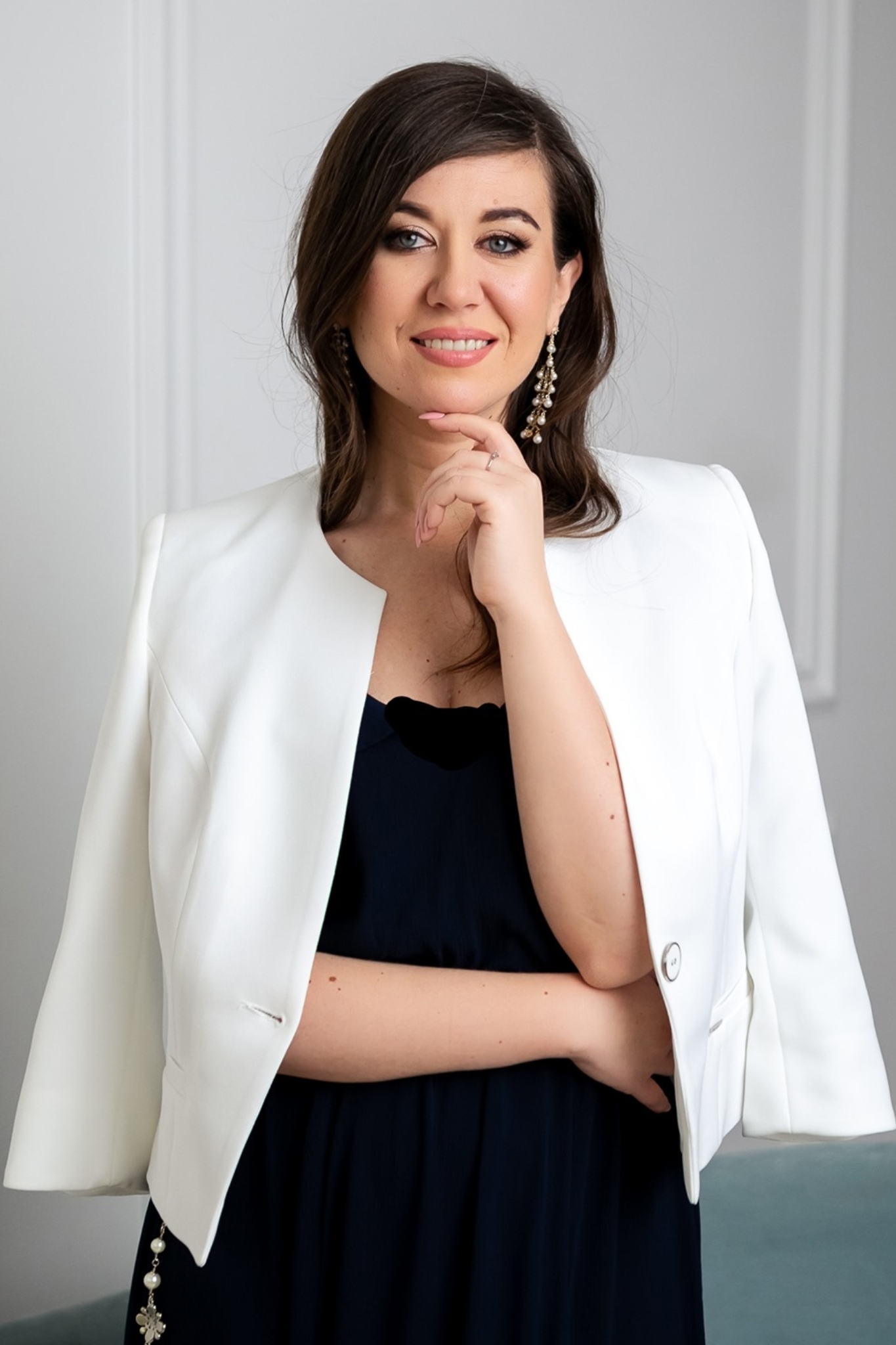
- Ovchynnykova in September 2021

Member of the Verkhovna Rada
- Incumbent
- Assumed office 29 August 2019

Personal details
- Born: Yulia Yuriivna Ovcynnnykova; 24 March 1985 Donetsk, Ukraine, Soviet Union
- Party: Servant of the People

Yulia Yuriivna Ovchynnykova (Ukrainian: Юлія Юріївна Овчинникова; born on 24 March 1985); is a Ukrainian politician who is serving as a People's Deputy of Ukraine from the "Servant of the People" party.

== Early life and education ==
Ovchynnikova graduated from Donetsk National University in 2007 with a degree in biology. She pursued her postgraduate studies in ecology at Donetsk National University from 2007 to 2010. In July 2019, she defended her dissertation at the Institute of Agroecology and Nature Management of the NAAS of Ukraine, earning her candidate of biological sciences degree in ecology.

== Career ==
Professionally, Ovchynnikova began her career as Deputy Head of the Student and Postgraduate Trade Union Organization at Donetsk National University in 2011. From 2011 to 2014, she served as the Head of the Laboratory for Methodological Support of Interdisciplinary Education and Internship at Donetsk National University. From 2014 to 2018, she was an associate professor in the Department of Zoology and Ecology at Donetsk National University named after Vasyl Stus in Vinnytsia. From 2016 to 2019, she served as Acting Dean of the Faculty of Biology at Donetsk National University named after Vasyl Stus.

=== Political career ===
In addition to her professional work, Ovchynnikova has been active in public activities. She was a Presidential Scholar of Ukraine from 2009 to 2010. From 2011 to 2020, she led the Donetsk Regional Youth NGO "Youth Initiative of Cities". She participated in EU youth projects (Youth in Action, Erasmus+) in the UK, Germany, Poland, and Azerbaijan, and was elected Coordinator of the Interdisciplinary Working Group of the European Council of Doctoral Candidates and Junior Researchers in Brussels. Since 2013, she has been managing the "Volunteer Movement of Donetsk". From 2015 to 2017 and in 2019, she was a delegate from Ukraine to the European Council of Doctoral Candidates and Junior Researchers (Eurodoc), and was elected to the Council of Young Scientists under the Ministry of Education and Science of Ukraine.

Since 2019, Ovchynnikova has been a Member of Parliament from the "Servant of the People" party. She is a member of the Verkhovna Rada Committee on Environmental Policy and Nature Management, and she chairs the Subcommittee on Forest Resources, Biodiversity, Natural Landscapes, Protected Areas, and the Adaptation of Ukrainian Legislation to EU Law. She is also the co-chair of the Interparliamentary Relations Group with the Republic of Lithuania, and part of the Ukrainian delegation to the EU-Ukraine Parliamentary Association Committee. Before 2022, she chaired the Subcommittee on Forest Resources, Wildlife, Natural Landscapes, and Protected Areas. Since December 12, 2019, Ovchynnikova has been the co-chair of the "Humane Country" association, created by UAnimals to promote humane values and protect animals from cruelty.

A member of the Ukrainian delegation to the Parliamentary Assembly of the Council of Europe since 2020, Ovchynnikova joined the Alliance of Liberals and Democrats for Europe group and became a member of the Committee on Social Affairs, Health and Sustainable Development, and the Committee on Culture, Science, Education, and Media. Since 2025, she has been the Assembly's rapporteur on the draft Council of Europe Convention on the Protection of the Environment through Criminal Law, the first international legally binding instrument to address environmental crime.

Ovchynnikova is also a member of the International Alliance of Parliamentarians for the Recognition of Ecocide. In December 2022, she was part of the Ukrainian delegation to the 15th meeting of the Conference of the Parties to the Convention on Biological Diversity in Montreal.

== Awards and honors ==
Yuliia Ovchynnikova has received numerous awards and honors for her contributions. She is a laureate of the Cabinet of Ministers of Ukraine Award for Special Achievements of Youth in Developing Ukraine for 2018, recognized for her cultural, artistic, and scientific activities, as well as for the preservation and promotion of historical and cultural heritage. In 2019, she received the Verkhovna Rada of Ukraine Award for Youth Contribution to Parliamentary Development and Self-Government. She was also a Presidential Scholar of Ukraine from 2009 to 2010 and won the "Young Person of the Year" competition in the "Best Youth Leader" category in 2013.
