= Taras Tarasenko =

Ukrainian politician

- Тарас Тарасенко
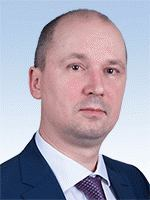

Member of the Verkhovna Rada
- Incumbent
- Assumed office 29 August 2019

Personal details
- Born: Taras Petrovych Tarasenko; 26 July 1980 (age 45) Bohuslav, Kyiv Oblast, Ukrainian SSR, Soviet Union
- Political party: Servant of the People

Taras Petrovych Tarasenko (Ukrainian: Тарас Петрович Тарасенко; born July 26, 1980, in the city of Bohuslav, Kyiv region) is a Ukrainian lawyer and arbitration manager. People's Deputy of Ukraine of the 9th convocation. He is a member of inter-factional union "People" in the Verkhovna Rada of Ukraine.

== Biography ==
Born on July 26, 1980, in Bohuslav. His mother works in the field of secondary education, and his father was a deputy of the Bohuslav City Council.

Taras Tarasenko graduated from the Law Faculty of the Kyiv National Economic University.

== Parliamentary activity ==
Member of the Verkhovna Rada Committee on Human Rights, Deoccupation and Reintegration of the Temporarily Occupied Territories in Donetsk, Luhansk Oblasts and the Autonomous Republic of Crimea, Sevastopol, National Minorities and International Relations, Chairman of the Subcommittee on Human Rights.

Member of the Ukrainian part of the Interparliamentary Assembly of the Verkhovna Rada of Ukraine, the Seimas of the Lithuania and the Seimas and the Senate of Poland.

Co-chair of the group for inter-parliamentary relations with Latvia.

Member of the group for inter-parliamentary relations with South Africa, Italy, Poland, and Canada.

Tarasenkno, along with three other deputies, is the author of a bill on judicial reform - 3711-2, which, according to the media, "actually opposes changes in this branch of government."

On July 22, 2025, he voted in favor of draft law 12414, which restricts the National Anti-Corruption Bureau of Ukraine and the Specialized Anti-Corruption Prosecutor's Office. The law sparked a wave of anti-corruption protests.

== Sources ==
- Tarasenko Taras Petrovich on the website of the Verkhovna Rada of Ukraine
