= Liudmyla Marchenko =

Ukrainian politician (born 1983)

- Людмила Марченко
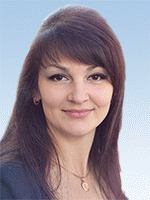
- Born: 28 March 1983
- Occupation: Politician

Liudmyla Ivanivna Marchenko (Ukrainian: Людмила Іванівна Марченко) (born March 28, 1983) is a Ukrainian politician. She is a People's Deputy of Ukraine of the 9th convocation. On July 12, 2023, she was expelled from the "Servant of the People" party.

== Early life and education ==
Liudmyla Marchenko graduated from the West Ukrainian National University with degrees in entrepreneurship, Finance and Taxation, and Economic Cybernetics.

She worked in the training and personnel development departments of hypermarket chains Epicenter K and Nova Linia.

== Political activity ==
In 2019, Marchenko was elected as a People's Deputy from the "Servant of the People" party, No. 63 on the list.

She was a member of the Verkhovna Rada Committee on Rules of Procedure, Deputy Ethics, and Organization of Work, and the head of the subcommittee on legislation concerning the status of the People's Deputy of Ukraine.

She is the co-chair of the inter-parliamentary relations group with Georgia and a member of the relations group with Azerbaijan.

== Controversies ==
On July 5, 2023, NABU reported that Marchenko's assistant received a bribe for facilitating inclusion through regional military administrations in the "Shliakh" system, which allows for permission to leave the country. Detectives conducted a search of Marchenko.

On the same day, former Deputy Minister of Internal Affairs Anton Gerashchenko announced Marchenko's detention in Ternopil while receiving a $3,000 bribe. Later, a video was added showing Marchenko attempting to dispose of the bribe.

On July 12, 2023, according to the assistant to the head of the party Olena Shuliak, Anastasiia Klimchuk, People's Deputy Liudmyla Marchenko was expelled from the "Servant of the People" party. Additionally, the Ternopil regional organization of the "Servant of the People" party prematurely terminated Marchenko's powers.
