= Maryna Bardina =

Ukrainian politician (born 1992)

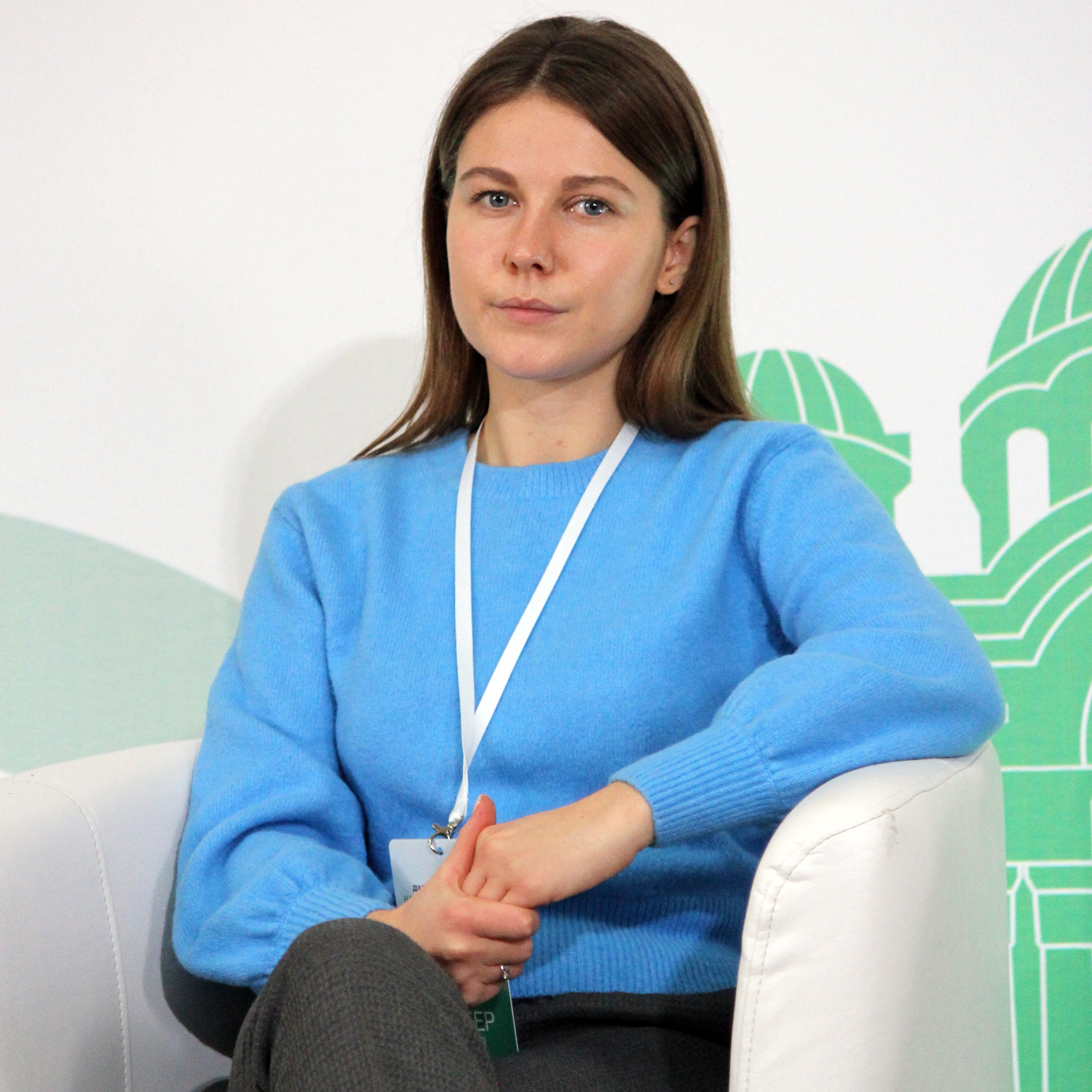
Maryna Bardina

Maryna Olehivna Bardina (born on 17 December 1992) is a People's Deputy of Ukraine of the 9th convocation. Deputy head of the Verkhovna Rada of Ukraine Committee on Foreign Policy and Interparliamentary Cooperation, head of the subcommittee on Ukraine's compliance with international obligations in human rights protection and gender policy. Member of the Permanent Delegation to the Parliamentary Assembly of the Council of Europe.

== Early life and education ==
In 2015, Maryna Bardina studied at The Visegrad Academy for the Political Leadership project. In 2016, she graduated from the Kyiv-Mohyla Academy with a master's degree in sociology. In 2017, Bardina graduated from The James S. Denton Transatlantic Fellowship (Washington, US) and completed an internship at the headquarters of the International Republican Institute. In 2020, she obtained a master's degree in International Law at the Institute of International Relations of Taras Shevchenko National University of Kyiv.

== Career ==
=== Professional activity ===
In 2016–2019, Maryna Bardina was an assistant consultant to the People's Deputy of Ukraine Serhiy Leshchenko. From 2015 to 2016, she was a parliamentary intern of the National Democratic Institute for the inter-factional parliamentary association "Euro-Optimists".

=== Social activities ===
Bardina studied local self-government and the procedure for creating and functioning communities in Austria. She is a member of the Association of the "Youth Will Change Ukraine" program of the Bohdan Havrylyshyn Charitable Foundation. Bardina ran for the Vyshenkiv village council of the Boryspil district of the Kyiv region.

Since 2011, she has been researching human rights issues in the field of gender equality. Co-founder of the "Equality Time" public organization. Bardina is the author of a number of scientific articles on gender topics.

=== Political career ===
Before being elected to the Parliament of Ukraine, Bardina was an expert on equality of rights and opportunities for men and women in the President of Ukraine Volodymyr Zelenskyy team. She was the Candidate for People's Deputies from the Servant of the People party in the 2019 parliamentary elections, No. 62 on the list.
