= Volodymyr Kozak (politician, born 1984) =

Ukrainian politician, lawyer, and entrepreneur

- Володимир Козак
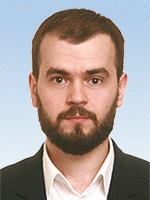

Member of the Verkhovna Rada
- Incumbent
- Assumed office 29 August 2019

Personal details
- Born: Volodymyr Vasylovych Kozak; 9 June 1984 (age 41) Romankivtsi, Ukrainian SSR, Soviet Union
- Party: Servant of the People

Volodymyr Vasylovych Kozak (Ukrainian: Володимир Васильович Козак; born on 9 June 1984) is a Ukrainian politician, lawyer, and entrepreneur, who is currently a member of parliament, and People's Deputy of Ukraine of the 9th convocation of the Verkhovna Rada since 29 August 2019.

== Biography ==
Kozak was born on 9 June 1984.

He graduated from the Faculty of Law of Taras Shevchenko National University of Kyiv, received a bachelor's degree in law. He studied at the National Academy of Public Administration under the President of Ukraine, where he obtained a master's degree (specialty "Public administration - management of social processes".

He is an expert on export and investment attraction issues.

He held the position of director of "Bukovynskyi Sad" LLC, worked as a legal advisor of the "Svarog West Group" corporation.

Kozak was a candidate for People's Deputies from the Servant of the People party in the 2019 parliamentary elections, No. 68 on the list. At the time of the elections, he was a natural person-entrepreneur, an independent, and lives in Kyiv.

He is a member of the Verkhovna Rada Committee on Transport and Infrastructure.
