= Lada Bulakh =

Ukrainian politician (born 1976)

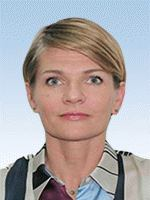
Lada Bulakh

Lada Valentynivna Bulakh (born 11 February 1976) is a Ukrainian public and political figure. People’s Deputy of the Verkhovna Rada of Ukraine of the 9th convocation.

== Early life and education ==
Lada Bulakh graduated from the Kyiv Institute of Cultural and Social Relations (faculties of psychology and sociology). She studied at the National Academy of Labor and Social Management. Bulakh received a diploma from the International Institute of Management (NGO management course). She graduated from the Ukrainian Catholic University, majoring in "Management of non-governmental organizations, project management."

In 2021, Bulakh graduated from the Master's Programme of the National Academy of Public Administration under the President of Ukraine.

== Career ==
Lada Bulakh was the executive director of charitable organization "100% of Life. Kyiv region." Bulakh worked in charitable organizations and aid centers, advancing her career from Social Worker to Manager. She founded the social enterprise "Myti" (“Moments”).

Bulakh was engaged in social activities (needs of people with tuberculosis, HIV/AIDS, orphans, women who have experienced family violence, refugees, and veterans of the Ukrainian Anti-Terrorist Operation).

=== Political activity ===
In 2019, Bulakh ran for the parliamentary elections from the Sluha Narodu (Servant of the People) party. At the time of the elections, she was the executive director of the charitable organization "100% Life. Kyiv region".

Bulakh is a Verkhovna Rada Committee on National Health, Medical Care, and Health Insurance member. She is a Head of the subcommittee on ensuring epidemic safety, and combating HIV/AIDS and socially dangerous diseases.

Bulakh is a member of the inter-factional associations "Equal Opportunities", "Parliamentary Platform to Fight Tuberculosis," and "For Accelerated European Integration of Ukrainian Business." She is the secretary of the group for inter-parliamentary relations with the Republic of North Macedonia, a member of the groups for inter-parliamentary relations with the United States of America, the Kingdom of Spain, the Kingdom of Denmark, the Swiss Confederation, and the State of Israel.
