= Nina Yuzhanina =

Ukrainian economist and politician

Nina Petrivna Yuzhanina
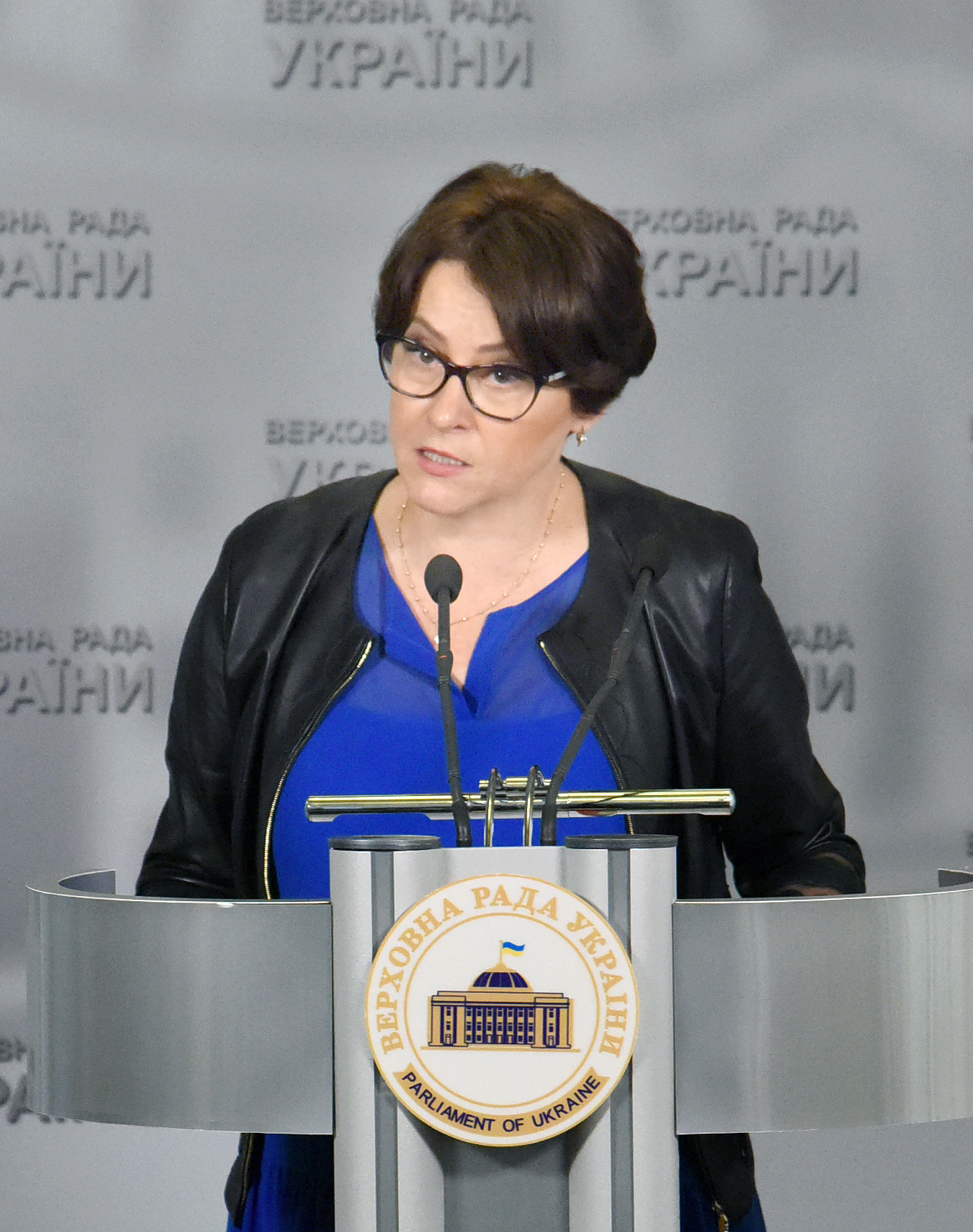

People's Deputy of Ukraine
- Incumbent
- Assumed office November 27, 2014

Personal details
- Born: January 11, 1965 (age 61) Ukraine
- Education: Khmelnytskyi National University

Nina Petrivna Yuzhanina (Ukrainian: Ніна Петрівна Южаніна; was born on January 11, 1965) – a Ukrainian economist and politician. People's Deputy of Ukraine since the 2014 Ukrainian parliamentary election.

== Biography ==
Yuzhanina was born on January 11, 1965. She graduated from Technological University of Podilia on specialty «Book keeping, control and business activity analysis».

From 1983 till 2003 she had been working as a bookkeeper, as an economist, as a main bookkeeper; had been working at the Ministry of Finance, in the tax authorities which were part of the Ministry of Finance had been heading the audit department; for some time had been working at the state tax police.

In 2003 she got a certificate of auditor, given by Chamber of Auditors of Ukraine. Also in 2003, founded the European Audit Group.

In the 2014 Ukrainian parliamentary election she was elected according to Perto Poroshenko Block, sequence number 28 in the list, she became a people's deputy of Ukraine. Since May 13, 2015 Nina Yuzhanina's post is a chairperson of the Verkhovna Rada of Ukraine Committee on Taxation and Customs Policy.

Yuzhanina was re-elected to parliament (as number 14 of the party's election list) for European Solidarity in the 2019 Ukrainian parliamentary election.

== Work in Parliament ==
During Parliamentary elections in Ukraine which took place on October 26, 2014, she was elected according to Perto Poroshenko Block, sequence number 28 in the list, she became a people's deputy of Ukraine of the VIIIth convocation. Since May 13, 2015 Nina Yuzhanina's post is a chairperson of the Verkhovna Rada of Ukraine Committee on Taxation and Customs Policy A vice-deputy of the member of Permanent Delegation of Assembly of Organization of Assembly of the Black Economic Cooperation.

- The member of group of interparliament tights with the United Kingdom of Great Britain and Northern Ireland.
- The member of group of interparliament tights with the Republic of Italy.
- The member of group of interparliament tights with the Republic of Poland.
- The member of group of interparliament tights with Chinese People's Republic.
- The member of group of interparliament tights with the Netherlands Kingdom.

== Law Activity ==
Nina Yuzhanina is an author and co-author of 198 draft legislative initiatives, 58 of which have already become laws. This is a raw of draft laws by which the changes to the Tax Code of Ukraine are made (as for the defense industry production tax exemption; as for the improvement of investment climate in Ukraine in the part of changes in administrative taxation; as for simplification of license procedures in the sphere of international economic activity; as for stimulating the development of the market of transport means use; as for consumer waste dumping taxation etc.).

Nina Yuzhanina is first of all famous as an author of liberal tax reform according to which a considerable reduction of the main taxes rates is determined, simplification of their administrating, introduction of the capital transfer tax instead of the tax on enterprises’ income etc. The given draft law was registered in the Verkhovna Rada as No.3357 in October, 2015, more than 120 people's deputies signed the document.

Most of draft law No.3357 initiatives in its part as for tax administrating improvement became the basis of the Law of Ukraine No.1797 «About introduction of changes to the Tax Code of Ukraine as for the improvement of the investment climate of Ukraine». Among them is: introduction of a single register of applications about the giving back the budget replacement of value added tax (VAT) (automatic Vat giving back); replacement of control-checking work of State Fiscal Service to the regional level, leaving only service functions to the regional tax inspections; announcement of annual plan-scheme of documents checking according to the plan on the site of State Fiscal Service (SFS); since 2018 introduction of Electronic Cabinet work of the tax payer to the full extend; transfer the right to give generalized tax consultations from SFS to the Ministry of Finances.

In summer, 2017 under Nina Yuzhanina's initiative the Law of Ukraine No.2143 was taken «About the introduction of changed to subsection 10 chapter ХХ of the Tax Code of Ukraine (as for the non-imposing of penal sanctions for out-of-time tax registration and excise acceptance note as a result of non-sanctioned interference in the work of computer networks of tax payers), that gave a possibility to minimize the aftereffects of a mass cyber attack of tax payers. Much of Nina Yuzhanina’s attention was paid to the renovation of an auditor as a profession, introduction of accountancy and financial report making at Ukrainian enterprises taking into account European rules. She worked at this together with the representatives of professional association, Euro committee and the World bank experts. We speak about laws №2164 «About introduction the changes to the Law of Ukraine «About accountancy and financial reports in Ukraine» (as for improvement of some items) and No.2258 «About audit of financial reports and audit activity» taken by the parliament in 2017. To create in Ukraine more favorable conditions to produce cinema production and develop cinematography on the whole Nina Yuzhanina prepared co-authored laws No.2176 and 2177 as for introduction of certain changes to Tax and Customs Codes. Taken in December Law No.2245 «About introduction of changes to the Tax Code of Ukraine as for providing balanced budget benefits in 2018», which was thoroughly worked over by the Committee headed by Nina Yuzhanina on the basis of the draft law, directed also to award foreseen state's policy in the part of excise goods taxation. Thus, up to 2025 a gradual increase in specific rates of excise tax on tobacco goods, abolishment of imperative norm as for annual increase of excise tax rates to the index of customer prices is foreseen.

In March, 2018 Nina Yuzhanina registered co-authored draft law No.8157 «About National Office of financial security of Ukraine» worked over together with European colleagues. In case it is taken in our country a single body in opposition to commercial crimes instead of all existing ones will appear (Tax Police, economic subdivisions of Security Service of Ukraine and National Police). For business it means cutting down interference into its activity as the new body's work for 2/3 will include analytical one, it will be possible to start criminal interference after the whole procedure of fending off access additional sums of money.

In June, 2018 Nina Yuzhanina initiated draft laws No.8487 and No.8488, which are aimed at solving the problem of cars with European numbers. It is meant to eliminate the excise tax rates in case of car import and strengthening of control over transporting and the use of transport means, registered in other countries.

== Private life ==
She lives in Kyiv, married, has a son and a grandson.
