= Mykhailo Ananchenko =

Ukrainian politician (born 1994)

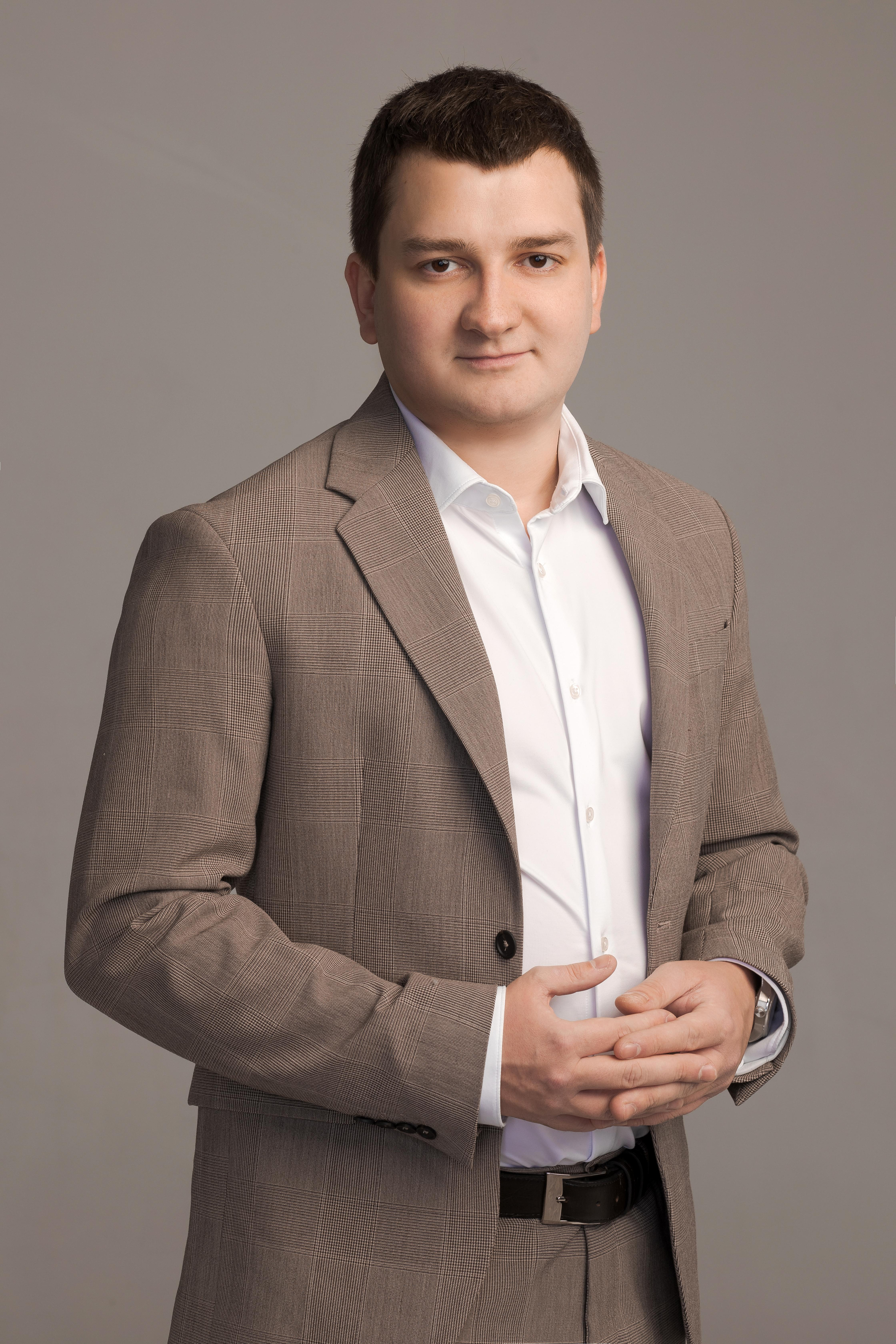
- Ananchenko in 2021

Member of the Verkhovna Rada
- Incumbent
- Assumed office 29 August 2019

Personal details
- Born: 17 November 1994 (age 31)
- Party: Servant of the People

Mykhailo Olehovych Ananchenko (Ukrainian: Михайло Олегович Ананченко; born 17 November 1994) is a Ukrainian politician serving as a member of the Verkhovna Rada since 2019. He has served as chairman of Servant of the People in Sumy Oblast since 2020.
