= Andrii Kholodov =

Ukrainian businessman and politician

- Андрій Холодов
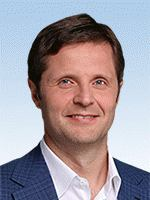

People's Deputy of Ukraine
- In office 29 August 2019 – 8 August 2023

Personal details
- Born: 20 August 1972 (age 53) Kremenchuk, Ukrainian SSR, Soviet Union (now Ukraine)
- Party: Servant of the People

Andrii Ivanovych Kholodov (Ukrainian: Андрій Іванович Холодов; born 20 August 1972) is a Ukrainian businessman and politician and former People's Deputy of Ukraine (in the 9th Ukrainian Verkhovna Rada).

== Biography ==
Andrii Kholodov was born in 1972. Graduated from Kyiv National Transport University (faculty of Automobiles and Automobile Industry). From 1998 began to do his own business on rental and sales of commercial and residential property, development, business consulting and other types of economic activities. Was held the position of deputy director – director on foreign economic activity in the limited liability company ‘Tekam Plus’. From 2005 was a co-owner of the factory ‘Efkon-vikna’ that produces an aluminum profile and other metal building structures. In addition, he owns LLC ‘Favorit-M’, registered in Kyiv.

== Political activity ==
Candidate for people’s deputies from the political party Servant of the People in the 2019 Ukrainian parliamentary elections, № 22 on the list. On August 29, 2019, he was installed as People’s Deputy of Ukraine of the IX convocation. Deputy Chairperson of the Verkhovna Rada Committee of Ukraine on Finance, Taxation and Customs Policy. Member of a group for inter-parliamentary relations with the Republic of Korea. Member of a group for inter-parliamentary relations with the Republic of Kazakhstan. Member of a group for inter-parliamentary relations with the United Kingdom of Great Britain and Northern Ireland. Member of a group for inter-parliamentary relations with the United States of America.

In January 2023, Kholodov left Ukraine and he stopped to attend parliamentary sessions. Kholodov claimed he left the country to take care of his sick wife and child. On 31 July, he sent his letter of resignation from parliament and was excluded from Servant of the People. On 8 August 2023 parliament terminated the parliamentary powers of Kholodov.

== Family ==
The wife of Andrii Kholodov is designer Kateryna Shakhovska, who also designs clothing for Oksana Marchenko.

Journalists from the program *Schemes* claim that Kholodov is a godfather to the wife of pro-Russian oligarch Viktor Medvedchuk, Oksana Marchenko. The leader of the "Servant of the People" party, Dmytro Razumkov, stated that the candidate’s family ties with the family of the godfather of the Russian president are not grounds for excluding the candidate from the party.

In October 2020, Kholodov attended the wedding of Viktor Medvedchuk’s stepson.

== Criticism and a lawsuit ==
In November 2019, journalists of the Schemes program of the Ukrainian edition of Radio Liberty published an investigation in which they proved that MP Kholodov's family was connected to the cigarette distribution business, pointed to possible tax violations, and exposed him for lobbying the Verkhovna Rada to improve the conditions for doing business.

In July 2020, the NACP found a real conflict of interest in MP Kholodov, the case was referred to court, and the MP faces a fine.

On August 27, 2020, Kholodov filed a lawsuit with the Shevchenkivskyi District Court of Kyiv, asking to "recognize as unreliable the information" disseminated in the investigation. However, on the day of the first preparatory hearing, he filed a written statement "to leave the claim without consideration." Neither Kholodov nor his representative appeared at the hearing. On March 25, 2021, the Shevchenkivskyi Court decided to "leave the claim without consideration".
