= Oleksandr Vasiuk =

Ukrainian politician (born 1994)

Oleksandr Vasiuk Member of the Ukrainian Parliament
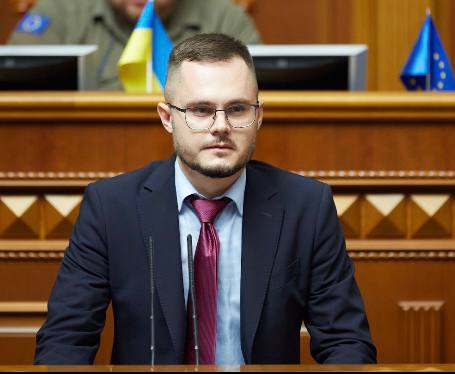
- Born: December 28, 1994 (age 31); Zaporizhzhia
- Education: Yaroslav Mudryi National Law University
- Occupations: Politician; lawyer

Oleksandr Vasiuk (Ukrainian: Олександр Олександрович Васюк; born 28 December 1994) is a Ukrainian politician and lawyer. He is a Member of the Ukrainian Parliament. and belongs the presidential faction named “Sluha Narodu” (Servant of the People), member of the Verkhovna Rada of Ukraine Committee on Legal Policy, head of the inter-factional parliamentary association "Ukraine-US Strategic Partnership".

Chairman of the Parliamentary Friendship Group for Interparliamentary Relations with the Principality of Liechtenstein and chairman of the inter-factional parliamentary association “Partnership between Ukraine and the Sovereign Order of Malta”.

== Early life and education ==
Oleksandr Vasiuk was born on December 28, 1994, in the city of Zaporizhzhia. Graduated from the Law Faculty of Yaroslav Mudryi Kharkiv Law University. During the presidential campaign in 2019, he coordinated the team of lawyers of the current President of Ukraine Volodymyr Zelenskyy.

== Political career ==
On August 2, 2022, Oleksandr Vasiuk was elected as a Member of the Ukrainian Parliament from party “Sluga Narodu”.

On August 30, 2022, he took the oath of office of the People's Deputy of Ukraine.

Oleksandr Vasiuk leads the Strategic Partnership Ukraine-USA coalition. He is a top Ukrainian official responsible for overseeing dialogue with the US.

Oleksandr Vasiuk is a member of the Verkhovna Rada Committee on Legal Policy. He was elected head of the inter-factional deputy association "Ukraine-US Strategic Partnership". In recent years, the main goal is to expand the Ukrainian-American partnership based on a common vision of democracy, economic and social prosperity of both countries.

== See also ==
- List of members of the parliament of Ukraine, 2019–24
