= Serhiy Mahera =

Ukrainian businessman politician

- Сергій Магера
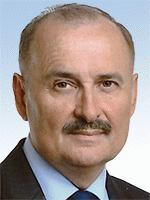
- Official portrait, 2019

People's Deputy of Ukraine
- Incumbent
- Assumed office 29 August 2019
- Preceded by: Serhiy Taruta
- Constituency: Donetsk Oblast, No. 58

Personal details
- Born: 8 November 1956 (age 69) Mariupol, Ukrainian SSR, Soviet Union (now Ukraine)
- Party: Independent
- Education: Taganrog Radio and Technical Institute; Donetsk National University

Serhiy Vasylovych Mahera (Ukrainian: Сергій Васильович Магера; born 8 November 1956) is a Ukrainian businessman and politician currently serving as a People's Deputy of Ukraine from Ukraine's 58th electoral district since 29 August 2019. Member of the Verkhovna Rada Committee on Environmental Policy and Nature Management, Chairman of the Subcommittee on Overcoming the Consequences of the Chernobyl Disaster. Previously a member of Opposition Bloc, he is not part of any faction in the Verkhovna Rada (Ukraine's parliament).

== Early life and career ==
Serhiy Vasylovych Mahera was born on 8 November 1956, in the city of Mariupol in southeastern Ukraine. He is a graduate of the Taganrog Radio and Technical Institute with a specialty in automation and telemechanics, and is a qualified electrical engineer. He additionally graduated from the Donetsk National University with a specialty in economic entrepreneurship.

From 1974 to 1977, Mahera worked at the Taganrog Radio and Technical Institute before entering the radio technology industry in Taganrog. In 1980, he began working for the Communist Party of the Soviet Union, acquiring high positions in the Komsomol and propaganda department of Taganrog. In 1988, he returned to his hometown of Mariupol, where he became a teacher of Soviet propaganda.

In 1990, Mahera left party life for corporate activity, founding the Mariupol-based "Format" corporation. He led the corporation until 1996, and he became head of the press service of Illich Steel and Iron Works the next year. He served in that position until 2013, at which point he moved to the public relations arm of Metinvest, where he briefly worked until returning to Illich Steel and Iron Works as the plant's director in 2016.

== Political career in independent Ukraine ==
From 2002, Mahera was a member of the Mariupol City Council. He participated in the social-ecological, budget, and finance commissions of the City Council.

Mahera first mounted a campaign to become a People's Deputy of Ukraine in the 2014 Ukrainian parliamentary election, running as the 51st candidate on the party list of Opposition Bloc. At the time of the election, he was an independent. However, as Opposition Bloc only won 27 party list seats, Mahera was not elected. In the 2019 Ukrainian parliamentary election, he ran again, this time in Ukraine's 58th electoral district. He was successfully elected, defeating next-closest candidate Viktor Romaniuk (of Servant of the People) with 30.49% of the vote to Romaniuk's 22.28%.

On 4 September 2020, Mahera was included in the list of Ukrainian individuals against whom sanctions were imposed by the Russian government.

=== People's Deputy of Ukraine ===
In the Verkhovna Rada (Ukraine's parliament), Mahera sits as an independent, and is unaffiliated with any faction. Until 2022, when he joined the Verkhovna Rada Committee on Ecological Issues and Forest Management, he was not a member of any committee. In 2019, he declared a monthly salary of ₴4.09 million in his capacity as director of Illich Steel and Iron Works.
