= Viktoriya Valentynivna Podhorna =

Ukrainian entrepreneur and politician

Viktoriya Podhorna
- Вікторія Подгорна
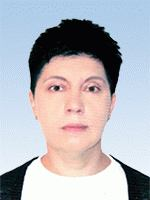

Member of the Verkhovna Rada
- Incumbent
- Assumed office 29 August 2019

Personal details
- Born: 10 February 1969 (age 57) Snizhne, Ukrainian SSR, Soviet Union
- Party: Servant of the People

Victoria Valentinovna Podgorna (Ukrainian: Вікторія Валентинівна Подгорна; born February 10, 1969, Snizhne, Donetsk Oblast, Ukrainian SSR) is a Ukrainian entrepreneur and politician. In the Verkhovna Rada of the 6th convocation, she was an assistant to the pro-Russian politician and statesman Natalia Korolevska. She is a People's Deputy of Ukraine of the 9th convocation.

== Biography ==
She graduated from the Faculty of Political Science of Kharkiv State University (specialty "History, Political Science"). She studied in graduate school at the Department of Philosophy of Kharkiv State University. Candidate of Philosophical Sciences in Social Philosophy.

She was the head of the project "Management Consulting Groups" and worked as a chief consultant of the National Institute for Strategic Studies.

She is the chairperson of the Board, founder and executive director of the NGO "Public Council of Smart City". She lives in Kyiv.

In the Verkhovna Rada of the 6th convocation, she was an assistant to the pro-Russian politician and stateswoman Natalia Korolevska.

Podgornaya is a member of the Coordination Council for the Development of the Digital Economy and Society. Expert of the NGO "High-tech Office Ukraine".

She was a candidate for People's Deputies from the "Servant of the People" party in the 2019 parliamentary elections, № 128 on the list.

She has been a member of the Verkhovna Rada Committee on Digital Transformation and co-chair of the group for interparliamentary relations with the Kingdom of Denmark.
