= Olha Sovhyria =

Ukrainian jurist (born 1980)

- Ольга Совгиря
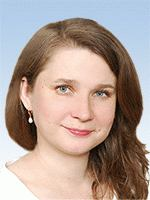

Judge of the Constitutional Court of Ukraine
- Incumbent
- Assumed office 27 July 2022
- Nominated by: Verkhovna Rada

Member of the Verkhovna Rada
- In office 29 August 2019 – 27 July 2022

Personal details
- Born: Olha Volodymyrivna Sovhyria; 6 August 1980 (age 46) Kyiv, Soviet Union
- Party: Servant of the People
- Education: Taras Shevchenko National University of Kyiv

Olha Volodymyrivna Sovhyria (Ukrainian: Ольга Володимирівна Совгиря; born on 6 August 1980) is a Ukrainian jurist, lawyer, and former politician who is currently a judge of the Judge of the Constitutional Court of Ukraine since 27 July 2022.

She had previously served as the Member of the Verkhovna Rada from 2019 to 2022, representing the Constitutional Court of Ukraine.

== Biography ==
Olha Sovhryia was born in Kyiv on 6 August 1980.

She graduated from the law faculty of Shevchenko Kyiv National University. She is a Doctor of legal sciences, professor, and the Professor of the Department of Constitutional Law of the Faculty of Law of Shevchenko KNU. Професор кафедри конституційного права юридичного факультету КНУ імені Шевченка.

Sovhyria is the author of more than 170 scientific works. She is a specialist in constitutional law.

In 2010, following an appeal by the people's deputies and the third President of Ukraine, Viktor Yushchenko, regarding the interpretation of the provisions of the Constitution regarding the limitation of terms of placement of foreign military bases, the Constitutional Court requested a scientific opinion. It was provided by Sovgyrha herself. The conclusion stated that this issue "should not be considered by the Constitutional Court (...) because the interpretation (...) in this case is impossible and may lead to the intervention of the Constitutional Court of Ukraine in political issues.".

In 2019, Sovhyhria was elected a member of parliament, a People's Deputy of Ukraine of the Verkhovna Rada from the pro-government party "Servant of the People".

She had been the Deputy Chairman of the Verkhovna Rada Committee on Legal Policy, Chairman of the Subcommittee on Political Reform and Constitutional Law.

She had also been the co-chairman of the group on inter-parliamentary relations with Argentina.

On 16 October 2019, Sovhyria was appointed a permanent representative of the Verkhovna Rada in the Constitutional Court of Ukraine.

On 27 July 2022, the Verkhovna Rada appointed her as a judge of the Constitutional Court of Ukraine, after which she became a People's Deputy.

On 2 August 2022, at a solemn meeting of the Constitutional Court, she officially took the oath of a judge, and received a certificate.
