= Dragobrat =

Mountain in Ukraine

Dragobrat / Drahobrat
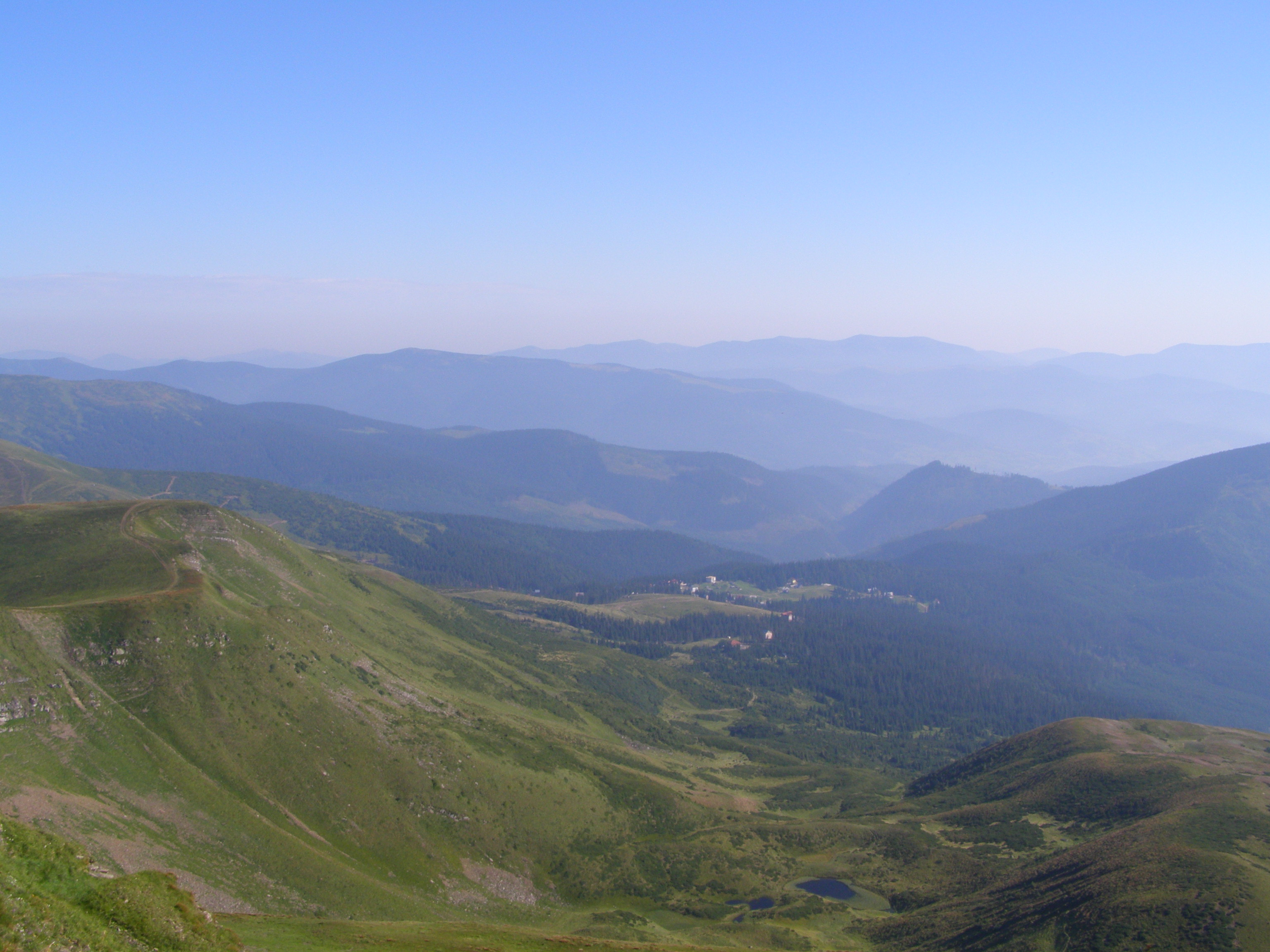

Highest point
- Elevation: 1,763 m (5,784 ft)
- Coordinates: 48.246511°N 24.237986°E

Naming
- Etymology: felling

Geography
- Location: Ukraine

Dragobrat is a mountain of the Urdu-Flavantuch mountain range in the eastern part of the Svydovets massif (Ukrainian Carpathians). It is located in the Rakhiv district of the Zakarpattia region, between the rivers Chorna Tysa and Kosivska.

== Geography ==
The name of the peak "Dragobrat" means: felling – that is, the place, the area where the forest was cut down.

Dragobat is located in the Rakhiv district of the Transcarpathian region. The mountain is surrounded by two rivers – Kosovskaya and Black Tisa. These mountains feed on streams falling from the top of Dragobrat. The height of the mountain is over 1700 metres. Two slopes are very steep, but the southern and northern ones are relatively gentle. Therefore, climbing the mountain will be interesting for both a beginner and a professional climber.

The mountain is part of the Carpathian reserve. Among other things, many rare plants grow on the mountain, some of them are listed in the Red Book.

== Tourism ==
Dragobrat is the highest ski resort in the Ukrainian Carpathians. It is located at an altitude of 1300–1700 metres above sea level, at a distance of 7 km from the village of Yasinya, at the junction of coniferous forests and the alpine zone, on the spurs of the Svydovets massif, at the foot of Mount Stig (1701 m) and Blyznytsia (1882 m).

From here you have views of the highest massif of the Ukrainian Carpathians – Chornohora, you can see the tops of the mountains Hoverla (2061 m), Petros (2020 m).

On the other side you can see the highest ridges Gorgan – Doboshanka (1754 m), Sinyak (1662 m) and others.

== Link ==
- Dragobrat
- Panoramic view of Dragobrat
