= Oleksandr Marikovskyi =

Ukrainian economist and politician

Oleksander Marikovskyi
- Олександр Маріковський
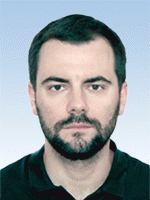

Member of the Verkhovna Rada
- Incumbent
- Assumed office 29 August 2019

Personal details
- Born: Oleksander Valeriiovych Marikovskyi; 18 September 1982 (age 43) Kyiv, Soviet Union
- Party: Servant of the People

Oleksander Valeriiovych Marikovskyi (Ukrainian: Олександр Валерійович Маріковський; born on 18 September 1982) is a Ukrainian economist and politician, who is currently a member of the Member of the Verkhovna Rada of the 9th convocation. He is the Deputy Chairman of the Committee on Environmental Policy in the Verkhovna Rada of Ukraine of the 9th convocation 29 August 2019.

== Biography ==
Oleksander Marikovskyi was born in Kyiv on 18 September 1982.

He graduated from Taras Shevchenko Kyiv National University. He received a master's degree with honors. He graduated from the Ukrainian School of Political Studies in 2014.

He was an active member of VGO "Avtomaidan".

He was a member of the Public Council under the Ministry of Natural Resources.

He was the acting adviser to the State Secretary of the Ministry of Information Policy of Ukraine.

He is a developer of GovVoice, a centralized government communications management model, and a developer of the database of registration of environmental problems. Marikovsky is also an expert in information policy, e-government, ecology, and anti-corruption policy.

On 12 December 2019, Marikovsky became a member of the "Humane Country" inter-factional association, created at the initiative of UAnimals to popularize humanistic values and protect animals from cruelty.

He had been a candidate for People's Deputies from the Servant of the People party in the 2019 parliamentary elections, No. 91 on the list. At the time of the elections, he was the general director of Mediateka LLC, and is an independent, and lives in Kyiv.

== Fight in Turkey ==
On 4 May 2023, during the activities of the Black Sea Economic Cooperation Organization Parliamentary Assembly in Ankara, Turkey, a Russian delegate snatched the Ukrainian flag from his hands. Marikovskyi responded to the assault and theft of the flag by pursuing the Russian delegate to retrieve the flag at which time a brief scuffle occurred.

The Russian state-owned RIA Novosti news agency stated that the Russian Embassy in Ankara clarified that the Russian delegate is undergoing a medical examination and has been provided with consular assistance.
