= Liudmyla Buimister =

Ukrainian politician

- Людмила Буймістер
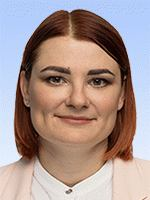
- Official portrait, 2019

People's Deputy of Ukraine
- Incumbent
- Assumed office 29 August 2019
- Preceded by: Yurii Levchenko
- Constituency: Kyiv, No. 223

Personal details
- Born: 5 November 1985 (age 40) Moscow, Russian SFSR, Soviet Union (now Russia)
- Party: Independent
- Other political affiliations: Servant of the People (2019–2021)
- Education: Moscow State Institute of International Relations; London Business School

Liudmyla Anatoliivna Buimister (Ukrainian: Людмила Анатоліївна Буймістер; born 5 November 1985) is a Ukrainian politician currently serving, as a People's Deputy of Ukraine from Ukraine's 223rd electoral district, located in western Kyiv, since 2019. Elected as a member of the Servant of the People, she is currently an independent.

== Early life and education ==
Buimister was born into a family of diplomats. She graduated from the Moscow State Institute of International Relations with a degree in "International Public Law" and the London Business School, where she majored in "Corporate Finance: Business Assessment, Risk, Restructuring").

== Career ==
Buimister worked in the "Industrial Group" consortium. From 2012 to 2018, she served as director of the Gdańsk Shipyard, where she was a specialist in the field of new energy, recycling and environmental policy. Since April 2018, she has been engaged in consulting in the field of alternative energy and sustainable development. She headed the film distribution company "Kinomania".

In 2019, Buimister became a candidate for people's deputies from the Servant of the People in the parliamentary elections (electoral district No. 223, Shevchenkivskyi District of Kyiv). At the time of the elections, she was a member of the supervisory board of the Dunaferr Metallurgical Plant (Hungary), non-partisan, and resided in Kyiv.

Buimister is a person close to businessman and politician Serhiy Taruta. She is co-chairman of the group on inter-parliamentary relations with France. She is a member of the Permanent Delegation to the NATO Parliamentary Assembly. She is also co-chairman of the group on inter-parliamentary relations with Romania. On 19 October 2021, Buimister was expelled from the Servant of the People.

== Personal life ==
Buimister is married to Serhiy Zhuravel, an architect and assistant on a voluntary basis. She has two daughters, Anastasia from the first marriage, and Viktoriya from the second marriage.
