= Serhiy Shvets (politician) =

Ukrainian politician (1976–2025)

- Сергій Швець
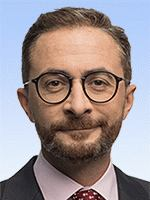
- Shvets in 2019

People's Deputy of Ukraine
- In office 29 August 2019 – 28 May 2025

Personal details
- Born: Serhiy Fedorovych Shvets; 13 June 1976 Cherkasy, Ukrainian SSR, USSR
- Died: 28 May 2025 (aged 48)
- Party: SN
- Education: National University of Kyiv-Mohyla Academy; Kyiv National Economic University
- Occupation: TV analyst

Serhiy Fedorovych Shvets (Ukrainian: Сергій Федорович Швець; 13 June 1976 – 28 May 2025) was a Ukrainian politician. A member of Servant of the People, he served in the Verkhovna Rada from 2019 to 2025.

Shvets died of laryngeal cancer on 28 May 2025, at the age of 48.
