= Pavlo Sushko =

Ukrainian politician and film producer

- Павло Сушко
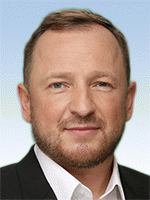

People's Deputy of Ukraine
- Incumbent
- Assumed office 29 August 2019
- President: Volodymyr Zelenskyy

Deputy Head of the parliamentary fraction of the Servant of the People political party
- Incumbent
- Assumed office 29 September 2019
- Prime Minister: Denys Shmyhal

Chairman of the Cinematography and Advertisement Sub-Committee of the Committee on Humanitarian and Information Policy of the Verkhovna Rada
- Incumbent
- Assumed office 29 September 2019
- Prime Minister: Denys Shmyhal

Deputy Chairman of the Verkhovna Rada Committee for Humanitarian and Information Policy
- Incumbent
- Assumed office 18 June 2020

Personal details
- Born: Pavlo Mykolayovych Sushko; 16 November 1979 (age 46) Khmelnytska Oblast, Ukrainian SSR, Soviet Union
- Party: Servant of the People
- Education: National Academy of the State Border Guard Service of Ukraine named after Bohdan Khmelnytsky; Yaroslav Mudryi National Law University; Kyiv National University of Culture and Arts
- Occupation: Film producer

Pavlo Mykolayovych Sushko (born 16 November 1979, Khmelnytskyi Oblast) is a Ukrainian politician, film producer. He is a member of the Public Council of the Ukrainian Oscar Committee, member of the European Film Academy, and is the People's deputy of Ukraine elected in the 2019 Ukrainian parliamentary election for Servant of the People.

== Biography ==
Sushko was born on 16 November 1979 in Khmelnytskyi Oblast and has lived in Kharkiv Oblast since 2000. He graduated with honours from the Bohdan Khmelnytsky National Academy of the State Border Guard (military specialty – tactical and operational officer). Lieutenant Colonel of the Reserve. He held senior positions in the State Border Guard Service of Ukraine (served in the Kharkiv Border Detachment for 14 years) for 18 years.

In 2010 he graduated from the Yaroslav Mudryi National Law University. In 2013 he graduated from the Kyiv National University of Culture and Arts majoring in “Cinema and TV arts” (television director). In 2016 he joined the film company "Solar Media Entertainment" and became the producer of the feature film “DZIDZIO Contrabass”, which was the first profitable film in the history of Ukrainian cinema.

Since 2017 he has been lecturing and conducting master classes for students in film production. Since 2017 he has been the member of the Ukrainian Film Academy. In 2018 he was the chairman of the jury of the Zaporizhia International Short Film Festival ZIFF. In 2018 he became a member of the European Film Academy.

In 2018 he founded the Prime Story Pictures film company. In 2018 he was awarded the Golden Spinning Top (Viewer's choice) for the film “DZIDZIO Contrabass”.

== Political activity ==
- Deputy Head of the parliamentary fraction of the Servant of the People political party
- Deputy Chairman of the Verkhovna Rada Committee for Humanitarian and Information Policy
- Chairman of the Cinematography and Advertisement Sub-Committee of the Committee on Humanitarian and Information Policy of the Verkhovna Rada of Ukraine
- Chairman of the Kharkiv Oblast Regional Organization of the Servant of the People party
- Member of the Ukrainian part of the Inter-Parliamentary Assembly of the Verkhovna Rada of Ukraine and the Seimas of the Republic of Lithuania
- Deputy Co-chairman of the Inter-Parliamentary Liaison Group with the French Republic
- Member of the Inter-Parliamentary Liaison Group with the United States of America
- Member of the Inter-Parliamentary Liaison Group with the Republic of Poland
- Member of the Inter-Parliamentary Liaison Group with Canada
- Deputy Co-chairman of the Inter-Parliamentary Liaison Group with the Swiss Confederation
- Deputy Co-chairman of the Inter-Parliamentary Liaison Group with the Federal Republic of Germany

== Awards ==
The Golden Spinning Top from the Ukrainian Film Academy in the category "Viewer’s choice" as the producer of the film "DZIDZIO Contrabass" (Ukraine. Director O. Borshchevskyi).

Medal "For Honourable Service" of the 3rd degree – awarded by Decree # 347/2009 of the President of Ukraine.

Medals and decorations awarded by Orders of the Head of the State Border Guard Service of Ukraine:

- Medal for Courage in Defending the Ukrainian State Border
- The Golden Spinning Top from the Ukrainian Film Academy in the category “Viewer’s choice” as the producer of the film “DZIDZIO Contrabass” (Ukraine. Director O. Decoration for Honourable Service in the State Border Service of Ukraine
- The Golden Spinning Top from the Ukrainian Film Academy in the category “Viewer’s choice” as the producer of the film “DZIDZIO Contrabass” (Ukraine. Director O. Medal of the State Border Service of Ukraine "For Faith and Fidelity"
- 15 years of Honourable Service Medal
- 15 years the State Border Service of Ukraine MedalThe Golden Spinning Top from the Ukrainian Film Academy in the category “Viewer’s choice” as the producer of the film “DZIDZIO Contrabass” (Ukraine. Director O.
- 20 Years of Independence of Ukraine Medal
- 20 years the State Border Service of Ukraine MedalThe Golden Spinning Top from the Ukrainian Film Academy in the category “Viewer’s choice” as the producer of the film “DZIDZIO Contrabass” (Ukraine. Director O.
- Border Service Decoration
- Excellent Border Guard Badge of II class
- 20 Years of the Eastern Regional Department Decoration
- 20 Years of the Kharkiv Border Detachment Decoration

He was also awarded certificates of merit and diplomas from the commanders of the State Border Service of Ukraine, Khmelnitsky and Kharkiv Regional Administrations.
