= 2019 Ukrainian parliamentary election =

- 21 July 2019

424 of the 450 seats in the Verkhovna Rada (Note: 26 seats were in occupied areas where elections could not take place.) 226 seats needed for a majority
- Opinion polls
- Turnout: 49.24% (▼2.67 pp)
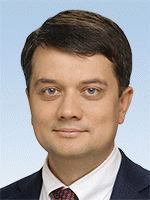

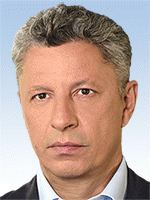

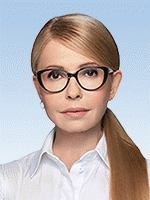

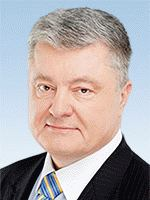

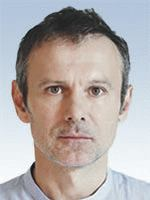
	First party	Second party	Third party
Leader	Dmytro Razumkov	Yuriy Boyko	Yulia Tymoshenko
Party	Servant of the People	Opposition Platform	Batkivshchyna
Leader since	27 May 2019	9 November 2018	9 July 1999
Leader's seat	Party list	Party list	Party list
Last election	New	New	20 seats, 5.68%
Seats won	254	43	26
Seat change	New	New	▲6
Popular vote	6,307,793	1,908,111	1,196,303
Percentage	43.16% (PR)	13.06% (PR)	8.19% (PR)
Swing	New	New	▲2.51
	Fourth party	Fifth party
Leader	Petro Poroshenko	Sviatoslav Vakarchuk
Party	European Solidarity	Holos
Leader since	31 May 2019	16 May 2019
Leader's seat	Party list	Party list
Last election	131 seat, 21.82%	New
Seats won	25	20
Seat change	▼106	New
Popular vote	1,184,620	851,722
Percentage	8.11% (PR)	5.83% (PR)
Swing	▼13.71%	New
Prime Minister before election
Volodymyr Groysman
USH
Elected Prime Minister
Oleksiy Honcharuk
Independent

Parliamentary elections were held in Ukraine on 21 July 2019. Originally scheduled to be held at the end of October, the elections were brought forward after newly inaugurated President Volodymyr Zelenskyy dissolved parliament on 21 May 2019, during his inauguration. The elections resulted in Zelenskyy's Servant of the People party winning an outright majority of seats with 254 seats (a first for any party during Ukraine's post-Soviet independence).

About 80 percent of the elected candidates were new to parliament, while 83 deputies were re-elected from the previous parliament and 13 deputies from earlier convocations. All deputies from Servant of the People were political newcomers. 61 percent of the new MPs had never before been engaged in politics.

The elections were suspended in 26 of the 225 constituencies due to the March 2014 annexation of Crimea by Russia and the ongoing occupation of parts of Donetsk Oblast and Luhansk Oblast by separatist forces of the self-declared Donetsk People's Republic and Luhansk People's Republic (since April 2014).

== Background ==
Originally scheduled to be held at the end of October 2019, the 2019 Ukrainian parliamentary elections were brought forward after newly inaugurated President Volodymyr Zelenskyy dissolved parliament early on 21 May 2019 (a day after his inauguration), despite claims that he did not have the legal grounds to do this. After Zelenskyy issued the decree (calling early elections), a lawsuit was filed to the Constitutional Court of Ukraine, which sought to declare the decree unconstitutional and therefore illegal. The court declared the decree to be legal on 20 June 2019. The official reason why Zelenskyy dissolved parliament was "a lack of a government coalition".

Following the 2014 parliamentary elections the Petro Poroshenko Bloc (PPB) party became the largest party, after securing 132 seats. On 21 November 2014, the Petro Poroshenko Bloc, People's Front, Self Reliance, Fatherland and the Radical Party all signed a coalition agreement. Arseniy Yatsenyuk became Prime Minister on 2 December 2014. The Radical Party left the coalition on 1 September 2015 in protest over a vote in parliament involving a change to the Ukrainian Constitution that would lead to decentralization and greater powers for areas held by separatists. February 2016 saw the start of the fall of the Yatsenyuk cabinet after the economy minister Aivaras Abromavičius announced his resignation claiming the government did not have real commitment to fight corruption. On 17 and 18 February 2016, the Fatherland and Self Reliance parties left the coalition; meaning that the coalition became 5 deputies short of the 226 needed. On 14 April 2016, Volodymyr Groysman became the new Prime Minister and the Groysman government began with a new cabinet of ministers. Due to the short period of time available to organize the 2019 parliamentary election, current Ukrainian public procurement laws were not followed and to bypass this, local election commissions will work under deferred payment.

== Electoral system ==
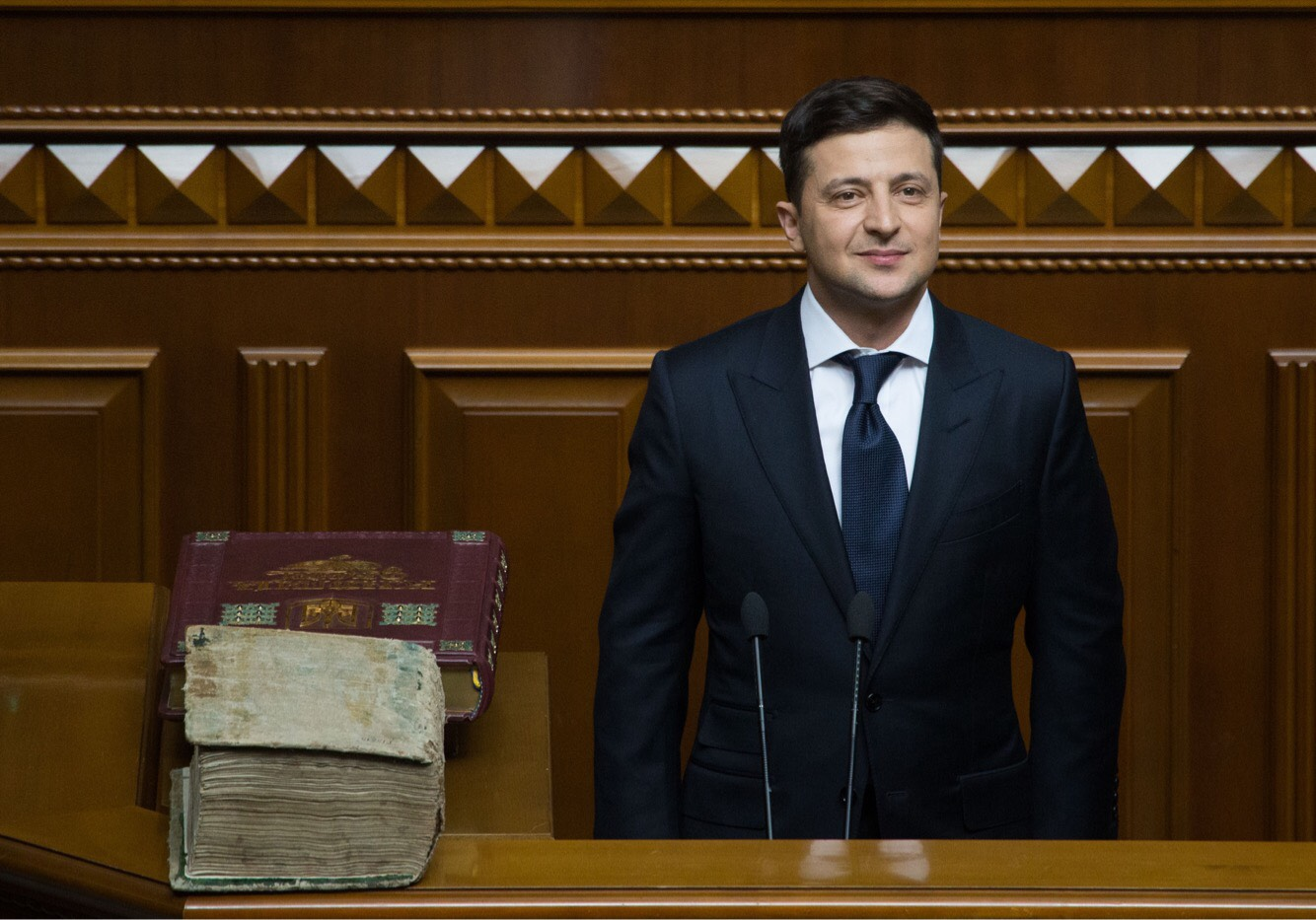
President Volodymyr Zelenskyy dissolved the Verkhovna Rada shortly after his inauguration, May 2019.

Under current law, 225 seats of the Verkhovna Rada are elected by nationwide closed list party-list proportional representation with 5% electoral threshold and 225 seats are elected in constituencies with a first-past-the-post electoral system in one round (candidate with the highest vote total wins). 21 parties take part in the election in the nationwide party-list. For the elections there was established a state financing for all political parties that received 2% support, but on 2 October 2019 that law was canceled.

Out of 225 constituencies, 26 were suspended due to the March 2014 annexation of Crimea by Russia and the occupation of parts of Donetsk Oblast and Luhansk Oblast by separatists (since April 2014).

Candidates had until 20 June to submit documents to the Central Election Commission of Ukraine to register as candidates for the position of deputy of the Verkhovna Rada. On 25 June 2019, the Central Election Commission ended its registration process. It registered 5,845 candidates for the elections: 3,171 candidates in the single-member constituencies and 2,674 candidates in the single nationwide constituency with 22 parties.

Since 2014, various politicians have proposed to reform the electoral system to 100% party-list proportional representation with open lists. President Zelenskyy is the main proponent. The proposal is opposed by Yulia Tymoshenko. A vote on the proposal (authored by the president) was supposed to take place on 22 May 2019, but members of parliament voted against including it in the agenda.

== Contesting parties ==
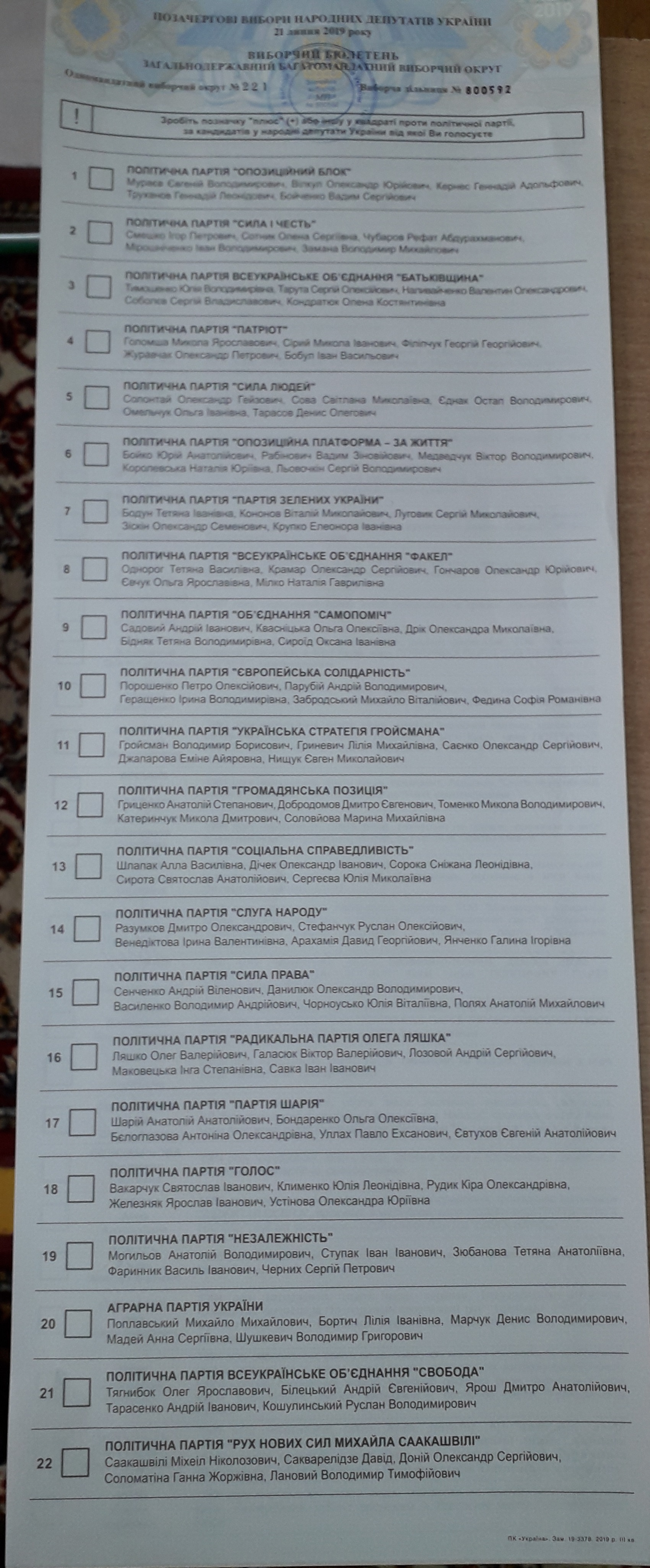
Electoral ballot of the 2019 Ukrainian parliamentary election, featuring 22 parties

List of registered parties

- Opposition Bloc (Evgeny Muraev)
- Strength and Honor (Ihor Smeshko)
- Fatherland (Yulia Tymoshenko)
- Patriot (Mykola Holomsha)
- Power of the People (Oleksandr Solotai)
- Opposition Platform — For Life (Yuriy Boyko / Vadim Rabinovich)
- Party of Greens of Ukraine (Tetyana Bodun)
- Torch (Tetyana Odnoroh)
- Self Reliance (Andriy Sadovyi)
- European Solidarity (Petro Poroshenko)
- Ukrainian Strategy of Groysman (Volodymyr Groysman)
- Civil Position (Anatoliy Hrytsenko)
- Social Justice (Alla Shlapak)
- Servant of the People (Dmytro Razumkov)
- Power of the Law (formerly Hope) (Andriy Senchenko)
- Radical Party of Oleh Lyashko (Oleh Lyashko)
- Party of Shariy (Anatoly Shariy)
- Voice (Svyatoslav Vakarchuk)
- Independence (Anatolii Mohyliov)
- Agrarian Party of Ukraine (Mykhailo Poplavskyi)
- Freedom (Oleh Tyahnybok)
- Movement of New Forces (Mikheil Saakashvili)

== Opinion polls ==
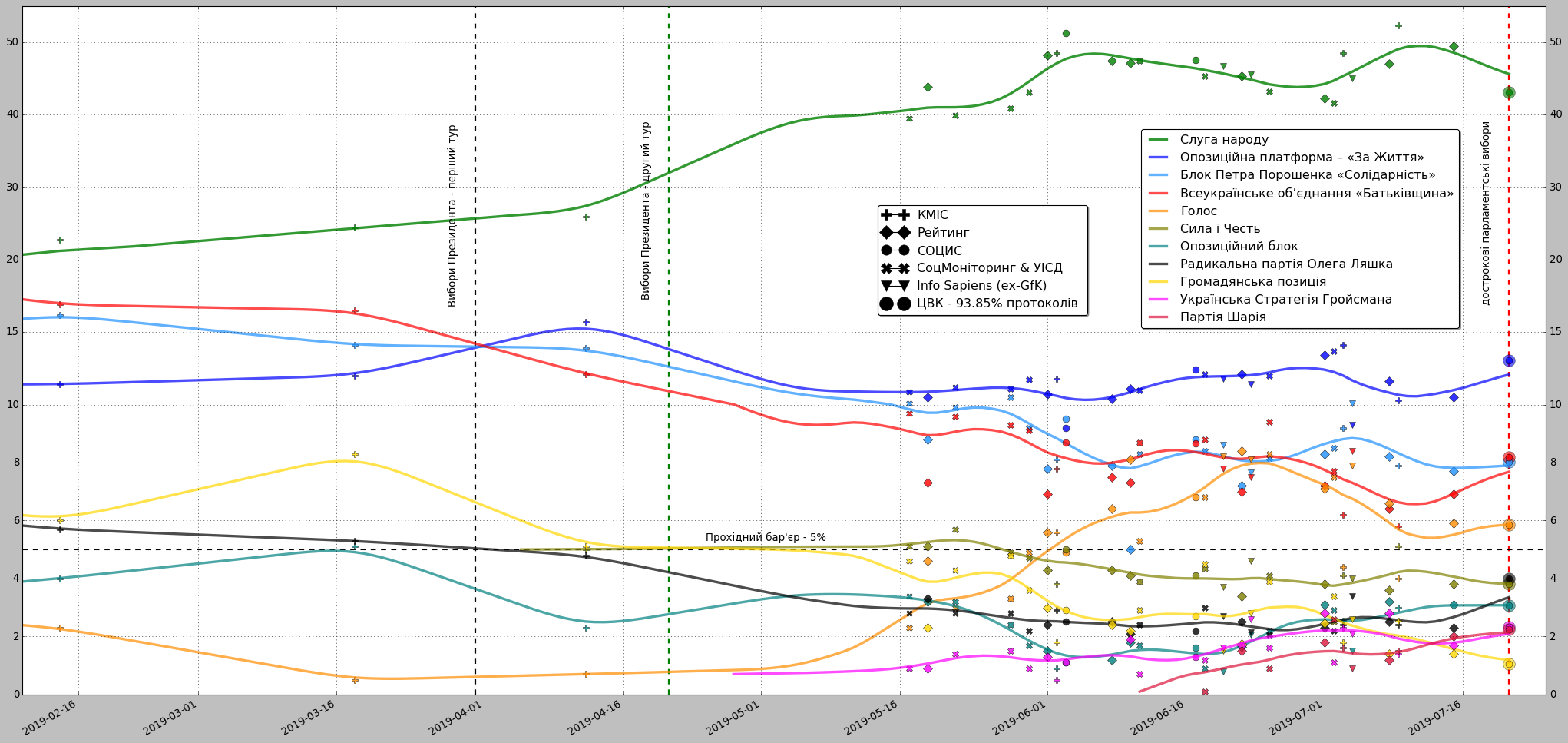
Opinion polls prior to the Ukrainian parliamentary election

== Results ==
Turnout in electoral districts

Turnout in regions

Results of party-list voting by electoral districts

Results of single-mandate constituencies

Party	Proportional			Constituency			Total seats	+/–
Party	Votes	%	Seats	Votes	%	Seats	Total seats	+/–
Servant of the People	6,307,793	43.16	124	4,630,880	32.87	130	254	New
Opposition Platform — For Life	1,908,111	13.06	37	987,832	7.01	6	43	New
Batkivshchyna	1,196,303	8.19	24	686,734	4.87	2	26	+6
European Solidarity	1,184,620	8.11	23	589,918	4.19	2	25	–106
Holos	851,722	5.83	17	401,903	2.85	3	20	New
Radical Party of Oleh Liashko	586,384	4.01	0	152,191	1.08	0	0	–22
Strength and Honor	558,652	3.82	0	175,397	1.24	0	0	0
Opposition Bloc — Party for Peace and Development	443,195	3.03	0	377,191	2.68	6	6	New
Ukrainian Strategy of Groysman	352,934	2.42	0				0	New
Party of Shariy	327,152	2.24	0	12,054	0.09	0	0	New
Svoboda	315,568	2.16	0	452,373	3.21	1	1	–6
Civil Position	153,225	1.05	0	103,044	0.73	0	0	0
Party of Greens of Ukraine	96,659	0.66	0				0	0
Self Reliance	91,596	0.63	0	135,297	0.96	1	1	–32
Agrarian Party of Ukraine	75,509	0.52	0	96,139	0.68	0	0	New
Movement of New Forces	67,740	0.46	0	7,683	0.05	0	0	New
Power of the People	27,984	0.19	0	49,117	0.35	0	0	0
Power of Law	20,340	0.14	0				0	New
Patriot	16,123	0.11	0	18,015	0.13	0	0	New
Social Justice	15,967	0.11	0	2,615	0.02	0	0	New
Independence	7,970	0.05	0				0	New
Torch	7,739	0.05	0				0	New
United Centre				44,485	0.32	1	1	New
People's Movement of Ukraine				41,482	0.29	0	0	0
Ukrainian Democratic Alliance for Reform				22,279	0.16	0	0	–
Bila Tserkva Together				20,277	0.14	1	1	New
Democratic Axis				13,613	0.10	0	0	New
Civil Movement of Ukraine				12,037	0.09	0	0	0
Joint Action				7,071	0.05	0	0	0
Ukrainian Unity Party				6,355	0.05	0	0	New
Congress of Ukrainian Nationalists				5,318	0.04	0	0	0
Right Sector				5,093	0.04	0	0	–1
Our Land				4,709	0.03	0	0	New
All-Ukrainian Union "Cherkashchany"				4,283	0.03	0	0	New
Social and Political Platform of Nadiya Savchenko				3,949	0.03	0	0	New
Party of Free Democrats				3,599	0.03	0	0	New
Ukrainian Party				3,268	0.02	0	0	New
Party of Pensioners of Ukraine				3,262	0.02	0	0	0
Ukraine the Glorious				3,064	0.02	0	0	0
Native City				2,376	0.02	0	0	0
Socialist Party of Ukraine				1,990	0.01	0	0	0
Liberty				1,802	0.01	0	0	0
Community and Law				1,527	0.01	0	0	New
Darth Vader Bloc				1,164	0.01	0	0	New
Development				903	0.01	0	0	New
Republican Christian Party				902	0.01	0	0	New
Aware Nation				766	0.01	0	0	New
Real Action				764	0.01	0	0	New
Party of Local Self-Governance				520	0.00	0	0	New
Meritocratic Party of Ukraine				517	0.00	0	0	0
Trust the Deeds				428	0.00	0	0	New
Gypsy Party of Ukraine				388	0.00	0	0	New
Internet Party of Ukraine				370	0.00	0	0	0
Bdzhola				222	0.00	0	0	New
People's Truth				206	0.00	0	0	New
Student Party of Ukraine				138	0.00	0	0	New
Pirate Party of Ukraine				133	0.00	0	0	New
Independents				4,992,514	35.43	46	46	–51
Vacant						26	26	–
Total	14,613,286	100.00	225	14,090,157	100.00	225	450	0
Valid votes	14,613,286	99.01						
Invalid/blank votes	146,262	0.99						
Total votes	14,759,548	100.00						
Registered voters/turnout	29,973,739	49.24						
Source: CLEA, CVK

The 46 independents included four members of Our Land, three members of UKROP, one member of Agrarian Party of Ukraine and one member of the For Specific Cases party, who had not been nominated by their parties.

=== Electoral support for parties ===
Servant of the People

Opposition Platform — For Life

Batkivshchyna

European Solidarity

Voice

=== Single-mandate constituency results ===
Winners in single-member constituencies
Region			District^{[District]}		Candidate	Votes %	Party
No.	Name	No. of mandates	Geographical reference and name	No.	Candidate	Votes %	Party
1	AR Crimea	10	South-East Simferopol-Tsentralny	001	—	—	—
1	AR Crimea	10	South-East Simferopol-Kyivsky	002	—	—	—
1	AR Crimea	10	South-East Dzhankoi	003	—	—	—
1	AR Crimea	10	South-East Yevpatoriia	004	—	—	—
1	AR Crimea	10	South-East Kerch	005	—	—	—
1	AR Crimea	10	South-East Feodosiia	006	—	—	—
1	AR Crimea	10	South-East Yalta	007	—	—	—
1	AR Crimea	10	South-East Sudak	008	—	—	—
1	AR Crimea	10	South-East Krasnoperekopsk	009	—	—	—
1	AR Crimea	10	South-East Bakhchysarai	010	—	—	—
2	Vinnytsia	8	Central Vinnytsia (Vyshenka)	011	Maksym Pashkovskyi		Servant of the People
2	Vinnytsia	8	Central Vinnytsia (Zamosttia)	012	Anatoliy Drabovskyi		Servant of the People
2	Vinnytsia	8	Central Kalynivka	013	Petro Yurchyshyn		Independent
2	Vinnytsia	8	Central Zhmerynka	014	Iryna Borzova		Servant of the People
2	Vinnytsia	8	Central Sharhorod	015	Larysa Bilozir		Independent
2	Vinnytsia	8	Central Yampil	016	Hennadiy Vatsak		Independent
2	Vinnytsia	8	Central Ladyzhyn	017	Mykola Kucher		Independent
2	Vinnytsia	8	Central Illintsi	018	Oleh Meidych		Fatherland
3	Volyn	5	West Volodymyr-Volynskyi	019	Ihor Huz		Independent
3	Volyn	5	West Horokhiv	020	Vyacheslav Rublyov		Servant of the People
3	Volyn	5	West Kovel	021	Stepan Ivakhiv		Independent
3	Volyn	5	West Lutsk	022	Ihor Palytsia		Independent
3	Volyn	5	West Manevychi	023	Iryna Kostankevych		Independent
4	Dnipropetrovsk	17	South-East Dnipro-Industrialnyi	024	Dmytro Kysylevskyi		Servant of the People
4	Dnipropetrovsk	17	South-East Dnipro-Chechelivsk	025	Maksym Buzhanskyi		Servant of the People
4	Dnipropetrovsk	17	South-East Dnipro-Shevchenkivskyi	026	Kyrylo Nesterenko		Servant of the People
4	Dnipropetrovsk	17	South-East Dnipro-Sobornyi	027	Vyacheslav Medyanyk		Servant of the People
4	Dnipropetrovsk	17	South-East Dnipro-Novokodatskyi	028	Yuriy Mysyahin		Servant of the People
4	Dnipropetrovsk	17	South-East Dnipro (Yuvileine)	029	Serhiy Demchenko		Servant of the People
4	Dnipropetrovsk	17	South-East Kamianske	030	Hanna Lichman		Servant of the People
4	Dnipropetrovsk	17	South-East Kryvyi Rih-Ternivsky	031	Volodymyr Zakharchenko		Servant of the People
4	Dnipropetrovsk	17	South-East Kryvyi Rih-Dovhynetsky	032	Elena Krivoruchkina		Servant of the People
4	Dnipropetrovsk	17	South-East Kryvyi Rih-Tsentralnomisky	033	Yuriy Koryavchenkov		Servant of the People
4	Dnipropetrovsk	17	South-East Tsarychanka	034	Dmytro Chornyi		Servant of the People
4	Dnipropetrovsk	17	South-East Nikopol	035	Denys Herman		Servant of the People
4	Dnipropetrovsk	17	South-East Pavlohrad	036	Roman Kaptyelov		Servant of the People
4	Dnipropetrovsk	17	South-East Kryvyi Rih	037	Dmytro Shpenov		Independent
4	Dnipropetrovsk	17	South-East Novomoskovsk	038	Vladyslav Borodin		Servant of the People
4	Dnipropetrovsk	17	South-East Vasylkivka	039	Serhiy Severyn		Servant of the People
4	Dnipropetrovsk	17	South-East Marhanets	040	Oleksandr Trukhin		Servant of the People
5	Donetsk	21	South-East Donetsk-Budyonnivsky	041	—	—	—
5	Donetsk	21	South-East Donetsk-Voroshilovsky	042	—	—	—
5	Donetsk	21	South-East Donetsk-Lyeninsky	043	—	—	—
5	Donetsk	21	South-East Donetsk-Kirovsky	044	—	—	—
5	Donetsk	21	South-East Donetsk-Kyivsky	045	Musa Magomedov		Opposition Bloc
5	Donetsk	21	South-East Bakhmut	046	Fyodor Khristenko		Opposition Platform — For Life
5	Donetsk	21	South-East Sloviansk	047	Yuriy Solod		Opposition Platform — For Life
5	Donetsk	21	South-East Kramatorsk	048	Maksym Yefimov		Independent
5	Donetsk	21	South-East Kostiantynivka	049	Valeriy Gnatenko		Opposition Platform — For Life
5	Donetsk	21	South-East Pokrovsk	050	Ruslav Trebushkin		Opposition Bloc
5	Donetsk	21	South-East Horlivka	051	Oleksandr Kovalyov	—	Independent
5	Donetsk	21	South-East Toretsk	052	Yevhen Yakovenko		Fatherland
5	Donetsk	21	South-East Yenakiieve	053	—	—	—
5	Donetsk	21	South-East Shakhtarsk	054	—	—	—
5	Donetsk	21	South-East Makiivka-Hirnytsky	055	—	—	—
5	Donetsk	21	South-East Makiivka-Tsentralnomisky	056	—	—	—
5	Donetsk	21	South-East Mariupol-Kalmiuskyi	057	Vadim Novinskiy		Opposition Bloc
5	Donetsk	21	South-East Mariupol-Tsentralnyi	058	Sergei Magera		Opposition Bloc
5	Donetsk	21	South-East Marinka	059	Volodymyr Moroz		Opposition Platform — For Life
5	Donetsk	21	South-East Volnovakha	060	Dmytro Lubinets		Independent
5	Donetsk	21	South-East Starobesheve	061	—	—	—
6	Zhytomyr	6	Central Zhytomyr	062	Ihor Herasymenko		Servant of the People
6	Zhytomyr	6	Central Berdychiv	063	Bohdan Kytsak		Servant of the People
6	Zhytomyr	6	Central Korosten	064	Volodymyr Areshonkov		Independent
6	Zhytomyr	6	Central Novohrad-Volynskyi	065	Dmytro Kostiuk		Servant of the People
6	Zhytomyr	6	Central Malyn	066	Tetiana Hryshchenko		Servant of the People
6	Zhytomyr	6	Central Chudniv	067	Serhiy Kuzminykh		Servant of the People
7	Zakarpattia	6	West Uzhhorod	068	Robert Horvat		Independent
7	Zakarpattia	6	West Mukacheve	069	Viktor Baloha		United Centre
7	Zakarpattia	6	West Svaliava	070	Mykhailo Laba		Servant of the People
7	Zakarpattia	6	West Khust	071	Valeriy Lunchenko		Independent
7	Zakarpattia	6	West Tiachiv	072	Vasyl Petyovka		Independent
7	Zakarpattia	6	West Vynohradiv	073	Vladislav Poliak		Independent
8	Zaporizhzhia	9	South-East Zaporizhzhia-Komunarskyi	074	Hennadiy Kasai		Servant of the People
8	Zaporizhzhia	9	South-East Zaporizhzhia-Dniprovskyi	075	Roman Sokha		Servant of the People
8	Zaporizhzhia	9	South-East Zaporizhzhia-Voznesenivskyi	076	Yevgeniy Shevchenko		Servant of the People
8	Zaporizhzhia	9	South-East Zaporizhzhia-Shevchenkivsky	077	Serhiy Shtepa		Servant of the People
8	Zaporizhzhia	9	South-East Berdiansk	078	Oleksandr Ponomariov	48.51	Opposition Platform – For Life
8	Zaporizhzhia	9	South-East Vasylivka	079	Yulia Yatsyk		Servant of the People
8	Zaporizhzhia	9	South-East Melitopol	080	Serhiy Minko	47.40	Independent
8	Zaporizhzhia	9	South-East Tokmak	081	Pavlo Melnyk		Servant of the People
8	Zaporizhzhia	9	South-East Polohy	082	Maryna Nikitina		Servant of the People
9	Ivano-Frankivsk	7	West Ivano-Frankivsk	083	Oksana Savchuk		Freedom
9	Ivano-Frankivsk	7	West Tysmenytsia	084	Ihor Fris		Servant of the People
9	Ivano-Frankivsk	7	West Kalush	085	Eduard Proshchuk		Servant of the People
9	Ivano-Frankivsk	7	West Dolyna	086	Oleksandr Matusevych		Servant of the People
9	Ivano-Frankivsk	7	West Nadvirna	087	Zinoviy Andriyovych		Servant of the People
9	Ivano-Frankivsk	7	West Kolomyia	088	Andriy Ivanchuk		Independent
9	Ivano-Frankivsk	7	West Sniatyn	089	Volodymyr Tymofiychuk		Servant of the People
10	Kyiv Oblast	9	Central Bila Tserkva	090	Mykola Babenko		Bila Tserkva United
10	Kyiv Oblast	9	Central Makariv	091	Oleh Dunda		Servant of the People
10	Kyiv Oblast	9	Central Uzyn	092	Valeriy Koliukh		Servant of the People
10	Kyiv Oblast	9	Central Myronivka	093	Anna Skorokhod		Servant of the People
10	Kyiv Oblast	9	Central Obukhiv	094	Oleksandr Dubinsky		Servant of the People
10	Kyiv Oblast	9	Central Irpin	095	Oleksandr Horobets		Servant of the People
10	Kyiv Oblast	9	Central Vyshhorod	096	Olha Vasylevska-Smahliuk		Servant of the People
10	Kyiv Oblast	9	Central Brovary	097	Mykola Halushko		Servant of the People
10	Kyiv Oblast	9	Central Yahotyn	098	Serhiy Bunin		Servant of the People
11	Kirovohrad	5	Central Kropyvnytskyi	099	Oleksandr Danutsa		Servant of the People
11	Kirovohrad	5	Central Bobrynets	100	Ihor Murdiy		Servant of the People
11	Kirovohrad	5	Central Holovanivsk	101	Yuriy Kuzbyt		Servant of the People
11	Kirovohrad	5	Central Znamianka	102	Oles Dovhyi		Independent
11	Kirovohrad	5	Central Oleksandriia	103	Oleh Voronko		Servant of the People
12	Luhansk	11	South-East Luhansk-Artemivsky	104	—	—	—
12	Luhansk	11	South-East Luhansk-Zhovtnevy	105	Viktoria Grib		Opposition Bloc
12	Luhansk	11	South-East Severodonetsk	106	Oleksiy Kuznyetsov		Servant of the People
12	Luhansk	11	South-East Lysychansk	107	Oleksandr Sukhov		Independent
12	Luhansk	11	South-East Krasnyi Luch	108	—	—	—
12	Luhansk	11	South-East Krasnodon	109	—	—	—
12	Luhansk	11	South-East Alchevsk	110	—	—	—
12	Luhansk	11	South-East Sverdlovsk	111	—	—	—
12	Luhansk	11	South-East Rubizhne	112	Serhiy Velmozhnyi		Independent
12	Luhansk	11	South-East Svatove	113	Aleksandr Lukashev		Opposition Platform – For Life
12	Luhansk	11	South-East Stanytsia Luhanska	114	Serhiy Shakhov		Independent
13	Lviv	12	West Lviv-Sykhivsky	115	Natalia Pipa		Holos
13	Lviv	12	West Lviv-Zaliznychny	116	Mykola Kniazhytskyi		European Solidarity
13	Lviv	12	West Lviv-Frankivsky	117	Yaroslav Rushchyshyn		Holos
13	Lviv	12	West Lviv-Lychakivsky	118	Halyna Vasylchenko		Holos
13	Lviv	12	West Brody	119	Mykhailo Bondar		European Solidarity
13	Lviv	12	West Horodok	120	Yaroslav Dubnevych		Independent
13	Lviv	12	West Drohobych	121	Orest Salamakha		Servant of the People
13	Lviv	12	West Yavoriv	122	Pavlo Bakunets		Self Reliance
13	Lviv	12	West Peremyshliany	123	Taras Batenko		Independent
13	Lviv	12	West Sokal	124	Yuriy Kamelchuk		Servant of the People
13	Lviv	12	West Staryi Sambir	125	Andriy Lopushanskyi		Independent
13	Lviv	12	West Stryy	126	Andriy Kit		Independent
14	Mykolaiv	6	South-East Mykolaiv-Zavodsky	127	Oleksandr Pasichnyi		Servant of the People
14	Mykolaiv	6	South-East Mykolaiv-Inhulskyi	128	Oleksandr Haidu		Servant of the People
14	Mykolaiv	6	South-East Mykolaiv-Tsentralny	129	Ihor Kopytin		Servant of the People
14	Mykolaiv	6	South-East Bashtanka	130	Ihor Nehulevskyi		Servant of the People
14	Mykolaiv	6	South-East Voznesensk	131	Artem Chornomorov		Servant of the People
14	Mykolaiv	6	South-East Pervomaisk	132	Maksym Dyrdin		Servant of the People
15	Odesa	11	South-East Odesa-Kyivsky	133	Artem Dmytruk		Servant of the People
15	Odesa	11	South-East Odesa-Malynovsky	134	Oleh Koliev		Servant of the People
15	Odesa	11	South-East Odesa-Prymorsky	135	Oleksiy Leonov		Servant of the People
15	Odesa	11	South-East Odesa-Suvorovsky	136	Oleksandr Horeniuk		Servant of the People
15	Odesa	11	South-East Podilsk	137	Oleksiy Honcharenko		Independent
15	Odesa	11	South-East Shyriaieve	138	Stepan Cherniavskyi		Servant of the People
15	Odesa	11	South-East Rozdilna	139	Ihor Vasylkovskyi		Servant of the People
15	Odesa	11	South-East Biliaivka	140	Serhiy Koleboshyn		Servant of the People
15	Odesa	11	South-East Tatarbunary	141	Oleksandr Tkachenko (uk)		Servant of the People
15	Odesa	11	South-East Artsyz	142	Anton Kisse		Independent
15	Odesa	11	South-East Izmail	143	Anatoliy Urbanskyi		Independent
16	Poltava	8	Central Poltava-Shevchenkivskyi	144	Dmytro Naliotov		Servant of the People
16	Poltava	8	Central Poltava-Kyivsky	145	Andriy Bobliakh		Servant of the People
16	Poltava	8	Central Kremenchuk	146	Yuriy Shapovalov		Independent
16	Poltava	8	Central Myrhorod	147	Oleh Kulinich		Independent
16	Poltava	8	Central Lubny	148	Anastasia Liasheno		Servant of the People
16	Poltava	8	Central Karlivka	149	Kostiantyn Kasai		Servant of the People
16	Poltava	8	Central Horishni Plavni	150	Oleksiy Movchan		Servant of the People
16	Poltava	8	Central Lokhvytsia	151	Maksym Berezin		Servant of the People
17	Rivne	5	West Rivne	152	Oleksandr Kovalchuk		Servant of the People
17	Rivne	5	West Ostroh	153	Roman Ivanisov		Servant of the People
17	Rivne	5	West Dubno	154	Oleksandr Aliksiychuk		Servant of the People
17	Rivne	5	West Dubrovytsia	155	Viktor Mialyk		Independent
17	Rivne	5	West Sarny	156	Serhiy Lytvynenko		Servant of the People
18	Sumy	6	Central Sumy	157	Tetiana Riabukha		Servant of the People
18	Sumy	6	Central Bilopillia	158	Ihor Vasyliev		Servant of the People
18	Sumy	6	Central Hlukhiv	159	Andriy Derkach		Independent
18	Sumy	6	Central Shostka	160	Ihor Molotok		Independent
18	Sumy	6	Central Romny	161	Maksym Huzenko		Servant of the People
18	Sumy	6	Central Okhtyrka	162	Mykola Zadorozhnii		Servant of the People
19	Ternopil	5	West Ternopil	163	Andriy Bohdanets		Servant of the People
19	Ternopil	5	West Zbarazh	164	Ihor Vasyliv		Servant of the People
19	Ternopil	5	West Zboriv	165	Ivan Chaikivskyi		Independent
19	Ternopil	5	West Terebovlya	166	Mykola Liushniak		Independent
19	Ternopil	5	West Chortkiv	167	Volodymyr Hevko		Servant of the People
20	Kharkiv	14	South-East Kharkiv-Shevchenkivskyi	168	Maria Mezentseva		Servant of the People
20	Kharkiv	14	South-East Kharkiv-Kyivsky	169	Oleksandr Kunytskyi		Servant of the People
20	Kharkiv	14	South-East Kharkiv-Moskovsky	170	Andriy Odarchenko		Servant of the People
20	Kharkiv	14	South-East Kharkiv-Nemyshlyanskyi	171	Viktoria Kinzburska		Servant of the People
20	Kharkiv	14	South-East Kharkiv-Industrialnyi	172	Yuriy Zdebskyi		Servant of the People
20	Kharkiv	14	South-East Kharkiv-Slobidskyi	173	Oleksandr Bakumov		Servant of the People
20	Kharkiv	14	South-East Kharkiv-Kholodnohirskyi	174	Oleksandr Feldman		Independent
20	Kharkiv	14	South-East Derhachi	175	Yevhen Pyvovarov		Servant of the People
20	Kharkiv	14	South-East Chuhuiv	176	Dmitriy Shentsev		Opposition Block
20	Kharkiv	14	South-East Kupiansk	177	Dmytro Liubota		Servant of the People
20	Kharkiv	14	South-East Balakliia	178	Oleksandr Litvinov		Servant of the People
20	Kharkiv	14	South-East Krasnohrad	179	Oleksiy Kucher/ Yuliya Svitlychna (15 March 2020 by-election)	77.54% (Svitlychna)	Servant of the People/ Independent (Svitlychna)
20	Kharkiv	14	South-East Zolochiv	180	Oleksiy Krasov		Servant of the People
20	Kharkiv	14	South-East Zmiiv	181	Dmytro Mykysha		Servant of the People
21	Kherson	5	South-East Kherson-Suvorovsky	182	Pavlo Pavlish		Servant of the People
21	Kherson	5	South-East Kherson-Korabelnyi	183	Viktoria Vahnier		Servant of the People
21	Kherson	5	South-East Nova Kakhovka	184	Viktor Kolykhayev		Independent
21	Kherson	5	South-East Kakhovka	185	Volodymyr Ivanov (uk)		Servant of the People
21	Kherson	5	South-East Oleshky	186	Oleksiy Kovaliov		Servant of the People
22	Khmelnytskyi	7	Central Khmelnytskyi	187	Mykola Stefanchuk		Servant of the People
22	Khmelnytskyi	7	Central Khmelnytskyi (and vicinity)	188	Serhiy Labaziuk		Independent
22	Khmelnytskyi	7	Central Krasyliv	189	Olena Kopanchuk		Servant of the People
22	Khmelnytskyi	7	Central Shepetivka	190	Oleksii Zhmerenetskyi		Servant of the People
22	Khmelnytskyi	7	Central Starokostiantyniv	191	Viktor Bondar		Independent
22	Khmelnytskyi	7	Central Dunaivtsi	192	Oleksandr Hereha		Independent
22	Khmelnytskyi	7	Central Kamianets-Podilskyi	193	Ihor Marchuk		Servant of the People
23	Cherkasy	7	Central Cherkasy-Prydniprovsky	194	Liubov Shpak		Servant of the People
23	Cherkasy	7	Central Cherkasy-Sosnivsky	195	Oleh Arseniuk		Servant of the People
23	Cherkasy	7	Central Korsun-Shevchenkivskyi	196	Andriy Strikharskyi		Servant of the People
23	Cherkasy	7	Central Kaniv	197	Oleksandr Skichko		Servant of the People
23	Cherkasy	7	Central Smila	198	Serhiy Rudyk		Independent
23	Cherkasy	7	Central Zhashkiv	199	Serhiy Nahorniak (uk)		Servant of the People
23	Cherkasy	7	Central Uman	200	Anton Yatsenko		Independent
24	Chernivtsi	4	West Chernivtsi	201	Olena Lys		Servant of the People
24	Chernivtsi	4	West Storozhynets	202	Maksym Zaremskyi		Servant of the People
24	Chernivtsi	4	West Novoselytsia	203	Heorhiy Mazurashu		Servant of the People
24	Chernivtsi	4	West Khotyn	204	Valeriy Bozhyk		Servant of the People
25	Chernihiv	6	Central Chernihiv-Desnyansky	205	Oleh Seminskyi		Servant of the People
25	Chernihiv	6	Central Chernihiv-Novozavodsky	206	Anton Poliakov		Servant of the People
25	Chernihiv	6	Central Koriukivka	207	Maksym Zuyev		Servant of the People
25	Chernihiv	6	Central Bakhmach	208	Valeriy Davydenko		Independent
25	Chernihiv	6	Central Nizhyn	209	Valeriy Zub		Servant of the People
25	Chernihiv	6	Central Pryluky	210	Serhiy Korovchenko		Independent
26	Kyiv City	13	Central Kyiv-Holosiyivsky	211	Oleksandr Yurchenko		Servant of the People
26	Kyiv City	13	Central Kyiv-Darnytsky	212	Maksym Perebyinis		Servant of the People
26	Kyiv City	13	Central Kyiv-Desnyansky	213	Artem Dubnov		Servant of the People
26	Kyiv City	13	Central Kyiv-Dniprovsky	214	Serhiy Shvets		Servant of the People
26	Kyiv City	13	Central Kyiv-Desnyansky (minor Dniprovsky)	215	Bohdan Yaremenko		Servant of the People
26	Kyiv City	13	Central Kyiv-Dniprovsky (minor Darnytsky)	216	Lesia Zaburanna		Servant of the People
26	Kyiv City	13	Central Kyiv-Obolonsky	217	Maryana Bezuhla		Servant of the People
26	Kyiv City	13	Central Kyiv-Svyatoshynsky (minor Obolonsky)	218	Dmytro Hurin		Servant of the People
26	Kyiv City	13	Central Kyiv-Svyatoshynsky	219	Mykola Tyshchenko		Servant of the People
26	Kyiv City	13	Central Kyiv-Podilsky	220	Hanna Bondar		Servant of the People
26	Kyiv City	13	Central Kyiv-Pechersky	221	Anna Purtova		Servant of the People
26	Kyiv City	13	Central Kyiv-Solomyansky	222	Roman Hryshchuk		Servant of the People
26	Kyiv City	13	Central Kyiv-Shevchenkivsky	223	Liudmila Buymister		Servant of the People
27	Sevastopol	2	South-East Sevastopol-Gagarinsky	224	—	—	—
27	Sevastopol	2	South-East Sevastopol-Leninsky	225	—	—	—
Notes: District. Electoral districts are not part of the administrative territorial system and may include several territorial units of the Ukrainian regions (raions, cities of regional significance, and others).

About 80 percent of the elected candidates had never been elected to parliament; 83 deputies managed to get reelected from the previous parliament and 13 deputies from earlier convocations. All deputies from Servant of the People were political newcomers. 61 percent of the new MPs had never before been engaged in politics.
