= Vasylyev =

Vasylyev or Vasylyeva is a surname. Notable people with the surname include:

- Ihor Serhiyovych Vasylyev (born 1985), Ukrainian politician
- Maksym Vasylyev (born 1990), Ukrainian cyclist
- Oleksandr Vasylyev (born 1994), Ukrainian footballer
- Valeriy Vasylyev (born 1976) Ukrainian long jumper
- Anastasiya Vasylyeva (born 1992), Ukrainian tennis player
