= Viktoria Kinzburska =

Ukrainian politician

- Вікторія Кінзбурська
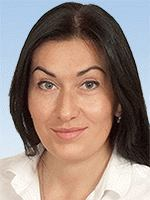
- Official portrait, 2019

People's Deputy of Ukraine
- Incumbent
- Assumed office 29 August 2019
- Preceded by: Vitaliy Khomutynnik
- Constituency: Kharkiv Oblast, No. 171

Personal details
- Born: 23 October 1980 (age 45) Kharkiv, Ukrainian SSR, Soviet Union (now Ukraine)
- Party: Servant of the People
- Other political affiliations: Independent
- Education: Yaroslav Mudryi National Law University

Viktoria Oleksandrivna Kinzburska (Ukrainian: Вікторія Олександрівна Кінзбурська; born 23 October 1980) is a Ukrainian politician currently serving as a People's Deputy of Ukraine from Ukraine's 171st electoral district since 29 August 2019. She is a member of Servant of the People.

== Early life and career ==
Viktoria Oleksandrivna Kinzburska was born on 23 October 1980 in the city of Kharkiv in eastern Ukraine. She is a graduate of the Yaroslav Mudryi National Law University, and in 2008 she became a certified lawyer.

Before being elected, Kinzburska worked as head of the finance department of the Kontur company. Prior to 2017, Kinzburska was chief legal adviser to the legal team of the Kharkiv City Council's Department of Territorial Control. Afterwards, she worked in the Department of Social Protection of Kharkiv Oblast for a short time before moving to the Department of Architecture and Building Inspection of Kharkiv Oblast, where she was head of the department's legal team until her election.

== Political career ==
Kinzburska was the candidate of Servant of the People in Ukraine's 171st electoral district during the 2019 Ukrainian parliamentary election. At the time of the election she was an independent. She was ultimately successfully elected, defeating the next-closest candidate, Andriy Lesyk of Opposition Platform — For Life, with 38.01% of the vote to Lesyk's 26.95%.

In the Verkhovna Rada (Ukraine's parliament), Kinzburska joined the Servant of the People faction. She also joined the Verkhovna Rada Committee on Finance, Taxes, and Customs Policy.

Kinzburska was one of the Servant of the People deputies involved in an October 2019 corruption scandal. She was accused by party leadership of accepting bribes of US$30,000 to vote against measures which would have prevented online intermediary services for property appraisers, linked to independent People's Deputy Anton Yatsenko, from making billions of hryvnias in profits from the purchase and sale of property.
