= Bohdan Kytsak =

Ukrainian teacher and politician

- Богдан Кицак
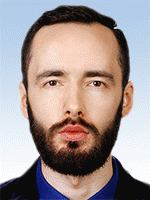
- Official portrait, 2019

People's Deputy of Ukraine
- Incumbent
- Assumed office 29 August 2019
- Preceded by: Oleksandr Reveha
- Constituency: Zhytomyr Oblast, No. 63

Personal details
- Born: 2 June 1992 (age 34) Berdychiv, Ukraine
- Party: Servant of the People
- Other political affiliations: Independent
- Education: Taras Shevchenko National University of Kyiv

Bohdan Viktorovych Kytsak (Ukrainian: Богдан Вікторович Кицак; born 2 June 1992) is a Ukrainian teacher and politician currently serving as a People's Deputy of Ukraine from Ukraine's 63rd electoral district since 29 August 2019. He is a member of Servant of the People.

== Early life and career ==
Bohdan Viktorovych Kytsak was born on 2 June 1992 in Berdychiv, in Ukraine's Zhytomyr Oblast. His mother is Tamara Babiychuk, a teacher recognised by the Ukrainian government for her skills as an educator. After graduating from secondary school with honours in 2009, he graduated from Taras Shevchenko National University of Kyiv in 2014 with a specialisation in history. He achieved his doctorate in historical sciences in 2018, with the subject of "Medical Provisions of the population of Reichskommissariat Ukraine, 1941–1944".

Following his graduation from Kyiv University, Kytsak followed the path of his mother, working as a history teacher at the Berdychiv Pedagogical College where she worked as a teacher of the Ukrainian language.

== Political career ==
Kytsak entered politics in 2016, becoming a member of the Berdychiv City Council. In 2018, he founded the Berdychiv Development Centre.

=== People's Deputy of Ukraine ===
Kytsak ran in the 2019 Ukrainian parliamentary election as the candidate of Servant of the People in Ukraine's 63rd electoral district, including the city of Berdychiv and surrounding areas. At the time of his election, he was an independent. Kytsak was successfully elected, defeating incumbent Oleksandr Reveha with 43.23% of the vote to Reveha's 17.04%.

Kytsak is a member of the Servant of the People faction in the Verkhovna Rada (Ukraine's parliament), as well as the Verkhovna Rada Committee on Economic Development.

Kytsak was one of the signatories of a 2020 letter by People's Deputies from Servant of the People urging President of Ukraine Volodymyr Zelenskyy against accepting a proposal from the Trilateral Contact Group on Ukraine which would have brought Ukrainian separatists into the government in an effort to end the war in Donbas.
