= Dmytro Mykysha =

Ukrainian politician

- Дмитро Микиша
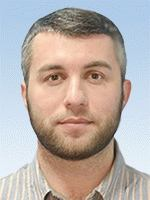
- Official portrait, 2019

People's Deputy of Ukraine
- Incumbent
- Assumed office 29 August 2019
- Preceded by: Yevhen Murayev
- Constituency: Kharkiv Oblast, No. 181

Personal details
- Born: 4 March 1985 (age 41) Merefa, Ukrainian SSR, Soviet Union (now Ukraine)
- Party: Servant of the People
- Other political affiliations: Independent
- Education: Ukrainian State University of Rail Transport; Kharkiv Rail Transport Technical College

Dmytro Serhiyovych Mykysha (Ukrainian: Дмитро Сергійович Микиша; born 4 March 1985) is a Ukrainian politician currently serving as a People's Deputy of Ukraine from Ukraine's 181st electoral district since 29 August 2019. He is a member of Servant of the People.

== Early life and career ==
Dmytro Serhiyovych Mykysha was born on 4 March 1985 in the city of Merefa, in Ukraine's eastern Kharkiv Oblast. He is a graduate of the Ukrainian State University of Rail Transport (specialising in transportation organisation and management) and the Kharkiv Rail Transport Technical College (specialising in international transportation organisation). From 2009 to 2015 he worked at the Kharkiv Directive of Southern Railways as an officer at railway stations.

Mykysha is currently studying at the National Academy for Public Administration for public administration since 2017. Since 2016, he has been a member of the board of directors of the non-governmental organisation "Agency for Development and Investment".

== Political career ==
From 2015 until the time of his election, Mykysha was deputy mayor of Merefa for functions of the city's executive bodies.

Mykysha ran in the 2019 Ukrainian parliamentary election as the candidate of Servant of the People for People's Deputy of Ukraine in Ukraine's 181st electoral district. He was successfully elected, defeating runner-up Valeria Murayeva (an independent) with 38.05% of the vote to Murayeva's 23.01%. At the time of the election, Mykysha was himself an independent. In the Verkhovna Rada (Ukraine's parliament), Mykysha joined the Servant of the People faction and the Verkhovna Rada Committee on Organising State Power, Local Self-Government, Regional Development, and Urban Planning.

In 2019, according to a report by anti-corruption non-governmental organisation Chesno, Mykysha voted against bills more than any other People's Deputy within the Servant of the People faction. According to informational portal Slovo i Dilo, as of 15 March 2021 Mykysha had fulfilled 22% of his 32 electoral promises, with the only promise that failed outright being a promise to attend all meetings of the Verkhovna Rada. Among his fulfilled promises included support for raising defence spending to 5% of Ukraine's gross domestic product, an independent audit of Ukraine's highway system, and to reduce the level of corruption in the office of Prosecutor General of Ukraine.

On 8 November 2021, Mykysha joined former Chairman of the Verkhovna Rada Dmytro Razumkov and 23 other People's Deputies in forming the Smart Politics political party. Despite this, however, he has not left the Servant of the People faction in the Verkhovna Rada.
