= Andriy Bobliakh =

Ukrainian comedian and politician

- Андрій Боблях
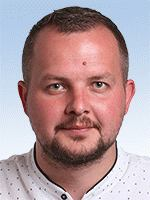
- Official portrait, 2019

People's Deputy of Ukraine
- Incumbent
- Assumed office 29 August 2019
- Preceded by: Yuriy Bublyk
- Constituency: Poltava Oblast, No. 145

Personal details
- Born: 5 March 1985 (age 41) Karmėlava, Lithuanian SSR, Soviet Union (now Lithuania)
- Party: Servant of the People
- Other political affiliations: Independent; Socialist Party of Ukraine
- Education: Rivne State Humanitarian University

Andriy Rostyslavovych Bobliakh (Ukrainian: Андрій Ростиславович Боблях; born 5 March 1985) is a Ukrainian entertainer, politician, and volunteer, and a member of the 9th convocation of the Verkhovna Rada. Commander of the 3rd Mobile Fire Group of the “Volyn” Operational Battalion of the Ukrainian Volunteer Army. Chairman of the Subcommittee on Humanitarian Development in the Context of Decentralization of the Verkhovna Rada Committee on Humanitarian and Information Policy

== Early life and career ==
Andriy Rostyslavovych Bobliakh was born on 5 March 1985 in the town of Karmėlava, in Lithuania. In 1987, his family moved to the village of Zoria, in Ukraine's western Rivne Oblast. He is a graduate of the Rivne State Humanitarian University, specialising in applied mathematics.

In 2013, Bobliakh moved to Poltava. Here, he became a comedian, participating in multiple television shows and founding the Manhattan Kids comedy club, as well as the Poltava Student Comedy Club, Poltava School Comedy Club, and Doubleyou studio, the latter of which was a merger of the Manhattan and SMT comedy studios.

== Political career ==
In the 2012 Ukrainian parliamentary election, Bobliakh was an unsuccessful candidate for People's Deputy of Ukraine, placed 149th on the party list of the Socialist Party of Ukraine.

Bobliakh was a Servant of the People candidate for People's Deputy of Ukraine in the 2019 Ukrainian parliamentary election, contesting the election in Ukraine's 145th electoral district. At the time of the election, he was an independent. This time, he was successfully elected, defeating incumbent Yuriy Bublyk (running as an independent, formerly a member of Svoboda) with 49.16% of the vote. Bublyk, by comparison, garnered only 9.86% of the vote.

In the Verkhovna Rada (Ukraine's national parliament), Bobliakh joined the Servant of the People faction, the Verkhovna Rada Committee on Humanitarian and Informational Policy, and the inter-factional association Blockchain4Ukraine. Since July 2020, he has also been chairman of the Poltava regional committee of Servant of the People.
