= Roman Sokha =

Ukrainian politician

- Роман Соха
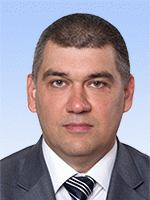
- Official portrait, 2019

People's Deputy of Ukraine
- Incumbent
- Assumed office 29 August 2019
- Preceded by: Ihor Artiushenko
- Constituency: Zaporizhzhia Oblast, No. 75

Personal details
- Born: 18 October 1975 (age 50) Zaporizhzhia, Ukrainian SSR, Soviet Union (now Ukraine)
- Party: Servant of the People
- Education: Zaporizhzhia Polytechnic National University

Roman Vasylovych Sokha (Ukrainian: Роман Васильович Соха; born 18 October 1975) is a Ukrainian politician currently serving as a People's Deputy of Ukraine representing Ukraine's 75th electoral district as a member of Servant of the People since 2019.

== Early life and career ==
Roman Vasylovych Sokha was born on 18 October 1975 in the city of Zaporizhzhia, in southern Ukraine. He is a graduate of the Zaporizhzhia Polytechnic National University, specialising in finance. Prior to his election, he worked in the management of multiple finance institutions. He was also director of the Svedbank regional bank, the Zaporizhzhia branch of Ukrinbank, and the Everest advertising agency.

== Political career ==
Before being elected, Sokha worked as an assistant to Iryna Suslova, a People's Deputy of Ukraine in the 8th Ukrainian Verkhovna Rada (parliament) from Self Reliance. In the 2019 Ukrainian presidential election, he was head of the campaign office of Volodymyr Zelenskyy in Zaporizhzhia.

In the 2019 Ukrainian parliamentary election, Sokha was the candidate of Servant of the People for People's Deputy of Ukraine in Ukraine's 75th electoral district. He won the election with 43.74% of the vote, defeating former People's Deputy from the 75th district Serhiy Kaltsev (Opposition Platform — For Life), who gathered 12.43% of the vote.

In the Verkhovna Rada, Sokha joined the Servant of the People faction. He also joined Blockchain4Ukraine inter-factional association and the Verkhovna Rada Committee on Digital Transformation. He has opposed the formation of a body including Russian separatist officials (as recommended by the Trilateral Contact Group on Ukraine) and supported the removal of Arsen Avakov, signing an open letter in opposition to the former and a resolution in favour of the latter. On 5 October 2022, he left the Committee on Digital Transformation to join the Verkhovna Rada Environmental Committee.
