= Tetiana Hryshchenko =

Ukrainian politician

- Тетяна Грищенко
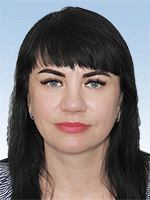
- Official portrait, 2019

People's Deputy of Ukraine
- Incumbent
- Assumed office 29 August 2019
- Preceded by: Pavlo Dziublyk
- Constituency: Zhytomyr Oblast, No. 66

Personal details
- Born: 27 August 1979 (age 46) Malyn, Ukrainian SSR, Soviet Union (now Ukraine)
- Party: Servant of the People
- Other political affiliations: Independent

Tetiana Mykolayivna Hryshchenko (Ukrainian: Тетяна Миколаївна Грищенко; born 27 August 1979) is a Ukrainian politician currently serving as a People's Deputy of Ukraine from Ukraine's 66th electoral district since 29 August 2019.

== Biography ==
Tetiana Mykolayivna Hryshchenko was born on 27 August 1979 in the city of Malyn in Zhytomyr Oblast. She is a graduate of the Malyn Forestry College, specialising in accounting. She worked in the social services of Malyn Raion from 2011 to 2016, and as part of the local electoral commission from 2004 to 2019.

In the 2010 Ukrainian presidential election, Hryshchenko was a member of the district electoral commission representing the campaign of Vasyl Humenyuk. In the 2012 Ukrainian parliamentary election, she represented the Green Planet Ukrainian Party in the district electoral commission. During the 2014 Ukrainian parliamentary election, she represented the Party of Regions, and in the 2019 Ukrainian presidential election, she represented Yuriy Boyko in the first round before representing Volodymyr Zelenskyy in the second round.

In the 2019 Ukrainian parliamentary election, Hryshchenko was a candidate for People's Deputy of Ukraine from Ukraine's 66th electoral district, as a member of Servant of the People. At the time of her election, she was an independent. She was ultimately successful in the election, collecting 28.75% of the vote and defeating the next-closest challenger, former People's Deputy Vitaly Zhuravsky, by a margin of 8.29%.

In the Verkhovna Rada (Ukraine's parliament), Hryshchenko is a member of the Verkhovna Rada Committee on Agriculture and Land Policies. According to information portal Slovo i Dilo, as of February 2021, she had fulfilled only one of her electoral promises (an independent audit of Ukraine's highway system).
