= Pavlo Melnyk =

Ukrainian politician

- Павло Мельник
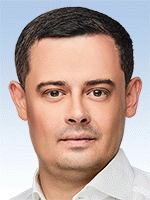
- Official portrait, 2019

People's Deputy of Ukraine
- Incumbent
- Assumed office 29 August 2019
- Preceded by: Serhiy Valentyrov
- Constituency: Zaporizhzhia Oblast, No. 81

Personal details
- Born: 26 June 1984 (age 42) Zaporizhzhia, Ukrainian SSR, Soviet Union (now Ukraine)
- Party: Servant of the People
- Other political affiliations: Independent
- Education: Zaporizhzhia National University

Pavlo Viktorovych Melnyk (Ukrainian: Павло Вікторович Мельник; born 26 June 1984) is a Ukrainian politician currently serving as a People's Deputy of Ukraine representing Ukraine's 81st electoral district as a member of Servant of the People since 2019.

== Early life and career ==
Pavlo Viktorovych Melnyk was born on 26 June 1984 in the city of Zaporizhzhia in southern Ukraine. He is a graduate of Zaporizhzhia National University's faculty of foreign philology, becoming qualified as a master of philology and a translator. He later became a qualified teacher of higher education. Prior to his election, Melnyk was public relations director of the "Alcohol STOP" charity, and was awarded by the Zaporizhzhia City Council for his activities.

Melnyk also worked in journalism and television presentation prior to his election, organising regional-level sections of national beauty contests. He was a winner of Ukrainian music competitions, and took classes in public relations and political science.

== Political career ==
During the 2019 Ukrainian parliamentary election, Melnyk was the candidate of Servant of the People for People's Deputy of Ukraine in Ukraine's 81st electoral district. At the time of the election, he was an independent. He was successfully elected, defeating incumbent Serhiy Valentyrov (running as a member of Opposition Platform — For Life) with 33.12% of the vote to Valentyrov's 30.35%.

In the Verkhovna Rada (Ukraine's parliament), Melnyk joined the Servant of the People faction, as well as the Verkhovna Rada Committee on Ukrainian Integration with the European Union and the Parliamentary Platform for Fighting Tuberculosis inter-factional association. According to analysis conducted by anti-corruption non-governmental organisation Chesno, Melnyk proposed more bills than any other People's Deputy from Zaporizhzhia Oblast in 2019.

In 2022, Melnyk was among the signatories of a proposal to Chairman of the Verkhovna Rada Ruslan Stefanchuk to deprive members of the national and local governments of their duties if they were members of pro-Russian parties. He also voted in favour of the controversial urban planning reform, which was regarded by Chesno as placing control of reconstruction following the 2022 Russian invasion of Ukraine into the hands of developers, rather than citizens.
