= Mykhailo Laba =

Ukrainian politician

- Михайло Лаба
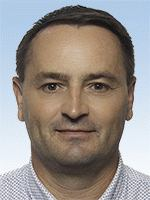
- Official portrait, 2019

People's Deputy of Ukraine
- Incumbent
- Assumed office 29 August 2019
- Preceded by: Mykhailo Lano
- Constituency: Zakarpattia Oblast, No. 70

Personal details
- Born: 29 October 1975 (age 50) Turia Poliana, Ukrainian SSR, Soviet Union (now Ukraine)
- Party: Servant of the People
- Other political affiliations: Independent

Mykhailo Mykhailovych Laba (Ukrainian: Михайло Михайлович Лаба; born 29 October 1975) is a Ukrainian politician currently serving as a People's Deputy of Ukraine from Ukraine's 70th electoral district since 29 August 2019.

== Early life and career ==
Mykhailo Mykhailovych Laba was born on 29 October 1975 in the village of Tur'ia Poliana, in Zakarpattia Oblast of what was then the Ukrainian Soviet Socialist Republic. He graduated from Uzhhorod National University with a degree in law in 2008.

== Political career ==
From 1998 to 2002, he served as a member of the village council of Nevytskyi, before serving as a member of the Uzhhorod Raion council from 2002 to 2010. He then became mayor of Nevytskyi, serving until 2019.

In the 2019 Ukrainian parliamentary election, Laba ran as the candidate of Servant of the People in Ukraine's 70th electoral district, and was successfully elected. At the time of his election, he was an independent. Following his election, he became a member of the Verkhovna Rada Budget Committee.

On 15 May 2020, a Molotov cocktail was thrown at Laba's home by an unknown individual. Laba, who was uninjured, reported the incident to the police.
