= Viktoria Vahnier =

Ukrainian politician

- Вікторія Вагнєр
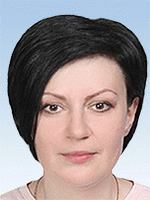
- Official portrait, 2019

People's Deputy of Ukraine
- Incumbent
- Assumed office 29 August 2019
- Preceded by: Yuriy Odarchenko
- Constituency: Kherson Oblast, No. 183

Personal details
- Born: 21 May 1981 (age 45) Georgiyevka, Kazakh SSR, Soviet Union (now Qalbatau, Kazakhstan)
- Party: Servant of the People
- Other political affiliations: Independent; Petro Poroshenko Bloc
- Education: National University of Kharkiv

Viktoria Oleksandrivna Vahnier (Ukrainian: Вікторія Олександрівна Вагнєр; born 21 May 1981) is a Ukrainian politician currently serving as a People's Deputy of Ukraine from Servant of the People representing Ukraine's 183rd electoral district since 29 August 2019.

== Early life and career ==
Viktoria Oleksandrivna Vahnier was born on 21 May 1981 in the village of Qalbatau (then called Georgiyevka), in what was then the Kazakh Soviet Socialist Republic of the Soviet Union. She is a graduate of the Kherson Basic Medical College as an obstetric paramedic, and from the National University of Kharkiv with a specialisation in medical business. She also specialised in obstetrics and gynaecology after completing an internship at the O. S. Luchanskyi City Clinical Hospital. She is currently studying at the Kherson National Technical University's public management and administration faculty.

From 2016, Vahnier was head doctor of the Oblast Rehabilitation Hospital of the Kherson Oblast Council. Prior to this, she headed the Oberih company, helping Ukrainian veterans of the war in Donbas, and she is additionally co-founder of the Ukrainian Life charitable foundation. She is the widow of Vladyslav Kovalov, a doctor who was killed in Donetsk Oblast.

== Political career ==
In the 2015 Ukrainian local elections, Vahnier was an unsuccessful candidate in elections to the Kherson Oblast Council as a candidate from the Petro Poroshenko Bloc.

In the 2019 Ukrainian parliamentary election, Vahnier ran for the office of People's Deputy of Ukraine from Ukraine's 183rd electoral district as the candidate of Servant of the People. At the time of the election, she was an independent. This time, she was successfully elected, winning with 39.36% of the vote. In second place was former People's Deputy Mykhailo Opanashchenko of the pro-Russian Opposition Platform — For Life party with 14.56%. In fourth place was incumbent People's Deputy Yuriy Odarchenko of Batkivshchyna, who won only 7.31% of the vote.

In the Verkhovna Rada (parliament of Ukraine), Vahnier joined the Servant of the People faction and the Verkhovna Rada Committee on National Health, Healthcare, and Health Insurance. She is also a member of the inter-factional associations South Ukraine and the Parliamentary Platform to Fight Tuberculosis.
