= Hanna Lichman =

Ukrainian politician

- Ганна Лічман
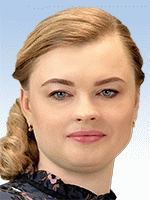

People's Deputy of Ukraine
- Incumbent
- Assumed office 29 August 2019

Personal details
- Born: 31 January 1978 (age 48) Odesa, Ukrainian SSR, Soviet Union (now Odesa, Ukraine)
- Party: Servant of the People
- Education: Oles Honchar Dnipro National University

Hanna Vasylivna Lichman (Ukrainian: Ганна Василівна Лічман. Born 31 January 1978) is a Ukrainian politician, who has been a People's Deputy, having been elected to the Verkhovna Rada in 2019.

== Early life and career ==
Lichman was born on 31 January 1978 in Odesa. Her mother was an English teacher, and then the director of a school. In 1995, Lichman graduated from Odesa School No. 67, after which she entered the Oles Honchar Dnipro National University, where she studied journalism. In 1996, she became a member of the National Union of Journalists of Ukraine.

== Political activity ==
After graduating from university, Lichman began working in the field of public opinion formation and corporate PR. Since 2001, she has been working at the ATB-Market, where she was the head of the press service. From 2017 to 2019, she held the position of Head of Corporate Communications at ATB. She was the director of the charitable foundation "ATB". She founded the garden partnership "Mriya".

In the 2019 Ukrainian parliamentary election, Lichman was elected as a deputy in constituency No. 30 (part of the city of Kamianske, Dnipropetrovsk Oblast) from the Servant of the People party. In the Verkhovna Rada, she became a member of the committee on economic development, head of the subcommittee on regulatory policy. It is part of the inter-factional association "Dnepr!".

== Personal life ==
Lichman has a daughter named Sofia. As of 2020, her personal monetary assets amounted to 2.6 million hryvnia.
