= Andriy Strikharskyi =

Ukrainian politician

- Андрій Стріхарський
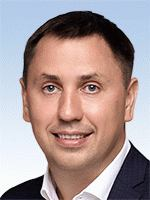
- Official portrait, 2019

People's Deputy of Ukraine
- Incumbent
- Assumed office 29 August 2019
- Preceded by: Hennadiy Bobov
- Constituency: Cherkasy Oblast, No. 196

Personal details
- Born: 4 August 1981 (age 45) Oleksandriia, Ukrainian SSR, Soviet Union (now Ukraine)
- Party: Servant of the People
- Other political affiliations: Independent
- Education: Kyiv National University of Construction and Architecture

Andriy Petrovych Strikharskyi (Ukrainian: Андрій Петрович Стріхарський; born 4 August 1981) is a Ukrainian politician currently serving as a People's Deputy of Ukraine representing Ukraine's 196th electoral district from Servant of the People since 2019.

== Early life and career ==
Andriy Petrovych Strikharskyi was born on 4 August 1981 in the city of Oleksandriia, in central Ukraine. He is a graduate of the Kyiv National University of Construction and Architecture, specialising in industrial and civil construction. From 2005 to 2019, he was director of the Status Group real estate construction company, as well as chairman of the supervisory board. He is also the founder of UkrHranitIndustria TOV and director of the Berezniakyzhytlobud construction and investment company.

== Political career ==
Prior to running for the Verkhovna Rada (Ukraine's national parliament), Strikharskyi was an independent candidate for the Kyiv City Council during the 2014 Kyiv local election. However, he was not elected.

In the 2019 Ukrainian parliamentary election, Strikharskyi ran as the candidate of Servant of the People for People's Deputy of Ukraine in Ukraine's 196th electoral district. At the time of the election, he was an independent. He was elected, defeating incumbent People's Deputy Hennadiy Bobov with 38.89% of the vote compared to Bobov's 27.30%.

In the Verkhovna Rada, Strikharskyi joined the Servant of the People faction, as well as the Verkhovna Rada Committee on Organisation of State Power and Local Self-Government. Strikharskyi has been criticised by anti-corruption non-governmental organisation Chesno for his September 2022 vote in favour of laws which diluted the authority of government anti-corruption bodies. He is also involved in multiple anti-corruption investigations.
