= Oleksandr Haidu =

Ukrainian politician

- Олександр Гайду
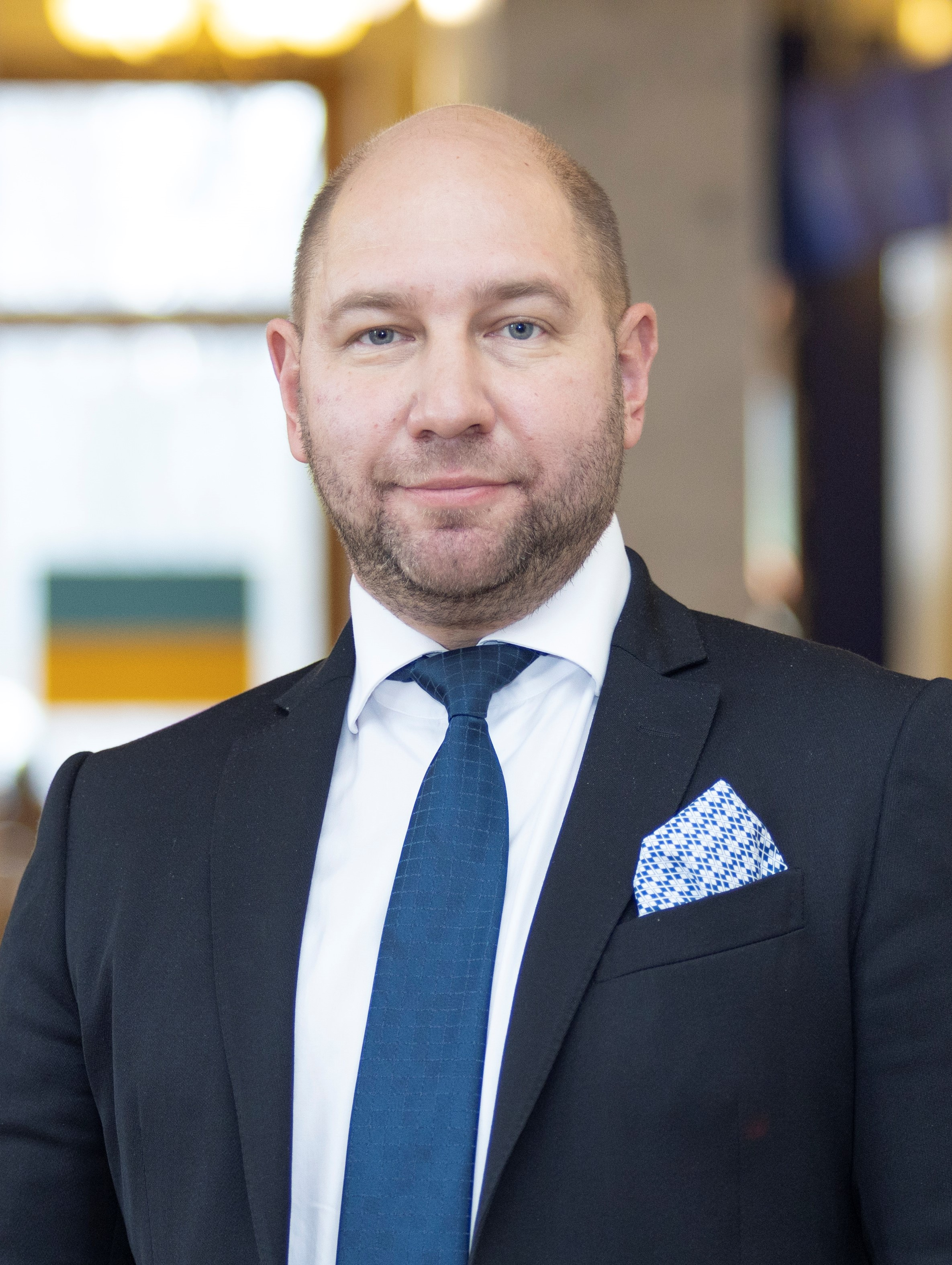

People's Deputy of Ukraine
- Incumbent
- Assumed office 29 August 2019
- Preceded by: Artem Iliuk
- Constituency: Mykolaiv Oblast, No. 128

Personal details
- Born: 28 January 1976 (age 50) Odesa, Ukrainian SSR, Soviet Union (now Ukraine)
- Party: Servant of the People
- Other political affiliations: Independent
- Education: Odesa National Economics University; Odesa University

Oleksandr Vasylovych Haidu (Ukrainian: Олександр Васильович Гайду; born 28 January 1976) is a Ukrainian politician currently serving as a People's Deputy of Ukraine representing Ukraine's 128th electoral district as a member of Servant of the People since 2019. Previously, he worked in vessel and freight management in the city of Odesa.

== Early life and career ==
Oleksandr Vasylovych Haidu was born on 28 January 1976 in the city of Odesa in southern Ukraine. He is a graduate of the Odesa National Economics University, specialising in entrepreneurial management, and Odesa University, specialising in jurisprudence. From 1998 to 2004, he worked as a commercial lawyer at the Bank of Ukraine before moving to the maritime industry, heading MSP Nika-Terra TOV, a company responsible for vessel and freight management. In April 2012 he became the company's chairman after it was taken over by Ukrainian oligarch Dmytro Firtash, though he left this position on 23 March 2017. In 2017, he successfully defended his thesis, "Mechanisms of Public Administration," at the Petro Mohyla Black Sea State University and became a candidate for public administration sciences.

== Political career ==
In the 2019 Ukrainian parliamentary election, Haidu was the candidate of Servant of the People for People's Deputy of Ukraine in Ukraine's 128th electoral district, located in the city of Mykolaiv. At the time of the election, he was an independent. He was successfully elected, winning with 41.34% of the vote. Independent incumbent Artem Iliuk placed second, with 23.87% of the vote.

In the Verkhovna Rada (national parliament of Ukraine), Haidu joined the Servant of the People faction, the Verkhovna Rada Committee on Agricultural and Land Policies, and the South Ukraine inter-factional association. He was criticised for his late 2022 vote on urban planning reform by anti-corruption non-governmental organisation Chesno, which claims the bill puts reconstruction of Ukraine following the Russian invasion into the hands of urban developers.

Haidu became embroiled in a corruption scandal in January 2022 when, after being invited to a restaurant in Odesa, his wife was refused a seat due to her refusal to show proof of a COVID-19 vaccination. In response, Haidu initiated the temporary closure of the restaurant by demanding inspections from city and state health authorities. On 1 August 2022, the National Agency for Prevention of Corruption initiated administrative protocols against Haidu for misuse of his authority as a People's Deputy.
