= Serhiy Koleboshyn =

Ukrainian politician

- Сергій Колебошин
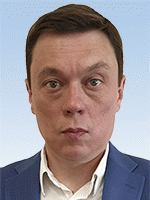
- Official portrait, 2019

People's Deputy of Ukraine
- Incumbent
- Assumed office 29 August 2019
- Preceded by: Vasyl Huliaiev
- Constituency: Odesa Oblast, No. 140

Personal details
- Born: 22 November 1977 (age 48) Odesa, Ukrainian SSR, Soviet Union (now Ukraine)
- Party: Servant of the People
- Other political affiliations: Independent; NUNS Bloc; Agrarian Party of Ukraine
- Education: Odesa University

Serhiy Valeriyovych Koleboshyn (Ukrainian: Сергій Валерійович Колебошин; born 22 November 1977) is a Ukrainian politician currently serving as a People's Deputy of Ukraine, representing Ukraine's 140th electoral district as a member of Servant of the People since 29 August 2019.

== Early life and career ==
Serhiy Valeriyovych Koleboshyn was born on 22 November 1977 in the southern Ukrainian city of Odesa, then under the rule of the Soviet Union. He is a graduate of Odesa University, specialising in physics. After his graduation, he became a physics teacher. In addition to his native Ukrainian, he is fluent in the English language.

Prior to his election, Koleboshyn worked as a laboratory teacher and physics teacher at the Richeliu lyceum in Odesa from 1999 to 2000 and from 2000 to 2009, respectively. From 2009 to 2017, he was director of the 1st-3rd grade higher secondary school in Ovidiopol. He is also the founder of Osvita-online, an online learning programme.

== Political career ==
In the 2006 Ukrainian local elections, Koleboshyn was an unsuccessful candidate for the Odesa Oblast Council as a member of the Our Ukraine–People's Self-Defense Bloc. In the 2015 Ukrainian local elections, he was elected to Ovidiopol Raion Council, this time as a member of the Agrarian Party of Ukraine.

In the 2019 Ukrainian parliamentary election Koleboshyn ran to be a People's Deputy of Ukraine from Ukraine's 140th electoral district as the candidate of Servant of the People. At the time of his election, he was an independent. He was elected, defeating incumbent independent People's Deputy Vasyl Huliaiev by a margin of 21.33% (43.11% to 21.78%).

In the Verkhovna Rada (Ukraine's parliament), Koleboshyn joined the Servant of the People faction and became deputy head of the Verkhovna Rada Committee on Education, Science, and Innovation. He also joined the inter-factional associations For Odeshchyna, South Ukraine, Parliamentary Platform to Fight Tuberculosis, For Self-Employed Persons, and Energy and Environment.
