= Ihor Murdiy =

Ukrainian politician

- Ігор Мурдій
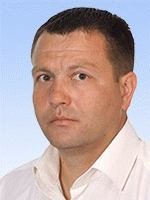

People's Deputy of Ukraine
- Incumbent
- Assumed office 29 August 2019
- Preceded by: Stanislav Berezkin
- Constituency: Kirovohrad Oblast, No. 100

Personal details
- Born: 8 August 1982 (age 44) Novoukrainka, Ukrainian SSR, Soviet Union (now Ukraine)
- Party: Servant of the People
- Other political affiliations: Independent
- Education: Central Ukrainian National Technical University; Kharkiv National Automobile and Highway University

Ihor Yuriyovych Murdiy (Ukrainian: Ігор Юрійович Мурдій; born 8 August 1982) is a Ukrainian politician currently serving as a People's Deputy of Ukraine from Ukraine's 100th electoral district as a member of Servant of the People since 2019.

== Early life and career ==
Ihor Yuriyovych Murdiy was born on 8 August 1982 in the city of Novoukrainka, in central Ukraine. He is a graduate of the Central Ukrainian National Technical University with a specialisation in lifting and transport engineering, construction, road, reclamation, and land-moving machines, and equipment. He is also a graduate of the Kharkiv National Automobile and Highway University specialising in road and airfield construction.

Murdiy began his professional career as a design engineer in the technical department of Budmash in 2005. He later worked as a safety specialist at NVP Evrotek, a civil construction firm in Kyiv, before becoming head of safety in the technical supervisory and inspection body of Kirovohrad Oblast in 2007. From 2008 to 2009, Murdiy was head engineer of Hradotek PP, a Kropyvnytskyi-based building materials company. He was later head of the Novhorodka branch of Kirovohradskyi Oblavtodor, a state-owned enterprise, from 2010 before becoming part of a Kropyvnytskyi (then Kirovohrad) City Council effort for green economy in 2013. Since 2015, he has worked at Tekh Tsentr PP, a road repair company.

== Political career ==
Murdiy ran in the 2019 Ukrainian parliamentary election to become People's Deputy of Ukraine in Ukraine's 100th electoral district. He was the candidate of Servant of the People in the election, though he was an independent at the time of the election. He was successfully elected, defeating incumbent People's Deputy Stanislav Berezkin, who ran as an independent, with 43.47% of the vote compared to Berezkin's 16.63%.

In the Verkhovna Rada (Ukraine's parliament), Murdiy joined the Servant of the People faction and the Verkhovna Rada Committee on Transport and Infrastructure. He is also part of the South Ukraine and Ukrainians in the World inter-factional associations.
