= Yuriy Kuzbyt =

Ukrainian politician

- Юрій Кузбит
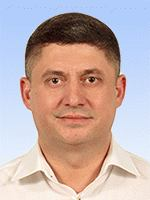
- Official portrait, 2019

People's Deputy of Ukraine
- Incumbent
- Assumed office 29 August 2019
- Preceded by: Mykhailo Poplavskyi
- Constituency: Kirovohrad Oblast, No. 101

Personal details
- Born: 29 March 1977 (age 49) Ivano-Frankivsk, Ukrainian SSR, Soviet Union (now Ukraine)
- Party: Servant of the People
- Other political affiliations: Independent
- Education: Vasyl Stefanyk Precarpathian National University

Yuriy Mykhailovych Kuzbyt (Ukrainian: Юрій Михайлович Кузбит; born 29 March 1977) is a Ukrainian politician currently serving as a People's Deputy of Ukraine representing Ukraine's 101st electoral district as a member of Servant of the People since 2019.

== Early life and career ==
Yuriy Mykhailovych Kuzbyt was born on 29 March 1977 in the city of Ivano-Frankivsk, located in western Ukraine. He graduated from the Vasyl Stefanyk Precarpathian National University, specialising in jurisprudence. In 2016, he became a recognised lawyer.

In 2000, Kuzbyt was hired as a lawyer by the government of Ivano-Frankivsk Oblast. The next year, he became head of the legal department of Ruslana-Tekstyl TOV. He was also head of the legal department for matters of land at the private European University in Kyiv.

From 2006 to 2008, Kuzbyt was manager of memorials, museums, and reserves at the Ukrainian Institute of National Memory. He was also an assistant to deputy director of the Institute of National Memory.

Prior to his election, Kuzbyt was owner of Precedent legal group, a legal consulting and representation firm. He provided legal aid to multiple businesses, and additionally served as deputy director of AiSiDi YuA TOV and KSH Bank from 2014 to 2015.

== Political career ==
Kuzbyt was the candidate of Servant of the People for Ukraine's 101st electoral district during the 2019 Ukrainian parliamentary election. At the time, he was an independent. He was successfully elected, defeating independent Maxym Polyakov (formerly a party-list deputy from the People's Front) with 42.15% of the vote compared to Polyakov's 20.60%.

In the Verkhovna Rada (national parliament of Ukraine), Kuzbyt joined the Servant of the People faction, the Verkhovna Rada Budget Committee, and the inter-factional associations "Ukrainians in the World", Kirovohradshchyna, South Ukraine, and the "Parliamentary Platform for Fighting Tuberculosis". Kuzbyt was criticised by non-governmental organisations for his 2022 vote in favour of urban planning reform, which anti-corruption NGO Chesno claims is in the interest of land developers.
