= Oleksandr Aliksiychuk =

Ukrainian politician

- Олександр Аліксійчук
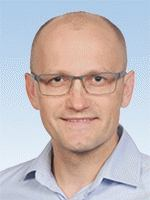
- Official portrait, 2019

People's Deputy of Ukraine
- Incumbent
- Assumed office 29 August 2019
- Preceded by: Oleksandr Dekhtiarchuk
- Constituency: Rivne Oblast, No. 154

Personal details
- Born: 6 March 1981 (age 45) Bushcha, Ukrainian SSR, Soviet Union (now Ukraine)
- Party: Servant of the People
- Other political affiliations: Independent
- Education: National University of Water and Nature Management; National Academy for Public Administration

Oleksandr Vasylovych Aliksiychuk (Ukrainian: Олександр Васильович Аліксійчук; born 6 March 1981) is a Ukrainian politician currently serving as a People's Deputy of Ukraine from Ukraine's 154th electoral district since 29 August 2019, as a member of Servant of the People political party.

== Early life and career ==
Oleksandr Vasylovych Aliksiychuk was born on 6 March 1981 in the village of Bushcha, in Ukraine's Rivne Oblast. He is a graduate of the National University of Water and Nature Management, specialising in lifting, construction, road and land reclamation machines, and equipment. He is also a graduate of the National Academy for Public Administration with a specialisation in parliamentarism and public administration.

Prior to his entry into politics, Aliksiychuk worked in the construction industry, particularly at the companies Torhbud-Servis LLC and Budtekh-Plus LLC. He was also active in philanthropy, working at the DRUH All-Ukrainian Fund for Assisting the Families of Ukraine's Heroes and organising children's sporting events in the city of Rivne and Rivne Oblast.

== Political career ==
In the 2019 Ukrainian presidential election's first round, Aliksiychuk participated in the campaign of Andriy Sadovyi prior to Sadovyi's withdrawal from the race.

Aliksiychuk ran in the 2019 Ukrainian parliamentary election as the candidate nominated by Servant of the People for the position of People's Deputy of Ukraine in the 154th Electoral districts of Ukraine, consisting of the city of Dubno and surrounding areas. At the time of the election, he was an independent. Aliksiychuk won the election with 36.01% of the vote, compared to 15.33% of the vote garnered by the incumbent People's Deputy Oleksandr Dekhtiarchuk. In the Verkhovna Rada (Ukraine's parliament), Aliksiychuk joined the Verkhovna Rada Committees on Organisation of State Power and Local Self-Rule, Regional Development, and Urban Planning.

On 11 November 2021, Aliksiychuk's car was set on fire by unknown individuals. At the time, the car was being used by Artur Byts, an assistant of Aliksiychuk. Byts and Aliksiychuk both stated that they suspected political reasons were behind the fire.
