= Eduard Proshchuk =

Ukrainian businessman and politician

- Едуард Прощук
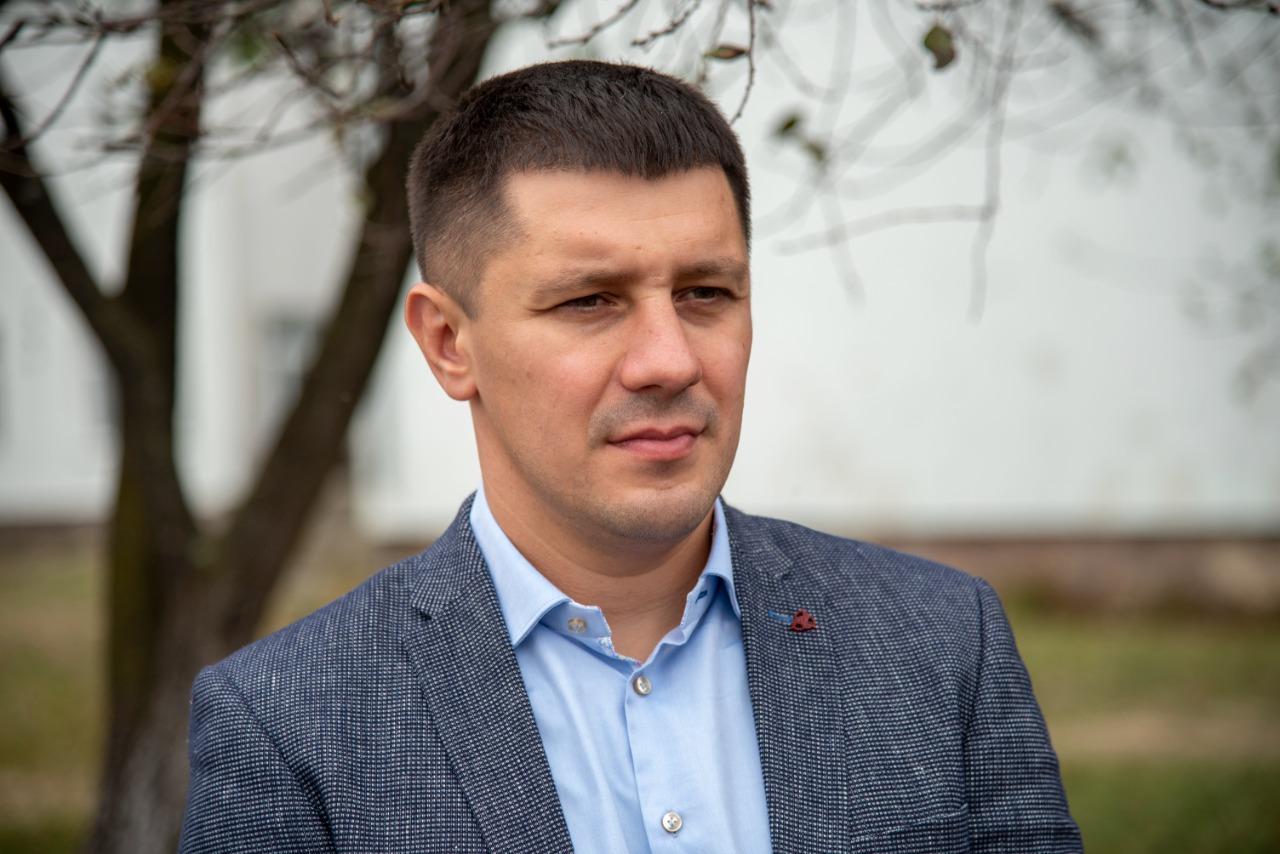

People's Deputy of Ukraine
- Incumbent
- Assumed office 29 August 2019
- Preceded by: Viktor Shevchenko
- Constituency: Ivano-Frankivsk Oblast, No. 85

Personal details
- Born: 19 February 1982 (age 44) Kalush, Ukrainian SSR, Soviet Union (now Ukraine)
- Party: Servant of the People
- Other political affiliations: Independent
- Education: Vasyl Stefanyk Precarpathian National University

Eduard Petrovych Proshchuk (Ukrainian: Едуард Петрович Прощук; born 19 February 1982) is a Ukrainian businessman and politician currently serving as a People's Deputy of Ukraine from Ukraine's 85th electoral district since 29 August 2019 as a member of Servant of the People.

== Early life and career ==
Eduard Petrovych Proshchuk was born on 19 February 1982, in the city of Kalush, in Ukraine's Ivano-Frankivsk Oblast. From 1999 to 2004, he studied at the Vasyl Stefanyk Precarpathian National University, graduating with a specialisation in finance. He also studied at the International Management Institute, completing a mini-Master of Business Administration course. Since 2018, he has been a graduate student at the Vasyl Stefanyk Precarpathian National University.

From 2001 to 2003, Proshchuk was manager of Halant-Servis LLC, and from 2003 to 2010 he was the company's commercial director before becoming director, a position he held until 2012. From 2009 to 2011, he was also director of Skif, a consumer cooperative.

Proshchuk has also been active in the promotion of sports in Ivano-Frankivsk Oblast, particularly wrestling. He is president of the Ivano-Frankivsk Oblast Wrestling Association, vice-president of the Sports Wrestling Association of Ukraine since 2018, and a Master of Sports of Ukraine.

== Political career ==
In the 2019 Ukrainian parliamentary election, Proshchuk ran for People's Deputy of Ukraine in Ukraine's 85th electoral district as the candidate of Servant of the People. At the time of the election, he was an independent. He won the election, defeating incumbent People's Deputy Viktor Shevchenko with 30.65% of the vote to Shevchenko's 28.98%. In the Verkhovna Rada (Ukraine's parliament), he became a member of the Verkhovna Rada Committee on Environmental Policies and Nature Management. According to his website, Proshchuk's priorities are the roads of Prykarpattia, the environment, and development of sports.

In March 2020, Proshchuk was among those opposed to the establishment of an advisory group to the Trilateral Contact Group on Ukraine involving separatist figures, contrary to the position of Servant of the People.
