= Stepan Cherniavskyi =

Ukrainian politician

- Степан Чернявський
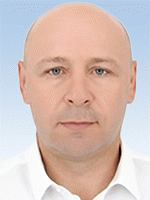
- Official portrait, 2019

People's Deputy of Ukraine
- Incumbent
- Assumed office 29 August 2019
- Preceded by: Ivan Fursin
- Constituency: Odesa Oblast, No. 178

Personal details
- Born: 4 May 1973 (age 53) Ivanivka, Ukrainian SSR, Soviet Union (now Ukraine)
- Party: Servant of the People
- Other political affiliations: Independent
- Education: Odesa National Academy of Food Technologies

Stepan Mykolaiovych Cherniavskyi (Ukrainian: Степан Миколайович Чернявський; born 4 May 1973) is a Ukrainian politician currently serving as a People's Deputy of Ukraine representing Ukraine's 178th electoral district as a member of Servant of the People since 29 August 2019.

== Early life and career ==
Stepan Mykolaiovych Cherniavskyi was born on 4 May 1973 in the settlement of Ivanivka, Odesa Oblast. In 1995, he graduated from the Odesa National Academy of Food Technologies, specialising in mechanical engineering.

Prior to his election, Cherniavskyi worked as a mechanical engineer at the Byhodnia Bread Processing Plant and the Port of Odesa. He also was the founder and head of Ahrostar Export TOV. He has founded two other companies: Meat Service TOV and PMK-2015 TOV.

== Political career ==
In the 2019 Ukrainian parliamentary election, Cherniavskyi launched a campaign to be People's Deputy of Ukraine in Ukraine's 178th electoral district. He was the candidate of the Servant of the People party in the election. At the time of the election, he was an independent. He proved successful, being elected with 37.18% of the vote. His next-closest opponent, Olha Poliuhanich of Batkivshchyna, won 20.41% of the vote, and incumbent People's Deputy Ivan Fursin (an independent) placed in fourth, with 15.43% of the vote. In the Verkhovna Rada (national parliament of Ukraine), Cherniavskyi joined the Servant of the People faction, as well as the Verkhovna Rada Committee on Agriculture and Land Policies, which he serves as deputy chair of.
