= Oleksandr Matusevych =

Ukrainian politician

- Олександр Матусевич
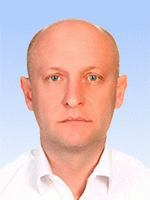
- Official portrait, 2019

People's Deputy of Ukraine
- Incumbent
- Assumed office 29 August 2019
- Preceded by: Anatoliy Dyriv
- Constituency: Ivano-Frankivsk Oblast, No. 85

Personal details
- Born: 20 March 1974 (age 52) Staryi Mizun, Ukrainian SSR, Soviet Union (now Ukraine)
- Party: Servant of the People
- Other political affiliations: UKROP (From 2015); Independent
- Education: Ukrainian National Forestry University

Oleksandr Borysovych Matusevych (Ukrainian: Олександр Борисович Матусевич; born 20 March 1974) is a Ukrainian politician currently serving as a People's Deputy of Ukraine from Ukraine's 86th electoral district since 29 August 2019. He is a member of Servant of the People.

== Early life and career ==
Oleksandr Borysovych Matusevych was born on 20 March 1974 in the village of Staryi Mizun, within Ukraine's western Ivano-Frankivsk Oblast. He is a graduate of the Ukrainian National Forestry University, specialising in forestry engineering. From 1996, he worked at Solotvy Forestry, then Ilmian Forestry, before finally transferring to Sobolsky Forestry in 1999, where he worked for fourteen years. From 2014, Matusevych was director of Vyhodsk Forestry. The same year, he became a member of the Vyhodsk Educational and Rehabilitation Centre's board of trustees.

== Political career ==
In the 2015 Ukrainian local elections, Matusevych was elected as a member of the Ivano-Frankivsk Oblast Council from its 15th district as a member of the UKROP party. He was deputy chair of the Oblast Council's Commission on the Environment and Rational Management of Nature.

Matusevych was a candidate for People's Deputy of Ukraine in the 2019 Ukrainian parliamentary election in Ukraine's 86th electoral district. During the election, he was the candidate of Servant of the People, though he was officially an independent at the time. He was successfully elected, defeating incumbent People's Deputy Anatoliy Dyriv with 27.95% of the vote compared to Dyriv's 26.70%.

Matusevych is one of the members of the informal "Kolomoyskyi Group" within the Servant of the People's parliamentary faction, a group of deputies tied politically to Ukrainian oligarch Ihor Kolomoyskyi and led by Oleksandr Dubinsky. He is also a member of the Verkhovna Rada Committee on Environmental Policy and Nature Management.
