= Oleksandr Danutsa =

Ukrainian politician (born 1980)

- Олександр Дануца
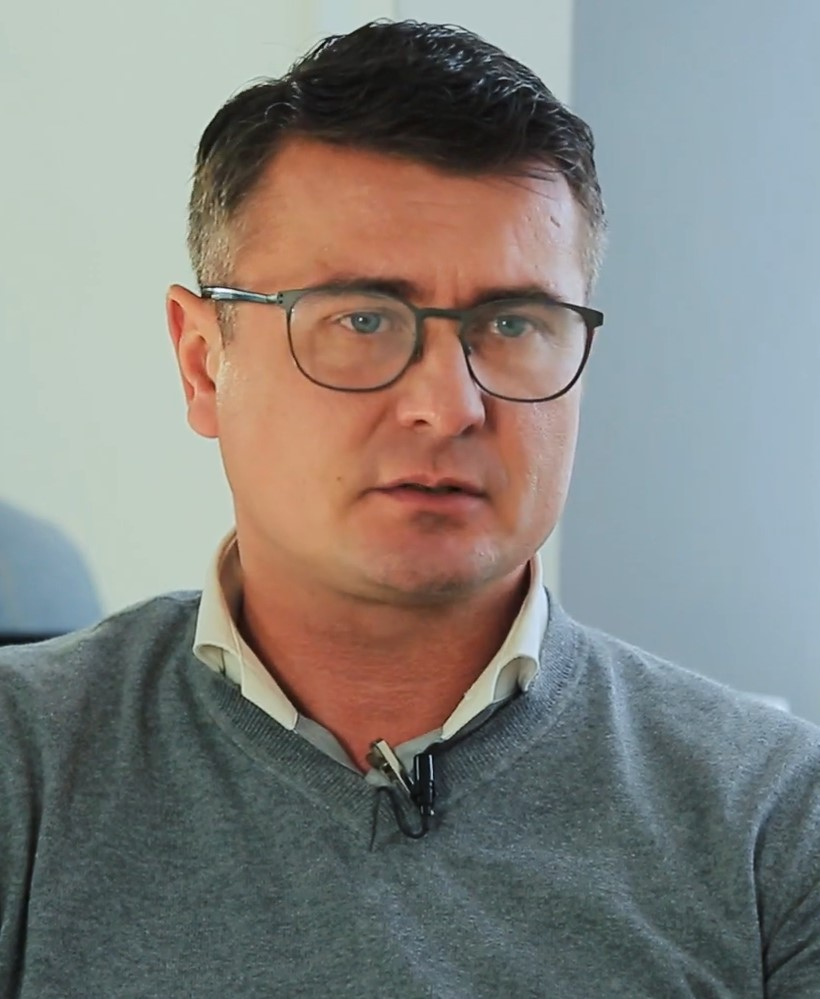
- Danutsa in 2019

People's Deputy of Ukraine
- Incumbent
- Assumed office 29 August 2019
- Preceded by: Kostiantyn Yarynich
- Constituency: Kirovohrad Oblast, No. 99

Personal details
- Born: 29 January 1980 (age 46) Mala Vyska, Ukrainian SSR, Soviet Union (now Ukraine)
- Party: Servant of the People
- Other political affiliations: People's Movement of Ukraine; Our Ukraine–People's Self-Defense Bloc; Ukraine – Forward!; Petro Poroshenko Bloc
- Education: Kirovohrad Technical University

Oleksandr Anatoliyovych Danutsa (Ukrainian: Олександр Анатолійович Дануца; born 29 January 1980) is a Ukrainian politician currently serving as a People's Deputy of Ukraine representing Ukraine's 99th electoral district as a member of Servant of the People since 2019.

== Early life and career ==
Oleksandr Anatoliyovych Danutsa was born on 29 January 1980 in the city of Mala Vyska, in Ukraine's central Kirovohrad Oblast. He is a graduate of the Kirovohrad Technical University (now called the Central Ukrainian Technical University), specialising in organisational management.

Before his election, Danutsa was founder and general director of Kropyvnytskyi-based media group Prime-Time TOV, as well as a journalist. He additionally worked at Naftogaz, was president of the Foundation for Support of Independent Press, and founded the Kropyvnytskyi-based Ukrainian Student Union.

== Political career ==
Danutsa first ran for office in 2002, running for the Kirovohrad (now Kropyvnytskyi) City Council for the People's Movement of Ukraine. In the 2002 Ukrainian parliamentary election, he was an unsuccessful candidate for People's Deputy of Ukraine in Ukraine's 101st electoral district from Our Ukraine–People's Self-Defense Bloc. In the 2006 Ukrainian local elections, he again campaigned to become a member of the Kirovohrad City Council, this time as part of Our Ukraine Bloc. He launched two more unsuccessful campaigns, one in the 2012 Ukrainian parliamentary election as the Ukraine – Forward! candidate in Ukraine's 99th electoral district and one in the 2015 Ukrainian local elections for the Kropyvnytskyi City Council as a member of the Petro Poroshenko Bloc.

In the 2019 Ukrainian parliamentary election, Danutsa ran again to be People's Deputy of Ukraine in the 99th electoral district, this time as the candidate of Servant of the People. He was successfully elected, winning with 36.87% against incumbent People's Front party-list deputy Oleksandr Horbunov. Kostiantyn Yarynich, the independent incumbent deputy in the 99th district, placed in fourth with 10.74% of the vote.

In the Verkhovna Rada (Ukraine's parliament), Danutsa joined the Servant of the People faction, as well as the Verkhovna Rada Law Enforcement Committee and the Kirovohradshchyna inter-factional association.

Following a 2020 interview with Ukrainian news site LB.ua, Danutsa was suddenly removed as head of the Kirovohrad Oblast committee of Servant of the People and replaced by Mykyta Poturaiev, a party-list People's Deputy. Danutsa claimed his interview, in which he admitted that Servant of the People was performing poorly in polls for the 2020 Ukrainian local elections and expressed concern about factionalism within the party, was the cause of his removal, though Poturaiev and then-party leader Oleksandr Kornienko disputed this, citing "internal" reasons for Danutsa's removal.

In a 15 February 2022 meeting of the Verkhovna Rada during the prelude to the 2022 Russian invasion of Ukraine, Danutsa was one of 10 Servant of the People deputies to have not been present.
