= Volodymyr Tymofiychuk =

Ukrainian farmer and politician

- Володимир Тимофійчук
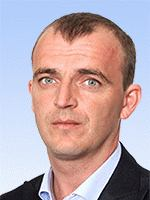
- Official portrait, 2019

People's Deputy of Ukraine
- Incumbent
- Assumed office 29 August 2019
- Preceded by: Yuriy Solovey
- Constituency: Ivano-Frankivsk Oblast, No. 89

Personal details
- Born: 17 February 1986 (age 40) Popelnyky, Ukrainian SSR, Soviet Union (now Ukraine)
- Party: Servant of the People
- Education: Chernivtsi University

Volodymyr Yaroslavovych Tymofiychuk (Ukrainian: Володимир Ярославович Тимофійчук; born 17 February 1986) is a Ukrainian farmer and politician currently serving as a People's Deputy of Ukraine from Ukraine's 89th electoral district as a member of Servant of the People since 29 August 2019.

== Early life and career ==
Volodymyr Yaroslavovych Tymofiychuk was born on 17 February 1986 in the village of Popelnyky, then under the rule of the Soviet Union. In 2008, he graduated from Chernivtsi University as an economist, specialising in accounting and audit. The same year, he began working in business. In 2018, he founded Ahro-Lider PE, an agricultural company specialising in the grain industry.

== People's Deputy of Ukraine ==
Tymofiychuk ran in the 2019 Ukrainian parliamentary election as the candidate of Servant of the People for People's Deputy of Ukraine in Ukraine's 89th electoral district. At the time of the election, he was a member of Servant of the People. Tymofiychuk was successfully elected, defeating independent candidate Dmytro Siredzhuk as well as incumbent People's Deputy Yuriy Solovey of the Ukrainian Democratic Alliance for Reform with 18.20% of the vote compared to Siredzhuk's 17.67% and Solovey's 14.83%.

In the Verkhovna Rada (Ukraine's parliament) Tymofiychuk joined the Servant of the People faction, as well as the Verkhovna Rada Committee on Agricultural and Land Policies. In March 2020, Tymofiychuk was among the People's Deputies to indicate their opposition to a proposal by the Trilateral Contact Group on Ukraine to establish an advisory council including separatists in an attempt to mediate an end to the war in Donbas. However, he later deleted the Facebook post which expressed his opposition.
