= Volodymyr Ivanov (politician, born 1982) =

Ukrainian politician

- Володимир Іванов
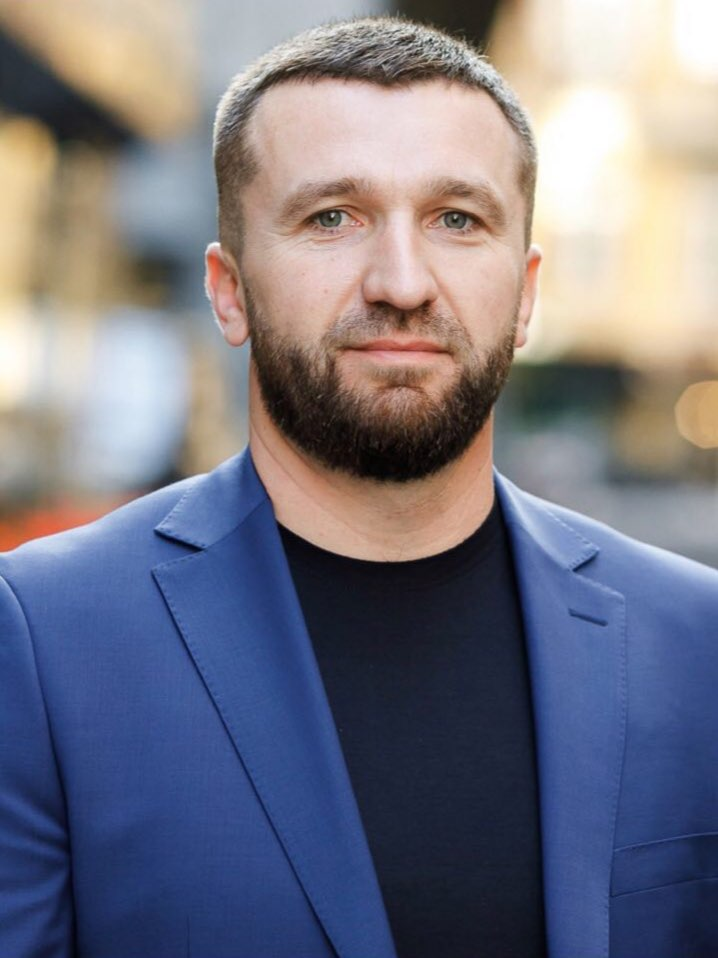

People's Deputy of Ukraine
- Incumbent
- Assumed office 29 August 2019
- Preceded by: Serhiy Khlan
- Constituency: Kherson Oblast, No. 185

Personal details
- Born: 14 July 1982 (age 44) Kherson, Ukrainian SSR, Soviet Union (now Ukraine)
- Party: Servant of the People
- Education: Kherson State Agricultural University

Volodymyr Illich Ivanov (Ukrainian: Володимир Ілліч Іванов; born 14 July 1982) is a Ukrainian politician currently serving as a People's Deputy of Ukraine from Ukraine's 185th electoral district since 29 August 2019. He is a member of Servant of the People.

== Early life and career ==
Volodymyr Illich Ivanov was born on 14 July 1982 in the city of Kherson, in southern Ukraine. He is a graduate of the Kherson State Agricultural University, specialising in construction engineering. He has held high positions at multiple companies; he was production director of Ahroproekt-Yuh TOV, manager of Bornmut TOV until 2019, and director of Kyivnorbud TOV until 2017.

== Political career ==
In the 2019 Ukrainian parliamentary election, Ivanov was the candidate of Servant of the People for People's Deputy of Ukraine in Ukraine's 185th electoral district. At the time of the election, he was a member of Servant of the People. He was eventually successfully elected, winning 31.23% of the vote. In second and third place was Pavlo Filipchuk of Opposition Platform — For Life (22.15%) and independent incumbent Serhiy Khlan (16.07%), respectively.

In the Verkhovna Rada (parliament of Ukraine), Ivanov joined the Servant of the People faction and became a member of the South Ukraine inter-fractional association and Verkhovna Rada Committee on State Power, and Local Self-Government. Ivanov's actions on the committee, particularly his support for a September 2022 bill, were criticised by anti-corruption non-governmental organisation Chesno for allegedly reducing the power of anti-corruption agencies within the Ukrainian government.

Ivanov also acquired attention during the COVID-19 pandemic in Ukraine, when, during remote sessions of the Verkhovna Rada Committee on State Power and Local Self-Government, an unknown woman took Ivanov's place and voted in his stead six occasions, in violation of both Ukrainian law and the Constitution of Ukraine. As a result of the events, Chairman of the Verkhovna Rada Dmytro Razumkov refused to consider remote work for the Verkhovna Rada as a whole.
