= Liubov Shpak =

Ukrainian politician

- Любов Шпак
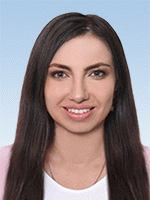
- Official portrait, 2019

People's Deputy of Ukraine
- Incumbent
- Assumed office 29 August 2019
- Preceded by: Oleh Petrenko
- Constituency: Cherkasy Oblast, No. 194

Personal details
- Born: 19 September 1980 (age 46) Kyiv, Ukrainian SSR, Soviet Union (now Ukraine)
- Party: Servant of the People
- Other political affiliations: Independent
- Education: Cherkasy State Technological University

Liubov Oleksandrivna Shpak (Ukrainian: Любов Олександрівна Шпак; born 19 August 1980) is a Ukrainian politician currently serving as a People's Deputy of Ukraine from Ukraine's 194th electoral district, consisting of the city of Cherkasy. She is a member of Servant of the People.

== Early life and career ==
Liubov Oleksandrivna Shpak was born on 19 August 1980 in the city of Kyiv, then under the Soviet Union. She graduated from the Cherkasy State Technological University as a doctor of economic sciences. Afterwards, she worked as an associate professor at the East European University of Economics and Management, serving as head of the finance department of the university before becoming the university's rector.

Shpak co-founded the "21st Century" charitable fund, operating in Cherkasy Oblast.

== Political career ==
Shpak ran in the 2019 Ukrainian parliamentary election as the candidate of Servant of the People in Ukraine's 194th electoral district, consisting of the city of Cherkasy. She was ultimately successful, winning 41.27% of the vote compared to 11.19% of the vote by the next-closest candidate, Viktor Yevpak of Holos.

In the Verkhovna Rada (Ukraine's parliament), Shpak is a member of the Committee of the Verkhovna Rada on issues of budget. According to analytical portal Slovo i Dilo, as of March 2021 she had fulfilled 3, or 9%, of her electoral promises.
