= Oleh Arseniuk =

Ukrainian politician

- Олег Арсенюк
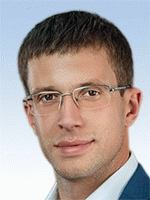
- Official portrait, 2019

People's Deputy of Ukraine
- Incumbent
- Assumed office 29 August 2019
- Preceded by: Volodymyr Zubyk
- Constituency: Cherkasy Oblast, No. 195

Personal details
- Born: 21 August 1986 (age 40) Cherkasy, Ukrainian SSR, Soviet Union (now Ukraine)
- Party: Servant of the People
- Other political affiliations: Independent; Opposition Bloc
- Education: Cherkasy National University

Oleh Oleksiiovych Arseniuk (Ukrainian: Олег Олексійович Арсенюк; born 21 August 1986) is a Ukrainian politician currently serving as a People's Deputy of Ukraine representing Ukraine's 195th electoral district from Servant of the People since 2019.

== Early life and career ==
Oleh Oleksiyovych Arseniuk was born on 21 August 1986 in the city of Cherkasy, then under the Ukrainian Soviet Socialist Republic of the Soviet Union. He is a graduate of Cherkasy National University, specialising in entrepreneurship. While still a student, he became an assistant to the head of a privately owned business.

Prior to his election, Arseniuk was commercial director at Bereh-2007 TOV, a tourism and healthcare company. He was also a member of the Association of Intellectual Sports of Ukraine, Sports Club Vulkan, and the Public Reforms non-governmental organisation.

== Political career ==
In the 2015 Ukrainian local elections, Arseniuk was a candidate for the Cherkasy City Council from Opposition Bloc. However, he was not elected.

In the 2019 Ukrainian parliamentary election, Arseniuk was the candidate of Servant of the People for People's Deputy of Ukraine from Ukraine's 195th electoral district. At the time of the election, he was an independent. He won the election, winning 41.11% of the vote. The next-closest competitor was independent Yevheniy Kurbet, who won 27.01% of the vote. In the Verkhovna Rada (Ukraine's parliament), Arseniuk joined the Servant of the People faction, as well as the Verkhovna Rada Committee on Social Policies and Veterans' Rights. He is also a member of the Cherkashchyna inter-factional association.
