= Ihor Nehulevskyi =

Ukrainian politician

- Ігор Негулевський
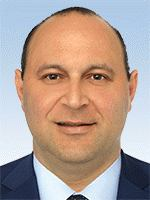
- Official portrait, 2019

People's Deputy of Ukraine
- Incumbent
- Assumed office 29 August 2019
- Preceded by: Andriy Badaturskyi
- Constituency: Mykolaiv Oblast, No. 130

Personal details
- Born: 6 December 1983 (age 42) Voznesensk, Ukrainian SSR, Soviet Union (now Ukraine)
- Party: Servant of the People
- Other political affiliations: Independent

Ihor Petrovych Nehulevskyi (Ukrainian: Ігор Петрович Негулевський; born 6 December 1983) is a Ukrainian politician currently serving as a People's Deputy of Ukraine representing Ukraine's 130th electoral district as a member of Servant of the People since 2019.

== Early life and career ==
Ihor Petrovych Nehulevskyi was born on 6 December 1983 in the city of Voznesensk in Ukraine's southern Mykolaiv Oblast. He is a graduate of the European University, specialising in finance. Prior to his election, he worked as head of the Sofiyivskyi Granite Quarry, which he also founded.

== Political career ==
During the 2019 Ukrainian parliamentary election, Nehulevskyi was the candidate of Servant of the People for People's Deputy of Ukraine in Ukraine's 130th electoral district. At the time of the election, he was an independent. He was successfully elected, winning with 38.76% of the vote against his next-closest opponent, Volodymyr Fronenko of Opposition Platform — For Life, who gathered 19.95% of the vote. The previous two People's Deputies from the 130th district also unsuccessfully contested the election, with incumbent Andriy Badaturskyi placing third with 14.32% of the vote and his predecessor Ihor Brynenko placing fourth with 14.04% of the vote.

In the Verkhovna Rada (national parliament of Ukraine), Nehulevskyi joined the Servant of the People parliamentary faction. He also joined the Verkhovna Rada Committee on Transport and Infrastructure and the South Ukraine inter-factional association. Nehulevskyi has been criticised by anti-corruption non-governmental organisation Chesno for accepting 78,000 in housing expenses from January to April 2022, during the 2022 Russian invasion of Ukraine despite his income from Sofiyivskyi Granite Quarry. Chesno also criticised him for his vote in favour of urban planning reform, which it claims takes power over post-war reconstruction away from local authorities and places them in the hands of developers.
