= Serhiy Labaziuk =

Ukrainian politician

- Сергій Лабазюк
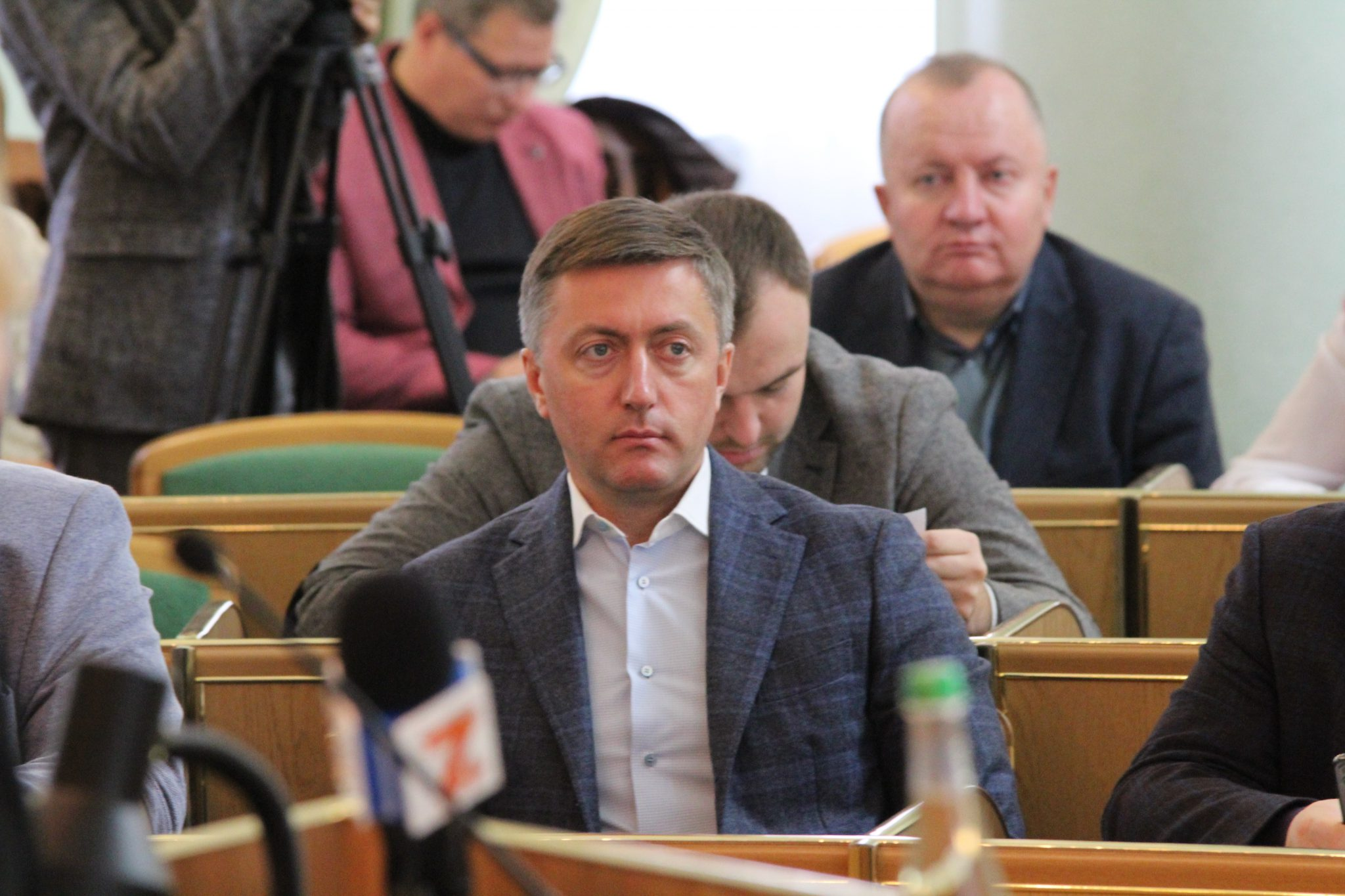
- Labaziuk in 2019

People's Deputy of Ukraine
- Incumbent
- Assumed office 12 December 2012
- Preceded by: Constituency established
- Constituency: Khmelnytskyi Oblast, No. 188

Personal details
- Born: 4 June 1980 (age 46) Volochysk, Ukrainian SSR, Soviet Union (now Ukraine)
- Party: ZM (since 2020)
- Other political affiliations: Lytvyn Bloc (2007); People's Party (2010); People's Will (2014–2019); Independent
- Education: Ternopil Institute of National Economy

Serhiy Petrovych Labaziuk (Ukrainian: Сергій Петрович Лабазюк; born 4 June 1980) is a Ukrainian politician currently serving as a People's Deputy of Ukraine since 12 December 2012 from Ukraine's 188th electoral district.

== Early life and career ==
Serhiy Petrovych Labaziuk was born in Volochysk in the Soviet Union on 4 June 1980. He graduated from the Ternopil Institute of National Economy (now the West Ukrainian National University), specialising in economic and human resource management, in 2004. In 1999, he began his career in farming, and in 2004 rented his first farm, also founding Agrarian Company 2004 LLC the same year.

== Political career ==
In 2006, Labaziuk became a member of the Volochysk City Council. The next year, he was an unsuccessful candidate for People's Deputy of Ukraine in the 2007 Ukrainian parliamentary election from the Lytvyn Bloc as the 189th party list member. In 2010, he became a member of the Khmelnytskyi Oblast Council from the People's Party.

In the 2012 Ukrainian parliamentary election, Labaziuk was a successful candidate for People's Deputy in Ukraine's 188th electoral district, winning with 28.39% of the vote. He ran as an independent. Labaziuk was subsequently re-elected in the 2014 and 2019 Ukrainian parliamentary elections with 35.81% and 49.78% of the vote, respectively.

In the 8th Ukrainian Verkhovna Rada, Labaziuk was a member of the People's Will group of People's Deputies. He joined For the Future in 2020. He is a member of the Verkhovna Rada Committee on Agricultural and Land Policies.

On 21 November 2023 the Specialized Anti-Corruption Prosecutor's Office (SAPO) and the National Anti-Corruption Bureau (NABU) reported suspicion of Labaziuk of corruption in Ukraine; claiming he had been "providing undue benefits to the Deputy Prime Minister for the Reconstruction of Ukraine, the Minister of Development of Communities, Territories and Infrastructure of Ukraine and the head of the State Agency for Reconstruction and Infrastructure Development of Ukraine." On 28 November 2023 he was detained on a court order until 21 January 2023 with the possibility of paying a bail of 40 million hryvnias. The same day Labaziuk was released on bail from the pretrial detention center.
