= Hennadiy Kasai =

Ukrainian politician

- Геннадій Касай
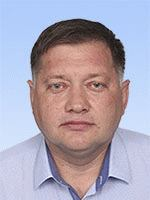
- Official portrait, 2019

People's Deputy of Ukraine
- Incumbent
- Assumed office 29 August 2019
- Preceded by: Petro Sabashuk
- Constituency: Zaporizhzhia Oblast, No. 74

Personal details
- Born: 28 November 1974 (age 51) Zaporizhzhia, Ukrainian SSR, Soviet Union (now Ukraine)
- Party: Servant of the People
- Other political affiliations: Independent; New Politics
- Education: Zaporizhzhia Polytechnic National University

Hennadiy Oleksandrovych Kasai (Ukrainian: Геннадій Олександрович Касай; born 28 November 1972) is a Ukrainian politician currently serving as a People's Deputy of Ukraine representing Ukraine's 74th electoral district as a member of Servant of the People since 2019.

== Early life and career ==
Hennadiy Oleksandrovych Kasai was born on 28 November 1972 in the southern Ukrainian city of Zaporizhzhia, then under the rule of the Soviet Union. He is a graduate of the Zaporizhzhia State Machine-Building Institute (now part of the Zaporizhzhia Polytechnic National University), specialising in lifting, construction, road machinery and equipment. He later graduated from the Zaporizhzhia National Technical University (also part of the Zaporizhzhia Polytechnic National University) with a specialisation in physical education.

From 1989 to 1990, he worked at the Zaporizhzhia-based "Motorobudivnyk" company. He later worked at Motor Sich from 2002 to 2008 as head of the mechanical workshop's production and dispatch bureau. He became deputy head of the mechanical workshop in 2008, and remained in that position for one year.

== Political career ==
In the 2015 Ukrainian local elections, Kasai was an unsuccessful candidate for the Zaporizhzhia City Council as a member of New Politics. At the time of the election, he was an independent.

Kasai was a candidate in the 2019 Ukrainian parliamentary election, this time as a candidate for People's Deputy of Ukraine in Ukraine's 74th electoral district. He was the candidate of Servant of the People, though he remained an independent. This time, he was successfully elected, defeating the next-closest candidate, Ihor Chumachenko of Opposition Bloc with 43.96% of the vote to Chumachenko's 12.63%.

In the Verkhovna Rada (national parliament of Ukraine), Kasai joined the Servant of the People faction, as well as the Verkhovna Rada Committee on National Security, Defence, and Intelligence. His 2022 vote in support of urban planning reform was criticised by anti-corruption non-governmental organisation Chesno, which described the reforms as being in favour of developers in terms of reconstruction following the 2022 Russian invasion of Ukraine.
