= Valeriy Koliukh =

Ukrainian politician

- Валерій Колюх
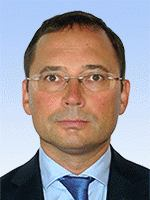
- Official portrait, 2019

People's Deputy of Ukraine
- Incumbent
- Assumed office 29 August 2019
- Preceded by: Vitaliy Hudzenko
- Constituency: Kyiv Oblast, No. 92

Personal details
- Born: 18 April 1973 (age 53) Medvyn, Ukrainian SSR, Soviet Union (now Ukraine)
- Party: Servant of the People
- Other political affiliations: Independent; Party of Regions; Batkivshchyna
- Education: Taras Shevchenko National University of Kyiv; Kyiv Law University of the National Academy of Sciences of Ukraine

Valeriy Viktorovych Koliukh (Ukrainian: Валерій Вікторович Колюх; born 18 April 1973) is a Ukrainian politician currently serving as a People's Deputy of Ukraine representing Ukraine's 92nd electoral district from Servant of the People since 29 August 2019.

== Early life and career ==
Valeriy Viktorovych Koliukh was born on 18 April 1973 in the village of Medvyn, Bila Tserkva Raion, in Ukraine's northern Kyiv Oblast. He is a graduate of the philosophical faculty of the Taras Shevchenko National University of Kyiv, specialising in political science, as well as the Kyiv Law University of the National Academy of Sciences of Ukraine, specialising in jurisprudence. He is a doctor of political science.

From 2002, Koliukh was an assistant at the political science department of Shevchenko University. He was also a professor in the political science department prior to his election.

== Political career ==
During the 2002 Ukrainian parliamentary election, Koliukh ran a campaign to become a People's Deputy of Ukraine in Ukraine's 93rd electoral district. He was not elected. He ran again in the 2014 Ukrainian parliamentary election, this time in Ukraine's 92nd electoral district. He was again unsuccessful, winning only 2.83% of the vote.

Before 2019, Koliukh worked as an assistant to Party of Regions People's Deputies Oleksandr Onyshchenko, Volodymyr Leonidovych Sivkovych, and Volodymyr Oliynyk. Anti-corruption non-governmental organisation Chesno criticised Koliukh's involvement with the former, who fled Ukraine amidst investigations into his corruption. Koliukh was also a candidate for the Kyiv City Council from Batkivshchyna, but he was not successful.

In the 2019 Ukrainian parliamentary election, Koliukh ran as the Servant of the People candidate in the 92nd electoral district. At the time of the election, he was an independent. In an election marred by dirty tactics (such as the usage of candidates with similar names in an attempt to draw votes away from the main candidates), Koliukh won the election, winning with 24.76% of the vote. In the Verkhovna Rada (Ukraine's parliament), Koliukh joined the Servant of the People faction, as well as the Verkhovna Rada Committee on Education, Science, and Innovation.
