= Oleksiy Kuznyetsov =

Ukrainian politician and businessman

- Олексій Кузнєцов
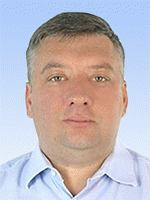

Member of the Verkhovna Rada
- Incumbent
- Assumed office 29 August 2019

Personal details
- Born: Oleksiy Oleksandrovych Kuznyetsov; 2 December 1979 (age 46) Sievierodonetsk, Ukrainian SSR, Soviet Union
- Party: Servant of the People

Oleksiy Oleksandrovych Kuznyetsov (Ukrainian: Олексій Олександрович Кузнєцов; born 2 December 1979) is a Ukrainian politician and businessman, who is currently a member of the Verkhovna Rada of the 9th convocation.

He is a member of the temporary investigative commission of the Verkhovna Rada on issues of verification and assessment of the state of the joint-stock company "Ukrainian Railways", investigation of facts of possible inaction, violation of Ukrainian legislation by the management bodies of the specified enterprise, which led to a significant deterioration of the technical condition of the enterprise and main production indicators since 27 January 2021.

== Biography ==
Oleksiy Kuznyetsov was born in Sievierodonetsk on 2 December 1979.

He graduated from the "Economics and Entrepreneurship" faculty of the Eastern Ukrainian National University named after V. Dahl. He is a PhD in economics.

Kuznyetsov is a candidate for People's Deputies from the Servant of the People party in the 2019 parliamentary elections in the electoral district No. 106, Severodonetsk, part of Kadiivka, part of Popasnyan district. At the time of the elections, he was temporarily not working, lives in Severodonetsk, and was an independent.

Kuznyetsov is a member of the Verkhovna Rada Committee on Human Rights, Deoccupation and Reintegration of Temporarily Occupied Territories in Donetsk, Luhansk Oblasts and the Autonomous Republic of Crimea, the City of Sevastopol, the National Minorities and International Relations, and was the Chairman of the Subcommittee on Rights and Freedoms of Persons Living in the Temporarily Occupied Territories of Ukraine and internally displaced persons.

On 4 August 2025, Kuznyetsov was arrested on charges related to a corruption scandal involving inflated state contracts for drones and electronic warfare equipment from 2024 to 2025.
