= Oleksii Zhmerenetskyi =

Ukrainian politician

- Олексій Жмеренецький
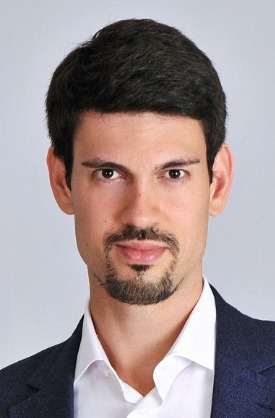

People's Deputy of Ukraine
- Incumbent
- Assumed office 29 August 2019
- Preceded by: Roman Matsola
- Constituency: Khmelnytskyi Oblast, No. 190

Personal details
- Born: 28 October 1986 (age 39) Ukhta, Komi ASSR, Russian Soviet Federative Socialist Republic, Soviet Union (now Russia)
- Party: Servant of the People
- Other political affiliations: Independent
- Education: Khmelnytskyi National University, National Academy for Public Administration

Oleksii Serhiiovych Zhmerenetskyi (Ukrainian: Олексій Сергійович Жмеренецький IPA: olekˈsʲij ʒmereˈnetsʲkɪj; born 28 October 1986) is a Ukrainian politician currently serving as a People's Deputy of Ukraine of the 9th convocation. He was elected to the Verkhovna Rada (Ukraine's parliament) from Ukraine's 190th electoral district, as the candidate of Servant of the People.

In addition to being a member of the Verkhovna Rada of Ukraine Committee on Anti-Corruption Policy, Zhmerenetskyi is also Chairman of the Subcommittee on Anti-Corruption Policy in the Sphere of Digital Innovations and Public Data, Co-chairman of the group for Inter-Parliamentary Relations with the Republic of Lebanon, Chairman of the Blockchain4Ukraine Inter-factional Parliamentary Association, and co-chairman of the Equal Opportunities Inter-Factional Parliamentary Association.

== Biography ==
Zhmerenetskyi became an assistant-consultant to the People's Deputy of Ukraine of the 6th convocation, Volodymyr Kaplienko in 2012. As a deputy director of state enterprise in the framework of National Projects, in 2013–2014, he oversaw the creation of free economic zones, industrial and technological parks.

From 2015 to 2019 he coordinated the Kolo Charitable Foundation as its deputy chairman and Coordinator.

== Political activity ==
In February 2021 in the context of Serhii Sternenko's case, he signed a statement demanding judicial reform in Ukraine.

Zhmerenetskyi was ranked 28th in the ranking of TOP-100 promising Ukrainian politicians in 2021.
