= Dmytro Kysylevskyi =

Ukrainian politician

- Дмитро Кисилевський
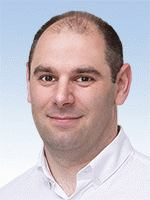
- Official portrait, 2019

People's Deputy of Ukraine
- Incumbent
- Assumed office 29 August 2019
- Preceded by: Yakiv Bezbakh
- Constituency: Dnipropetrovsk Oblast, No. 24

Personal details
- Born: 23 April 1983 (age 43) Kyiv, Ukrainian SSR, Soviet Union (now Ukraine)
- Party: Servant of the People
- Other political affiliations: Independent
- Education: Igor Sikorsky Kyiv Polytechnic Institute

Dmytro Davydovych Kysylevskyi (Ukrainian: Дмитро Давидович Кисилевський; born 23 April 1983) is a Ukrainian politician currently serving as a People's Deputy of Ukraine from Ukraine's 24th electoral district as a member of Servant of the People since 2019. He is Deputy Chairman of the Verkhovna Rada Committee on Economic Development.

== Early life and career ==
He was born on 23 April 1983, in Kyiv. In 1999, he graduated from gymnasium No. 178 and entered the Igor Sikorsky Kyiv Polytechnic Institute, graduating with a specialty in administrative management.

In 2012, he participated in the opening of the electric arc furnace complex of Interpipe Steel. He is a member of the Supervisory Board of Interpipe Novomoskovsk Pipe Plant in Novomoskovsk, Dnipro region, until 2019.

He is the organizer of the largest engineering show in Ukraine, Interpipe TechFest, initiator of a network of mechatronics laboratories in the Dnieper, co-organizer of the Interpipe Dnipro Half Marathon. He headed the volunteer headquarters of the company to help employees mobilized to the Armed Forces of Ukraine.

== Political career ==
Deputy Chairman of the Verkhovna Rada Committee on Economic Development. He specialises in industrial policy, rgw space industry, exports and foreign trade. As of December 2020, the deputy became the author of 36 draft laws and resolutions, and 180 amendments to bills.

=== 2020-2021 ===
He was one of the deputies who demanded the allocation of ₴148.5 million for the utilization and storage of rocket fuel for the PA Pivdenmash plant and the Pavlohrad Chemical Plant, as well as the allocation of ₴550 million in the 2021 budget for solid fuel utilization.

He also was among the authors of a demand that Prime Minister Denys Shmyhal disclose the risks to the Ukrainian economy from signing a free trade agreement with Turkey.

He is the author of the law on localization, which required the use of at least 10% of the Ukrainian component in the procurement of public transport, municipal equipment, railway transport, energy engineering products, and aerospace since 2022. This threshold is to be increased by 5% annually, up to 40%, and will remain in effect until 2032.
