= Halyna Vasylchenko =

Ukrainian politician

- Галина Васильченко
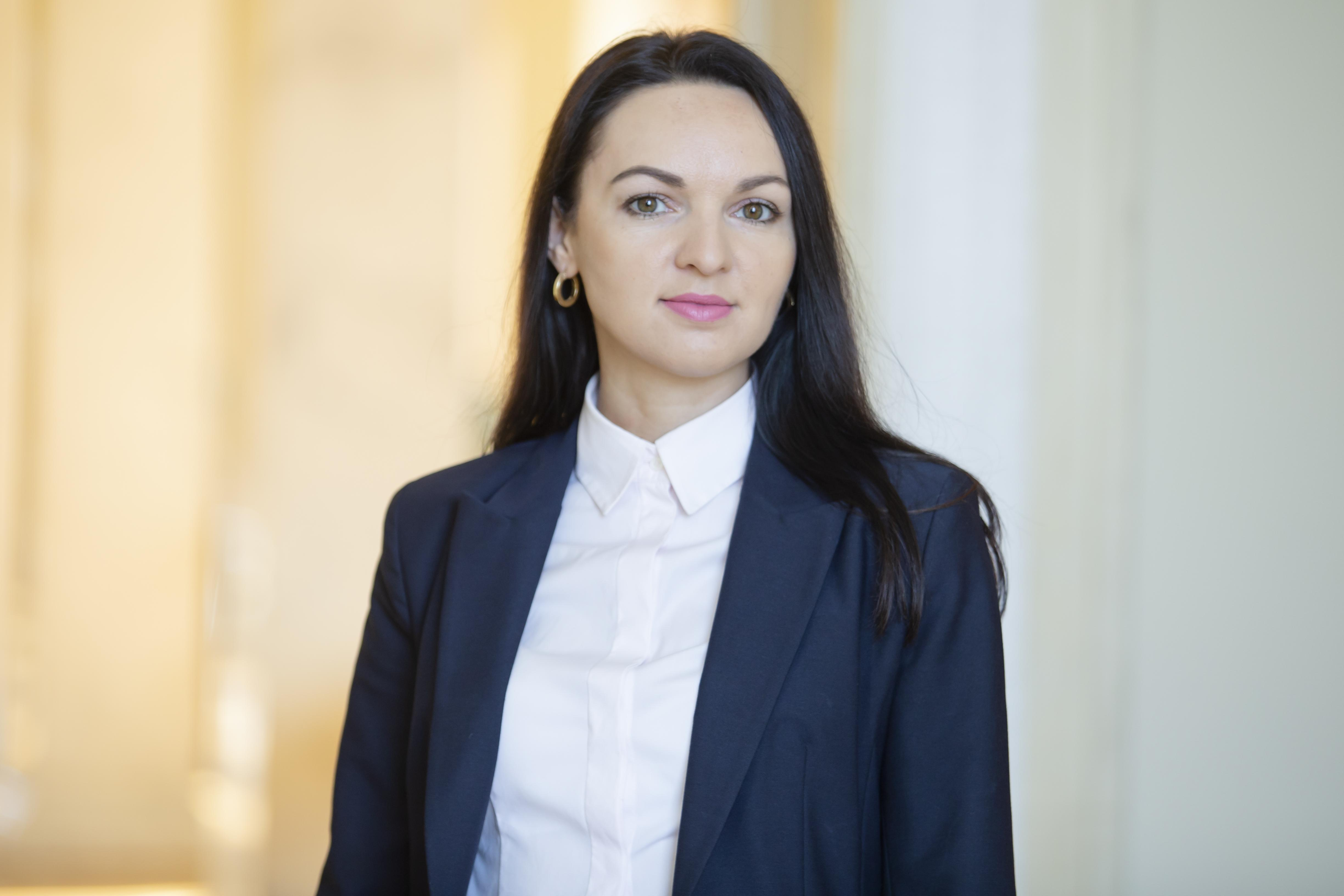
- Official portrait

People's Deputy of Ukraine
- Incumbent
- Assumed office 29 August 2019
- Preceded by: Bohdan Dubnevych
- Constituency: Lviv Oblast, No. 118

Personal details
- Born: 15 October 1983 (age 42) Lviv oblast, Ukrainian SSR, Soviet Union (now Ukraine)
- Party: Holos
- Other political affiliations: Ukrainian Galician Party
- Education: University of Lviv; Ukrainian Catholic University

Halyna Ivanivna Vasylchenko (Ukrainian: Галина Іванівна Васильченко; born 24 October 1983) is a Ukrainian political and civic activist. Member of the Verkhovna Rada of Ukraine (9th convocation). Member of the Verkhovna Rada Committee on Finance, Taxation and Customs Policy.

== Biography ==
=== Education ===
In 2001, she studied English at Premier London College.

In 2005, she graduated with a Master's degree in International Economic Relations from the Faculty of International Relations of Ivan Franko National University of Lviv.

In 2008, she obtained a law degree from the same university.

Between 2014 and 2019, she completed a number of programs at the Ukrainian Catholic University’s Lviv Business School, including "Good Governance," "Innovations Across Borders," and "Good Governance for Good Leaders," as well as the "Project Management" program at the UCU Institute of Leadership and Management.

In 2015, she completed the Advanced Political School organized by the Eidos Center.

In 2023, she completed a pre-MBA Business Analysis program at the MIM Business School.

In 2024, she graduated from the Ukrainian School of Political Studies.

=== Career ===
From 2002 to 2007, she worked as a specialist in international economic relations in the private sector.

Between 2007 and 2017, she worked in the Investment Department of the Lviv City Council, progressing from Chief Specialist to Head of the Investment Division.

Afterward, she served as Deputy Director at a private company.

=== Public and Political Activity ===
In 2015, she ran for the Lviv City Council (7th convocation) representing the Ukrainian Galician Party.

From 2014 to 2019, she was an active member of two NGOs: "Kraschyi Sykhiv" and the "Institute of International Economic Research." She authored two winning projects under the Lviv Public Budget in 2016 and 2018.

From 2017 to 2019, she led the Economic Expert Group of the Ukrainian Galician Party, where she and her team developed multiple initiatives in budget decentralization, district heating, SME development, transportation, energy efficiency, the tax system, waste management, and land reform.

In 2017, she published a practical guide titled "How to Start Your Own Business."

From 2018 to 2019, she chaired the Lviv City branch of the Ukrainian Galician Party.

In 2019, she won the parliamentary election in Electoral District No. 118 (part of Lychakivskyi and Shevchenkivskyi districts of Lviv, and Pustomyty district) as a candidate from the Holos party.

She is a member of the Verkhovna Rada Committee on Finance, Taxation, and Customs Policy.

She serves as Deputy Co-Chair of the Interparliamentary Groups for Relations with the United States, the Republic of Finland, and the Republic of Ghana.

She is a member of the Interparliamentary groups for relations with Canada, Australia, the Kingdom of Sweden, the United Kingdom, and the Federative Republic of Brazil.

She is Co-Chair of the Cross-Factional Group “Lvivshchyna,” which brings together MPs from Lviv Oblast to promote regional development.

She is also a member of the cross-factional groups “Crimean Platform,” “For Entrepreneurs (FOPs),” “Turbaza,” and “Economy NOW.”

=== Volunteer Activity ===
Since the beginning of the full-scale invasion, she has been actively involved in volunteer work, supporting Ukraine’s Defense Forces. Since 2022, she has been a co-coordinator of the Civil Awareness Center in Lviv — a project of the Serhiy Prytula Charity Foundation that aims to train civilians in basic military and security preparedness. Over 2.5 years, the Center has held about 300 training sessions, attended by more than 5,500 people.

== Key Achievements in the Verkhovna Rada of Ukraine ==
For Business:

- On January 16, 2020, her amendment to increase turnover limits for sole proprietors (FOPs) in groups I–III to UAH 1M, 5M, and 7M respectively was adopted.
- Eliminated double payment of the Unified Social Contribution for FOPs with secondary employment.
- In 2020, enabled local authorities to reduce taxes for entrepreneurs.
- In 2023, defended a moratorium on inspections of entrepreneurs for the duration of martial law.

For Communities:

- In 2019 and 2020, preserved excise tax revenues from fuel sales for local communities, helping them retain UAH 7.5 billion in 2021.
- On December 2, 2020, her draft law No. 3118 was adopted, preventing the re-registration of communal institutions, thereby safeguarding millions in local tax revenues.
- Advocated for the creation of the Sokolnyky and Obroshyne amalgamated communities and the preservation of Murovane and Pidbereztsi communities in Lviv Oblast.
- In 2021, secured an increase in local income tax revenue allocation from 60% to 64%.

For the Volunteer Sector:

- Between 2022 and 2024, facilitated customs and tax exemptions for imported defense supplies via legislative changes.
- In 2024, her amendment was adopted, exempting 19.5% personal income tax on charitable aid provided to all military personnel (previously only those with combatant status).
- In 2025, the Verkhovna Rada passed her proposal under draft law No. 12328-d, exempting in-kind aid from taxation.

Other Notable Achievements:

- In 2024, contributed to the legislative ban on the Moscow Patriarchate in Ukraine.
- In 2022, authored a resolution passed by the Verkhovna Rada calling on UNESCO to expel Russia.
- In 2024, helped pass a law strengthening control over the gambling industry.

== Personal life ==
Married, mother of two children.
