= Hope (Ukrainian political party) =

The People's Action Party "Hope" (Ukrainian: Партія Народної Дії «НАДІЯ») was founded on 18 March 2005, and has a presence in 27 regions and 525 districts of Ukraine. It is headed by Sergei Selifontiev, who created the "light parliamentary movement" in contrast to what he felt was a shady parliament of the day. On the day of its inception, 1,200,000 citizens of Ukraine joined the party.
