= Ihor Marchuk =

Ukrainian politician

- Ігор Марчук
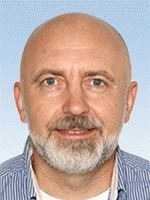
- Official portrait, 2019

People's Deputy of Ukraine
- Incumbent
- Assumed office 29 August 2019
- Constituency: Khmelnytskyi Oblast, No. 193

Personal details
- Born: 17 February 1969 (age 57) Kamianets-Podilskyi, Ukraine, Soviet Union (now Ukraine)
- Party: Servant of the People

Ihor Petrovych Marchuk (Ukrainian: Іго́р Петро́вич Марчу́к; born 17 February 1969) is a Ukrainian entrepreneur and politician currently serving as a People's Deputy of Ukraine of the 9th convocation.

== Biography ==
Born in 1969 in a working-class family. Started his working life at the ambulance station at the age of 17. At the same time studied at the medical college. Graduated from Podilia State Agrarian Technical Academy in the specialty of “Management of organizations” as a manager-economist. Held executive positions in commercial companies. In 1997 started his professional career in logistics. Founded a group of logistics companies. In 2015 founded a corporative “M&S Academy” together with the team of specialists in the field of foreign economic activity. Marchuk is a founder of a public organization “Hunting and sports club “Kampa+”.

== Parliament activity ==
A candidate for people’s deputies from the political party ‘Servant of the People’ in 2019 parliamentary elections (the electoral district № 193, Kamianets-Podilskyi, Kamianets-Podilskyi and Nova Ushytsia rayons). At the time of the election: a director of LLC “M-AND-S”, lives in Kyiv. Non-party. In 2019 was elected a People’s Deputy of Ukraine of the 9th convocation. According to the CEC, a candidate Marchuk garnered 35,58% (25 430 votes), that won him the election. 29 August 2019 took the oath of a People’s Deputy of Ukraine. A member of the parliament. Faction: Member of the "Servant of the People" political party parliamentary faction. Post: Chairperson of the Sub-committee on State-Business Interaction and Investment of the Verkhovna Rada of Ukraine Committee on Economic Development. Member of the Permanent Delegation to the Central European Initiative Parliamentary Dimension.

== Family ==
Has a wife Olena. A couple has two adult daughters.
