= Ihor Serhiyovych Vasylyev =

Ukrainian politician

Ihor Vasylyev
- Ігор Васильєв
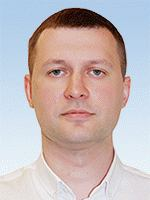

Member of the Verkhovna Rada
- Incumbent
- Assumed office 29 August 2019

Personal details
- Born: Ihor Serhiyovych Vasylyev; 25 August 1985 (age 40) Poltava, Ukraine, Soviet Union
- Party: Servant of the People

Ihor Serhiyovych Vasylyev (Ukrainian: Ігор Сергійович Васильєв) is a Ukrainian politician. In 2019, he was elected for the Servant of the People in the 9th Ukrainian Verkhovna Rada.

Born in Poltava, Ukraine, Vasylyev graduated from the Ukrainian Academy of Banking (“Banking”), Kyiv University. In 2019, he was a member of the Verkhovna Rada Committee on Digital Transformation.

Candidate for people's deputies in the party “Servant of the People” at the parliamentary elections of 2019 (electoral constituency No. 158, part of the Zarichny district in Sumy, Bilopilsky, Krasnopilsky, Sumy districts).
