= Carpathian Ukraine =

Carpathian Ukraine may refer to:

- in terms of geography, western section of Ukraine that includes several regions on both sides of the Ukrainian Carpathians
- Trans-Carpathian Ukraine, designation for a Ukrainian region beyond the Carpathian Mountains, including:
  - Trans-Carpathian Ukraine (1918-1919), short-lived unification project and claim of the West Ukrainian People's Republic
  - Trans-Carpathian Ukraine (1938-1939), an autonomous region, and in 1939 a short-lived unrecognized republic known as "Carpathian Ukraine"
  - Transcarpathian Ukraine (1944—1946), a short-lived transitional state formed in November 1944 with the assistance of the Soviet military administration after the expulsion of German and Hungarian occupation troops during the Second World War
  - Trans-Carpathian Oblast (or Zakarpattian Oblast), an administrative unit of Ukraine, covering Ukrainian Transcarpathian region
- Cis-Carpathian Ukraine (or Prykarpattia), designation for Ukrainian regions on the eastern foothills of the Ukrainian Carpathians
- Sub-Carpathian Ukraine, general designation for Ukrainian regions under the Ukrainian Carpathians, on any side of the mountain ridge
- Coat of arms of Carpathian Ukraine, coat of arms of Ukrainian Carpathian region
- Carpathian Ukraine (economic region), one of nine economic regions of modern Ukraine

== See also ==
- Ukraine (disambiguation)
- Carpathia (disambiguation)
- Carpathian (disambiguation)
- Subcarpathia (disambiguation)
- Subcarpathian (disambiguation)
- Transcarpathia (disambiguation)
- Zakarpattia (disambiguation)
