= Vladislav Poliak =

Ukrainian entrepreneur and politician (born 1975)

- Владіслав Поляк
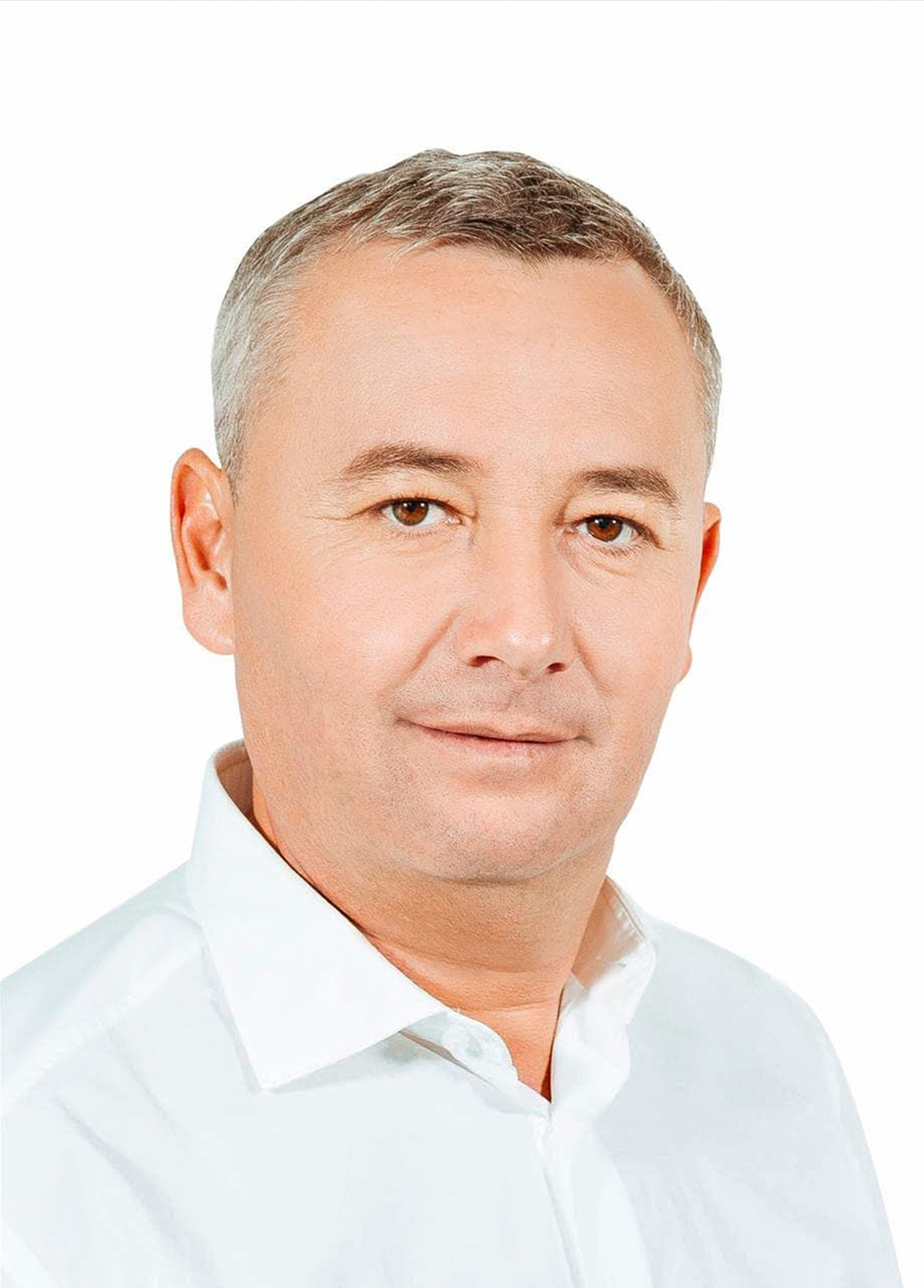

People's Deputy of Ukraine
- Incumbent
- Assumed office 29 August 2019
- Preceded by: Ivan Baloha
- Constituency: Zakarpattia Oblast, No. 73

Personal details
- Born: 10 August 1975 (age 51) Vynohradiv, Ukrainian SSR, Soviet Union (now Ukraine)
- Party: Independent
- Other political affiliations: Revival; Dovira; Native Zakarpattia
- Education: Drohobych State Pedagogical University of Ivan Franko

Vladislav Mykolaiovych Poliak (Ukrainian: Владіслав Миколайович Поляк; born 10 August 1975) is a Ukrainian entrepreneur and politician who served as a People's Deputy of Ukraine in the 9th convocation.

== Early life ==
He graduated from Vynohradiv Polytechnic College and Drohobych Ivan Franko State Pedagogical University (qualified as a manager-economist).

== Career ==
He started his career in the State Farm 'Vynohradivskyi' in 2009 as an entrepreneur.

=== Politics ===
He was a deputy of Vynohradiv City Council of the 6th convocation. He served as Deputy of Zakarpattia Oblast Council from the political party Revival.

Poliak worked as an assistant of people's deputy of Ukraine Ivan Bushko (12 December 2012 – 27 November 2014). He was a candidate for People's Deputy in the 2019 Ukrainian parliamentary election (electoral district No. 73, Berehove, Vynohradiv Raion, part of Berehove and Irshava Raions). Self-promoted. At the time of the election he was an individual entrepreneur, non-party.

In the parliamentary elections of 2019 he was elected People's Deputy. He is a member of the Dovira faction. He was a member of the Verkhovna Rada Committee on State Building, Local Governance, Regional and Urban Development. He headed various groups that worked on parliamentary relations with other countries, including: Republic of Austria, Hungary, Egypt, Montenegro, Slovak Republic, Federal Republic of Germany, and Czech Republic.

Poliak and three other Dovira faction members (Valerii Lunchenko, Robert Horvat and Vasyl Petiovka) developed the local Zakarpattia Oblast party Native Zakarpattia. This party won 12 of the 64 seats in the Zakarpattia Oblast Council during the 2020 Ukrainian local elections.

== Personal life ==
He lives in Vynohradiv, Vynohradiv Raion, Zakarpattia Oblast.

== See also ==
- Lev Zhydenko
- Oleksandr Zholobetskyi
