= Ciscarpathian =

Ciscarpathian may refer to:

- relative term, designating any region "on this side" of the Carpathians (lat. cis- / on this side), depending on a point of observation
- Ciscarpathian Romania, designation for Romanian regions "on this side" of the Carpathian Mountains, depending on a point of observation
- Ciscarpathian Ruthenia, designation for Ruthenian regions "on this side" of the Carpathian Mountains, depending on a point of observation
- Ciscarpathian Ukraine (or Prykarpattia), designation for Ukrainian regions on the north-eastern side of the Carpathian Mountains
- Vasyl Stefanyk Ciscarpathian National University, a university in the city of Ivano-Frankivsk, Ukraine

== See also ==
- Carpathia (disambiguation)
- Carpathian (disambiguation)
- Subcarpathia (disambiguation)
- Subcarpathian (disambiguation)
- Transcarpathia (disambiguation)
- Zakarpattia (disambiguation)
