= 2010 Zakarpattia Oblast local election =

Local election in Ukraine

- 31 October 2010

All 108 seats to the Zakarpattia Oblast Council 55 seats needed for a majority
- Turnout: 55.05% (▼6.43pp)
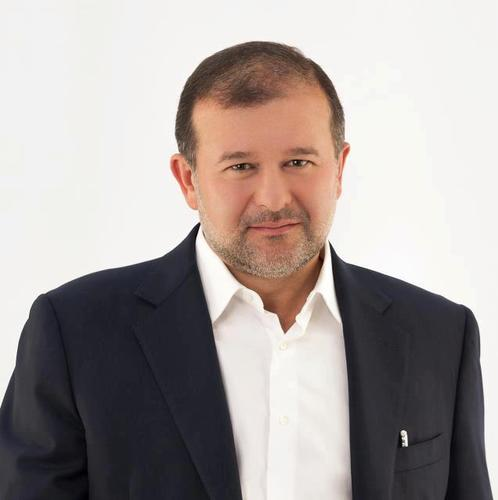

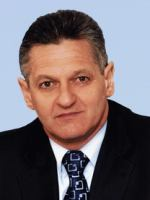

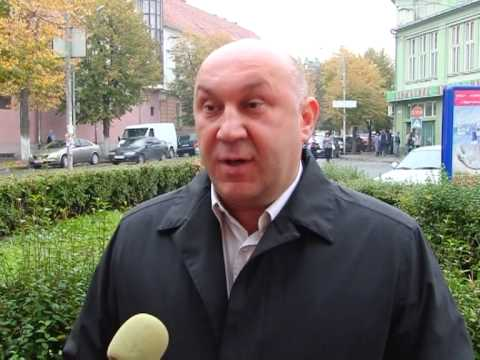

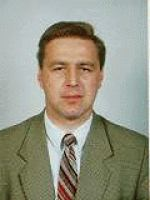

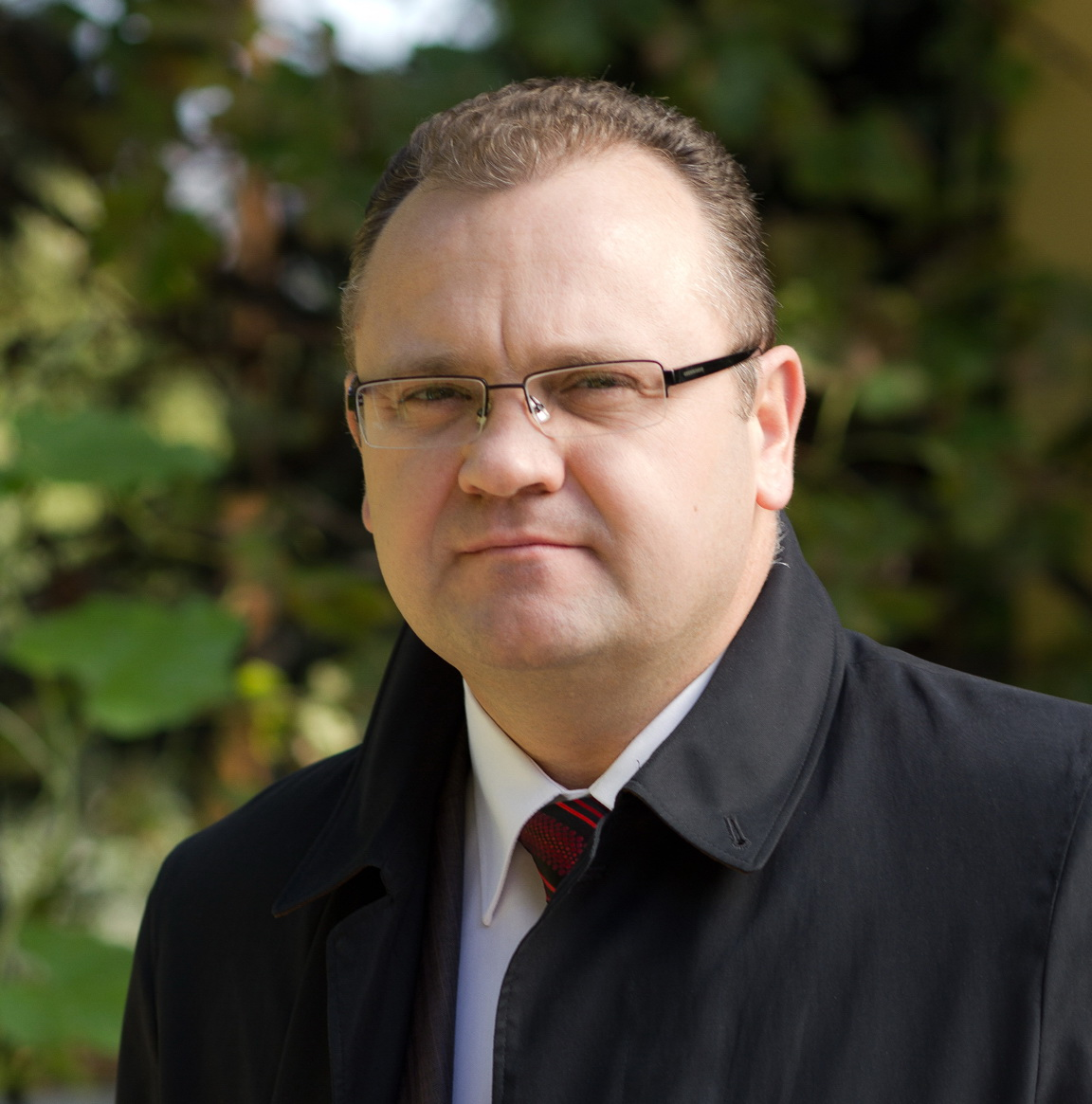
	Majority party	Minority party	Third party
Leader	Viktor Baloha	Oleksandr Ledyda	Oleksandr Kemeniash
Party	United Centre	Party of Regions	Batkivshchyna
Last election	Did not exist	11.54%, 15 seats	19.22%, 25 seats
Seats won	46	37	8
Seat change	New	▲22	▼17
Popular vote	125,956	96,193	45,400
Percentage	25.66%	19.59%	9.25%
Swing	New	▲8.05pp	▼9.97pp
	Fourth party	Fifth party	Sixth party
	FZ		SU
Leader	Robert Brovdi	Mykola Kovach	Mykhailo Popovych
Party	Front for Change	KMKSZ	Strong Ukraine
Last election	Did not exist	3.40%, 5 seats	Did not exist
Seats won	5	3	4
Seat change	New	▼2	New
Popular vote	32,215	20,456	16,477
Percentage	6.56%	4.17%	3.36%
Swing	New	▲0.77pp	New
	Seventh party	Eighth party	Ninth party
		NU	SPU
Leader	Ishtvan Haydosh	Ivan Mishko	Ivan Svystak
Party	UMDP	Our Ukraine	SPU
Last election	3.11%, 4 seats	23.08%, 30 seats	3.12%, 4 seats
Seats won	4	0	1
Seat change	0	▼30	▼3
Popular vote	15,351	13,778	3,478
Percentage	3.13%	2.81%	0.71%
Swing	▲0.02pp	▼20.27pp	▼2.41pp
Head of Council before election
Mykhailo Kichkovskyi
Our Ukraine
Elected Head of Council
Ivan Baloha
United Centre

Local elections in the Zakarpattia Oblast were held on 31 October 2010 as a part of nationwide local elections in Ukraine the same day. Newly founded United Centre of the former Head of the Secretariat of the President of Ukraine Viktor Baloha has won the election, receiving 25,7% of the vote and 46 seats in the 108-seats Oblast Council.

In Uzhhorod, despite coming second in the party-list election, United Centre won the election, with 18 seats in the City Council, followed by Party of Regions and Batkivshchyna. While the mayoral election was won by the former (2002–2006) Mayor Viktor Pohorelov, who received 33,7% of the vote, 9 points ahead of the incumbent Serhiy Ratushniak.

== Results ==
=== Oblast Council election ===
Party	Votes	%	Seats	+/–
United Centre	125,956	25.66	46	New
Party of Regions	96,193	19.59	37	+22
Batkivshchyna	45,400	9.25	8	–17
Front for Change	32,215	6.56	5	New
Party of Hungarians of Ukraine	20,456	4.17	3	–2
Strong Ukraine	16,477	3.36	4	New
Democratic Party of Hungarians of Ukraine	15,351	3.13	4	0
Our Ukraine	13,778	2.81	0	–30
Ukrainian Democratic Alliance for Reform	12,309	2.51	0	New
People's Party	7,819	1.59	0	–7
Svoboda	7,529	1.53	0	0
Greens	7,291	1.49	0	New
Communist Party of Ukraine	5,803	1.18	0	0
ECO+25%	3,647	0.74	0	0
Socialist Party of Ukraine	3,478	0.71	1	–3
Party of Greens of Ukraine	3,340	0.68	0	0
People's Labor Union of Ukraine	2,982	0.61	0	New
Christian Movement	2,862	0.58	0	0
Ukrainian People's Party	2,740	0.56	0	0
Ukrainian Party	2,691	0.55	0	0
PORA!	2,419	0.49	0	0
Social Democratic Party of Ukraine (united)	2,025	0.41	0	0
Agrarian Party of Ukraine	1,813	0.37	0	0
Motherland Defenders Party	1,723	0.35	0	0
Justice Party	1,603	0.33	0	0
Green Planet	1,340	0.27	0	0
Cossack Ukrainian Party	1,170	0.24	0	New
People's Power	980	0.20	0	New
New Power	882	0.18	0	0
New Politics	788	0.16	0	0
Truth	664	0.14	0	New
None of the above	47,222	9.62	–	–
Total	490,946	100.00	108	+18
Valid votes	490,946	94.10		
Invalid/blank votes	30,787	5.90		
Total votes	521,733	100.00		
Registered voters/turnout	947,727	55.05		
Source: ZOTEC

=== Uzhhorod City Council ===
Party	Proportional			Constituency			Total seats	+/–
Party	Votes	%	Seats	Votes	%	Seats	Total seats	+/–
Batkivshchyna	7,339	14.89	7			2	9	–10
United Centre	6,510	13.21	6			12	18	New
Party of Regions	6,006	12.19	6			9	15	+9
Front for Change	2,693	5.46	3			1	4	New
Ukrainian Democratic Alliance for Reform	2,460	4.99	2			0	2	New
ECO+25%	1,955	3.97	2			0	2	New
Party of Hungarians of Ukraine	1,736	3.52	2			0	2	+2
Strong Ukraine	1,657	3.36	2			1	3	New
People's Party			0			2	2	–6
Youth Party of Ukraine			0			1	1	0
Greens			0			1	1	–6
Ukrainian Party			0			1	1	0
Others and invalid	14,944	30.32	–			0	0	0
None of the above	3,984	8.08	–				–	–
Total	49,284	100.00	30			30	60	0
Registered voters/turnout	94,169	54.32						
Source: UZTEC

=== Uzhhorod mayoral election ===
Candidate	Party	Votes	%
Viktor Pohorelov	ECO+25%	16,265	33.00
Serhiy Ratushniak	Independent	11,956	24.26
Volodymyr Prykhodko	Party of Regions	6,655	13.50
Mykola Zholtani	Youth Party of Ukraine	4,211	8.54
Others and invalid		5,298	10.75
None of the above		4,899	9.94
Total		49,284	100.00
Registered voters/turnout		94,169	54.32
Source: UZTEC
