= Valerii Lunchenko =

Ukrainian politician

- Валерій Лунченко
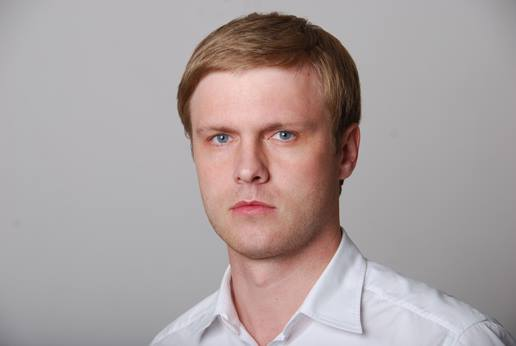
- Lunchenko in 2017

People's Deputy of Ukraine
- Incumbent
- Assumed office 27 November 2014
- Preceded by: Pavlo Baloha (2019)
- Constituency: People's Front, No. 19 (2014–2019); Zakarpattia Oblast, No. 71 (since 2019)
- In office 12 December 2012 – 2 March 2014
- Constituency: Batkivshchyna, No. 61

11th Governor of Zakarpattia Oblast
- In office 2 March 2014 – 15 September 2014
- Preceded by: Oleksandr Ledyda
- Succeeded by: Vasyl Hubal

Personal details
- Born: 13 October 1982 (age 43) Khust, Ukrainian SSR, Soviet Union (now Ukraine)
- Party: Independent
- Other political affiliations: Batkivshchyna (2012–2014); People's Front (2014–2019); Dovira (since 2019); Native Zakarpattia
- Education: Drohobych State Pedagogical University of Ivan Franko

Valerii Valeriiovych Lunchenko (Ukrainian: Валерій Валерійович Лунченко; born 13 October 1982) is a Ukrainian politician, who has served as a People's Deputy of Ukraine since 2014, previously serving from 2012 to 2014.

== Education ==
- In 2003 — graduated from Drohobych State Pedagogical University of Ivan Franko where he got a diploma of a manager-marketer.
- In 2004 — graduated from Hungarian National Institute (Nyíregyháza, Hungary), specialty “Private Entrepreneurship”.
- In 2006 — graduated from Kharkiv National Auto-Road University, specialty «Automobiles and Automobile Industry», got a Degree of the Master-researcher with Honors.

== Work Activity ==
- 2007–2010 — Logistics specialist at a private enterprise.
- Since December 2010 — The Chief of administration of Khust City Executive Committee. Since July, 2009, - a chairman of Khust City Department of public organization «Front of Change», and in December, 2009, was elected a Chairperson of Khust city organization of political party «Front of Change».
- 31 October 2010 — was elected a Deputy of Zakarpattia Regional Council from party «Front of Change».
- During the parliamentary elections of 2012 he was elected a People's Deputy of Ukraine of the VIIth elections from All Ukrainian Unity Fatherland, No. 61 in the list. A member of Verkhovna Rada of Ukraine on the questions of agricultural policy and land matters.
- 2 March 2014 – 15 September 2014 — a chairman of Zakarpattia Oblast State Administration. At the special elections to the Verkhovna Rada in 2014 he was elected a People's Deputy of Ukraine in the 8th convocation in accordance with the party list (No. 19 in the list) from People's Front.
- A member of the People's Front.
- Position — Secretary of the Verkhovna Rada of Ukraine Committee on Agrarian Policy and Land Relations.

In the 2019 Ukrainian parliamentary election Lunchenko was reelected as an independent candidate in constituency 71 (in Zakarpatia Oblast). He won this election with 49.14% of the votes. In parliament he joined the Dovira faction.

Lunchenko and three other Dovira faction members (Vasyl Petiovka, Robert Horvat and Vladislav Poliak) founded the local Zakarpattia Oblast party Native Zakarpattia. This party won 12 of the 64 seats in the Zakarpattia Oblast Council during the 2020 Ukrainian local elections.

== Family ==
He is married and has two daughters.
