= Vasyl Petiovka =

Ukrainian politician

- Василь Петьовка
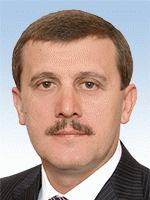
- Official portrait, 2019

People's Deputy of Ukraine
- Incumbent
- Assumed office 30 September 2007
- Preceded by: Constituency established
- Constituency: NUNS, No. 60 (2007–2012); Zakarpattia Oblast, No. 72 (since 2012)

Mayor of Mukachevo
- In office 2003–2007
- Preceded by: Zoltán Lengyel
- Succeeded by: Oleh Havashi

Personal details
- Born: 30 January 1967 (age 59) Zavydovo, Ukrainian SSR, Soviet Union
- Party: Dovira (since 2019)
- Other political affiliations: NUNS (2007–2012); United Centre (2012–2014); People’s Will (2014–2019); Independent
- Education: Odesa I. I. Mechnikov National University

Vasyl Vasyliovych Petiovka (Ukrainian: Васи́ль Васи́льович Петьо́вка; born 30 January 1967) is a Ukrainian politician currently serving as a People's Deputy of Ukraine since 12 December 2012.

== Early life and career ==
Vasyl Petiovka was born on 30 January 1967, in the village of Zavydovo, within what was then the Ukrainian Soviet Socialist Republic. In 1985 he graduated from Mukachevo cooperative technical school with the specialization as stock and sales manager of groceries and industrial goods. From 1985 to 1987 he had a compulsory military service. He got education at Mukachevo Technological Institute at the Faculty of Engineering and Economics. In 2006 he graduated from Odesa I. I. Mechnikov National University, with a specialization in accounting and audit.

From 1985, Petiovka worked at Verhniokoropetz consumers enterprise of Mukachevo Region consumer's association. After 1987, he worked at Mukachevo cooperative technical school, the Latorytzia company, and Rei-Promin LLC. From April 1997, he worked at Barva LLC, becoming head of the board of directors in April 1998.

== Political career ==
In 2002, he was elected a deputy of the 4th convocation of the Zakarpattia Oblast Council. From 2002 to 2003, he served as a member of the executive Mukachevo City Council of Zakarpattia Oblast. From 2003 to 2007 he was mayor of Mukachevo. His 2003 election was followed by a long legal battle with Ernest Nuser, who had also claimed victory in the election and was supported by the Social Democratic Party of Ukraine (united).

In the 2006 Ukrainian parliamentary election, Petiovka was a candidate for People's Deputy of Ukraine from Our Ukraine Bloc (NUNS), as No. 224 on the party list, but was unsuccessful. In the 2007 Ukrainian parliamentary election, he ran again as a member of NUNS, this time as No. 60 on the party list. This time, Petiovka was elected, and served as a member of the Verkhovna Rada Financial Committee.

In the 2012 Ukrainian parliamentary election, he was re-elected as a People's Deputy, this time in Ukraine's 72nd electoral district as a candidate of United Centre. In the 2014 Ukrainian parliamentary election, he was re-elected as deputy from the 72nd electoral district, and joined the People's Will group. As a consequence, he was expelled from United Centre.

Vasyl Petiovka is a member of the Committee of the Verkhovna Rada on agricultural policy and land matters. He is also a member of the interparliamentary committee with South Korea. In the 2019 Ukrainian parliamentary election he was re-elected as an independent candidate from the 72nd electoral district, and became a member of Dovira.

Petiovka and three other Dovira faction members (Valerii Lunchenko, Robert Horvat and Vladislav Poliak) developed the local Zakarpattia Oblast party Native Zakarpattia. This part won 12 of the 64 seats in the Zakarpattia Oblast Council during the 2020 Ukrainian local elections.

== Family ==
Petiovka has a wife, named Maryna, and two sons. He is a cousin of Viktor Baloha, who is also a member of the Verkhovna Rada.

== Awards ==
- Order of Merit (Ukraine) 3rd Class (08.2005)
- Order of Merit (Ukraine) 2nd Class (07.2012)
- Order of Ukrainian Orthodox Church of Patriarchate of Moscow of Knight Volodymyr
