= Zakarpattia =

Zakarpattia may refer to:

- Zakarpattia Oblast, an administrative region of modern Ukraine, on the inner side of the Carpathians
  - Zakarpattia Oblast Council, regional assembly of Zakarpattia Oblast
  - Administrative divisions of Zakarpattia Oblast, sub-regional units of Zakarpattia Oblast
  - 1991 Zakarpattia general regional referendum, a regional referendum in Zakarpattia Oblast, held in 1991
  - 2006 Zakarpattia Oblast local election, regional elections for the Council of Zakarpattia Oblast, in 2006
  - 2010 Zakarpattia Oblast local election, regional elections for the Council of Zakarpattia Oblast, in 2010
- Zakarpattia (historical region), in East Slavic terminology, a wider region on the inner side of the Carpathian Mountains, centered around the territory of modern Zakarpattia Oblast (Ukraine), and also known in English under several terms, that are usually coined from adjectives like "trans-Carpathian" or "sub-Carpathian", attached to specific terms like Rus' or Ruthenia, and also Ukraine.
  - Zakarpattia (1918-1919), historical region of Zakarpattia during the transitional post-war period, from 1918 to 1919
  - Zakarpattia (1919-1938), historical region of Zakarpattia within the First Czechoslovak Republic, from 1919 to 1938
  - Zakarpattia (1938-1939), historical region of Zakarpattia within the Second Czechoslovak Republic, from 1938 to 1939
  - Zakarpattia (1939-1945), historical region of Zakarpattia after the annexation by Hungary in 1939
- Zakarpattia Regional Committee of the Communist Party of Ukraine, created de facto in 1944, and de jure in 1946
- FC Zakarpattia Uzhhorod, former name of the FC Hoverla Uzhhorod (Ukraine)
- FC Zakarpattia-2 Uzhhorod, second-league team of the FC Zakarpattia (Ukraine)
- Zakarpattia Lowland, a plain in southwestern parts of Zakarpattia Oblast

== See also ==
- Transcarpathia (disambiguation)
- Subcarpathia (disambiguation)
- Carpathia (disambiguation)
