= Subcarpathian =

Subcarpathian may refer to:

- someone or something related to geographical region of Outer Subcarpathia
  - Subcarpathian Voivodship, an administrative region in modern Poland
  - Subcarpathian Regional Assembly, a regional assembly of the Subcarpathian Voivodship (Poland)
  - Subcarpathian constituency (European Parliament), an EP electoral constituency in Poland
  - Prykarpattia, a section of outer-subcarpathian region in modern Ukraine
  - Bukovinian Subcarpathia, a section of outer-subcarpathians in the region of Bukovina
  - Moldavian Subcarpathia, a section of outer-subcarpathians in the region of Moldavia
- someone or something related to geographical region of Inner Subcarpathia
  - Subcarpathian Rus', an historical and geographical region
  - Region of Subcarpathia (1919-1938), an administrative region of the First Czechoslovak Republic
  - Autonomous Subcarpathian Rus' (1938-1939), an autonomous region of the Second Czechoslovak Republic
  - Social Democratic Workers' Party in Subcarpathian Rus', a former regional political party
  - International Socialist Party of Subcarpathian Rus', a former regional political party
  - Subcarpathian Reformed Church, a Christian denomination

== See also ==
- Subcarpathia (disambiguation)
- Carpathia (disambiguation)
- Carpathian (disambiguation)
- Ciscarpathian (disambiguation)
- Transcarpathia (disambiguation)
- Zakarpattia (disambiguation)
