= Zavidovo (disambiguation) =

Zavidovo is a village (selo) in Tver Oblast, Russia; official residence place for the President of Russia.

Zavidovo may also refer to:

- Zavidovo, Ryazan Oblast, a village (selo) in Ryazan Oblast, Russia
- Zavidovo railway station, a railway station of the Oktyabrskaya Railway, Russia
- Zavydovo, a village in Zakarpattia Oblast, Ukraine
