= Denys Maliuska =

Ukrainian lawyer, businessman and politician

- Денис Малюська
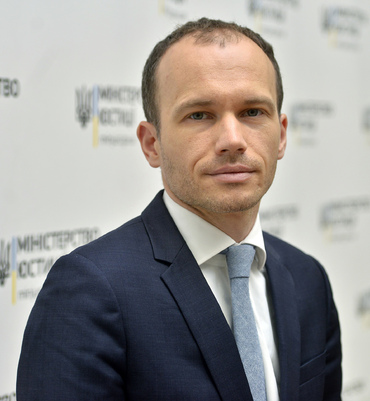
- Maliuska in 2019

Minister of Justice
- In office 29 August 2019 – 4 September 2024
- President: Volodymyr Zelenskyy
- Prime Minister: Oleksiy Honcharuk; Denys Shmyhal
- Preceded by: Pavlo Petrenko
- Succeeded by: Olha Stefanishyna

People's Deputy of Ukraine
- In office 29 August 2019 – 29 August 2019

Personal details
- Born: 19 November 1981 (age 44) Dunaivtsi, Ukrainian SSR, Soviet Union (now Ukraine)
- Party: Servant of the People
- Education: Taras Shevchenko National University of Kyiv; University of London
- Occupation: Lawyer businessman politician

Denys Leontiyovych Maliuska (Ukrainian: Денис Леонтійович Малюська; born 19 November 1981) is a Ukrainian lawyer, businessman and politician. From 29 August 2019 to 4 September 2024, he was Minister of Justice of Ukraine.

== Biography ==
Maliuska studied law at the Taras Shevchenko National University of Kyiv (2004). He also graduated from the University of London (2016). Master of Laws.

From 2000 to 2010, Maliuska worked as a lawyer at the law firm Business Law. From 2010 to 2019, he served as a private sector consultant for the World Bank Group.

Deputy Chairman of the Board of BRDO/World Bank Group.

He was on a party list of the Servant of the People political party during the 2019 parliamentary elections, yet himself is not a registered member of the party (non-partisan, according to the Central Election Commission). Maliuska was elected to the Verkhovna Rada in 2019. He surrendered his deputy mandate upon his ministerial appointment on 29 August 2019.

On 29 August 2019, Maliuska was appointed as the Minister of Justice of Ukraine in the Honcharuk Government. In the 4 March 2020, appointed Shmyhal Government he kept this post. In September 2021, Minister of Justice Malyuska appointed Ivan Lishchyna as his advisor.

Iryna Mudra and Andriy Haichenko were among of his deputies.

On September 3, 2024, he submitted his resignation to the Verkhovna Rada (Ukraine's national parliament). In addition to Malyuska, the Minister of Environmental Protection and Natural Resources Ruslan Strilets and the Minister of Strategic Industries Oleksandr Kamyshin submitted their resignations.

On September 4, 2024, the Verkhovna Rada of Ukraine supported the dismissal of Malyuska from the post of Minister of Justice of Ukraine.

== See also ==
- Honcharuk Government
- List of members of the parliament of Ukraine, 2019–24
