= Hubal (disambiguation) =

Hubal was a god worshipped in pre-Islamic Arabia.

Hubal may also refer to:

- Henryk Dobrzanski, a Polish soldier who used the pseudonym "Hubal"
- Hubal (film), a 1973 Polish historical film
- Vasyl Hubal (born 1967), Ukrainian politician
