= Myroslav Biletskyi =

Ukrainian politician

- Мирослав Білецький
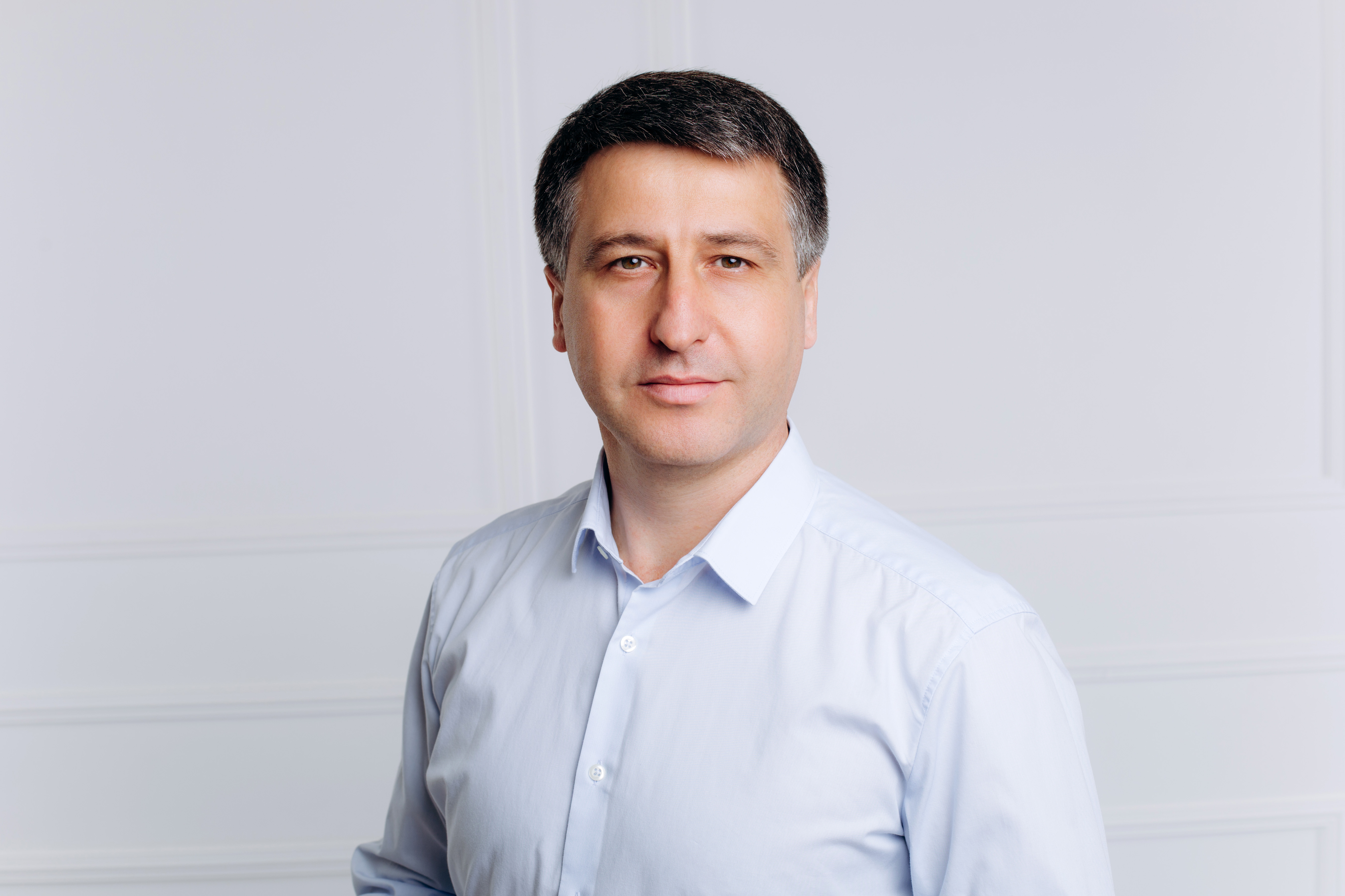
- Biletksyi in 2020

Governor of Zakarpattia Oblast
- Incumbent
- Assumed office 8 September 2024; Acting: 8 March – 8 September 2024
- President: Volodymyr Zelenskyy
- Preceded by: Viktor Mykyta

First Deputy Head of the Zakarpattia Oblast State Administration
- In office November 2021 – 8 March 2024

Member of the Zakarpattia Oblast Council
- In office 2010 – November 2021

Personal details
- Born: 11 January 1976 (age 50) Rokosovo, Zakarpattia Oblast, Ukrainian SSR, Soviet Union
- Party: Native Zakarpattia (since 2020)
- Other political affiliations: Ukrainian Strategy of Groysman

Myroslav Zoltanovych Biletskyi (Ukrainian: Мирослав Золтанович Білецький; born 11 January 1976) is a Ukrainian politician who is currently the governor of Zakarpattia Oblast Council since 8 September 2024.

He also served as the First Deputy Head of the Zakarpattia Oblast State Administration from 2021 to 2024.

He also had served as the Member of the Zakarparttia Oblast Council from 2010 to 2021.

== Biography ==
Myroslav Biletskyi was born on 11 January 1976 in Rokosovo, Khust district, Zakarparttia Oblast.

He graduated from the National University "Lviv Polytechnic" with a specialty "Economics of the enterprise", qualification-mechanical engineer.

In 2010, Biletskyi was elected as a member of the Zakarpattia Oblast Council.

He ran as a candidate to the Verkhovna Rada of the IX convocation in the early 2019 elections from the political party "Ukrainian Groysman Strategy" under No. 16 in the party list.

In the 2020 local elections, he scored a record among all elected deputies, the number of votes: 6668, which was 115% of the quota. He was reelected in the same year as a member of the Zakarpattia Oblast Council of the VIII convocation from the Transcarpathian regional organization of the political party "Native Transcarpathia".

He is the authorized person to be in the "Native Transcarpathia" faction.

From since November 2021, he was a member of the Permanent Commission of the Regional Council on Budget. At the same month, he became the First Deputy Head of the Zakarpattia Oblast State Administration.

On 8 March 2024, Biletskyi became the acting governor of Zakarpattia Oblast. He formally took office on 8 September.

== Personal life ==
Biletsky promotes a healthy lifestyle, as he is a participant and co-organizer of half-marathons in Transcarpathia.
