= Robert Horvat =

Ukrainian politician

- Роберт Горват
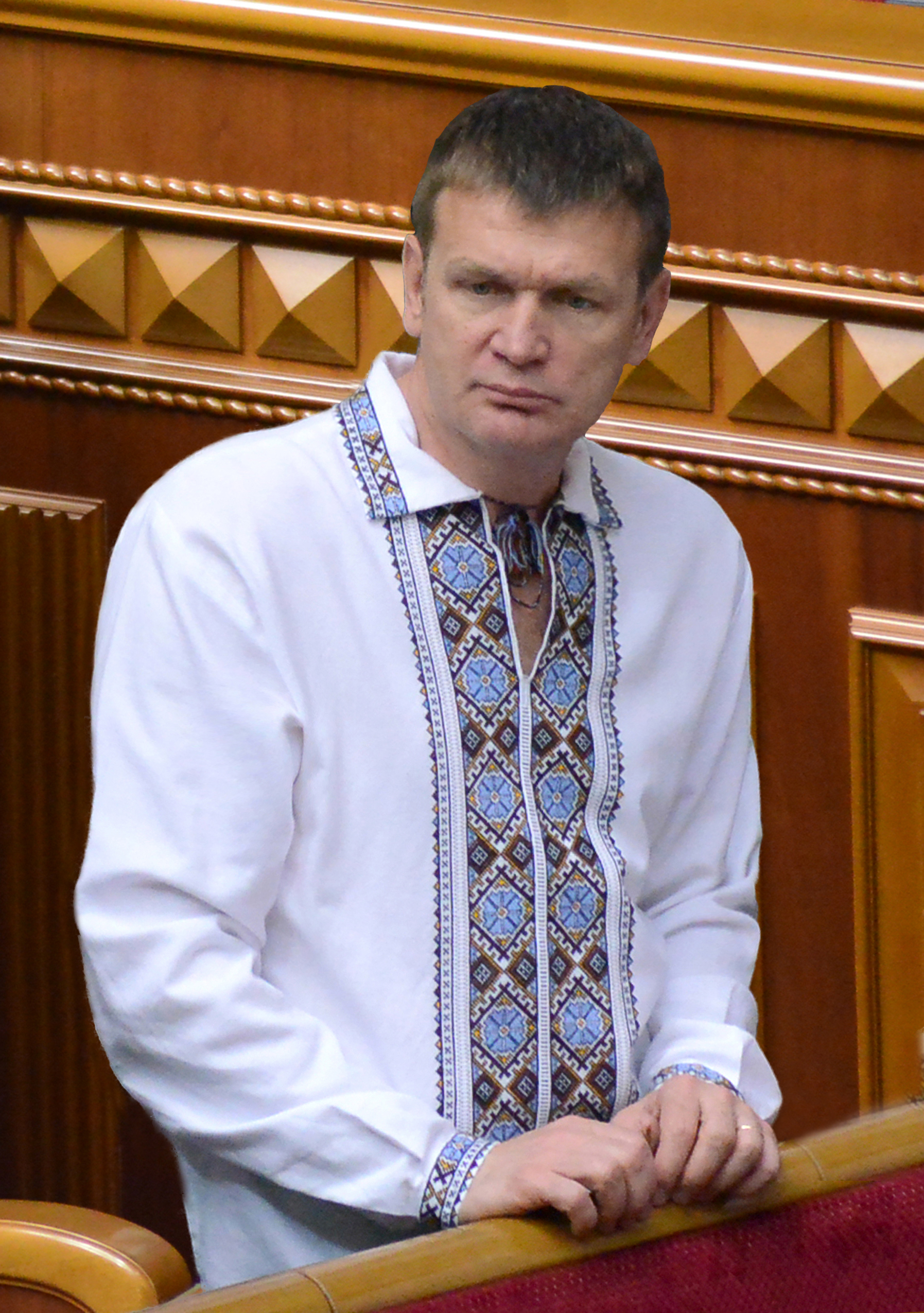
- Horvat in 2016

People's Deputy of Ukraine
- Incumbent
- Assumed office 27 November 2014
- Preceded by: Vasyl Kovach
- Constituency: Zakarpattia Oblast, No. 68

Personal details
- Born: 17 February 1969 (age 57) Turi Remety, Ukrainian SSR, Soviet Union (now Ukraine)
- Party: Independent
- Other political affiliations: Petro Poroshenko Bloc (2014–2019); Dovira (since 2019); Native Zakarpattia
- Education: Kyiv National University of Trade and Economics

Robert Ivanovych Horvat (Ukrainian: Роберт Іванович Горват; born 17 February 1969) is a Ukrainian politician currently serving as a People's Deputy of Ukraine from Ukraine's 68th electoral district since 2014. A member of Dovira, Horvat is chairman of the Subcommittee on Legal Support of Customs Bodies of the Verkhovna Rada Committee on Finance, Tax, and Customs Policy. He is also co-chair of the group for inter-parliamentary relations with the Czech Republic and head of the group for inter-parliamentary relations with Egypt.

== Education ==
In 2009, Horvat graduated from the Uzhhorod Training Center of Kyiv National University of Trade and Economics and received a full higher education in "Accounting and Auditing".

== Political career ==
A member of the Dovira parliamentary group, Horvat was previously a member of the Petro Poroshenko Bloc faction.

Horvat and three other Dovira faction members (Valerii Lunchenko, Vasyl Petiovka and Vladislav Poliak) founded the local Zakarpattia Oblast party Native Zakarpattia. This party won 12 of the 64 seats in the Zakarpattia Oblast Council during the 2020 Ukrainian local elections.

In 2016-2019, Horvat developed a scheme to seize 323 hectares of land used by a state-owned enterprise, causing the state losses of UAH 123 million. In November 2023, the High Anti-Corruption Court imposed a pre-trial restraint on Horvat with bail set at UAH 27 million.
