= Pavlo Kostenko =

Ukrainian politician

Pavlo Kostenko Павло Костенко
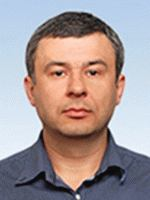
- In office 27 November 2014 – 29 August 2019

Personal details
- Born: 9 October 1976 (age 49) Drohobych, Lviv Oblast
- Party: Samopomich Union
- Education: Drohobych State Pedagogical University

Pavlo Petrovych Kostenko (born 9 October 1976) is a Ukrainian politician and civic activist, member of Parliament of Ukraine of 8th convocation, and member of the Parliamentary faction Samopomich Union.

Kostenko again took part in the July 2019 Ukrainian parliamentary election for Samopomich on its national election list. But in the election the party won 1 seat (in one of the electoral constituencies) while only securing 0.62% of the national (election list) vote.

== Biography ==
Kostenko was born in Drohobych, Lviv Oblast, Ukraine. He graduated from the Drohobych State Pedagogical University in 2000, with a specialist degree in organisation management, pedagogics and methods of education and basics of informatics.

Kostenko started career in 2000, filling the position of head of the marketing department in TruskavetsInvest. Since 2001 worked in engineering as head of marketing and trade department. In 2003-2009 held the position of deputy director at UKO Ukraine, in 2009-2012 director at the Instrumental Centre. From 2012 he served as the director of Profix Ukraine. In 2013 he co-founded the NGO Initiative of the Free and Responsible VOLA.

Kostenko is married and has two children.
