= Ihor Kopytin =

Ukrainian politician

- Ігор Копитін
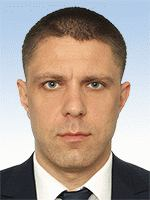
- Official portrait, 2019

People's Deputy of Ukraine
- Incumbent
- Assumed office 29 August 2019
- Preceded by: Oleksandr Zholobetskyi
- Constituency: Mykolaiv Oblast, No. 129

Personal details
- Born: February 12, 1981 (age 45) Legnica, Poland
- Party: Servant of the People
- Other political affiliations: Independent
- Education: Odesa University

Ihor Volodymyrovych Kopytin (Ukrainian: Ігор Володимирович Копитін; born 12 February 1981) is a Ukrainian politician currently serving as a People's Deputy of Ukraine representing Ukraine's 129th electoral district as a member of Servant of the People since 2019.

== Early life and career ==
Ihor Volodymyrovych Kopytin was born on 12 February 1981 in the city of Legnica in southwestern Poland, then under the rule of the Polish People's Republic. He is a graduate of Odesa University, specialising in jurisprudence. From 2009, he worked in the sale and maintenance of aeroplanes and helicopters, as well as training pilots. He previously served as head of several IT startups. Prior to his election, Kopytin was also the head of the international spare parts exchange at Avtomodern TOV, as well as a European Champion in hand-to-hand combat in 2009.

== Political career ==
During the 2019 Ukrainian parliamentary election, Kopytin was the candidate of Servant of the People for the office of People's Deputy of Ukraine in Ukraine's 129th electoral district, located in Ukraine's southern Mykolaiv Oblast. At the time of the election, he was an independent. He was successfully elected, winning the election with 38.28% of the vote. In second place was incumbent People's Deputy Oleksandr Zholobetskyi (running as an independent), who gathered 16.02% of the vote.

In the Verkhovna Rada (Ukrainian parliament), Kopytin joined the Servant of the People faction, as well as the Verkhovna Rada Committee on National Security, Defence, and Intelligence. In 2022, Kopytin was criticised by anti-corruption non-governmental organisation Chesno for his vote in favour of urban planning reform, which Chesno claimed would place reconstruction of Ukraine following the Russo-Ukrainian War in the hands of developers, rather than ordinary people.
