= Andriy Smyrnov =

Ukrainian jurist and statesman

- Андрій Олександрович Смирнов
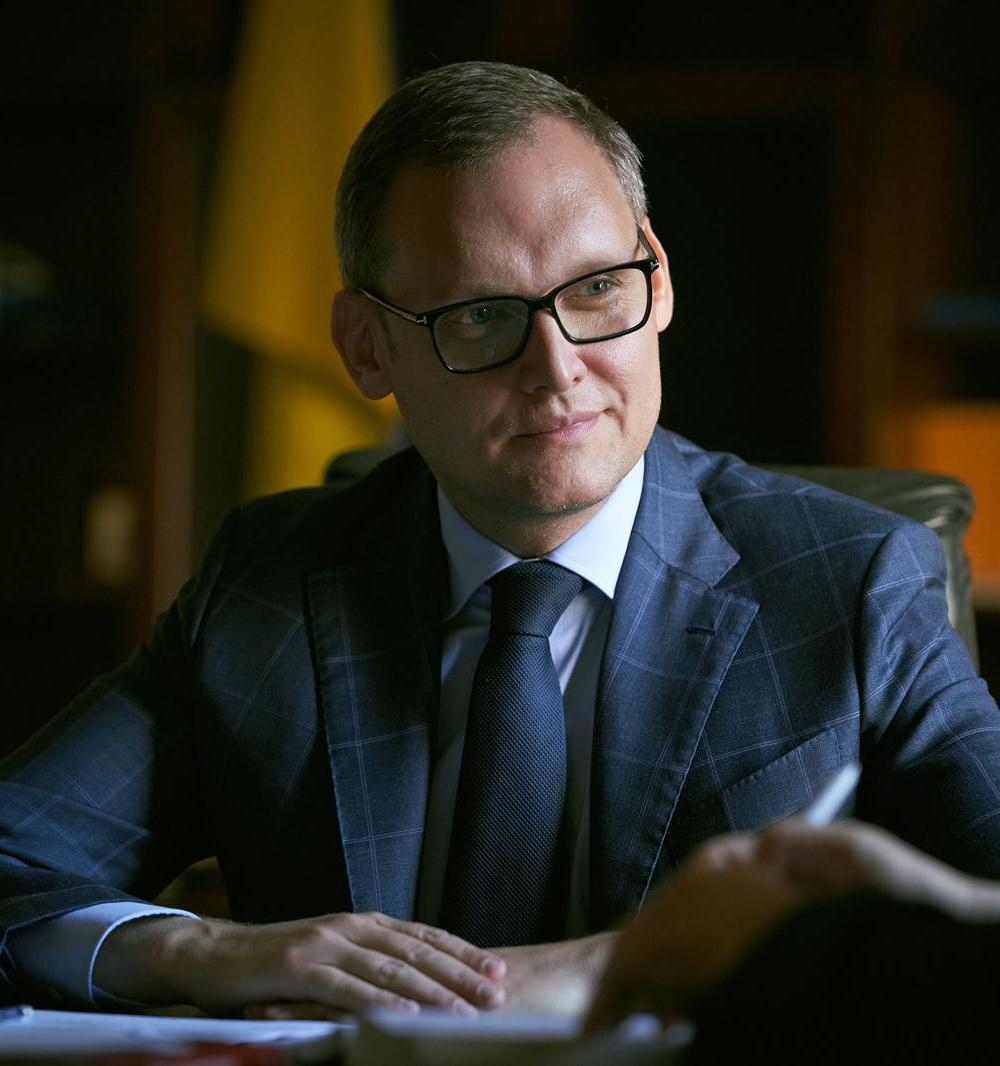

Deputy Head of the Office of the President of Ukraine
- In office September 10, 2019 – March 29, 2024
- President: Volodymyr Zelenskyy

Personal details
- Born: 20 January 1981 (age 45) Kyiv, Ukrainian SSR
- Education: National University of Kyiv-Mohyla Academy
- Occupation: jurist, statesman

Andriy Smyrnov (Ukrainian: Андрій Олександрович Смирнов; born 20 January 1981, Kyiv) is a Ukrainian statesman and jurist. He was the Deputy Head of the Office of the President of Ukraine from September 2019 until March 2024.

== Early life ==
In 2003, he graduated from the Law Faculty of the National University of Kyiv-Mohyla Academy. Specialist in the field of law. Worked in state and local government.

Andriy Smyrnov was the Head of the Legal Department of the State Committee for the State Material Reserve, the deputy director of the Economic Support Department of the Security Service of Ukraine, and the Head of the Land Resources Department of Zaporizhzhia.

Since 2012, he has been a member of the supervisory board of the State Banking Institution Ukrainian Bank for Reconstruction and Development.

== Political activity ==
He was an assistant to MPs Valeriy Karpuntsov (7th convocation) and Andriy Denysenko (8th convocation).

In 2014, he was a candidate for the People's Deputy of Ukraine in constituency 49 (Donetsk Oblast) as a self-nominated candidate.

In the 2015 Ukrainian local elections, Andriy Smyrnov ran for the Dnipropetrovsk Oblast Council from the UKROP party and was elected. In December 2015, he headed the Regional Council's Standing Committee on Communal Property, Housing and Utilities.

On September 10, 2019, he became the Deputy Head of the Office of the President of Ukraine, where he deals with legal policy, law enforcement and judicial systems. He was fired on March 29, 2024 and replaced by Iryna Mudra. He is a member of the National Council on Anti-Corruption Policy (since June 1, 2020).

== Recognition ==
In December 2021, Smyrnov took 23rd place in the top 100 most influential people of Ukraine, according to Focus magazine.

== Accusation of corruption ==
On 22 May 2024, the National Anti-Corruption Bureau of Ukraine charged Smyrnov on the basis of having acquired property for an amount of about $400,000 that according to his official's declared savings and official income could not have afforded. On 28 May 2024 his bail was set for 10 million hryvnias. The next day the bail was paid.
