= Subcarpathia =

Subcarpathia may refer to:

- geographical region of Outer Subcarpathia
  - Subcarpathian Voivodeship, a section of the Outer Subcarpathian region in Poland
  - Prykarpattia or Ciscarpathia, a section of the Outer Subcarpathian region in Ukraine
  - Bukovinian Subcarpathians, a section of the Outer Subcarpathian region in Bukovina
  - Moldavian Subcarpathians, a section of the Outer Subcarpathian region in Moldavia
- Divisions of the Carpathians#Inner Eastern Carpathians (subprovince)
  - Transcarpathia#Subcarpathian Rus' (1928–1938) for an administrative region in the First Czechoslovak Republic
  - Carpatho-Ukraine#Political autonomy for an autonomous region in the Second Czechoslovak Republic
  - Carpathian Ruthenia during World War II, a civil administration established after the annexation by Hungary in 1939

== See also ==
- Subcarpathian (disambiguation)
- Carpathian (disambiguation)
- Carpathia (disambiguation)
- Ciscarpathian (disambiguation)
- Transcarpathia (disambiguation)
- Zakarpattia (disambiguation)
