= 2006 Zakarpattia Oblast local election =

Local election in Ukraine

- March 26, 2006

All 90 seats to the Zakarpattia Oblast Council
| | Majority party | Minority party | Third party |
|---|---|---|---|
| Party | Our Ukraine | Tymoshenko Bloc | Party of Regions |
| Seats won | 30 | 25 | 15 |
Elected Head of Council
Mikhail Kichkovsky
Our Ukraine

Zakarpattia Oblast local election, 2006 is a local election in Zakarpattia Oblast that took place on March 26, 2006. 90 seats were split among seven political parties and blocks, which received at least 3% popular vote.

== Results ==
The distribution of the council's mandates was as follows:

- 30 mandates for the People's Union "Our Ukraine";
- 25 for the Yulia Tymoshenko Bloc;
- 15 for the Party of Regions;
- 7 for the Lytvyn People's Bloc;
- 5 for the Party of Hungarians of Ukraine "KMKS";
- 4 for the Democratic Party of Hungarians of Ukraine;
- 4 for the Socialist Party of Ukraine.

Mikhail Kichkovsky (Our Ukraine) was elected Chairman in April 2006.
