= Native Zakarpattia =

Ukrainian political party

Native Zakarpattia Рідне Закарпаття
- Leader: Andriy Novytskyi
- Founded: October 24, 2018
- Headquarters: Uzhhorod, Ukraine
- Ideology: Regionalism
- Verkhovna Rada: 0 / 450
- Zakarpattia Oblast Council: 12 / 64
- Regions: 354 / 43,122

Native Zakarpattia (Ukrainian: Рідне Закарпаття, romanized: Ridne Zakarpattia) is a political party in Zakarpattia Oblast, western Ukraine. Founded in 2018, its leader is Andriy Novytskyi. It holds a plurality of 12 seats on the Zakarpattia Oblast Council won in the 2020 Ukrainian local elections, making it the largest regional party in Zakarpattia. The party was founded by four Ukrainian MPs from the Dovira faction. These four MPs being Vasyl Petiovka, Valerii Lunchenko, Robert Horvat and Vladislav Poliak.

On 25 November 2021 Volodymyr Chubirko of Native Zakarpattia was elected chairman of the Zakarpattia Oblast Council.

On 9 September 2024 party member and member of the Zakarpattia Oblast Council Myroslav Biletskyi was appointed acting Governor of Zakarpattia Oblast.
