= Vasyl Hubal =

Ukrainian politician

- Василь Губаль
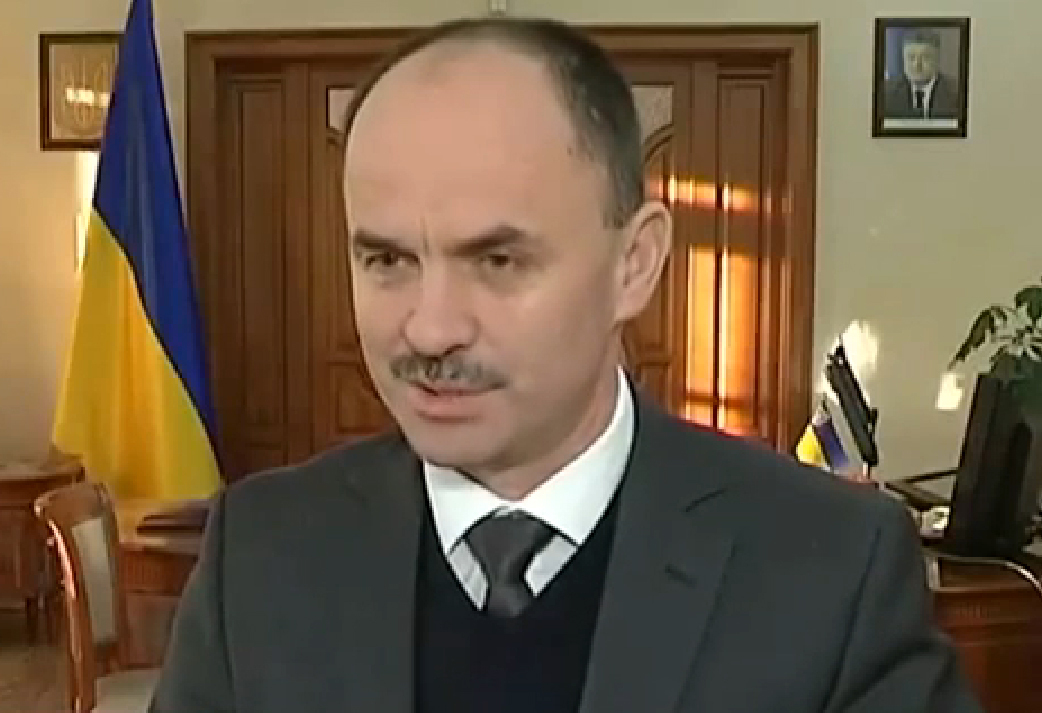
- Hubal in February 2015

Governor of Zakarpattia Oblast
- In office 17 September 2014 – 15 July 2015
- Preceded by: Valeriy Lunchenko
- Succeeded by: Hennadiy Moskal

Personal details
- Born: Vasyl Ivanovych Hubal; 5 June 1967 (age 59) Lypcha, Khust Raion, Ukrainian SSR, Soviet Union
- Party: Servant of the People; Non-partisan; People's Party
- Education: Lviv Polytechnic

Vasyl Ivanovych Hubal (Ukrainian: Василь Іванович Губаль; born 5 June 1967) is a Ukrainian politician. In 2014 to 2015, he was a leading figure in a political life of Zakarpattia.

Hubal was born near Khust. After serving in the Soviet Army from 1988 to 1992 he worked for several factories around Khust, including Khust Factory Technological Equipment and a brick factory of the "Radyanska Ukrayina" kolkhoz (collective farm).

In 2006-2014 Hubal was a member of the Khust Raion council. In 2010-2014 he was its chairman. In 2014-2015 he was a head of the Zakarpattia Oblast State Administration (Governor of Zakarpattia Oblast). When serving as a head of the Zakarpattia Oblast State Administration, Hubal was not able to prevent the 2015 Mukacheve incident, according to the parliamentary investigative committee. In 2014 some sources claimed, Hubal is being associated with the "Viktor Baloha clan".

When on 27 February 2024 the Khust City Council resigned Mayor Volodymyr Kashchuk Hubal was the secretary of the city council, in this capacity he became acting mayor in the absence of an elected mayor. At the time he was a member of the Servant of the People party.
