= Party of Hungarians of Ukraine (KMKSZ) =

Political party

Party of Hungarians of Ukraine Партія угорців України
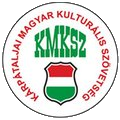
- President: László Brenzovics
- Founded: 26 February 1989; 37 years ago
- Headquarters: 88000 Uzhhorod, Zsupanát square 12
- Ideology: Hungarian minority interests Regionalism; Conservatism
- International affiliation: Centrist Democrat International
- Colors: Red; White; Green
- Verkhovna Rada: 0 / 450
- Zakarpattia Oblast Council: 8 / 64

Website
- https://kmksz.com.ua/

Party of Hungarians of Ukraine (KMKSZ) (Ukrainian: Партія угорців України, romanized: Partiia uhortsiv Ukrainy; Hungarian: „KMKSZ” Ukrajnai Magyar Párt) is a Hungarian minority interests party in Zakarpattia Oblast, Western Ukraine, which was founded in February 1989. It holds 8 seats on the Zakarpattia Oblast Council. The Hungarian Cultural Federation in Transcarpathia (KMKSZ) (Hungarian: Kárpátaljai Magyar Kulturális Szövetség) is associated with the political party.

The party is also allied with the governing party of Hungary, Fidesz. Historically, KMKSZ cooperated with Our Ukraine and Petro Poroshenko Bloc; while their rival Democratic Party of Hungarians of Ukraine cooperated with the Hungarian Socialist Party and later Jobbik in Hungary, and Social Democratic Party of Ukraine (united) and Party of Regions in Ukraine.

The other political party representing the Hungarian minority in Ukraine is the Democratic Party of Hungarians of Ukraine.

== Election results ==
=== Zakarpattia Oblast Council ===
Year	Popular vote	% of popular vote	Overall seats won	Seat change	Government
2006		3.4% (#5)	5 / 90	▲5	Opposition
2010	20.456	3.92% (#7)	3 / 90	▼2	Opposition
2015	41.517	9.44% (#4)	8 / 64	▲5	Opposition
2020	39.094	11.6% (#4)	8 / 64	Steady	Opposition

== See also ==
- Hungarians in Ukraine
