= Carpathian (disambiguation) =

The Carpathians are the Carpathian Mountains, a range of mountains across Central Europe.

Carpathian may also refer to:

== Places ==
- Carpathian Basin or Pannonian Basin, in Europe
- Carpathian Military District, a former district of the Soviet Armed Forces

== Fiction ==
- The Carpathians, a novel by Janet Frame
- Carpathians (race), fictional characters in Christine Feehan's Dark Series
- Carpathia, a fictional planet settled by human refugees from Earth in the one-season BBC sci-fi series Outcasts

== Other uses ==
- Carpathian, an Australian hardcore band
- Carpathian Forest, a Norwegian black metal band
- RMS Carpathia, the ship that rescued the survivors of the RMS Titanic
- Carpathian League, a European ice hockey league
- Carpathian Euroregion, an international association formed in 1993
- Carpathian Shepherd Dog, a Romanian sheep dog
- Carpathian goat
- Carpathian newt
- Framework Convention on the Protection and Sustainable Development of the Carpathians or Carpathian Convention, a convention on sustainable development of the Carpathian region
- Montes Carpatus, a mountain range on the nearside of Earth's Moon

== See also ==
- Carpathia (disambiguation)
- Carpathian Ruthenia (disambiguation)
- Carpathian Ukraine (disambiguation)
- Subcarpathian (disambiguation)
- Ciscarpathian (disambiguation)
- Transcarpathian (disambiguation)
- Transylvanian Carpathians (disambiguation)
- Karpathian, relating to Karpathos, a Greek island
