= Democratic Party of Hungarians of Ukraine =

Political party in Ukraine

The Democratic Party of Hungarians of Ukraine (in Ukrainian: Демократична партія угорців України, in Hungarian: Ukrajnai Magyarok Demokrata Pártja) is a regionalist political party in Ukraine, that was officially registered on 24 March 2005. The party offers competition to the other Hungarian minority party: the Party of Hungarians of Ukraine (KMKSZ). From 2005 to 2012 the leader of the party was István Gajdos, whose name has since 2018 been listed on the controversial Myrotvorets website.

The former leader of the party cooperated with the Jobbik political party of Hungary. In 2008, Gajdos signed a controversial decision of hoisting the Hungarian flag on the buildings of various public institutions and organizations in Berehove.

Nowadays the party is led by László Zubánics.

In the 2015 Ukrainian local elections, the Democratic Party of Hungarians of Ukraine and the Party of Hungarians of Ukraine formed a joint list and together won 8 seats in the Zakarpattia Oblast Council.

In the 2020 Ukrainian local elections, the party lost all of its seats in the Zakarpattia Oblast Council; however, it won 8 seats in Berehove city council, a result second only to the party's main competitor Party of Hungarians of Ukraine, which won 13 seats.
