= Andriy Baloha's Team =

Andriy Baloha's Team Команда Андрія Балоги
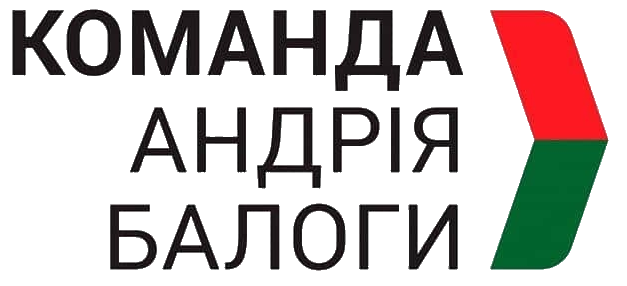
- Leader: Andriy Baloha
- Founded: September 24, 1999 (Party of Private Property) / March 27, 2008 (United Centre)
- Headquarters: Kyiv, Ukraine
- Ideology: Populism; Pro-Europeanism
- Colours: Red Green
- Verkhovna Rada: 1 / 450
- Zakarpattia Oblast Council: 7 / 64
- Regions: 194 / 43,122

Website
- komandaa.org.ua

Andriy Baloha's Team (Ukrainian: Команда Андрія Балоги, romanized: Komanda Andriya Balohy; formerly United Centre) is a Ukrainian political party. It is an offspring of Our Ukraine. Legally, Andriy Baloha's Team is the successor of the Party of Private Property (Ukrainian: Партія приватної власності; Partiya privatnoi vlasnosti), registered with the Ministry of Justice on September 24, 1999. The party changed its name to United Centre in March 2008. In 2020, the party was renamed Andriy Baloha's Team and consequently taken over by Mukachevo mayor Andriy Baloha.

As United Centre the party won three seats in the 2012 Ukrainian parliamentary election; but in February 2013 its member Pavlo Baloha was deprived of his deputy seats by the Higher Administrative Court of Ukraine because it had established that the election results in the single-member districts in which he was elected had been "unreliable". In the 2014 parliamentary election the party won no parliamentary seats. In the 2019 parliamentary election, the party won one seat as Viktor Baloha was elected to the Verkhovna Rada.

== History ==
=== Party of Private Property ===
The Party of Private Property was registered with the Ministry of Justice on September 24, 1999. In the 1999 Ukrainian presidential election, the party endorsed incumbent president, Leonid Kuchma.

During the Ukrainian parliamentary elections 2002, it was part of the electoral alliance Team of Winter Generation. Team of Winter Generation won 2.0% of the popular vote and no seats.

The Party of Private Property did not participate in the Ukrainian parliamentary elections of 2006 and 2007.

A merger of United Centre with the Democratic Party of Ukraine failed to materialize prior to the first congress of the United Centre.

=== United Centre ===
Logo of United Centre

==== Viktor Yushchenko Presidency (2008–2009) ====
In February 2008, several prominent members left Our Ukraine. Viktor Baloha, Head of the President's Secretariat resigned on February 15. Roman Bezsmertny, a high ranking party official, along with people's deputies Mykhaylo Polyanchych, Ihor Kril, Viktor Topolov, Oksana Bilozir and Vasyl Petiovka, resigned on February 20, declaring in a joint statement that: "some of the leaders of the party play their own game, coming from personal interests and it has nothing to do with responsibility, pluralism and norms of democracy."

At the sixth Party Congress of the Party of Private Property, held on 20 March 2008, the party decided to change its name to United Centre. At this time the party's goals were: "assisting President Viktor Yushchenko to realize his program of actions" and "to unite Eastern Ukraine and Western Ukraine".

On March 27, United Centre held the founding meeting in Kyiv. On July 8, Presidential Secretariat's Chief Baloha entered the United Centre party. On July 12, 2008, United Centre re-elected Verkhovna Rada deputy Ihor Kril of Our Ukraine - People's Self-Defense. The merger of United Center with the Democratic Party of Ukraine failed to materialize prior to the congress. Administrative pressure by governors upon state employees to sign up to United Centre is said to be ongoing. Our Ukraine-People's Self-Defence Bloc complained that members of its regional branches are being poached by United Centre.

In October 2008, the Social Christian Party merged with United Centre.

On October 21, 2008, the presidium of People's Union Our Ukraine decided not to team up with any other party then the Our Ukraine–People's Self-Defense Bloc for the 2008 snap parliamentary poll and called the idea of teaming up with United Centre "impossible". On 20 November 2008, the United Centre leader Ihor Kril said the party would participate independently in the next parliamentary elections and that he "fully supports the view that the format of Our Ukraine-People's Self-Defense Bloc, as it exists now, is not realistic or effective. Every political force should take responsibility for their actions before the electorate."

According to UNIAN, the People's Union Our Ukraine and United Centre parties were to carry out a unifying congress on January 17, 2009. The People's Democratic Party was reported to join the move. However, nothing like this happened.

Viktor Baloha resigned as Head of the Secretariat of the President of Ukraine because he was against President Yushchenko's decision to run for president for a second term and alleged nepotism.

==== Viktor Yanukovych Presidency (2010–2014) ====
The party did not join the parliamentary coalition which supported the Azarov Government in March 2010 because the Communist Party of Ukraine was a part of that coalition.

A March 2010 poll predicted that the party would get 0.2% of the vote at the 2012 Ukrainian parliamentary election.

In early August 2010, parliamentarian Kyrylo Kulykov joined the party, thus making six United Centre lawmakers in the Verkhovna Rada. Kulykov had switched from Yuriy Lutsenko's People's Self-Defense. This was still nine too short to form a United Centre faction in the Verkhovna Rada.

In the 2010 local elections, the party won a few representatives in regional parliaments and then went to achieve a stunning victory in the Zakarpattia Oblast.

On November 12, 2010, President Viktor Yanukovych appointed party leader Viktor Baloha Minister of Emergencies and Minister of the Protection of the Population from the Chernobyl disaster . According to Baloha, this did not mean his party would join the coalition government. According to Ukrayinska Pravda, the United Centre deputies in parliament already quietly voted with the Party of Regions (the main component of the Azarov Government). Deputy Lesya Orobets left the party after Baloha's appointment because the party never informed her about it.

According to Ukrainian media Strong Ukraine, party leader Serhiy Tyhypko personally prevented a merger of United Centre with Party of Regions in March 2012.

The party did not take part in the October 2012 Ukrainian parliamentary election nationwide proportional party-list system; instead, nine members of the party tried to win seats in the 225 local single-member districts. The party won three constituencies (all in Zakarpattia) and thus parliamentary representation. These seats were won by Viktor Baloha, Vasyl Petiovka and Pavlo Baloha. Pavlo Baloha joined the faction of Party of Regions in December 2012, while Viktor Baloha and Petiovka did not join any faction. Pavlo Baloha left the Party of Regions faction in mid-April 2012 to become an unaffiliated lawmaker too.

Pavlo Baloha was deprived of his deputy seats on 8 February 2013 by the Higher Administrative Court of Ukraine because it had established that the election results in the single-member districts in which he was elected (single-member districts number 71 in Zakarpattia Oblast) had been "unreliable". On 7 July 2013 Pavlo Baloha's mandate was officially cancelled.

==== After 2014 ====
In the 2014 parliamentary election, the party did not compete on the nationwide party list and also did not win a constituency seat and thus no parliamentary seats.

In the 2019 parliamentary election, the party won one seat; Viktor Baloha was elected (for the party) to parliament.

=== Andriy Baloha's Team ===
In August 2020, ahead of the 2020 Ukrainian local elections, the party was renamed Andriy Baloha's Team, and taken over by Viktor Baloha's son, Andriy Baloha. Under the new name, the party saw a revival as a regional political force in Zakarpattia Oblast. Even though it only ran candidates within Zakarpattia, the organization garnered 0.5% of the total vote across Ukraine in the 2020 elections, winning 194 seats on local councils across Zakarpattia and 7 seats on the regional legislature, the Zakarpattia Oblast Council. Its most notable success came in the city of Mukachevo, where Andriy Baloha was reelected mayor. Baloha received 54% of the vote, allowing him to bypass a potential runoff election.

In January 2022, Andriy Baloha joined (former parliamentary speaker) Dmytro Razumkov's new political project.

== Stances ==
The party rejects any possibility of joining a parliamentary coalition with the Communist Party of Ukraine.

== Election results ==
Parliamentary since 1994 (year links to election page)
Year	Bloc	Votes	%	Mandates
2002	Team of Winter Generation	525,025	2.10	0 (0)
2006	did not participate			
2007	did not participate			
2012		N/A	N/A	0 (3)
2014	did not participate			
2019		N/A	N/A	0 (1)

== See also ==
- 2008 Ukrainian political crisis
- 2007 Ukrainian parliamentary election
- List of Ukrainian Parliament Members 2007
