= Oschadbank =

Ukrainian state savings bank

PAT Oschadbank
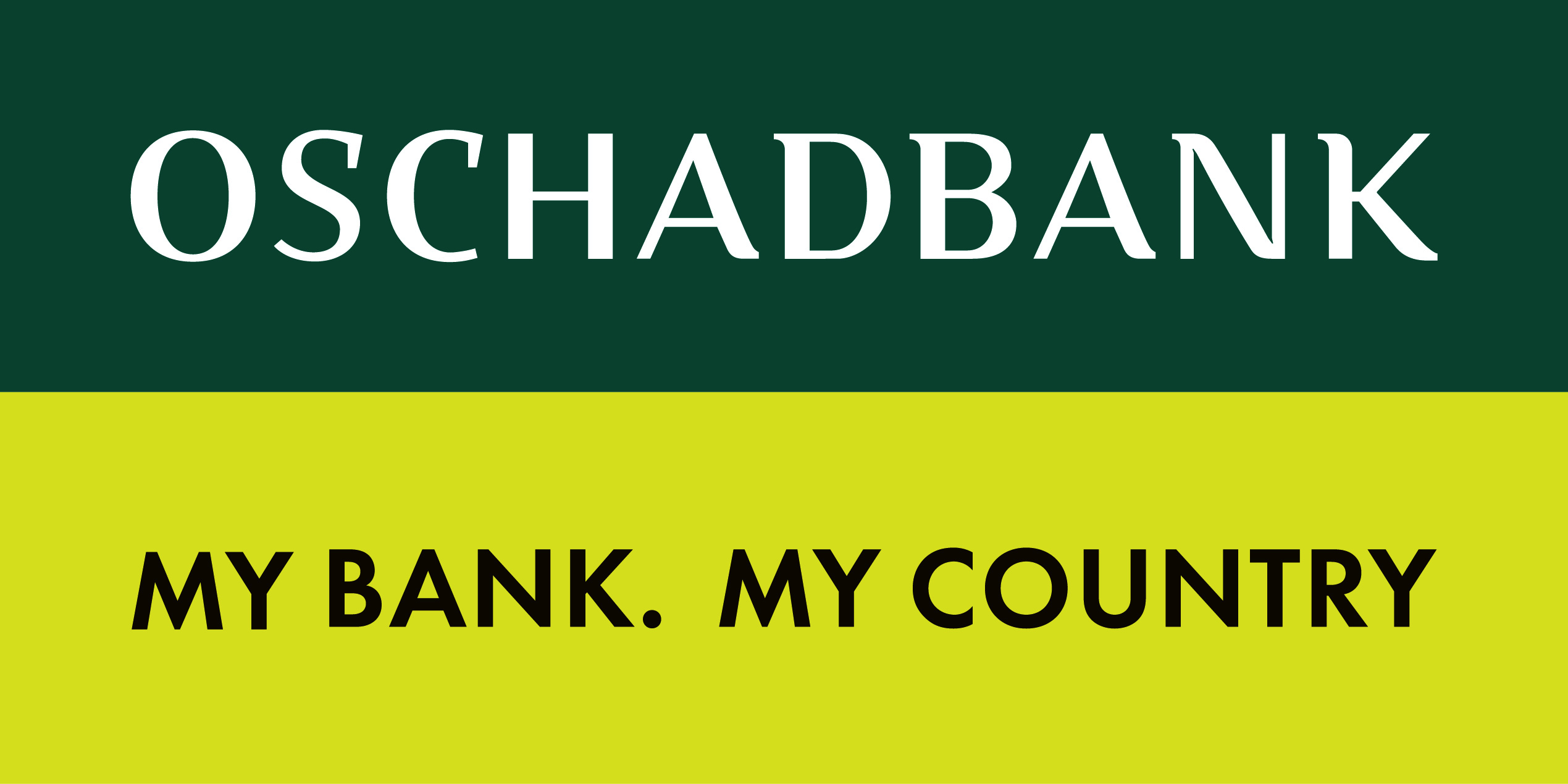

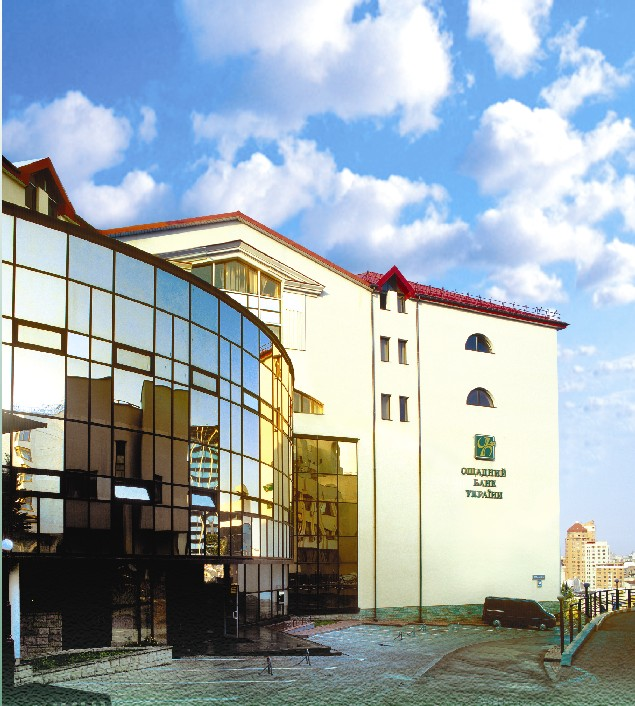
- Head office in Kyiv (2012)
- Type: Public joint-stock company
- Industry: Banking, investment
- Founded: 21 May 1999, (approved by NBU on 31 December 1991)
- Founder: Government of Ukraine
- Headquarters: Kyiv, Ukraine
- Key people: Serhii Naumov (Chairman)
- Services: Financial services
- Revenue: ▲ ₴10 billion
- Operating income: ▲ ₴5.8 billion
- Net income: ▲ ₴1.1 billion
- Total assets: ▲ ₴494.5 billion
- Total equity: ▲ ₴47.8 billion
- Owner: Government of Ukraine
- Website: www.oschadbank.ua
- Footnotes; All figures annualized for 2017

PAT Oschadbank (Ukrainian: ПАТ «Ощадбанк», lit. 'PJSC savings bank') is a major public bank in Ukraine. In early 2024, it was confirmed by the National Bank of Ukraine as one of the country's systemically important banks.

In April 2022, Oschadbank became a member of the Individual Deposit Guarantee Fund (FGVFO).

As of the first of July, 2023, the bank had 1,183 branches and 2,790 ATMs throughout the country which carry out various functions, such as the disbursement of pensions, social aid, processing of utility payments and other banking transactions.

The head office of Oschadbank is located in Kyiv. As of 2020, the bank received a net profit of ₴2.78 billion, which is ₴2.5 billion more than in 2019.

== History ==
With the dissolution of the Soviet Union, the Ukrainian operations of the Savings Bank of the USSR were reorganized as a stand-alone institution, the State Specialized Commercial Savings Bank of Ukraine. On 21 May 1999, the latter was transformed by Decree of the Cabinet of Ministers of Ukraine into Oschadbank, a joint-stock company.

According to the British magazine The Banker, in 2014 Oschadbank ranked 10th in the ranking of the largest banks in Central and Eastern Europe and 367th in the ranking of the top 1000 world banks.

As of the end of 2016, the bank had 3,650 branches and 2,850 ATMs throughout the country. Together with PrivatBank, Oschadbank was one of the few two Ukrainian banks whose clients' time deposits are fully guaranteed by state law compared to total of ₴ 200,000 in other banks in case of bank liquidation. (However, since martial law was declared in 2022 in response to the open, full-scale invasion of Ukraine by the Russian military, the deposit guarantee has been extended much more broadly)

For a long time, the bank remained the only one of 74 Ukrainian banks that was not a member of the Deposit Guarantee Fund. In April 2022, the Law of Ukraine "On Amendments to Certain Laws of Ukraine on Ensuring the Stability of the Deposit Guarantee System" came into force, which aims to increase depositors' confidence in the banking system and ensure its stability. It is within the framework of this law that Oschadbank joined the DGF.

Oschadbank claims the trademark of Sberbank (Ukrainian: Сбербанк) in Ukraine. In a 2020 court case with the Russian Sberbank company, the Supreme Court of Ukraine affirmed Oschadbank as the legal holder of the Sberbank trademark.

=== Legal proceedings against Russia ===
After the 2014 Russian annexation of Crimea, Russia expropriated Oschadbank's assets in Crimea, against which the bank initiated legal proceedings. In 2016, the Permanent Court of Arbitration in The Hague ruled in favour of Oschadbank, and ordered the Russian Federation to pay 1.1 billion USD in compensation. In 2018, the Arbitral Tribunal (Court of Appeal) in Paris recognised the ruling. The Supreme Court of France confirmed the ruling in 2021, and announced its final decision in 2022. In April 2025, Oschadbank registered seizure of Russian assets in France worth approximately €87 million ($99 million) as part of the arbitration award in compensation for damages inflicted by Russia's actions.

== Gallery ==
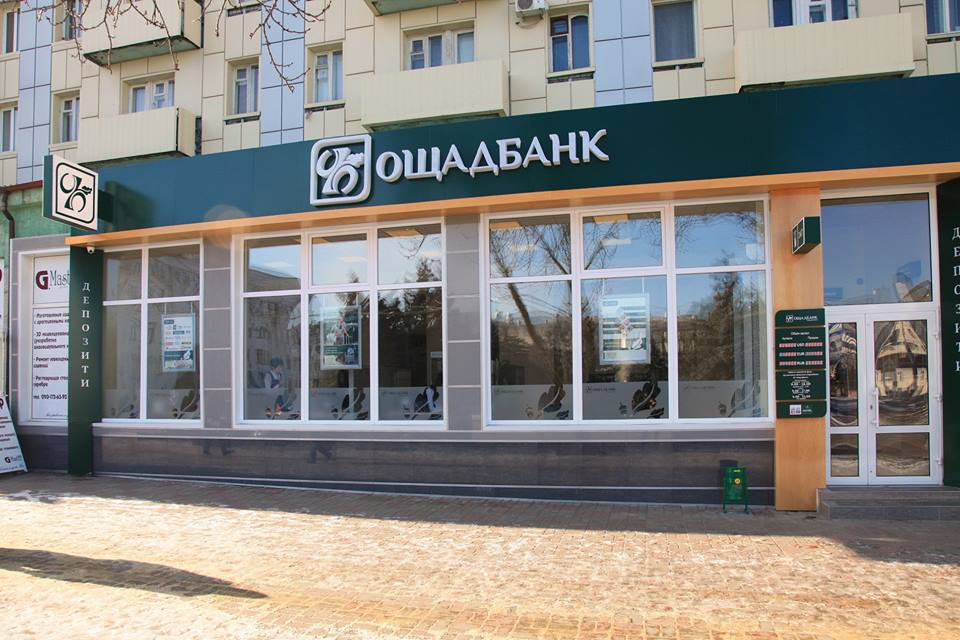
Oschadbank branch in Luhansk (2014)

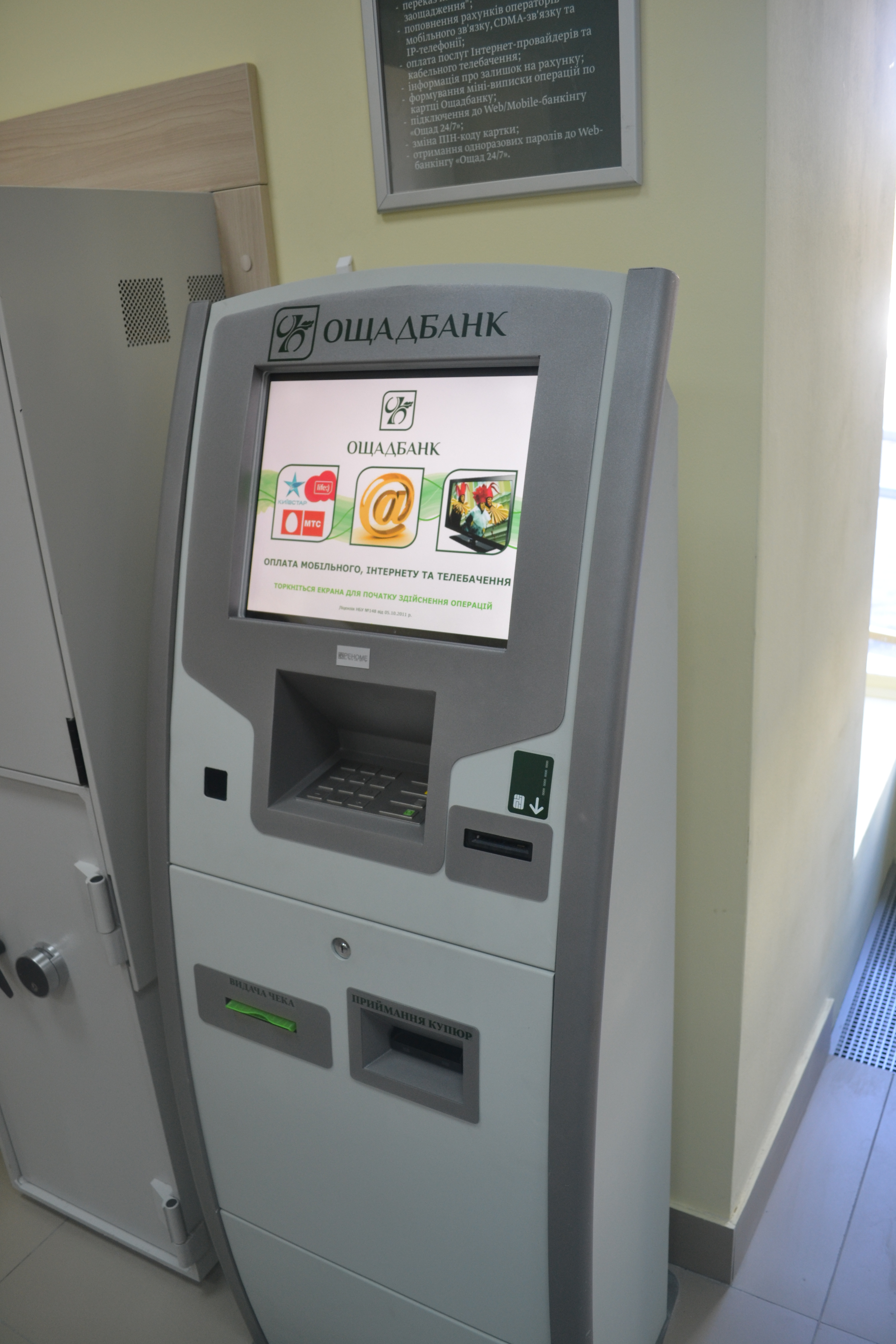
Oshchadbank Automated teller machine

Former logo

== Interesting facts ==
- Former lawyer of this bank Iryna Mudra in Ukraine became Deputy Minister of Justice of Ukraine.
- In 2023, Oschadbank entered the top 200 companies of Ukraine in terms of revenue.

== See also ==
- State Labor Savings Banks System of the USSR
- List of banks in Ukraine
