= Andriy Haichenko =

Deputy Minister of Justice of Ukraine since 2019

Andrii Haichenko
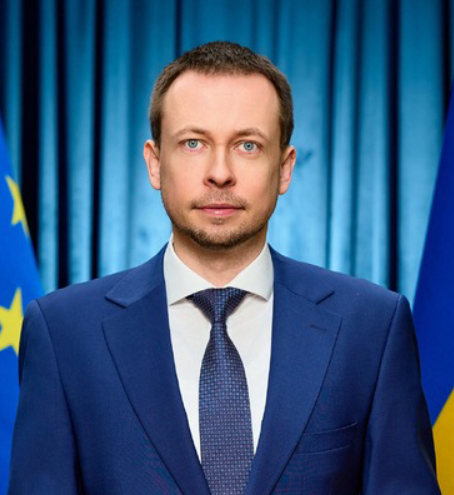

Deputy Minister of Justice of Ukraine
- Incumbent
- Assumed office 27 September 2019
- President: Volodymyr Zelenskyy
- Prime Minister: Oleksiy Honcharuk
- Prime Minister: Denys Shmyhal
- Prime Minister: Yulia Svyrydenko

Personal details
- Born: 26 January 1984 (age 42) Kyiv, USSR (now Ukraine)
- Children: 1
- Education: Master of Laws
- Alma mater: MAUP
- Occupation: Lawyer

Andrii Vitaliyovich Haichenko (Ukrainian: Андрій Віталійович Гайченко, romanized: Andriy Vitaliovych Gaichenko; born 26 January 1984) is a Ukrainian lawyer who is the Deputy Head of the Ministry of Justice of Ukraine, responsible for the State Executive Service since 27 September 2019. Since 2025, he has also been responsible for the policy of the Ministry of Justice of Ukraine in front-line regions. A graduate of the MAUP, he was a member of the supervisory board of "Skybank".

== Biography ==
Andrii Haichenko was born 26th of September, 1984, in Kyiv. Father Vitaliy Andriyovych Haichenko (1946) – Doctor of Biological Sciences, Professor of the National University of Life and Environmental Sciences of Ukraine. Mother Lyudmila Oleksandrivna Tsyndrovska (1950) – employee of the Kyiv Museum of Archeology.

In 2006, he graduated with a specialization in "Commercial and Labor Law".

Haichenko began as chief legal advisor in 2005, later as head of the litigation sector of the dispute settlement department, and then as deputy head of the dispute settlement department of JSCB "Ukrsotsbank".

From October 2008 to April 2009, he was the director of LLC "Law Company "Contract".

In 2009 - 2017, he served as head of the claims and litigation department of the PJSC "Ukrsotsbank" Legal Department.

Chairman of the Arbitration Court at the Independent Association of Banks of Ukraine (2015 - 2019).

In 2017 - 2018, he was an attorney at "Integrites", then Head of the Department for Work with Law Enforcement Agencies of PJSC “Brokbusinessbank”.

From May 2019 – Advisor to the chairman of the Board of JSC “Skybank”.

September 29, 2019 – Deputy Minister of Justice of Ukraine for the Enforcement Service.

== Deputy Minister of Justice of Ukraine ==
He implements a policy of eliminating corruption practices and risks in the executive service and in the field of expert justice provision, as well as a policy of increasing the level of execution of court decisions.

Haichenko introduced automated, anonymous testing for persons who intend to obtain or confirm their qualification as a judicial expert. He limited the influence of the heads of forensic examination institutes over experts, as disciplinary and qualification powers were transferred from the institutes to the Ministry of Justice. The Deputy Minister also initiated the renewal of the Disciplinary Commissions' composition and procedures, and the expansion of the list of judicial examinations that can be conducted by private experts.

Andriy Haichenko initiated the second stage of the executive service reform to eliminate "gray" schemes. The main elements of the reform are:

- consolidation of a stricter than now principle of territoriality when deciding on the opening of enforcement proceedings;
- granting the right to third parties whose rights and legitimate interests have been violated during enforcement proceedings to file complaints against the actions of a private enforcement agent;
- carrying out reform of the digitalization of the execution of court decisions and achieving the adoption of the relevant law (draft law 14005). Its goal was to automate the removal of arrests upon payment of debt, which will make life easier for law-abiding citizens and eliminate long-standing corruption risks in the process of removing arrests by state and private executors. The purpose of the law is to increase the efficiency and speed of debt collection by digitizing processes.

To increase the efficiency of the enforcement of court decisions, Gaichenko initiated and implemented significant number of procedures in enforcement proceedings.

Under his leadership, amendments to Ukrainian legislation on enforcement proceedings—initiated by the Ministry of Justice of Ukraine—have come into effect. Among other measures, the reform provides for the automatic lifting of seizures on bank accounts immediately upon full repayment of the debt within the framework of enforcement proceedings. The primary practical benefit for citizens is that, once the debt is paid, there is no longer a need to personally contact the enforcement officer or wait for decisions to be issued in paper form.
