= Iryna Mudra =

Deputy Head of the Office of the President of Ukraine since 2024

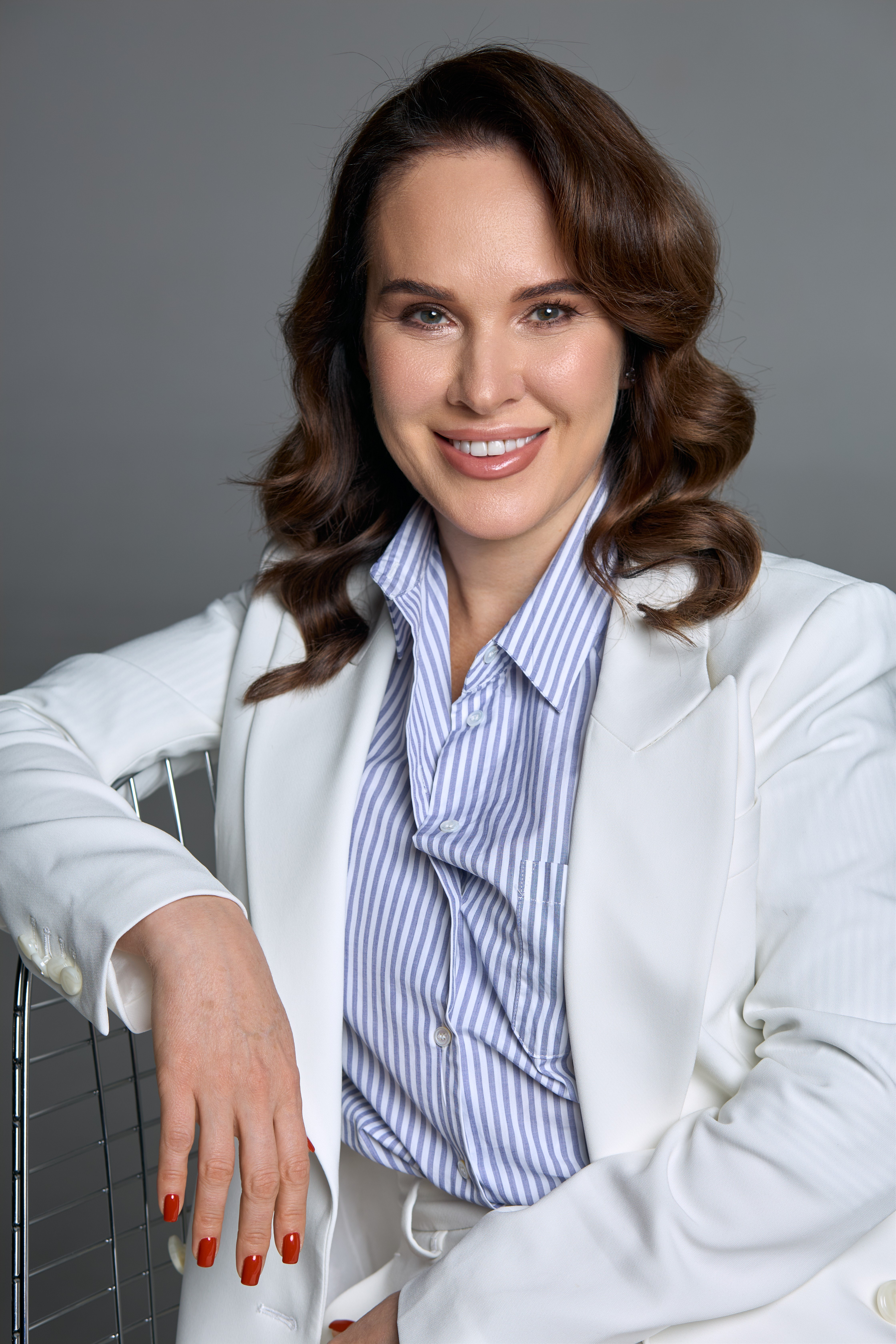
- Mudra in 2025

Deputy Head of the Office of the President of Ukraine
- In office 30 March 2024 – 19 August 2026
- President: Volodymyr Zelenskyy

Deputy Minister of Justice of Ukraine
- In office 27 May 2022 – 29 March 2024
- President: Volodymyr Zelenskyy
- Prime Minister: Denys Shmyhal

Personal details
- Born: 26 July 1975 (age 51) Medenychi, Drohobych Raion, Lviv oblast, USSR (now Ukraine)
- Children: 2
- Education: MBA course at Kyiv School of Economics
- Alma mater: Drohobych State Pedagogical University of Ivan Franko; University of Lviv
- Occupation: Lawyer

Iryna Romanivna Mudra (Ukrainian: Ірина Романівна Мудра, romanized: Iryna Romanivna Mudra; born 26 July 1975) is a Ukrainian lawyer who was the Deputy Head of the Office of the President of Ukraine, responsible for legal matters from 30 March 2024 to 19 August 2026. A graduate of the University of Lviv, she was a lawyer at the State Savings Bank of Ukraine before she began working for the state. In the international arena, she is known for publicly promoting the special tribunal for the crime of aggression and development of a mechanism for sanctions and reparations against the Russian Federation for the war against Ukraine.

== Biography ==
Iryna Mudra was born on 26 July 1975 in Medenychi, Drohobych Raion, Lviv region. In 1998, she graduated from Ivan Franko Pedagogical Institute at the Faculty of Foreign Languages with honors. From 2002 to 2006, she studied on Faculty of Law of Ivan Franko Lviv National University. In 2017, Mudra completed a particular course for lawyers in Legal English at the University of Cambridge, in 2017—2018 she completed an MBA course at the Kyiv School of Economics. From 2019 to 2020, she completed an internship at the International Compliance Association (London) and received a certificate in Corporate Management, Risks and Compliance.

In 2006–2008, Mudra worked as a head of the department of credit and investment activities of the legal department of Transbank, in 2008–2013 she worked in Swedbank. From 2013 to 2015, she served as head of the legal department of risk management of Pravex Bank, and from 2015 to 2022 — as a head of the legal team of the State Savings Bank of Ukraine (Oschadbank).

== Deputy Minister of Justice of Ukraine ==
On 20 May 2022, by Order No. 394 of the Cabinet of Ministers of Ukraine, Iryna Mudra was appointed Deputy Minister of Justice of Ukraine. The cash crunch has concentrated Ukrainian officials' gaze on Russia's sanctioned oligarchs. The government has been working the diplomatic channels since the beginning of June to build political momentum for an accord to make the Russians pay, Deputy Minister of Justice Iryna Mudra 5 July said in an interview from Kyiv. "Of course, we are very thankful to our allies for stepping up with financial help," she said. "But we do have to admit that it should be the Russians who should pay for all these damages." However, there's no readymade legal structure that would allow for seizing frozen Russian assets and sending them to Ukraine, she said, especially since Russia could veto anything at the U.N. level from its perch on the Security Council. So instead, the Ukrainian government is aiming to get, at the very least, the global community's "blessing" at the U.N. General Assembly in September, Mudra said. In addition to Russian assets, Kyiv would also like to see a special tax on transactions with Russia.

On 7 July, Mudra stated that the project to digitize the justice system had been postponed for several years. But now, it's time to move as fast as possible, thanks to the roadmap for EU accession. On the timing of the reconstruction, Mudra states that the war is still ongoing. Still, the important thing is to have a clear and transparent process, which is why they must create a legal context in advance to confiscate the Russian assets. In August, Mudra said trials could not be held for Ukrainian prisoners of war. At the same time, she that Ukraine records the crimes committed by Russian Federation and uses available international legal opportunities to ensure the rights of Ukrainian defenders held captive by the Russian occupiers.

In September, the media wrote about her: "But even that is no easy task. Ukraine's deputy justice minister, Iryna Mudra, this month is touring capitals in Europe and the U.S. to convince governments to track down assets of sanctioned Russians — and confiscate them... Mudra also wants the EU to confiscate Russian state assets, not just private ones, to use for the reconstruction of Ukraine. That plan, however, faces legal hurdles and is unlikely to become reality any time soon — which Mudra acknowledges." Mudra stated in September that her country has no prospects of receiving reparations from Russia in international courts. She explained that Russia had withdrawn from the Council of Europe and had agreed not to implement the decisions issued by the European Court of Human Rights after March 15. According to the Ukrainian politician, the Russian funds confiscated so far will not be enough to rebuild Ukraine.

In September 2022, German politician Günter Krings wrote: "Yesterday I was able to exchange views with the Ukrainian Minister of Justice, Denys Maliuska, his deputy Iryna Mudra and other colleagues from the Kyiv government, together with colleagues from the legal committee of our Bundestag. Ukrainian officials have demanded that oligarchs' assets be frozen and confiscated for future reparations claims. Natural and legal persons in Ukraine should receive compensation for it. Compensation should also be paid for environmental damage. Establishing a compensation fund and a register of all damages was suggested. Even before the summer break, we, as the Union, had called for the sanctions against oligarchs to be improved and will be happy to take up this topic and follow it closely."

Later, Mudra attended the UK: "Ukraine's deputy justice minister, Iryna Mudra, was in London last week to discuss the issue with the Foreign Office after lobbying the Council of Europe's council of ministers in Strasbourg alongside Olena Zelenska, the wife of the Ukrainian president, Volodymyr Zelenskyy. A former banker, Mudra has been at the helm of the detailed legal and political discussions on reparations, holding talks in Germany, Paris, and Brussels and with the US treasury assistant secretary, Elizabeth Rosenberg."

== Deputy Head of the Office of the President of Ukraine ==
On 29 March 2024, she was appointed Deputy Head of the Office of the President of Ukraine by decree of the President of Ukraine. Mudra led the preparation of the draft law on the Ratification of the Rome Statute of the International Criminal Court. Mudra is one of the chief architects behind the international compensation mechanism for Ukraine, an initiative aimed at securing compensation for war damages. She has been a key advocate in negotiations surrounding the design and operationalization of the Register of Damage in The Hague and th Claims Commission for Ukraine.

In parallel, Mudra has been leading the international effort to establish a Special Tribunal for the Crime of Aggression against Ukraine. She represents Ukraine in the Core Group of states working to create the tribunal, advocating for a structure that would ensure accountability for the crime of aggression. Her work emphasizes the principle that sustainable peace must be grounded in justice, and that the crime of aggression — the "supreme international crime" — cannot go unpunished.

On 19 August 2026, her office was raided by the National Anti-Corruption Bureau of Ukraine. In a statement, the organisation said it was "conducting a special operation to expose a criminal organization allegedly led by a current and a former Ukrainian lawmaker and involving senior officials from the President's Office." She was fired by President Zelenskyy shortly afterwards.

== Awards ==
- 2018 – Best Legal Adviser in Banking and Financial Law at the "50 Leading Legal Departments of Ukraine" awards ceremony.
- 2023 – Winner in the category “Women Leaders Who Have Influenced the Development of the Legal Community” in the Ukrainian Women in Law ranking
- 2024 – Awarded the Woman 2023 prize by the international glossy magazine Business Woman in the category International Politics and Diplomacy

== Personal life ==
Mudra is from a Jewish family, describing herself as a "proud Ukrainian Jew", and the Chief Rabbi of Kyiv Jonathan Markovitch offered personal surety for her bail application when she was arrested on corruption charges. She has two children.
