= Carpathian goat =

Breed of goat

The Carpathian goat is a usually white-coated breed from southeastern Europe (including Romania and Poland) is used for the production of meat and milk.

== Sources ==
"Carpathian Goat". Archived from the original on 23 December 2008.
