= Youth Party of Ukraine =

Ukrainian political party

The Youth Party of Ukraine (Ukrainian: Молодіжна партія України, romanized: Molodizhna partiia Ukrainy) is a political party in Ukraine registered in September 1999. At the legislative elections, 30 March 2002, the party was part of the Viktor Yushchenko Bloc Our Ukraine. It did not participate in general elections since.

The party supported Viktor Yanukovych as presidential candidate in the 2010 Ukrainian presidential election; even though it participated in the Orange Revolution which was aimed against Yanukovych. (Note: The party declared on its eighth congress on December 5, 2009: "We were on the Maidan in 2004. Together with the majority of young people we defended the principles of freedom, new views of the reform of the state, but instead we received crisis after crisis, anarchy and total chaos. [We have seen] chaos in all its forms, in all branches of power, and that's why we should acknowledge our historical mistakes and join with a person who is ready and is able to break a chain that is ruinous for Ukraine.")

The party did not take part in the 2012 Ukrainian parliamentary election nationwide proportional party-list system; instead one member of the party tried to win parliamentary seats in 9 of the 225 local single-member districts; but this mission failed.

The party did not participate in the 2014 Ukrainian parliamentary election.
