= Transcarpathia (disambiguation) =

Transcarpathia is the historical region around present-day Zakarpattia Oblast, southwest of a portion of the Carpathian Mountains.

Transcarpathia may also refer to:

== Place ==
- Ukrainian Transcarpathia or Transcarpathian Ukraine, designation for a Ukrainian region beyond the Carpathian Mountains, including:
  - Ukrainian Transcarpathia (1918–1919), short-lived unification project and claim of the West Ukrainian People's Republic
  - Ukrainian Transcarpathia (1938–1939), an autonomous region, and in 1939 a short-lived unrecognized republic known as "Carpathian Ukraine"
  - Transcarpathian Oblast (or Zakarpattia Oblast), an administrative unit of Ukraine, covering the Ukrainian Transcarpathian region

== Other ==
- Transcarpathian Academy of Arts, in Uzhhorod, Ukraine
- Transkarpatia, the fifth album by the Polish symphonic black metal band Darzamat

== See also ==
- Carpathia (disambiguation)
- Carpathian (disambiguation)
- Subcarpathia (disambiguation)
- Subcarpathian (disambiguation)
- Outer Subcarpathia, the depression area at the outer base of the Carpathian arc
- Inner Subcarpathia, the depression area at the inner base of the Carpathian arc
- Zakarpattia (disambiguation)
