= Oleksandr Zholobetskyi =

Ukrainian politician and entrepreneur

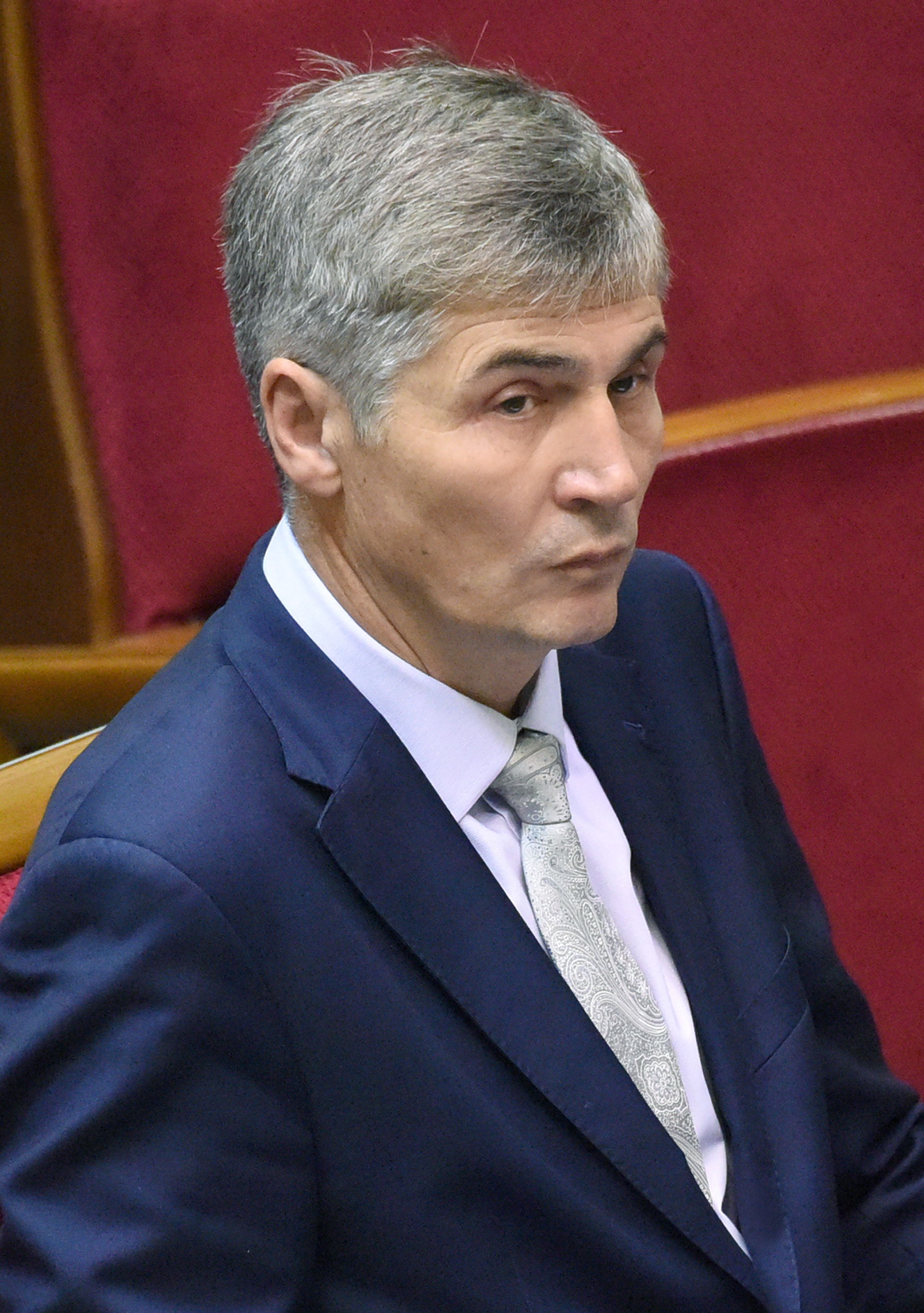

People's Deputy of Ukraine

8th convocation
- Incumbent
- Assumed office November 27, 2014

Personal details
- Born: April 24, 1966 (age 60) Mykolaiv, Ukrainian SSR, Soviet Union
- Education: Murmansk High Marine School

Oleksandr Oleksandrovych Zholobetskyi (Ukrainian: Жолобецький Олександр Олександрович; was born April 24, 1966, in Mykolaiv) — a Ukrainian social-politic leader and statesman, an entrepreneur, People's Deputy of Ukraine of the VIIIth convocation.

== Bibliography ==
He was born into a family of shipbuilders: his father worked 3 years at the Black Sea shipbuilding plant, his mother is a worker. In 1983 he graduated from Secondary School No. 52 with honour, in 1988 — Murmansk High Marine School on specialty «ship engineer-electromechanician». In 1988—1991 he worked as a ship electromechanician at oversees ships Joint-stock company «Dalmoreproduct». Since 1991, having returned to Mykolaiv, is engaged in entrepreneurship (built the first private Petrol Retail Station in the city). In 2007 he graduated from Odesa region’s Institutum Public Administration National Academiae Public Administration sub Praeses Ucraina with qualification “Master of State Administration”.

== Political career ==
In 2002—2004 he headed Mykolaiv City organization of Ukraine's party of manufacturers and entrepreneurs, protected against falsifications during the Presidential Elections. In 2002 —2010 – a deputy of Mykolaiv City Council of the IV—VIth convocations. Since 27.11.2014 he is a deputy of Ukraine of the VIIIth convocation.

- Elected in: Election district #129
- Region: Mykolaiv Oblast
- Faction: Member of the deputy faction of Party Petro Poroshenko Bloc "Solidarity"
- Post: Chairperson of the subcommittee on insurance activities of the Verkhovna Rada of Ukraine Committee on Financial Policy and Banking

== Social activity ==
In the frames of deputy's activity he is famous as an initiator of the parkland “Pobeda”, Vavarovskyi stadium and City Embankment return to the city's property, the cancel of Mykolaiv's Portland selling to enterprise «Nika-Tera». An honoured president of «St.Antoniy» Fund. Since November, 2013 he is a participant of the Maidan activities in Kyiv.

During his tenure in the Verkhovna Rada of Ukraine, he authored and co-authored 37 bills (December 2014 - April 2016).

Among the most resonant and significant ones, both for Mykolaiv region and for Ukraine as a whole, is the "Draft Law on Amendments to the Budget Code of Ukraine on Financing the Reconstruction and Maintenance of Public Roads of National Importance throughout Ukraine".

As part of his parliamentary activities, he is known as the initiator of returning the lands of the Peremoha Park, Varvarivskyi Stadium, and the city embankment to the city ownership, and canceling the sale of port land in Mykolaiv to the Nika-Tera company.

On September 20, 2016, he did not vote for the draft resolution on "Statement of the Verkhovna Rada of Ukraine on Ukraine's non-recognition of the legitimacy of the elections to the State Duma of the Federal Assembly of the Russian Federation of the seventh convocation".

== Family ==
Wife — Olena Mykolaivna Zholobetskaya. Sons – Borys, Olexandr.

== Awards ==
A Certificate of Appreciation of Ministry of Labour and social policy of Ukraine (2005)
