= Viktor Baloha =

Ukrainian politician

- Віктор Балога
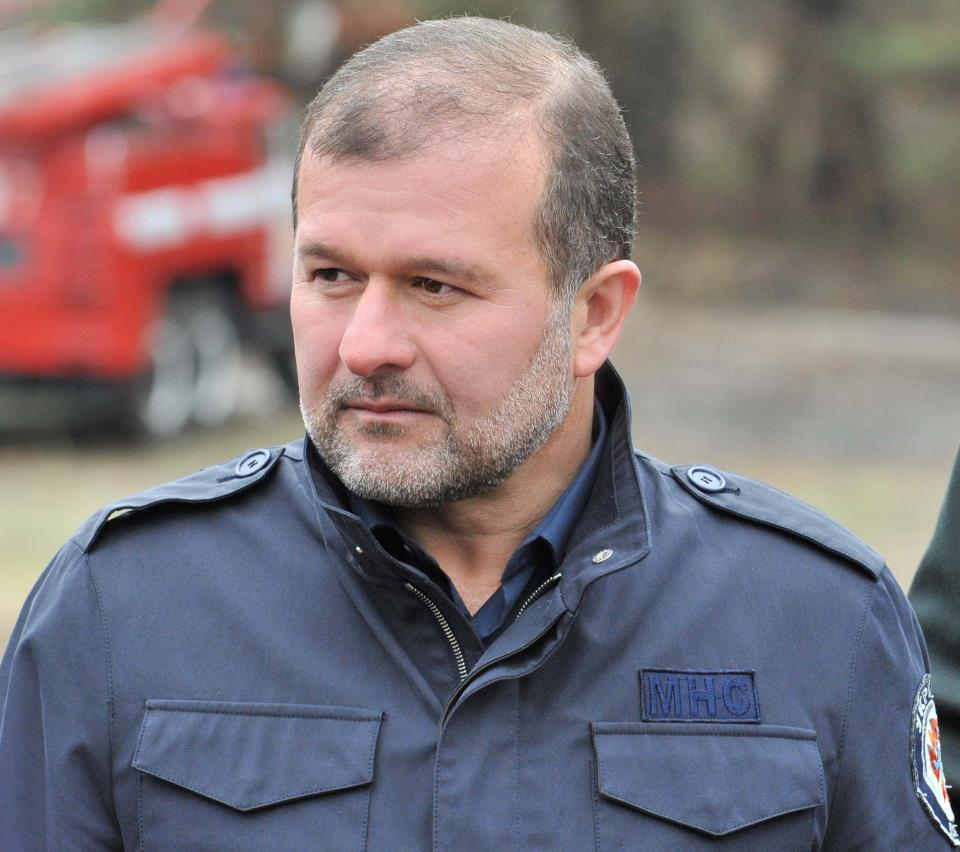
- Baloha in 2012

People's Deputy of Ukraine
- Incumbent
- Assumed office 15 December 2012

Emergency Minister of Ukraine
- In office 12 November 2010 – 20 November 2012
- President: Viktor Yanukovych
- Prime Minister: Mykola Azarov
- Preceded by: Mykhaylo Bolotskykh
- Succeeded by: Ministry of Defense

Head of the Secretariat of the President of Ukraine
- In office 15 September 2006 – 19 May 2009
- President: Viktor Yushchenko
- Preceded by: Oleh Rybachuk
- Succeeded by: Vira Ulianchenko

Emergency Minister of Ukraine
- In office 27 September 2005 – 5 October 2006
- President: Viktor Yushchenko
- Prime Minister: Yuriy Yekhanurov
- Preceded by: Davyd Zhvania
- Succeeded by: Nestor Shufrych

Governor of Zakarpattia
- In office 4 February 2005 – 27 September 2005
- President: Leonid Kuchma
- Preceded by: Ivan Rizak
- Succeeded by: Oleh Gavashi
- In office 5 May 1999 – 1 June 2001
- Preceded by: Sergiy Ustych
- Succeeded by: Hennadiy Moskal

Mayor of Mukachevo
- In office 10 April 1998 – 5 May 1999
- Preceded by: Vasil Yitio
- Succeeded by: Yosyp Kull

Personal details
- Born: 15 June 1963 (age 63) Zavydovo, Мukachevo District, Zakarpattia Oblast, Ukrainian SSR, Soviet Union
- Party: United Centre (2008–present); Our Ukraine (2007–2008); Social Democratic Party of Ukraine (united) (1997–2000)
- Education: Lviv Commercial Academy (The Lviv institute of trade and economics)
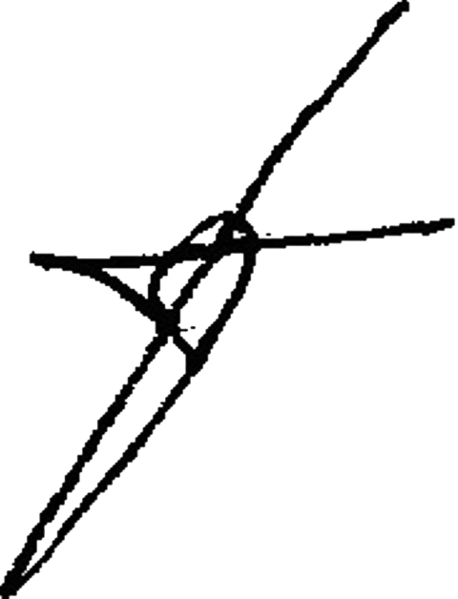
- Signature

Viktor Ivanovych Baloha (Ukrainian: Віктор Іванович Балога, born 15 June 1963) is a Ukrainian politician and a former emergency situations minister.

== Early life and education ==
Viktor Baloha was born on 15 June 1963 in the village Zavydovo, Mukachevo district, Zakarpattia Oblast, to Ivan Pavlovych Baloha and Mariya Vasilivna Baloha. He has two brothers, Ivan and Pavlo Ivanovych.

Baloha graduated from the secondary school of the village Zahattya of Іrshava district in 1980, which he attended after having finished the eight-year school in the village Zavydovo in 1978. He then enrolled at the Lviv institute of trade and economics and graduated with a degree in "Commodity science and food products trade organization" in 1984.

== Career ==
Following his compulsory military service in the Soviet Army, Baloha worked as a senior commodity expert in Beregovo Regional Consumer Society in the city of Beregovo. He continued to work as a commodity expert in various cities, rising to the position of the Chairman of the management board of LLC "Barva" in Mukachevo in 1997.

On 10 April 1998, Baloha was elected the Mayor of the city of Мukachevо and worked as a Mayor till 5 May 1999, when on 5 May 1999 he was appointed as Zakarpattia Regional State Administration Chairman.

Being against the resignation of the Prime Minister of Ukraine, Viktor Yushchenko, Baloha resigned and was subsequently discharged from the position of the Zakarpattia Regional State Administration Chairman on 1 June 2001, according to his letter of resignation. He briefly reprises his role as the Chairman of the management board of LLC "Barva".

Rejoining politics, Baloha was elected the Mayor at municipal elections and simultaneously the People's Deputy at parliamentary election on 3 April 2002. He chose to work in the Verkhovna Rada.

From 2002 to 2005, he was th People's Deputy of Ukraine for electoral district No.71, and was the member of the "Our Ukraine"(Ukrainian: Наша Україна, Nasha Ukrayina) parliamentary faction. He also was a member of the Verkhovna Rada Committee on the issues of economic policy, administration of national economy, property and investments.

In May 2004 Baloha stood for Mukachevo city Mayor Election as one of the main candidates but lost the vote. Elections were declared invalid due to electoral fraud.

During the presidential campaign Baloha became the election agent of Viktor Yushchenko in Zakarpattia, electoral district No.71. On 4 February 2005, after being elected president, Viktor Yushchenko appointed Viktor Baloha to the position of Zakarpattia Regional State Administration Chairman.

On 8 September 2005 the Verkhovna Rada of Ukraine terminated the powers of Baloha V.I. as the People's Deputy of Ukraine ahead of time according to his personal statement of resignation. Baloha was then released of his post as Zakarpattia Regional State Administration Chairman in September 2005 by president Viktor Yushchenko. He was then appointed Minister of Emergencies and Affairs of Population Protection from the Consequences of the Chernobyl Catastrophe of Ukraine, followed by being appointed to the position of the Head of the Secretariat of the President of Ukraine in 2006.

On 5 October 2006 Viktor Baloha resigned from the position of the Minister of Emergencies and Affairs of Population Protection from the Consequences of the Chernobyl Catastrophe of Ukraine. He also filed his resignation from the position of the Head of Secretariat of the President of Ukraine on Baloha's own accord and was released in May 2009. Viktor Baloha cited as the main reason for his resignation his disagreement with the decision of Yushchenko to run for president for a second term. Baloha also argued that his role had become pointless given the apathy of the President.

On 12 November 2010 the President of Ukraine Viktor Yanukovych appointed Viktor Baloha to the position of the Minister of Emergencies and Affairs of Population Protection from the Consequences of the Chernobyl Catastrophe of Ukraine.

On 9 December 2010, Yanukovych discharged Baloha from that role and instead appointed him to the position of the Minister of Emergencies of Ukraine.

The Cabinet of Ministers of Ukraine subsequently authorized Baloha to be the Head on Ukrainian part of several joint intergovernmental commissions for cooperation issues. Baloha headed various intergovernmental commissions for cooperation with the Czech Republic, Israel and Slovakia.

On 20 November 2012 Baloha resigned as emergencies minister because he preferred to take in the seat in the Ukrainian Parliament he had won in the October 2012 Ukrainian parliamentary election when he won a single-seat constituency in Zakarpattia Oblast for United Centre.

In the October 2014 Ukrainian parliamentary election, he won the same single-seat constituency (#69) as in the 2012 Ukrainian parliamentary election, but this time as an independent candidate, and thus returned to parliament.

In July 2015, Baloha was implicated in violent clashes in Zakarpattia with fellow MP Mikhail Lanyo, relating to the control of cigarette smuggling in the region.

In the 2019 Ukrainian parliamentary election Baloha was reelected as a candidate for United Centre again in constituency 69 (in Zakarpattia Oblast). In parliament he joined the For the Future faction. He left this faction on 20 December 2023.

On 1 July 2021 United Centre was renamed Andriy Baloha's Team and it became headed by Viktor Baloha's son (and mayor of Mukachevo) Andriy Baloha.

In February 2023 Baloha was banned to entry of Hungary. Baloha claimed this was done because In October 2022 a Turul (a national symbol of Hungary) located on Mukachevo's Palanok Castle was replaced by a Tryzub (a national symbol of Ukraine).

== Public activity ==
In 1997 he joined the Social Democratic Party of Ukraine (united). In 1998 during parliamentary electoral campaign Baloha was the campaign chief of the Social Democratic Party of Ukraine (united) in Zakarpattia region: the Social Democratic Party (united) received the fifth part of its votes in Zakarpattia.

Viktor Baloha supports the national movement of Rusyns (Carpatho-Rusyns), in particular he stands for recognition of Rusyns as a separate nationality in Ukraine.

In 2000 V. Baloha initiated "de-partisation" in the region and withdrew his membership in the Social Democratic Party of Ukraine (united). This initiative was supported by the then President of Ukraine Leonid Kuchma and the Prime Minister Viktor Yushchenko.

In 2007 Baloha was elected as the head of Political Council of the People's Union "Our Ukraine" party.

On 15 February 2008 Baloha declared that he withdraws the membership in the presidential People's Union "Our Ukraine". The politician stressed that "notwithstanding the circumstances" his participation in politics would be connected with the President of Ukraine Viktor Yushchenko – "a person of high principles and noble aims".

In June 2008 Viktor Baloha joined the party United Centre. Since July 2008 he is the member of the Presidium of United Centre. Since August 2010 he is the Leader of United Centre. Since 2010 up to now he is the Deputy of Zakarpattia Regional Council.

== Family involvement in politics ==
In the 2012 and 2014 Ukrainian parliamentary election Viktor Baloha's two brothers Ivan and Pavlo won parliamentary seats after winning as independent candidates constituencies in Zakarpattia Oblast. After having failed to do so in 2012, distant relative Vasyl Petiovka also won a parliamentary seat this way in 2014, meaning that the Baloha family won four out of the six single mandate constituencies of Zakarpattia Oblast. In the 2019 Ukrainian parliamentary election only Viktor Baloha and Petiovka were re-elected (Petiovka in Zakarpattia's constituency 72).

In the 2015 Ukrainian local elections Baloha's son Andriy Baloha was elected Mayor of Mukachevo. He was reelected in 2020. On 1 July 2020 Viktor Baloha's United Centre (political party) was renamed Andriy Baloha's Team and it became headed by Andriy Baloha. In January 2022 Andriy Baloha joined (former parliamentary speaker) Dmytro Razumkov's new political project. On 25 June 2024 Andriy Baloha was arrested on suspicion of corruption for "abusing their official position in order to sell at an undervalued value of land in the city center with an area of more than 3 hectares."

== Awards and honours ==
Decorated by the awards of Ukrainian Orthodox Church Moscow Patriarchate:

- The Order of the Saint Equal-to-the-Apostles Great Prince Vladimir of the first degree;
- The Order of the Saint Equal-to-the-Apostles Great Prince Vladimir of the second degree;
- The jubilee order "2000 years of the Nativity of Christ" of the first degree.
- On 23 February 2012 by state decoration of Vatican – the Pontifical Equestrian Order of St. Sylvester Pope and Martyr.

Political offices
Preceded by Oleh Rybachuk	Head of the Presidential Administration; 2006–2009	Succeeded by Vira Ulianchenko
