= Zavydovo =

Coordinates: 48°23′N 22°55′E

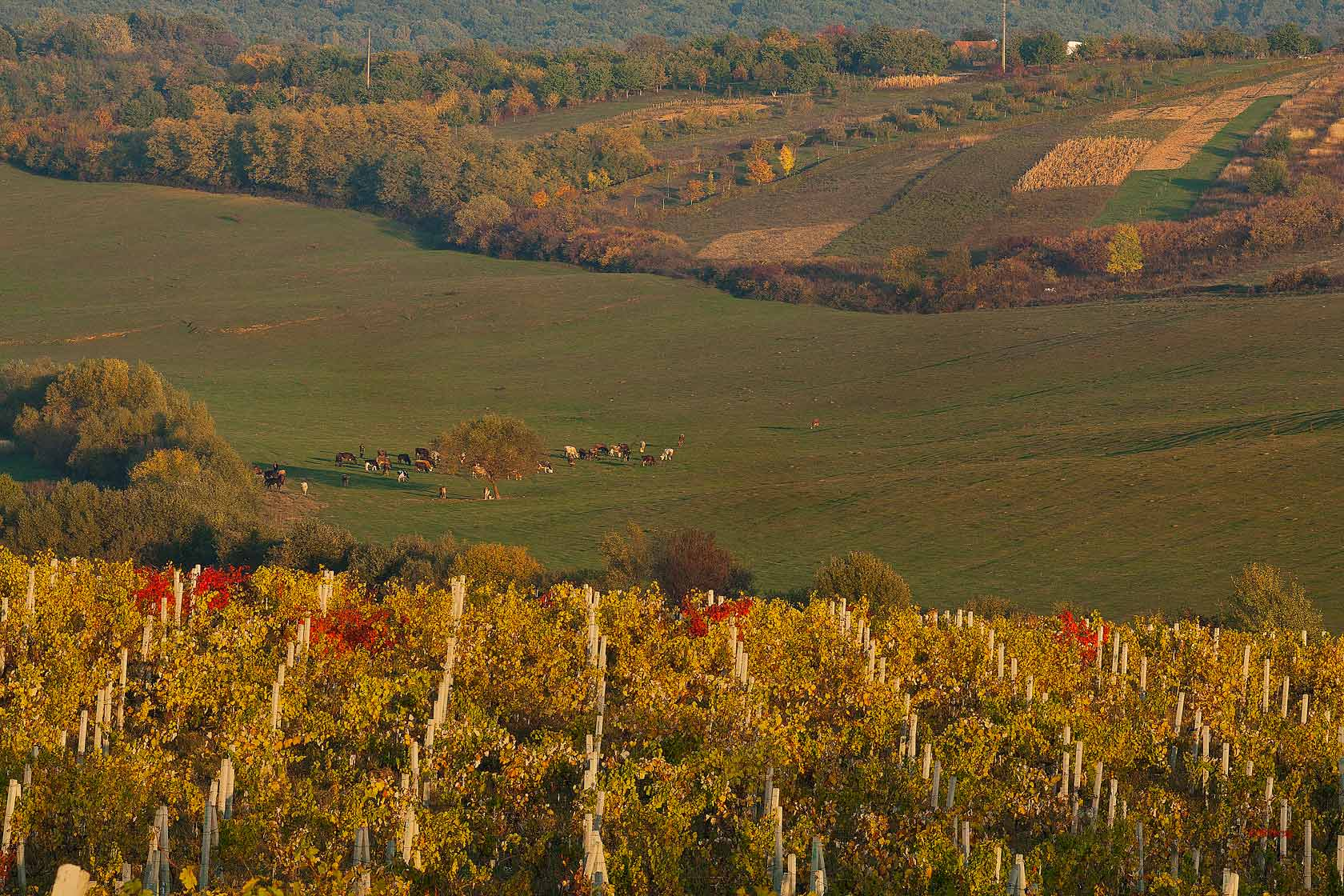
Zavydovo

Zavydovo (Ukrainian: Завидово, Hungarian: Dávidfalva) is a village of approximately 1,700 people in the Mukacheve Raion of Zakarpattia Oblast (province) in western Ukraine. The village is located approximately 20 kilometres (12 mi) from the city of Mukachevo.
