= Drohobych State Pedagogical University of Ivan Franko =

Public university in Drohobych, Ukraine

Coordinates: 49.35544°N 23.50227°E

Drohobych Ivan Franko State Pedagogical University (DSPU)
- НЗВО «Дрогобицький державний педагогічний університет імені Івана Франка» (ДДПУ)
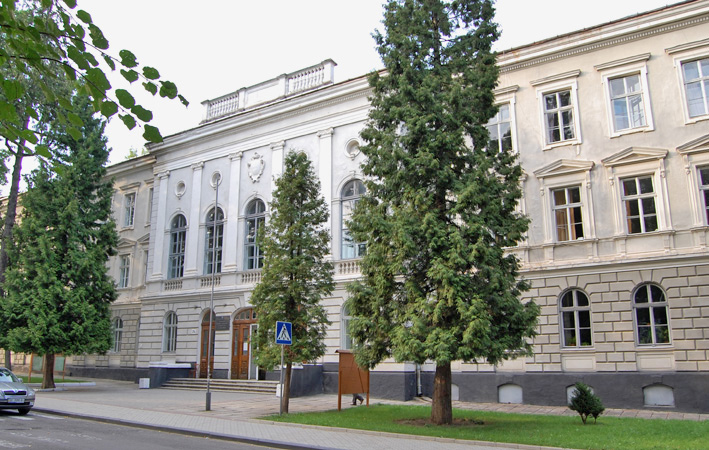
- Main university building
- Former names: Franz Joseph I Drohobych Gymnasium (1858); State Pedagogical Institute (1940)
- Type: Public university
- Established: 15 April 1940 (University) 1998
- Affiliations: Ministry of Education and Science of Ukraine
- President: Nadia Skotna
- Faculty: 583 (2016)
- Students: 5,095 (2016)
- Location: Ukraine, Lviv, Drohobych, I.Franko street, 24, 82100
- Campus: Urban area
- Website: ddpu.drohobych.net/en/

The Drohobych State Pedagogical University of Ivan Franko (Ukrainian: Дрогобицький державний педагогічний університет імені Івана Франка) or Drohobych University (Дрогобицький університет) is the only university of Lviv region located outside city of Lviv, Ukraine. It is located in the city of Drohobych. It was first established as Franz Joseph I Drohobych State gymnasium in 1858, transforming into institute and later into a university. It is the alma mater of many Ukrainian artists, politicians and scientists.

== History ==
=== Ukrainian SSR ===
- 15 April 1940 - Drohobych State Pedagogical Institute establishment (Resolution of the Ukrainian SSR № 461)
- June 1941 - in connection with the German occupation, the Institute ceased operations.
- November 1944 - institution recovered as Drohobych Teachers' Institute with the following departments: a) History; b) Physics and Mathematics; c) Language and Literature (Ukrainian language and literature and Russian language and literature).
- 1947 - the first graduation ceremony of the institute.
- 25 October 1952 - Teachers' Institute was reorganized into pedagogical (Council of Ministers Decree № 2733).
- 1954 - the Pedagogical Institute was named after Ivan Franko.
- 1 September 1956 - the Faculty of History was closed and students were transferred to the Faculty of History of Lviv University (Order of the Ukrainian SSR Ministry of Higher Education and Ministry of Education of Ukraine № 468/297, July 4, 1956).
- February 1960 - merging with the Lviv Pedagogical Institute.
- 1 September 1960 - primary school teachers training faculty establishment (Ministry of Education Decree № 266/98, 31 May 1960).
- 6 February 1962 - general scientific faculty establishment (Ministry of Education Decree № 15-23).
- 3 and 7 July 1962 - the Faculty of Foreign Languages and Music Education Faculty opening (Ministry of Education Decree № 137).
- 30 January 1968 - the general scientific department liquidation (Ministry of Education Decree № 17).
- 24 July 1968 - primary school teachers training faculty ceased operations and resumed in 1979 (Ministry of Education Decree № 202).
- 3 July 1978 - establishment of Department of general technical disciplines teaching (Ministry of Education Decree № 157).

=== Post-Independence ===
- 1992/1993 - Faculty of Management and Marketing / department of History opening
- 11 June 1992 - first post-graduates of Philology and Physical Sciences (Ministry of Education Decree № 193).
- 10 December 1997 - Faculty of Physical Education established (Ministry of Education Decree № 438).
- 1 September 1998 - Faculty of Biology established in Truskavets (Ministry of Education Decree № 22).
- 4 September 1998 - the institute gained university status (Cabinet of Ministers Decree № 1382).
- 1 September 1999 - Social Sciences and Humanities Faculty establishment. Sambor (Ministry of Education Decree № 413).
- 24 November 1999 - Faculty of postgraduate education establishment (Ministry of Education Decree № 397).
- 13 June 2004 - Faculty (now Institute) of Physics and Mathematics establishment (Ministry of Education Decree № 457).
- 16 February 2009 - first permanent doctoral specialty introduced (Ministry of Education Decree № 187).
- 12 May 2009 - department of Postgraduate studies was renamed to "department of doctoral and graduate studies".
- June 2010 - the University gained the fourth level of accreditation by Ministry of Education.

== International ties ==
The first agreement on international cooperation of DSPU was signed back in 1967 with Rzeszów High Pedagogical School (Poland). Subsequently, due to the expansion of international contacts, the institute started to work on cooperation agreements with other foreign universities. Today, Drohobych University has signed several agreements with Polish, German and Austrian universities, including:

- 2000 - Lehnytska Higher Professional School (Vitelona, Poland);
- 2001 - Warsaw Academy of Special Pedagogy (Warsaw, Poland); Podlasie Academy (Siedlce, Poland); Świętokrzyskie Academy (Kielce, Poland);
- 2002 - John Paul II Catholic University (Lublin, Poland); Polonia Academy (Częstochowa, Poland); Rzeszów University of Technology (Rzeszów, Poland); Maria Curie-Skłodowska University (Lublin, Poland); Ukrainian-Austrian Collaborating Centre for Science, Education and Culture (Austria);
- 2003 - Pedagogical Academy of Vienna (Vienna, Austria);
- 2004 - Higher School of Applied Informatics and Management (Warsaw, Poland); Polytechnic University (Lublin, Poland); University of Applied Sciences (Erfurt, Germany).
- 2007 - international organizations «DISOP», MEP (Brussels, Belgium)

== Structure ==
Today the university consists of 3 institutes, 6 faculties, two postgraduate and pre-university centres together with 42 departments. 10% of staff are Candidates of Science while 52% - docents. 23 out of total 34 programmes are accredited as ІІ – IV level (equivalent to Higher Diploma - Bachelor levels), 9 – as ІІ – ІІІ level programmes, while 2 are not accredited. Postgraduate School includes 13 specialities. As of 2016, the university has been ranked #161 in Top-200 universities of Ukraine list.

== See also ==
- Higher education in Ukraine
- List of universities in Ukraine
- Iryna Mudra
