= Carpathia =

Carpathia or Kárpátia may refer to:

== Geography and topography ==
- Carpathian Mountains, part of a mountain range in Europe
- Carpathian Ruthenia, a small historic region in Central Europe
- Montes Carpatus, a lunar mountain range
- Carpathian Basin, an alternative name for the Pannonian Basin
- Carpathia Seamount, a seamount in the North Atlantic Ocean

== Media and entertainment ==
=== Characters ===
- Nicolae Carpathia, the fictional Antichrist and head of the Global Community in Left Behind
- Vigo the Carpathian, a character in Ghostbusters II

=== Fictional places ===
- Carpathia, a fictional European kingdom in the 1957 film The Prince and the Showgirl.
- Carpathia, a fictional European country that is the home of the character Tatiana in the television series The Power.
- Carpathia, a fictional European kingdom ruled by the villainous ghost Vigo in the 1989 film Ghostbusters II.
- Carpathia, a fictional planet on the British television series Outcasts
- Carpathia, a fictionalised version of Subcarpathian Rus that briefly proclaims independence in the 1972 novel The Lost Embassy by Adam Fergusson (Collins 1972, ISBN 0 00 221487 3)
- Carpathia, a fictional Black Sea island in the 2025 film The Legend of Ochi.

=== Music ===
- Carpathian Forest, a Black metal band from Norway
- Carpathia: A Dramatic Poem, a 2005 album by German band The Vision Bleak
  - "Carpathia" (2005 single), a song on the album
- "Carpathia", a song by American band Taking Back Sunday
- "Funeral in Carpathia", a song by British extreme metal band Cradle of Filth from the 1996 album Dusk and Her Embrace
- "Titanic Calls Carpathia", a song by the international Progressive Rock band The Tangent from their 2011 album Comm
- Kárpátia (band), a Hungarian nationalist rock band.
- "Karpathia", a song by Atom and His Package from Making Love, 1989

== Other ==
- Carpathia FC, an American soccer club in Sterling Heights, Michigan
- RMS Carpathia, a steamship that rescued survivors from the RMS Titanic on April 15, 1912
- Via Carpathia, a planned transnational highway network in Lithuania and Greece

== See also ==
- Carpathian (disambiguation)
- Subcarpathia (disambiguation)
- Transcarpathia (disambiguation)
