= Zakarpattia Oblast Council =

Legislature of Zakarpattia Oblast, Ukraine

Type
- Type: Unicameral

Leadership
- Speaker: Roman SARAY, Servant of the People

Structure
- Seats: 64
- Political groups: 12 Native Zakarpattia; 11 Servant of the People; 8 Fatherland; 8 Party of Hungarians; 7 Andriy Baloha's Team; 6 European Solidarity; 6 For the Future; 6 Opposition Platform — For Life

Elections
- Last election: 25 October 2020

Meeting place
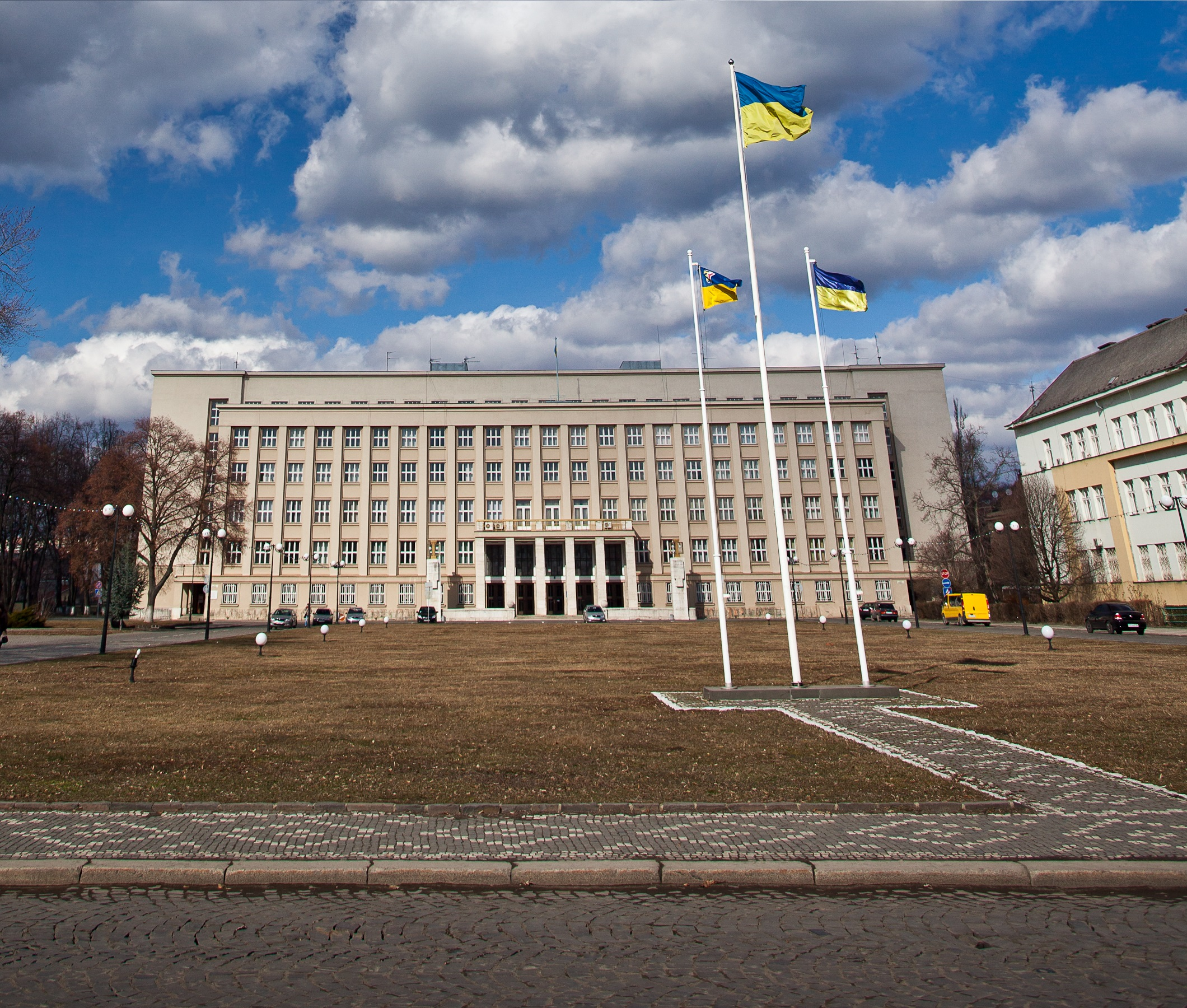
- Uzhhorod, Zakarpattia Oblast

Website
- http://zakarpat-rada.gov.ua/

The Zakarpattia Oblast Council (Ukrainian: Закарпатська обласна рада) is the regional oblast council (parliament) of the Zakarpattia Oblast (province) located in western Ukraine.

Council members are elected for five year terms. In order to gain representation in the council, a party must gain more than 5 percent of the total vote.

== Recent elections ==
=== 2025 ===
As of August 2025, 21 out of 64 deputies are in the opposition. These are 6 non-factional deputies, 8 deputies of the "Party of Hungarians of Ukraine" and 7 deputies of the "Team of Andriy Baloha".

The coalition consists of 42 deputies of the parties "Native Transcarpathia", "Servant of the People", "Fatherland", "EU", "For the Future".

=== 2020 ===
Distribution of seats #8 after the 2020 Ukrainian local elections

- 12 Native Zakarpattia
- 11 Servant of the People
- 8 Fatherland
- 8 Party of Hungarians
- 7 Andriy Baloha's Team
- 6 European Solidarity
- 6 For the Future
- 6 Opposition Platform — For Life

Election date was 25 October 2020

=== 2015 ===
Distribution of seats after the 2015 Ukrainian local elections

- 19 United Centre
- 15 Solidarity
- 11 Revival
- 8 Party of Hungarians
- 7 Fatherland
- 4 Opposition Bloc

Election date was 25 October 2015

== Chairmen ==
=== Regional executive committee ===
- Ivan Turyanytsia (1946–1951)
- Ivan Vash (1951–1952)
- Ivan Turyanytsia (1952–1955)
- Ivan Garagonich (1955–1963)
- Vasily Rusin (1963–1974)
- Mikhail Voloshchuk (1974–1984)
- Mikhail Malyovanik (1984–1990)
- Mikhail Krailo (1990)

=== Regional council ===
- Mykhailo Voloshchuk (1990–1992)
- Mykhailo Krailo (1992)
- Dmytro Dorchynets (1992–1994)
- Serhiy Ustych (1994–1998)
- Ivan Ivancho (1998–2002)
- Mykola Andrus (2002–2006)
- Mykhailo Kichkovskyi (2006–2010)
- Ivan Baloha (2010–2014)
- Volodymyr Chubirko (2014–2015)
- Mykhailo Rivis (2015–2020)
- Oleksii Petrov (2020–2021)
- Volodymyr Chubirko (2021-2023)
- Roman Saray (since 2023)
