= Dovira =

Political group in Ukraine

Trust Довіра
- Leader: Oleh Kulinich
- Chairperson: Olena Kyivets
- Parliamentary chairman: Oleh Kulinich
- Parliamentary deputy chairman: Valerii Lunchenko
- Founded: 6 December 2019 (parliamentary group); 12 June 2020 (party)
- Headquarters: Kyiv, Ukraine
- Ideology: Regionalism
- Political position: Big tent
- Member parties (in Verkhovna Rada): Our Land; Self Reliance; Bila Tserkva Together; Andriy Baloha's Team
- Colours: Blue
- Slogan: "We unite the best" (Ukrainian: «Ми об'єднуємо найкращих»)
- Verkhovna Rada: 19 / 450
- Regions: 453 / 43,122

Website
- dovira.org.ua

Dovira (Ukrainian: Довіра, pronounced [doˈwirɐ], lit. 'Сredence'), translated as Trust, is a parliamentary group in the Verkhovna Rada and political party in Ukraine, consisting of 20 previously non-partisan representatives. It was formed in the 9th Ukrainian Verkhovna Rada on 6 December 2019. On 12 June 2020, a political party of the same name was registered on the basis of the parliamentary group.

== History ==
Dovira was registered as a parliamentary group of pro-government deputies on 6 December 2019. The deputies who entered Dovira were former members of the Petro Poroshenko Bloc, the People's Front, representatives of the Our Land party, ex-regionals and a deputy from Self Reliance.

Although originally created to function solely as a parliamentary group at the national level rather than a political party, in the 2020 Ukrainian local elections, candidates representing the organization contested regional council seats and municipal positions across the country.

Twenty three of the group's mayoral candidates were elected, garnering about 3.14 percent of the total mayoral vote in Ukraine. Trust saw some success in Ternopil Oblast, where it gained six seats on the Ternopil Oblast Council. The organization saw its best result in Poltava Oblast, winning a plurality of sixteen seats on the Poltava Oblast Council. Nationally, Dovira candidates secured 459 seats on regional and municipal councils across Ukraine, out of a total of 43,122 up for election. The party obtained 1.08% of the total votes cast in the 2020 local election, putting it in thirteenth place overall. According to Ukrainian NGO Chesno and Ukrainian investigation platform Bihus.Info four Dovira faction members (Vasyl Petiovka, Valerii Lunchenko, Robert Horvat and Vladislav Poliak) developed the local Zakarpattia Oblast party Native Zakarpattia. This part won 12 of the 64 seats in the Zakarpattia Oblast Council.

== Members in parliament ==
=== Leaders ===
- Oleh Kulinich – chairman (former Revival member)
- Valerii Lunchenko – deputy chairman (former People's Front member)

=== Other members ===
- Volodymyr Areshonkov (former European Solidarity member)
- Mykola Babenko (Bila Tserkva Together)
- Pavlo Bakunets (Self Reliance)
- Serhiy Velmozhnyi (Our Land)
- Robert Horvat (former European Solidarity member)
- Maxim Efimov (former European Solidarity member)
- Andriy Ivanchuk (former People's Front member)
- Andriy Kit (independent)
- Oleksandr Kovalov (independent)
- Mykola Liushniak (former European Solidarity member)
- Vasyl Petiovka (Andriy Baloha's Team)
- Borys Prykhodko (independent)
- Oleksandr Sukhov (Our Land)
- Serhii Shakhov (Our Land)

=== Former members ===
- Valeriy Davydenko (Our Land) was a member of the group until his death on May 23, 2020.
