= Oleksandr Sukhov =

Ukrainian politician

- Олександр Сухов
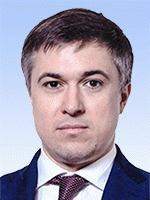
- Official portrait, 2019

People's Deputy of Ukraine
- Incumbent
- Assumed office 29 August 2019
- Preceded by: Serhiy Dunaiev
- Constituency: Luhansk Oblast, No. 107

Personal details
- Born: 20 May 1984 (age 42) Stakhanov, Ukrainian SSR, Soviet Union (now Kadiivka, Ukraine)
- Party: Independent
- Other political affiliations: Dovira; Our Land
- Education: Yaroslav Mudryi National Law University

Oleksandr Serhiyovych Sukhov (Ukrainian: Олександр Сергійович Сухов; born 20 May 1984) is a Ukrainian politician serving as a People's Deputy of Ukraine from Ukraine's 107th electoral district since 29 August 2019. An independent, he is affiliated with the Dovira parliamentary group.

== Early life and career ==
Oleksandr Serhiyovych Sukhov was born on 20 May 1984 in the city of Stakhanov (now Kadiivka), then under the Soviet Union. He graduated from the Yaroslav Mudryi National Law University, and worked for over a decade as a prosecutor. In 2016, he was a prosecutor at the Kyiv Oblast prosecutor's office. Sukhov was additionally a managing partner at the Velmozhnyi and Partners law offices.

== Political career ==
Prior to his election as a People's Deputy of Ukraine, Sukhov was head of the Our Land party in Lysychansk, as well as an assistant to Serhii Shakhov, a People's Deputy in the 8th Ukrainian Verkhovna Rada (parliament).

Sukhov ran in the 2019 Ukrainian parliamentary election as an independent candidate for People's Deputy of Ukraine in Ukraine's 107th electoral district. He was successfully elected, winning 28.80% of the vote compared to the next-closest candidate (Oleksandr Sorokin of Servant of the People)'s 18.78% of the vote.

As a People's Deputy, Sukhov joined the Dovira parliamentary group on 6 December 2019. He is a member of the Verkhovna Rada Transport and Infrastructure Committee.
