= Serhiy Velmozhnyi =

Ukrainian politician (born 1976)

- Сергій Вельможний
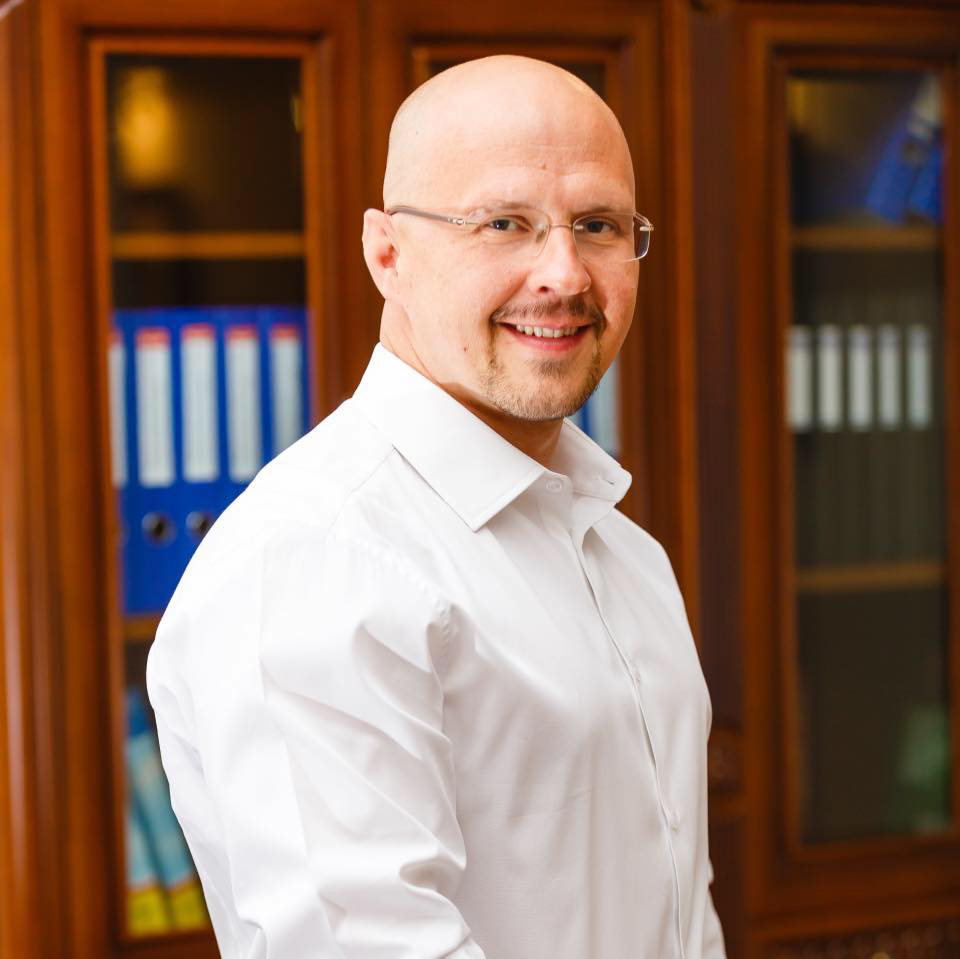
- Velmozhnyi in 2020

People's Deputy of Ukraine
- Incumbent
- Assumed office 29 August 2019
- Preceded by: Yuliy Ioffe
- Constituency: Luhansk Oblast, No. 112

Personal details
- Born: 25 June 1976 (age 50) Kadiivka, Ukrainian SSR, Soviet Union (now Kadiivka, Ukraine)
- Party: Our Land
- Other political affiliations: Dovira (since 2019)

Serhiy Anatoliyovych Velmozhnyi (Ukrainian: Сергій Анатолійович Вельможний; born 25 June 1976) is a Ukrainian politician currently serving as a People's Deputy of Ukraine from Ukraine's 112th electoral district since 29 August 2019. He is a member of the Dovira parliamentary group, having been elected as an independent.

== Early life and career ==
Serhiy Anatoliyovych Velmozhnyi was born on 25 June 1976 in the city of Kadiivka, in Ukraine's eastern Luhansk Oblast (known as Stakhanov from 1978 to 2016). He has achieved higher education, and is a candidate of judicial science. He formerly served as head advisor of the Serhii Shakhov Foundation, a charitable organisation.

Velmozhnyi is the founding member of the Velmozhnyi and Partners legal organisation. Prior to founding Velmozhnyi and Partners, he worked in law enforcement. He is also head of the Rubizhne chapter of the Our Land party.

== People's Deputy of Ukraine ==
In the 2019 Ukrainian parliamentary election, Velmozhnyi ran for the office of People's Deputy of Ukraine from Ukraine's 112th electoral district. He was successfully elected, defeating 12 challengers with 34.32% of the vote (his next-closest opponent, Oleksandr Chernetsov of Opposition Platform — For Life, won 30.41% of the vote). He participated in the election as an independent, though he is a member of Our Land.

In the Verkhovna Rada (Ukraine's parliament), Velmozhnyi joined the Dovira parliamentary group on 6 December 2019. He was a member of the Verkhovna Rada Legal Committee until 5 October 2022, when he left to join the Verkhovna Rada Committee on Transport and Infrastructure.

In 2020, amidst the COVID-19 pandemic in Ukraine, it was announced by Serhii Shakhov that Velmozhnyi had fallen ill with COVID-19.
