= Kyiv Oblast Council =

Legislature of Kyiv Oblast, Ukraine

Kyiv Oblast Council Київська обласна рада

Type
- Type: Unicameral
- Houses: 1

Structure
- Seats: 84
- Political groups: Government (61): European Solidarity (25); Servant of the People (22); For the Future (14); Opposition (23): Fatherland (14); Former members of Opposition Platform — For Life (9) (Note: Banned in Ukraine since 2022.)

Elections
- Last election: 25 October 2020

Meeting place
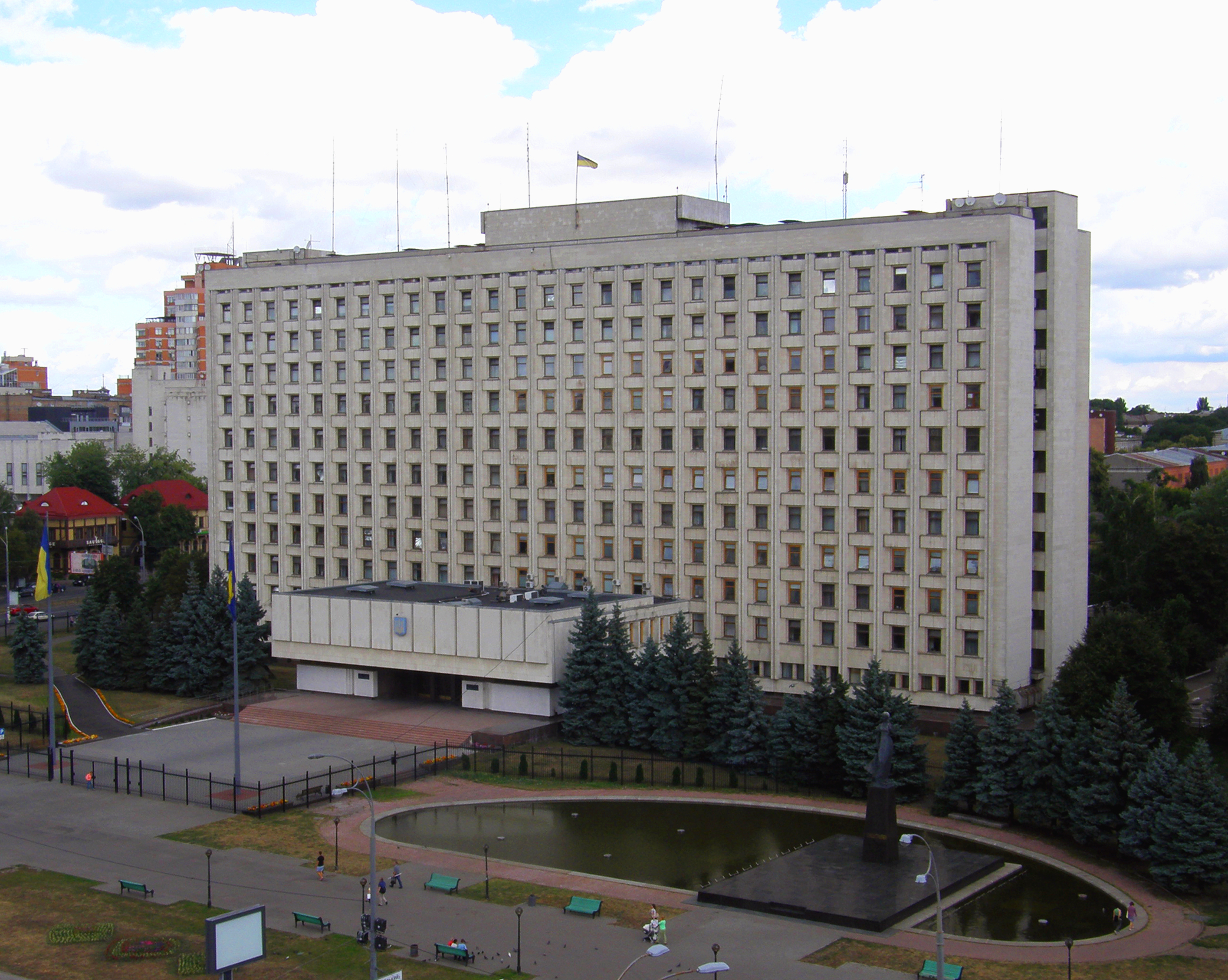
- Lesya Ukrainka street, Lutsk Kyiv, Kyiv Oblast

Website
- http://kor.gov.ua/

The Kyiv Oblast Council (Ukrainian: Київська обласна рада) is the regional oblast council (parliament) of the Kyiv Oblast (province) located in central Ukraine.

Council members are elected for five year terms. In order to gain representation in the council, a party must gain more than 5 percent of the total vote.

== Recent elections ==
=== 2020 ===
Distribution of seats after the 2020 Ukrainian local elections

- 25 European Solidarity
- 22 Servant of the People
- 14 For the Future
- 14 Fatherland
- 9 Opposition Platform — For Life

Election date was 25 October 2020

=== 2015 ===
Distribution of seats after the 2015 Ukrainian local elections

- 22 Solidarity
- 16 Fatherland
- 10 Self Reliance
- 9 Radical Party
- 7 UKROP
- 7 Our Land
- 7 Svoboda
- 6 Opposition Bloc

Election date was 25 October 2015

== Chairmen ==
=== Regional executive committee ===
- Marko Vasilenko (1932–1937)
- Nikolay Kurach (acting, 1937–1938)
- Vasily Starchenko (acting, 1938)
- Efim Kobzin (acting, 1938–1939)
- Trofim Kostyuk (1939–1941)
- Zakhar Oleinik (1943–1950)
- Nikita Bubnovsky (1950–1951)
- Ivan Stafiychuk (1951–1963)
- Grigoriy Yaremchuk (industrial, 1963–1964)
- Ivan Lysenko (agrarian, 1963–1964)
- Ivan Stafiychuk (1964–1967)
- Ivan Lysenko (1967–1984)
- Ivan Plyushch (1984–1990)
- Vasyl Sinko (1990–1992)

=== Regional council ===
- Ivan Plyushch (1990)
- Vasyl Sinko (1990–1998)
- Mykola Baranyuk (1998–2000)
- Anatoliy Zasukha (2000–2001)
- Mykola Baranyuk (2001–2003)
- Mykola Pryimachenko (2003–2004)
- Anatoliy Zasukha (2004–2005)
- Mykola Pryimachenko (acting, 2005–2006)
- Volodymyr Maybozhenko (2006–2010)
- Oleksandr Kachnyi (2010–2014)
- Mykola Babenko (2014–2015)
- Hanna Starikova (2015–2019)
- Mykola Starychenko (2019–2020)
- Oleksandr Sklyarov (2020–2021)
- Natalia Gunko (2021–2023)
