= Borys Prykhodko =

Ukrainian politician

- Борис Приходько
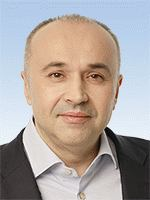
- Official portrait, 2019

People's Deputy of Ukraine
- Incumbent
- Assumed office 29 August 2019
- Preceded by: Oleh Dmytrenko
- Constituency: Chernihiv Oblast, No. 210

Personal details
- Born: 23 January 1973 (age 53) Losynivka, Ukrainian SSR, Soviet Union (now Ukraine)
- Party: Dovira
- Other political affiliations: Independent; Our Land
- Education: Kyiv National Economic University

Borys Viktorovych Prykhodko (Ukrainian: Борис Вікторович Приходько; born 23 January 1973) is a Ukrainian banker and politician currently serving as a People's Deputy of Ukraine representing Ukraine's 210th electoral district as an independent member of Dovira since 2019. He previously served as first deputy chairman of the National Bank of Ukraine from 2012 to 2014.

== Early life and career ==
Borys Viktorovych Prykhodko was born on 23 January 1973 in the town of Losynivka, in northern Ukraine. He graduated from the Kyiv National Economic University's financial and economic faculty in 1994. Beginning in 1993, he worked in the banking industry; from 1993 to 2001 he worked at Ukrayina bank, from 2001 to 2003 at Khreshchatyk bank, and from 2008 to 2012 as director of the treasury at the State Savings Bank of Ukraine. Prior to his election, he also worked in the strawberry growing industry from 2014.

== Banking career ==
On 17 December 2012, Prykhodko was appointed as first deputy chairman of the National Bank of Ukraine. He served in the position until 2014, when he was fired as part of lustration against members of the government of Viktor Yanukovych. He was subsequently arrested by the Prosecutor General of Ukraine and accused of misappropriating ₴2 billion from the agricultural fund, with a bail set at ₴200 million. In 2016, he was found innocent by the Kyiv Regional Administrative Court, which additionally ordered that the National Bank of Ukraine return his job. On 3 March 2016, the latter order was overturned by the Kyiv Court of Appeals.

On 12 October 2020, Prykhodko sued the National Bank, demanding ₴7 million for material damages caused as a result of his firing.

== Political career ==
During the 2019 Ukrainian parliamentary election, Prykhodko ran as an independent to become a People's Deputy of Ukraine in Ukraine's 210th electoral district, located in Chernihiv Oblast. He was elected, defeating the next-closest candidate, Serhiy Korovchenko, by a difference of only 38 votes. In the aftermath of the election, a legal battle ensued in court, during which it was determined that up to 5% of votes from an elderly care home in the district could have been falsified. Eventually, the Central Election Commission of Ukraine took counting votes into its own hands, declaring Prykhodko the winner on 16 August 2019.

In the Verkhovna Rada (national parliament of Ukraine), Prykhodko joined the Dovira parliamentary group, as well as the Verkhovna Rada Economic Development Committee.

Prykhodko was successfully elected to the Chernihiv Oblast Council concurrently with his People's Deputy role in the 2020 Ukrainian local elections as a member of Our Land.
