= Bila Tserkva Together =

Bila Tserkva Together Біла Церква разом
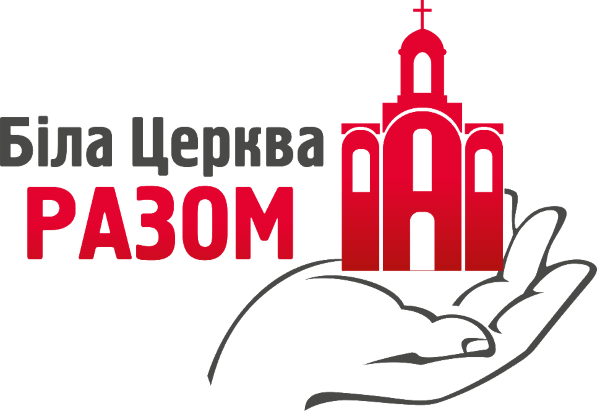
- Leader: Volodymyr Herasymchuk
- Leader in Verkhovna Rada: Mykola Babenko
- Founder: Halyna Marchenko
- Founded: 18 November 2007 (Right Will of Ukraine); 24 May 2018 (Bila Tserkva Together)
- Registered: 14 January 2008
- Headquarters: Ivana Mazepy 3, Kyiv, Ukraine. 04212
- Ideology: Bila Tserkva regionalism
- Verkhovna Rada affiliation: Trust
- Colours: White; Red
- Verkhovna Rada: 1 / 450
- Regions: 9 / 43,122

Website
- Facebook page

Bila Tserkva Together (Ukrainian: Біла Церква разом, romanized: Bila Tserkva razom) is a political party in Ukraine. Registered by the Ministry of Justice of Ukraine on 14 January 2008 as the Right Will of Ukraine, it became the 142nd political party registered in Ukraine. In May 2018, the party was renamed Bila Tserkva Together, and became a regional political organization active in the city of Bila Tserkva in Central Ukraine.

== History ==
The party took part in the 2019 Ukrainian parliamentary election in one constituency, where it won a parliamentary seat. In electoral district 90, located in Bila Tserkva, Mykola Babenko won his seat in parliament with 28.23% of the votes (runner up Yurii Nesterchuk of the Servant of the People party gained 16.01% of the votes).

Vasyl Khmelnytsky, a Ukrainian oligarch, provides much of the party's financial support.

== See also ==
- List of political parties in Ukraine
