= Valeriy Davydenko =

Ukrainian businessman and politician (1973–2020)

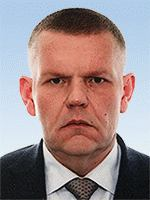

People's Deputy of Ukraine

9th convocation
- In office 29 August 2019 – 23 May 2020
- Constituency: Zastup No. 1

8th convocation
- In office 24 November 2014 – 24 July 2019

Personal details
- Born: 16 March 1973 Nosivka, Chernihiv Oblast, Ukrainian SSR, Soviet Union
- Died: 23 May 2020 (aged 47) Kyiv, Ukraine
- Party: Zastup; Our Land
- Children: 2
- Education: National University of Food Technologies

Valeriy Mykolaiovych Davydenko (Ukrainian: Валерій Миколайович Давиденко, 16 March 1973 – 23 May 2020) was a Ukrainian businessman and politician. He was found shot dead in the bathroom of his office on 23 May 2020.

== Early life and education ==
Born in Nosivka Chernihiv Oblast in 1973, Davydenko graduated from the National University of Food Technologies with a degree in mechanical engineering of food production equipment.

== Career ==
From the late 1990s to the early 2000s, he worked as an insurance specialist. From 2004 to 2013, Davydenko was General Director of an agricultural company which was founded in 2003 by Davydenko's mother and the future Minister of Finance of Ukraine, Yuriy Kolobov. In 2020, fellow former member of parliament Andriy Verevskyi also had a stake in this company. Davydenko, Kolobov and member of parliament Borys Prykhodko were former owners of the bankrupt and liquidated Terra Bank.

In May 2013, Davydenko was appointed Deputy Minister of Agrarian Policy and Food in the second Azarov government (Yuriy Kolobov was Minister of Finance in this government). He was fired in March 2014 after the 2014 Ukrainian revolution that was the end of the presidency of Viktor Yanukovych.

Davydenko was first elected to the Ukrainian parliament in the 2014 parliamentary election for the party Zastup. He won the party's only seat when as an unaffiliated candidate in the 208th single-member constituency located in Bakhmach. He won with 38.86% of the vote. During the parliamentary campaign, public observers stated they had allegedly recorded voter bribery for Davydenko. Zastup claimed this had been a provocation. Davydenko later joined the parliamentary faction of Petro Poroshenko Bloc. Davydenko was re-elected, after again a win in the 208th constituency (with 37.43% of the vote) but this time as an independent candidate, in the 2019 Ukrainian parliamentary election. A few months before his death, Davydenko was co-chairman of the political party Our Land. After the 2019 parliamentary election, Davydenko joined the Trust (parliamentary group) faction.

== Death ==
Davydenko and his wife had two daughters. Davydenko was found shot dead in the bathroom of his office in Kyiv on 23 May 2020.

On 25 October 2020 Anatoliy Hunko from Servant of the People won the early election, called to replace Davydenko, in constituency 208 with 34.10% of the vote. Davydenko's wife Lyudmyla took 3rd place in the election with 26.68% of the vote.

== See also ==
- List of members of the Verkhovna Rada of Ukraine who died in office
