= Oleh Kulinich =

Ukrainian politician (born 1966)

- Олег Кулініч
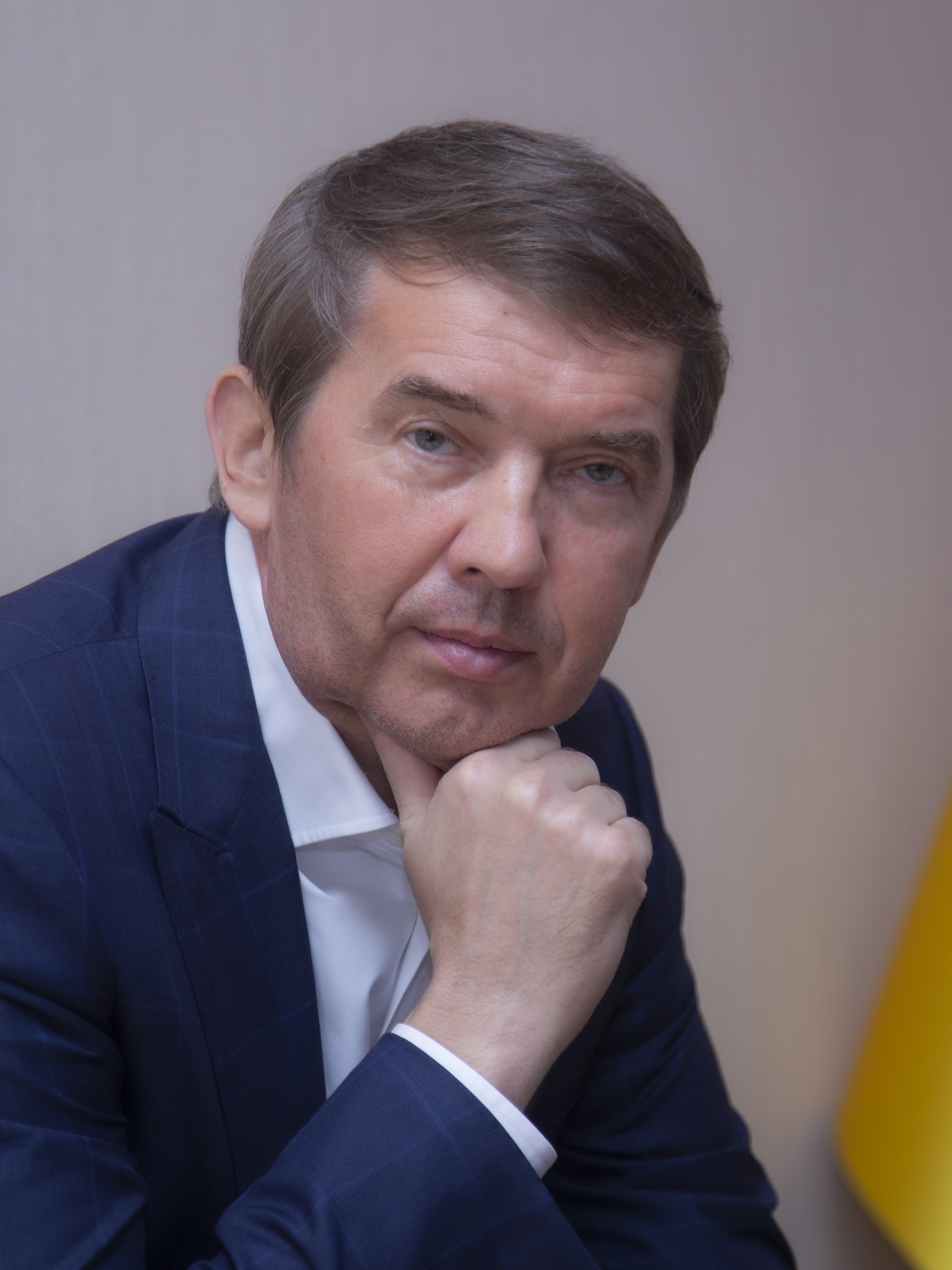
- Kulinich in 2021

People's Deputy of Ukraine
- Incumbent
- Assumed office 12 December 2012
- Preceded by: Constituency established
- Constituency: Poltava Oblast, No. 147

Poltava Oblast Deputy
- In office March 2002 – 12 December 2012

Personal details
- Born: 25 November 1966 (age 59) Zinkiv, Ukrainian SSR, Soviet Union
- Party: Dovira (2019–present)
- Other political affiliations: Party of Regions (2012–2014); Revival (2014–2018)
- Education: Poltava University of Economics and Trade

Oleh Ivanovych Kulinich (Ukrainian: Олег Іванович Кулініч; born 25 November 1966) is a Ukrainian politician currently serving as a People's Deputy of Ukraine in the 9th Ukrainian Verkhovna Rada (parliament), having previously served in the seventh and eighth convocations. He is the head of the Dovira group in the Verkhovna Rada.

== Education ==
Kulinich studied at the Commodity Faculty of the Poltava Cooperative Institute (now Poltava University of Economics and Trade) where he graduated in 1991.

== Career ==
After his graduation in 1984, he worked in a collective farm, and later in the army (1984–86) and as a freight forwarder for a bakery.

After obtaining higher education in October 1991, he worked as the deputy head of the Zheleznogorsk district consumer union of the Kursk Oblast of the Russian Federation.

From October 1992 to September 1995, he was deputy director of trade at the commercial enterprise Torgovy Tsentr in the Kursk Oblast.

In October 1995, Kulinich returned to Ukraine and started his own business, trading in fuel and lubricants in Zinkiv, Poltava Oblast and building to gas stations. In 2012, the business was sold off.

In December 2001, he founded the agricultural private limited company Oktan in the Zinkiv Raion of the Poltava Oblast. The business works in the cultivation and sale of plant products, as well as animal husbandry.

== Political career ==
In March 2002, he was first elected a deputy of the Poltava Oblast Council. In the Poltava Oblast Council of the fourth convocation, he joined the Permanent Commission on Investment, Construction, Housing and Communal Services and Ecology.

In March 2006, he was re-elected to the regional council for a second term, where he worked in the permanent committee on budget, entrepreneurship and property management.

In 2010, he became a deputy of the Poltava Oblast Council for the third time. In the regional council of the sixth convocation, he joined the permanent commission on fuel and energy complex and subsoil use and was elected its secretary.

In the 2012 parliamentary election he was elected as a People's Deputy of Ukraine of the 7th convocation in electoral district No. 147 as a non-party candidate with a result of 43.32%. In this connection, he prematurely terminated his duties as a deputy of the regional council. In December 2012, he joined the pro-Russian Party of Regions faction and became a member of the Committee of the Verkhovna Rada of Ukraine on Agrarian Policy and Land Relations.

In the 2014 parliamentary election he was elected as a People's Deputy of Ukraine for single-mandate electoral district No. 147 as a self-nominator. He won 21.19% of the vote.

In the 2019 parliamentary election, he was elected a People's Deputy for the 147th electoral district for the third time with 37.79% of the vote.

In the Parliament of the seventh and eighth convocations, he was a member of the VRU Committee on Agrarian Policy and Land Relations.

In May 2016, he was appointed Chairman of the Subcommittee on Land Relations of the Committee of the Verkhovna Rada of Ukraine on Agrarian policy and Land Relations.

In the Parliament of the ninth convocation he joined the Committee on Finance, Tax and Customs Policy.

In various years he was a member of groups on inter-parliamentary relations with the Czech Republic (2019), Hungary (2020), the United Arab Emirates, China (2020), Romania (2020), and Tunisia (2021).

Kulinich was the head of the Dovira parliamentary group.

On 26 December 2018, the Russian Federation included Kulinich in the sanctions list.

== Legislative activity ==
He is the author of several laws and draft laws:

- Law on granting powers to notaries to register land lease rights
- Law on land auctions
- Law on Lands of Deceased Heritage
- Law on Land Consolidation

He was the author and co-author of laws on deregulation in the agro-industrial sector, on requirements for organic production, on the transfer of part of the rent from oil and gas production to local budgets, a number of laws aimed at supporting farming, harmonization of Ukrainian legislation with EU legislation, optimization of tax legislation, safety and quality food products.

== Ratings ==
As of 8 February 2017, he submitted the largest number of amendments that were approved by the Agrarian Committee.

In the 8th session of the Verkhovna Rada, Kulinich took 8th place among the ten most effective deputies. He initiated 2 of his own draft laws and 4 co-authored ones, which were adopted.

In the ranking of the 100 most influential Ukrainians of 2020, according to Focus magazine, he was in 25th place.

According to the analysis of the work of the Parliament in 2020 by the civil network "Opora", Kulinich demonstrated the highest indicators of participation in the votes of the council.

== Criticism ==
In past convocations of the Verkhovna Rada, he was seen several times for impersonal voting.

He was one of the 59 deputies who signed the petition, on the basis of which the Constitutional Court of Ukraine canceled the article of the Criminal Code of Ukraine on illegal enrichment, which obliged civil servants to give explanations about the sources of their income and the income of their family members. Criminal liability for illegal enrichment was introduced in Ukraine in 2015. This was one of the requirements of the EU for the implementation of the Visa Liberalization Action Plan, as well as one of Ukraine's obligations to the IMF, established by a memorandum.

With the assistance of Kulinich, a free concert of the band "TiK" took place in the village of Dykanka, Poltava region, during the election campaign to the Verkhovna Rada. During the election campaign, Kulinich opened 15 playgrounds on the territory of the 147th electoral district (Poltava region), built at his own expense.

He was mentioned in the list of deputies who did not enter information about their own business in the declarations for 2014.

== Charity ==
Kulinich financed a program that installed over 200 playgrounds in various settlements.

== Personal life ==
Kulinich is married and has one daughter.
