= Ukrainian Jewish Committee =

Jewish organisation in Ukraine

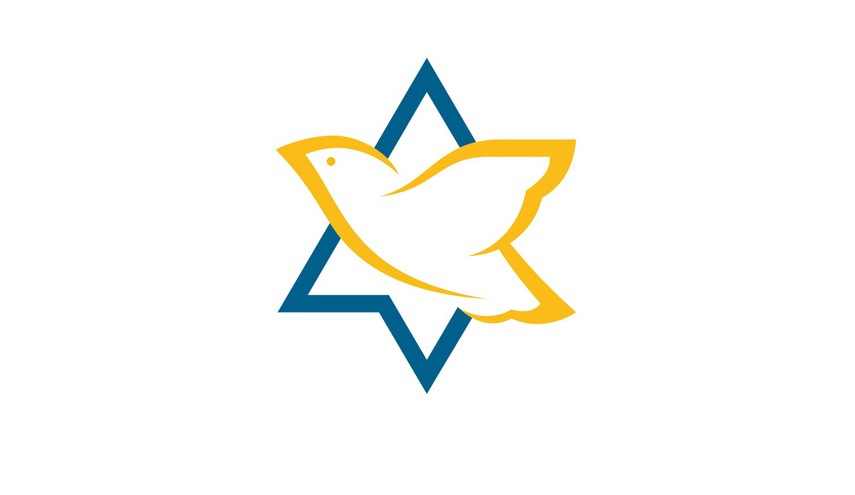
Logo

The Ukrainian Jewish Committee is a Kyiv-based organization representing Ukrainian Jews. Its director general is Eduard Dolinsky, and its president is the Ukrainian MP Oleksandr Feldman. It was created in 2008 to fight against anti-Semitism, xenophobia and racism. It opposes attempts to heroize war criminals and accomplices of the Holocaust, denying and distorting the history of the Holocaust. It promotes dialogue between world religions and supports the State of Israel.

In March 2014, O. Feldman announced that on April 2, 2014, "the Ukrainian Jewish Committee will host its fourth annual interfaith national forum, with the participation of participants from 50 countries, to discuss anti-Semitism" ("the Ukrainian Jewish Committee will host its fourth annual interfaith national forum, featuring participants from 50 countries coming together to discuss anti-Semitism").
