= Vira Ulianchenko =

Ukrainian politician (born 1958)

- Віра Ульянченко
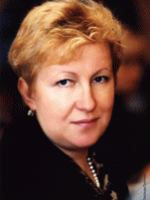
- Ulianchenko in 2002

Head of Presidential Administration
- In office May 19, 2009 – February 24, 2010
- President: Viktor Yushchenko
- Preceded by: Viktor Baloha
- Succeeded by: Serhiy Lyovochkin

Governor of Kyiv Oblast
- In office June 16, 2006 – May 20, 2009
- President: Viktor Yushchenko
- Preceded by: Valeri Kondruk
- Succeeded by: Viktor Vakarash

People's Deputy of Ukraine
- In office March 2005 – May 2006

Personal details
- Born: Vira Ivanivna Ulianchenko; February 1, 1958 (age 68) Bobrovytsia Raion, Chernihiv Oblast, Ukrainian SSR
- Party: Zastup
- Other political affiliations: Our Ukraine; KP(b)U
- Spouse: Viktor Ivchenko
- Children: Maria-Viktoria
- Education: Kyiv University
- Occupation: Politician, administrator

Vira Ivanivna Ulianchenko (Ukrainian: Віра Іванівна Ульянченко; born 1 February 1958) is a Ukrainian state and political activist. She is the only female governor in a history of Kyiv Oblast since its establishment in 1932.

== Biography ==
In 1980 she graduated from the Philology Department of Kyiv University after which she worked as a teacher at the professional technical college (PTU) #4 in Kyiv city. In 1981 Ulianchenko became a Komsomol activist.

In 1987 Ulianchenko was elected a deputy to the municipal raion council of Soviet Raion of Kyiv city and a deputy head of the Soviet Raion executive committee. In May 1990 she started working at the local office of the Communist Party committee. From 1991 to 1993 Ulianchenko as an administrator worked in various government institutions Verkhovna Rada, Cabinet of Ministers of Ukraine, and Presidential Administration Secretariat.

From 1993 to 1994 Ulianchenko worked for a water transportation company "Blasko". Soon after the legal proceedings around the company she emigrated to the United States. However, Ulianchenko claims that she moved there to give birth to her child. In 1999 she began serving as the chief of department for the Ukrsoyuzservis. In March 2000 she worked for the Prime minister office chaired by Viktor Yushchenko. In 2002 Ulianchenko was a secretary for the political bloc Our Ukraine in Verkhovna Rada.

In March 2005 Ulianchenko was elected a deputy to Verkhovna Rada as part of the political bloc Our Ukraine, which she served until May 2006. In June 2006 she was appointed the Governor of Kyiv Oblast. On May 16, 2009, Ulianchenko became the leader of Our Ukraine and few days later a head of Presidential Administration. As the head of Presidential Administration she was noticed for her quick reaction on the announcement of the President of Russian Federation Dmitri Medvedev to the President of Ukraine Viktor Yushchenko. For her loyalty, reliance, and solid professional performance Ulianchenko was nicknamed as "mama Vera". On February 24, 2010, Ulianchenko resigned on her own initiative.

In 2009 the Ukrainian magazine Фокус named Ulianchenko as the second most influential woman in Ukraine after Yulia Tymoshenko. Ulianchenko replaced at that position another bright Ukrainian female politician Raisa Bogatyrova.

In the 2014 parliamentary elections Ulianchenko headed the election list of Zastup.

Ukraine’s State Security Service has issued a search warrant for former governor of Kyiv Regional State Administration Vira Ulianchenko, the Interior Ministry reported on its official website on the 14th September 2015. According to the official information, Ulianchenko disappeared in Kyiv on June 30 and is hiding from the prosecution.

Spouse

Her husband Viktor Ivchenko held a chair of the State Agency of investments and innovations.

Quotes

I am not so all-mighty as they say. Besides, the President is not out of such people that are so easy influenced.

(Фокус, 2007)

Political offices
Preceded by Viktor Baloha	Head of the Presidential Administration; 2009–2010	Succeeded by Serhiy Lyovochkin
