= Mykola Liushniak =

Ukrainian politician and entrepreneur

- Микола Люшняк
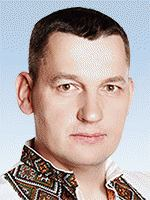
- Official portrait, 2019

People's Deputy of Ukraine
- Incumbent
- Assumed office 27 November 2014
- Preceded by: Mykhailo Apostol
- Constituency: Ternopil Oblast, No. 166

Personal details
- Born: 8 February 1974 (age 52) Berezhany, Ukrainian SSR, Soviet Union (now Ukraine)
- Party: Dovira
- Other political affiliations: Ukrainian Democratic Alliance for Reform (2012); European Solidarity (2014); Independent

Mykola Volodymyrovych Liushniak (Ukrainian: Мико́ла Володи́мирович Люшня́к; born 8 February 1974) is a Ukrainian public and political figure and businessman. Candidate of Agricultural Sciences (2010). People's Deputy of Ukraine of the 8th and 9th convocations.

Member of the temporary investigative commission of the Verkhovna Rada to investigate possible illegal actions of government officials and others who could contribute to the violation of state sovereignty, territorial integrity and inviolability of Ukraine and pose a threat to national security of Ukraine (19 May 2021).

== Biography ==
As a member of the UDAR political party, was a candidate in the single-mandate constituency No. 166 from the UDAR party in the 2012 elections to the Verkhovna Rada of Ukraine.

Mykola Lyushnyak received 49,526 votes or 40.48% in the 2014 elections to the Verkhovna Rada of Ukraine in the single-mandate constituency No. 166 in the Ternopil region. The main rival, Mykhailo Apostol, a People's Deputy from the constituency at the time, stated that the results of the voting had been falsified at a press conference at the Ternopil Press Club. According to the results of the voting, he became a People's Deputy of Ukraine.

Non-partisan, in the Verkhovna Rada of the 9th convocation he is a member of Dovira.
