= Serhiy Dunaiev =

Ukrainian politician and businessman (born 1973)

- Сергій Дунаєв
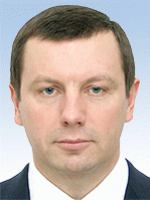
- A picture of him from 2019.

People's Deputy of Ukraine
- Incumbent
- Assumed office 29 August 2019
- Constituency: Opposition Platform — For Life, No. 9 (Note: The party has been banned since 2022.)
- In office 27 November 2014 – 29 August 2019
- Constituency: Luhansk Oblast, No. 107
- In office 12 December 2012 – 27 November 2014
- Succeeded by: Oleksandr Sukhov
- Constituency: Luhansk Oblast, No. 107

Mayor of Lysychansk
- In office 16 October 2009 – 22 November 2012
- Preceded by: Leonid Krysanov
- Succeeded by: Vitaliy Shvedov (acting) (Note: The position remained technically vacant until Shvedov was appointed as Head of the Military Administration of the city of Lysychansk in September 2015 due to military law following Lysychansk's recapture from separatists in July 2014. It took until September 2015 for Sergey Shilin to officially succeed him in full as mayor.)

Personal details
- Born: Serhiy Vladimirovich Dunaiev; 19 August 1973 (age 53) Lysychansk, Ukrainian SSR, Soviet Union
- Party: Party of Regions (2006-2014); Opposition Bloc (2014-2019); Opposition Platform - For Life (2019-2022); Platform for Life and Peace (2022-present)
- Education: Academy of Professional Development and Retraining of Educators (2009); East Ukrainian National University

Serhiy Vladimirovich Dunaiev (Ukrainian: Сергій Володимирович Дунаєв; born 19 August 1973) is a Ukrainian politician who has been serving as a People's Deputy of Ukraine in the Verkhovna Rada since August 2019. Previously, he served in the Rada from 2012 to 2014 and again from 2014 to 2019, and was also Mayor of Lysychansk from 2009 to 2012 prior to entering national politics.

== Early life ==
Dunaiev was born on 19 August 1973 in the city of Lysychansk, which was then part of the Ukrainian SSR in the Soviet Union. According to Dunaiev, he played badminton competitively as a child after moving to the Stekolnyi district of Lysychansk. He was coached by Olha Mikhailovna, and reached the all-junior USSR Championship in the Kazakh SSR. However, he quit before reaching the adult level due to his father dying, which forced him to remain in Lysychansk and not move to other cities like Kyiv and Odesa to be coached professionally. After this, he immediately entered the workforce and became an assembly worker at BMP No. 392 in 1991. Dunaiev remained there for only two years before becoming an economic security inspector for PITTO in 1994. He left PITTO in 1995 to become a self-employed private entrepreneur, which he did until 1998. He re-entered the workforce in 1998 and was then appointed Deputy Director for Commercial Affairs of the enterprise "OSA". After a year, he was promoted to director of "OSA" in 1999, but he held the directorship for only a year, until 2000, when he moved to become director of the enterprise "LEGION". Dunaiev remained at "LEGION" until 2006, and, in 2002, was simultaneously appointed general director of the enterprise "OLVI". He left "OLVI" in 2007, just a year after he was appointed Director of the "Energy Investment Company", later renamed "Energopromtex", in 2006. Dunaiev remained at Energopromtex until his election as mayor in 2009, after which he was forced to leave. Shortly before leaving, in July 2009, it was reported in the media that Dunaiev had bought the Lysychansk Glass Factory from Vasyl Khmelnytsky.

== Political career ==
=== Lysychansk City Council (2006-2009) ===
In 2006, he became a deputy of the Lysychansk City Council from the Party of Regions. During his time in the council, he served as chairman of one of the four standing commissions of the council. He served for a little over three years until he was elected Mayor of Lysychansk, which forced him to give up his mandate in the city council.

=== Mayor of Lysychansk (2009-2012) ===
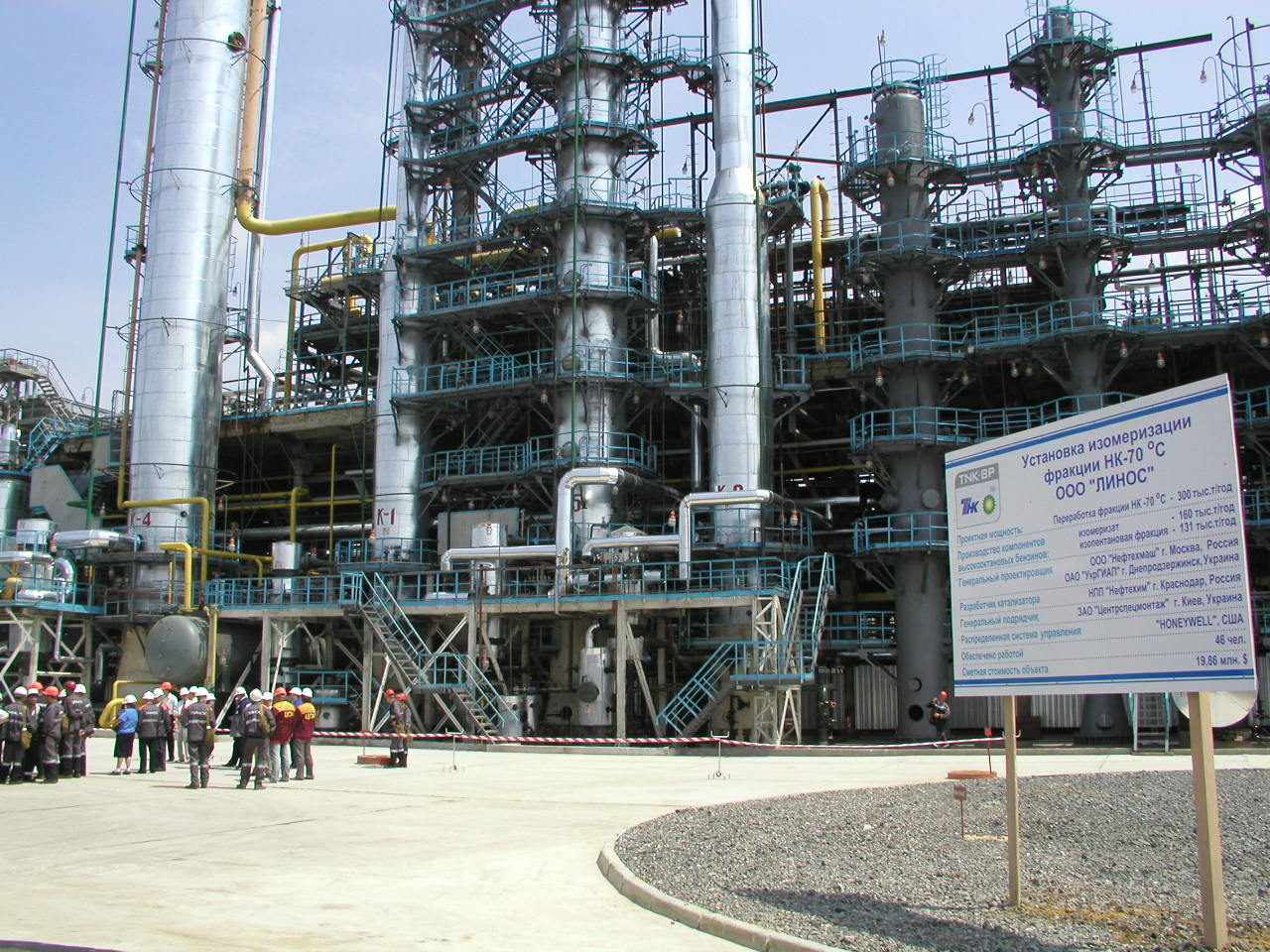
The Lysychansk Oil Refinery in 2010. During Dunaiev's time as mayor, the refinery, which was a major enterprise of the city, shut down in early 2012. This came amid Lysychansk's economic collapse, which had been ongoing since the 2000s.

In August 2009, Dunaiev was announced as a candidate for the post of Mayor of Lysychansk through the city's local branch of the Party of Regions. His candidacy came after the early elections had already been completed in May 2008, although those elections were declared invalid, forcing a repeat election slated for September 2009. Shortly after Dunaiev's candidacy was announced, the Lysychansk Territorial Election Commission of the TEC announced that eleven other candidates had registered for the repeat elections. The two main other candidates were Vyacheslav Terosipov, who was nominated from the opposition BYuT and, at the time, was Director of Lysychanskugol, a coal mining enterprise, and Valerii Bondarenko, who was nominated from another small opposition party, United Centre, and, at the time, was director of the Lysychansk thermal power plant. During the election season, Dunaiev filed an appeal to the Lysychansk TEC, in which he claimed that information about the voters was not accurately represented, which would lead to 2,500 voters' ballots being scratched. In response, in September 2009, a confidant of Terosipov filed a separate appeal to the Lysychansk TEC, which called for the cancelation of the seven candidates (including Dunaiev) who were running in the repeat elections but had not earlier participated in the early elections of May. In response, the TEC refused the confidant's appeal, letting the elections continue as is. The Donetsk Administrative Court of Appeal later upheld the Lysychansk TEC's ruling about the candidates, after the Lysychansk City Court had partially satisfied the claims of Terosipov on the claim that the TEC did not have the right to consider the application.

In the end, despite all the legal trouble, on 20 September 2009, Dunaiev was confirmed as mayor with a majority, 57.18%, of the vote. Terosipov and Andrey Skory rounded out the top three. His election was solidified when the Donetsk Administrative Court of Appeal dismissed all of Terosipov's claims against Dunaiev's election in October 2009. During his early years as mayor, Dunaiev mainly focused on the ongoing shutdowns and the collapse of Lysychansk's industry. Throughout 2010, multiple protest rallies and pickets took place at both the soda plant and the thermal power plant due to unpaid wages, leading Dunaiev to call an extraordinary session of the city council and confirm that the main coal company, Lysychanskugol, would still exist, although some mines would be closed. The main shutdown during his tenure was the Lysychansk Oil Refinery, which was the city's dominant enterprise, prior to its Russian owners, Rosneft, closing it down in 2012. This led to a high unemployment rate in Lysychansk, which locals accused Dunaiev of ignoring.

Despite this, during the 2010 Ukrainian local elections, he ran again for the post of mayor. Earlier candidates from 2009, like Bondarenko, Terosipov, and Skory, all registered for the election, but both Terosipov and Skory (Skory was now backed by the Socialist Party of Ukraine) unexpectedly withdrew together and urged voters to vote for Bondarenko, who was a member of the Communist Party of Ukraine. Despite these backings crossing party lines, Dunaiev easily won re-election at 66.3% of the vote, with Bondarenko getting 14.6%. The Party of Regions also dominated the city council at 61.9%, and they won every single-member district also. Dunaiev's second term as mayor was dominated by the debate over Ukrainian-language schools. In January 2011, it was announced that one of the last Ukrainian-language schools in Lysychansk, School No. 3, would possibly close. It was also specialised and helped kids with cerebral palsy and vision problems. In response to the appeal, the head of the local education department, Iryna Tsymbal, said that it would not close and that the city's council had only included it in an effort to optimise the school, due to overspending she said was caused by it not enrolling many children. This was followed by rumours of another Ukrainian-language school closing, School No. 12, which led parents to meet with Dunaiev. During this meeting, he affirmed that no schools would be closing and that he wanted both Ukrainian and Russian-language schools to function, but that the city needed to optimise the schools. In addition, he blamed the rumours on "pre-election mode". His term as mayor ended early, though, on 22 November 2012, because he was elected a People's Deputy of Ukraine and Ukraine forbids dual mandates.

=== Verkhovna Rada (2012-present) ===
==== 2012 elections (7th convocation) ====
In July 2012, a few months before the 2012 Ukrainian parliamentary elections, the Luhansk branch of the Party of Regions presented Dunaiev as a candidate for the Verkhovna Rada in constituency No. 107. At its formation for these elections (as the elections in 2007 had previously been proportional), 107 consisted of the city of Lysychansk, parts of the city of Pervomaisk, parts of the city of Kadiivka, and a little bit of the Popasna Raion. Its seat was in Lysychansk. Other candidates who registered early for the race include his longtime rival from Batkivshchyna, Terosipov, and two self-nominated candidates: Valentin Gladkikh (from Kyiv) and Vitalii Shvedov (a human rights activist in Lysychansk).

During the election campaign, Batkivshchyna accused Dunaiev of violating the law through bribery. This was because, as reported in the Popasna Bulletin, in September 2012 he held an event in the city of Popasna in which he opened up a new playground and gave various gifts and prizes from the Party of Regions, which Batkivshchyna found was attempting to persuade voters. Later, Terosipov also accused him of using administrative resources to help with his campaign, which he said came from information by OSCE observers. Nevertheless, the Party of Regions won a landslide victory in Luhansk Oblast during those elections, which included Dunaiev. Preliminary counting on the day of the election found that he had won with 38,920 votes, although another candidate, Sergii Shakhov, trailed closely behind with 35,062 votes. After all the votes were counted, it was confirmed that Dunaiev won with 41.93% of the votes against Shakhov's 38.5%. This was one of the closer elections of the season in Luhansk Oblast, sincce Shakhov only lost by 3.6%.

==== 2014 elections (8th convocation) ====
In 2014, Dunaiev decided to re-run in the snap 2014 Ukrainian parliamentary elections for the Opposition Bloc, although parts of his constituency were heavily effected by the War in the Donbas (other constituencies, such as 104-105 and 108-111 in Luhansk Oblast did not hold elections at all). Within the 107th constituency, voting was only held in firmly government-controlled districts, so this only included areas in Lysychansk, despite what the CEC reported. Pervomaisk and Kadiivka were both occupied by the Luhansk People's Republic, and the Popasna Raion remained fully on the front line. Thus, the turnout was at a record low of 23.73% (21,674 voters out of 91,447). These elections were heavily marred by accusations that Dunaiev had supported the separatists and Russia, and that Dunaiev had provided a safe haven to the separatists when they occupied Lysychansk. In protest, members of Batkivshchyna, Our Ukraine, For the Future, Party of Greens of Ukraine, UDAR, and the minor People's Labor Union of Ukraine blocked the district commission of the 107th district, leading to the Opposition Bloc appealing to the CEC. Despite this, Dunaiev won re-election, with 37.76% of voters voting for him.

==== 2019 elections (9th convocation) ====
Unlike in his past national elections, Dunaiev did not run in a constituency, instead running on the party list of the Opposition Platform - For Life. It was confirmed that he would be on the party list as early as June 2019, and it was later announced that he would be No. 9 on the list. Thus, he was successfully elected without any opposition. Due to the ongoing Russian invasion of Ukraine, these are the latest elections, and Dunaiev remains a deputy because Ukraine can not hold another election until the declaration of martial law is over (if it were not so, the next elections would have been in 2023).

On 20 March 2022, his party, the Opposition Platform, was suspended for the period of martial law due to having ties with Russia, and on 14 April, the faction in the Rada was dissolved. After it was dissolved, OPZZh leader, Yuriy Boyko, created a new parliamentary group called the Platform for Life and Peace (PFLM), which was allowed to exist after a number of pro-Russian politicians from OPZZh did not join. Dunaiev joined the PFLM, and was one of 25 deputies from the former OPZZh to do so.

== Political positions ==
=== Prior to the War in the Donbas ===
In October 2013, just weeks before Euromaidan began, OPORA found that Rybak was not present for the majority of the European integration bills, but that he had put forward two amendments to them. Despite this, still in November, he said that Ukraine should, for the most part, cooperate with Russia, citing the fact that industrialists had lost billions to align with the European Union and after Viktor Yanukovych decided to not sign the European Union–Ukraine Association Agreement he called the agreement with Russia "a huge victory" and that Ukraine did not need maidans. He first spoke up about the ongoing Euromaidan protests in January 2014, saying that Yanukovych had defended national interests by postponing the agreement, and he called for unity against what he said was extremism, fascism, and neo-Nazism. A month later, though, in March, during widespread Anti-Maidan rallies in Lysychansk, he told people to stop waving the Russian flag and to comply with the law. He also signed a statement in early April that called for the unity of Ukraine, although the statement also said that Ukraine needed to give more federalisation and local self-government, along with making the Russian language in Ukraine the second state language.

=== War in the Donbas ===
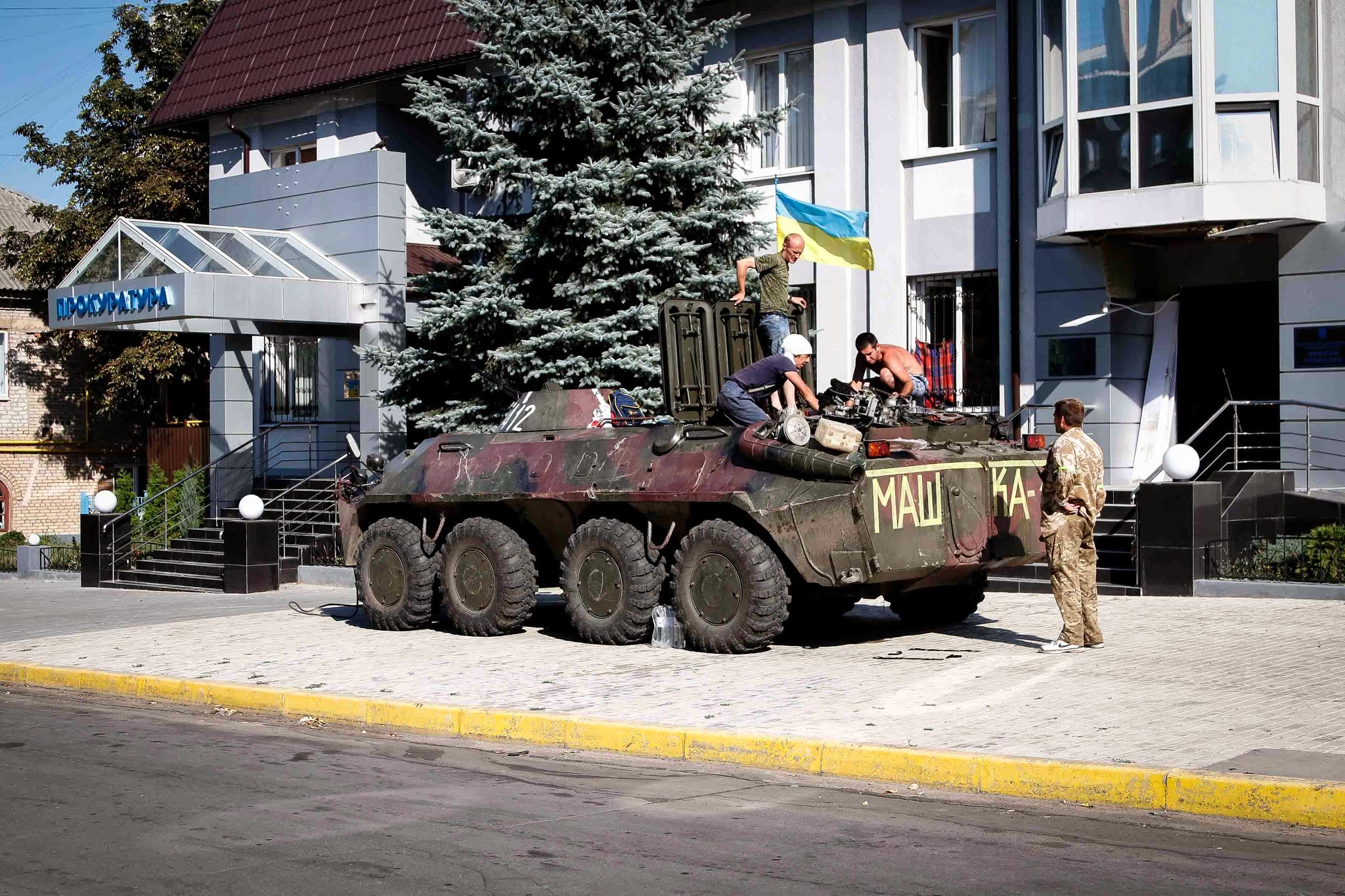
Ukrainian military entering Lysychansk in July 2014 during the War in the Donbas. In May 2015, Dunaiev, during a rally, controversially said that militants of the LPR were "heroes", and that the ATO had destroyed the Donbas.

Dunaiev speaking to the Verkhovna Rada in September 2015.

After the SBU building in Luhansk was taken by militants from the pro-Russian, separatist Luhansk People's Republic in April during the start of the War in the Donbas, Dunaiev stayed inside the building. Serhiy Tihipko said that Dunaiev had done this to make sure the resolution would not be by force, while Boyko said he was negotiating with the militants. However, later on in 2016, one of the leaders of the militants, Serhiy Korsunsky, alleged that Dunaiev had stayed inside voluntarily to ensure there would not be a storming by the Ukrainian forces. After most of Luhansk Oblast began to fall to the LPR, some sources allege that he helped organise the 2014 Donbas status referendums that were intended to legitimise the LPR and Donetsk People's Republic, although they do not provide evidence for these claims. This came after Lysychansk itself was captured by militants of the LPR in April 2014.

After Lysychansk was taken back during the Anti-Terrorist Operation (ATO) in July, Dunaiev addressed voters in Lysychansk in September together with Boyko. During this address, he said he would remain a member of the opposition and that the current government installed after Euromaidan was not listening to or giving representation to the opposition. Dunaiev also said the Opposition Bloc was the only group that could restore the Donbas's rights. A few months later, in March 2015, he co-authored a bill that would give amnesty to all participants in the events of the War in the Donbas. Then, during a Victory Day rally on 9 May 2015, he accused the ATO of setting Ukraine's economy back by decades and accused the ATO of destroying settlements and forcing residents to go and fight. In addition, Dunaiev was accused of calling militants in the Donbas "heroes", specifically fighters under Igor Plotnitsky, and said that the Ukrainian government had treated veterans "inhumanely".

A year later, in March 2016, he co-authored bill No. 4297, which proposed creating a territorial association for the Donbas. Although the association would be part of Ukraine, it would have far greater autonomy and would be able to hold its own elections, in a status similar to Crimea's pre-2014. He later proposed that Ukraine should restore its economic ties with the Donbas to end the war, and called for the government not to divide the Ukrainian people into "right" or "wrong", as he accused it of doing nothing to promote peace and territorial integrity. In 2018, Dunaiev was one of 36 deputies who voted against the law on recognising Ukrainian sovereignty over parts of Luhansk and Donetsk Oblast that were currently occupied.

== Personal life ==
He is married to Elena Dunaeva, and together they have one son and a daughter. Their son's name is Artem. His son is one of the co-founders of "OLVI", which Serhiy formally headed from 2002 to 2007. As of 2016, Serhiy has lived permanently in Sievierodonetsk, not Lysychansk. He owns four apartments, according to his declarations. In 2022, it was noted that his address, according to court documents, was still registered in the temporarily occupied cities of Sievierodonetsk and Lysychansk.

=== Legal issues ===
In May 2018, it was first announced that the Prosecutor General's Office of Ukraine wanted to lift his immunity (which he had by being in the Rada) due to false declarations in his income statement for 2015. The Prosecutor's Office alleged he had ten undeclared companies. In response, Dunaiev said that the accusations were a smear campaign by "radical activists". The requests for the lifting of immunity were sent to the Rada, but the decision failed, with 125 out of the 226 required votes in favour. A year later, in August 2019, it was confirmed that the statute of limitations on the case would expire soon, and that it was likely nothing would come of the case due to the need for the lifting of immunity. In 2022, the Pecherskyi District in Kyiv also closed another case that covered conflict of interest.
