= Mykola Babenko =

Ukrainian politician

- Микола Бабенко
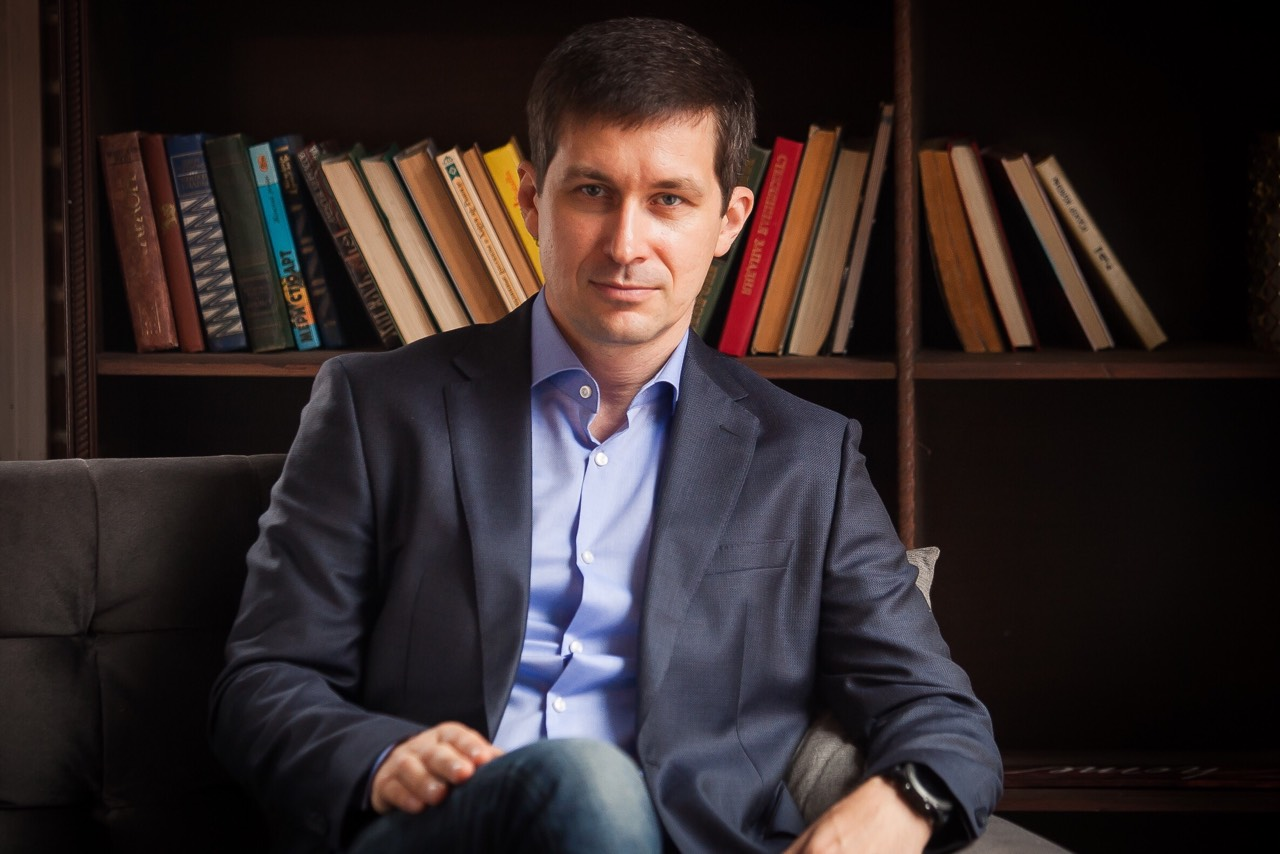

Chairman of the Kyiv Oblast Council
- In office 27 February 2014 – 10 November 2015
- Preceded by: Oleksandr Kachnyi
- Succeeded by: Hanna Starikova

People's Deputy of Ukraine

9th convocation
- Incumbent
- Assumed office 29 August 2019
- Preceded by: Oleksandr Marchenko
- Constituency: Kyiv Oblast, No. 90

Personal details
- Born: 17 September 1980 (age 45) Kryvyi Rih, Ukrainian SSR, Soviet Union
- Party: Dovira
- Other political affiliations: Bila Tserkva Together; Ukrainian Democratic Alliance for Reform; Petro Poroshenko Bloc
- Education: Taras Shevchenko National University of Kyiv

Mykola Viktorovych Babenko (Ukrainian: Микола Вікторович Бабенко; born 17 September 1980) is a Ukrainian politician currently serving as a People's Deputy of Ukraine representing Ukraine's 90th electoral district from Dovira since 2019. He was elected as a member of Bila Tserkva Together.

== Early life and career ==
Mykola Viktorovych Babenko was born on 17 September 1980 in the southern Ukrainian city of Kryvyi Rih. He is an orphan. In 2002, he graduated from the international relations institute of Taras Shevchenko National University of Kyiv, specialising in private international law. In 2005, he completed his postgraduate studies at Shevchenko University's faculty of law.

In 2001, Babenko began working as a legal assistant. In 2003, he began practicing law on his own. He also worked in the road construction industry. In 2015, he founded BioPromEnerho TOV, which he served as director of prior to becoming a People's Deputy. He was also head of BC Invest, an investment attraction group.

== Political career ==
Babenko became a deputy from the Ukrainian Democratic Alliance for Reform in the Kyiv Oblast Council in the 2010 Ukrainian local elections. He mounted his first campaign to become a People's Deputy of Ukraine in the 2012 Ukrainian parliamentary election, running in Ukraine's 211th electoral district. He lost the election, placing third behind Party of Regions candidate Ihor Lysov and the winner, Serhiy Teryokhin of Batkivshchyna. He gathered 26.20% of the vote, 4.2% behind Teryokhin's 30.40% and only 320 votes behind Lysov.

During the 2014 Ukrainian parliamentary election Babenko launched another campaign, this time in Ukraine's 90th electoral district as the candidate of the Petro Poroshenko Bloc. He was defeated by Oleksandr Marchenko of Svoboda, with 20.60% of the vote to Marchenko's 23.66%.

In the 2019 Ukrainian parliamentary election, Babenko ran once again to become a People's Deputy in the 90th electoral district, this time as the candidate of Bila Tserkva Together. This time, Babenko was successfully elected, winning against Servant of the People candidate Yuriy Nesterchuk with 28.23% to Nesterchuk's 16.00%.

In the Verkhovna Rada (Ukraine's parliament), Babenko joined the Dovira parliamentary group. He is secretary of the Verkhovna Rada Committee on Social Policies and Protection of Veterans' Rights. He is also a member of the "A Country Accessible to Everyone" inter-factional association.
