= Spade (political party) =

All-Ukrainian Agrarian Association "Spade" Всеукраїнський аграрний об'єднання "заступ"
- Leader: Vira Ulianchenko
- Founded: 4 May 2011
- Ideology: Agrarianism; Decentralization; Economic nationalism
- Political position: Left-wing
- Verkhovna Rada: 0 / 450

All-Ukrainian Agrarian Association "Spade" (Ukrainian: Заступ, Zastup) is a Ukrainian political party registered on 4 May 2011.

Its name is an obsolete form that means "spade". Zastup is also a portmanteau standing for Za Sotsialnu Trudovu Ukrainsku Perspektyvu, meaning For Social Laborious Ukrainian Perspective.

The party's former name was "People's Initiative" (Ukrainian: Народна ініціатива). The party is led by Vira Ulianchenko, who is a former head of Ukraine's Presidential Administration.

It participated in the 2014 election to the Verkhovna Rada. The party won one seat when its unaffiliated candidate Valeriy Davydenko won in the 208th single-member constituency located in Bakhmach. He won with 38.86% of the vote. Davydenko later joined the parliamentary faction of Petro Poroshenko Bloc. Davydenko was re-elected, after again a win in the 208th constituency (with 37,43% of the vote) but this time as an independent candidate, in the 2019 Ukrainian parliamentary election.

== Ideology ==
The party focuses on agrarian issues as well as decentralization, believing that in Ukraine, self-governing communities should be given extensive autonomy, especially the cultural and fiscal one; similarly, the party proposes delegating central power as close as possible to a citizen level, and moving some governmental institutions out of Kyiv. The party is considered left-wing.

Zastup argues that Ukrainian should be the sole Ukrainian language of Ukraine, while also stressing the need to invest in agrarian education, particularly in agricultural science and modern farming methods.

On the issue of the European Union, the party believes that "Europe is the Ukrainian choice, but entering the united Europe should take place on advantageous conditions".

On agriculture, the party advocates for an extensive spending program that would provide an incentive for living in rural areas, such as improving the quality of rurak municipal services and allocating up to 25% of local budgets to the development on the countryside. According to the party, organic manufacturing should be given extensive state support, along with high added value to agricultural commodities. The party also proposes a "Soil Fertility Protection" plan that would help maintain good soil quality, as well as an act that will break down agricultural monopolies and limit large landowners.

== Election results ==
=== Verkhovna Rada ===
Election year	# of constituency votes	% of constituency votes	# of party list votes	% of party list votes	# of overall seats won	+/–
2014	134,418	0.89	417,396	2.65	1 / 450	▲1
2019	Did not run				0 / 450	▼1
