= Poltava Oblast Council =

Legislature of Poltava Oblast, Ukraine

Type
- Type: Unicameral
- Houses: 1

Leadership
- Speaker: Oleksandr Bilenky

Structure
- Seats: 84
- Political groups: Government (51); Trust (16); Servant of the People (14); Fatherland (12); European Solidarity (9); Opposition (34); For the Future (13); Opposition Platform — For Life (11); Native City (9)

Elections
- Last election: 25 October 2020

Meeting place
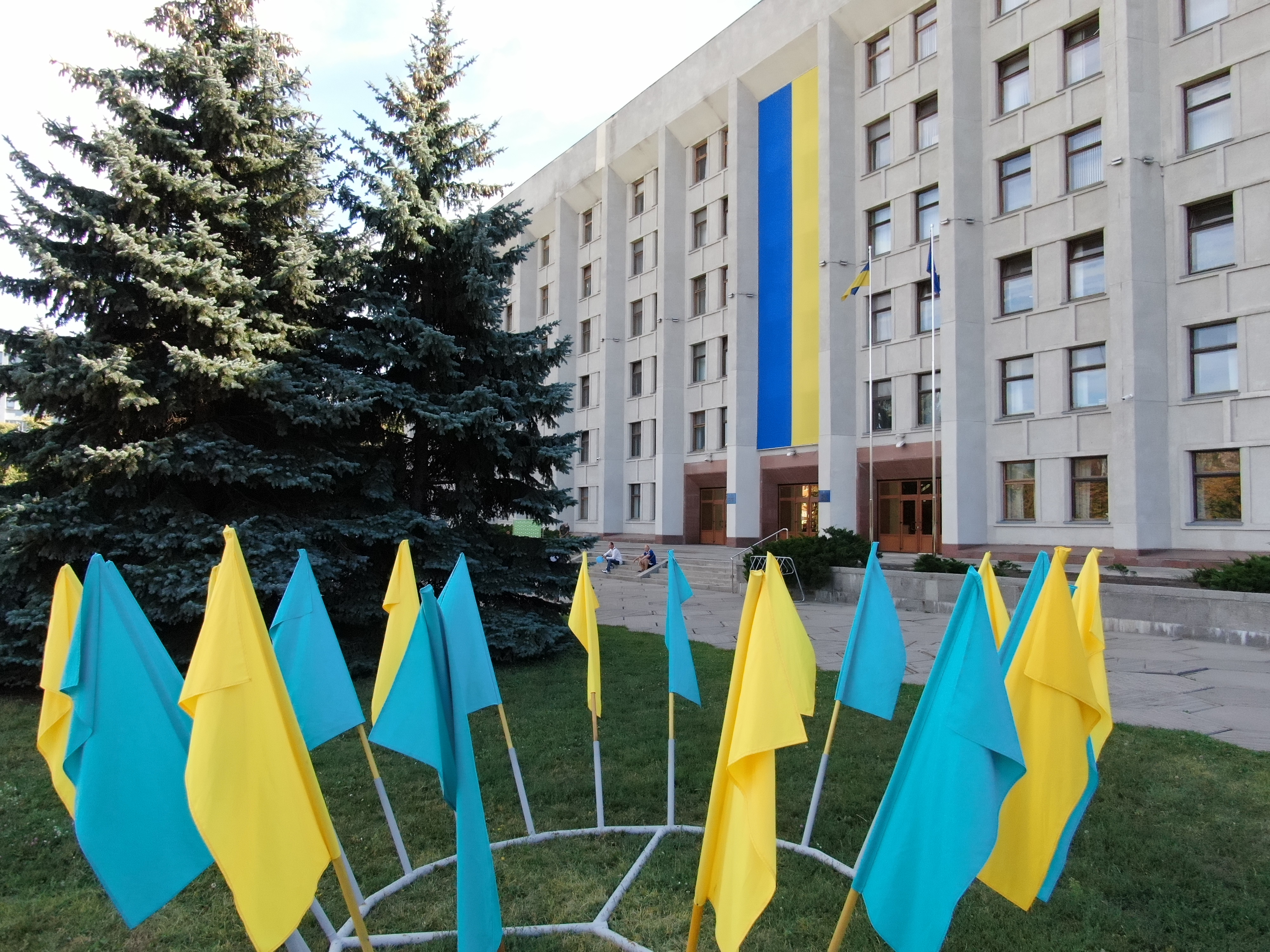
- Poltava, Poltava Oblast, Ukraine

Website
- http://www.oblrada.pl.ua/

The Poltava Oblast Council (Ukrainian: Полтавська обласна рада) is the regional oblast council (parliament) of the Poltava Oblast (province) located in central Ukraine.

Council members are elected for five year terms. In order to gain representation in the council, a party must gain more than 5 percent of the total vote.

== Recent elections ==
=== 2020 ===
Distribution of seats after the 2020 Ukrainian local elections

Political party	Seats
Trust	16
Servant of the People	14
For the Future	13
Batkvishchyna	12
Opposition Platform — For Life	11
Native City	9
European Solidarity	9

Election date was 25 October 2020

=== 2015 ===
Distribution of seats after the 2015 Ukrainian local elections:

Political party	Seats
Solidarity	15
Fatherland	13
Radical Party	8
UKROP	8
Social-Democratic Party	8
Svoboda	7
Agrarian Party	7
Native City	6
Opposition Bloc	6
Revival	6

Election date was 25 October 2015

== Chairmen ==
=== Regional executive committee ===
- Panteleymon Zhuchenko (1937–1938)
- Ivan Martynenko (1938–1941, 1943–1950)
- Alexei Koval (1950–1953)
- Nikolai Rozhanchuk (1953–1955)
- Andrei Cherchenko (1955–1959)
- Alexander Muzhitsky (1959–1962)
- Nikolai Kirichenko (1962–1963)
- Maxim Onipko (1963–1964, industrial)
- Stepan Boyko (1963–1964, agrarian)
- Stepan Boyko (1964–1974)
- Grigory Pudenko (1974–1978)
- Grigory Ustimenko (1978–1984)
- Alexei Myakota (1984–1988)
- Ivan Gopey (1988–1992)

=== Regional council ===
- Alexei Myakota (1990–1991)
- Ivan Gopey (1991–1994)
- Mykola Zaludyak (1994–1998)
- Oleksandr Poliievets (1998–2002)
- Yevhen Tomin (2002)
- Volodymyr Hryshko (2002–2006)
- Volodymyr Marchenko (acting, 2006)
- Oleksandr Udovichenko (2006–2010)
- Volodymyr Marchenko (2010)
- Ivan Momot (2010–2014)
- Petro Vorona (2014–2015)
- Oleksandr Bilenkyi (since 2015)
