= Oleksandr Feldman =

Ukrainian politician and businessman

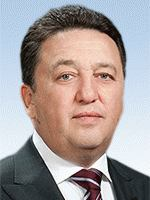
Official Verkhovna Rada portrait, 2012

Olexandr Borysovych Feldman (Ukrainian: Олександр Борисович Фельдман; born January 6, 1960) is a Ukrainian politician and public figure, People's Deputy of Ukraine (since 2002), businessman, multi-millionaire. He is considered to be one of the most influential people in Kharkiv. In 2013 he entered the rating of the hundred richest Ukrainians of the Ukrainian magazine Forbes, finishing 35th ($ 287m). Since June 2015, the co-chairman of the political party Our Land.

== Biography ==
He is married and has two sons and a grandson. He graduated from the Kharkiv National University in 2002, as an economist.

He is a member of the Ukrainian Parliament and president of the Ukrainian Jewish Committee. Feldman is also a co-founder of the Institute of Human Rights and the Prevention of Extremism and Xenophobia.

Feldman first entered the Ukrainian parliament after winning a single-member district located in Kharkiv during the 2002 Ukrainian parliamentary election. In parliament he joined the United Ukraine faction and when that party merged with Batkivshchyna Feldman joined this party too.

Batkivshchyna was a part of the Yulia Tymoshenko Bloc during the 2006 Ukrainian parliamentary election and 2007 Ukrainian parliamentary election Feldman was re-elected into parliament on a party ticket of this bloc of political parties. He also was of its Kharkiv regional party organization. In March 2011 Feldman left the Yulia Tymoshenko Bloc faction in parliament and joined the Party of Regions. He did so citing too much influence of nationalism in the Yulia Tymoshenko Bloc.

In the 2012 Ukrainian parliamentary election Feldman won a parliamentary seat in a single-member district located in Kharkiv for Party of Regions.

In the 2014 Ukrainian parliamentary election Feldman as an independent candidate won the same single-member district as in 2012 with 64.94% of the votes.

Feldman joined the party Our Land in August 2015.

In 2017, he was elected to the board of the international organization "Religions for Peace", a pacifist organization with headquarters in New York, which has consultative status with UNESCO, UNICEF and the Economic and Social Council of the United Nations.

In the July 2019 Ukrainian parliamentary election Feldman was re-elected to parliament after again winning electoral district 174 in Kharkiv, again as an independent candidate. This time with 37.24% of the votes (slightly 4% more than runner-up Viktoria Alekseychuk of the Servant of the People party). In parliament he joined the Opposition Platform — For Life faction. For this party Feldman was candidate in the October 2020 Kharkiv mayoral election. He finished second with 14.32%, losing to incumbent mayor Hennadiy Kernes.

On 15 March 2022, following the Russian invasion of Ukraine, Feldman left the Opposition Platform — For Life faction stating that the party's actions leading up to and during the war contradicted their previous stance of stressing the need to negotiate agreements to end wars.
