= Committee of Voters of Ukraine =

Ukrainian non-government organization

- Комітет виборців України
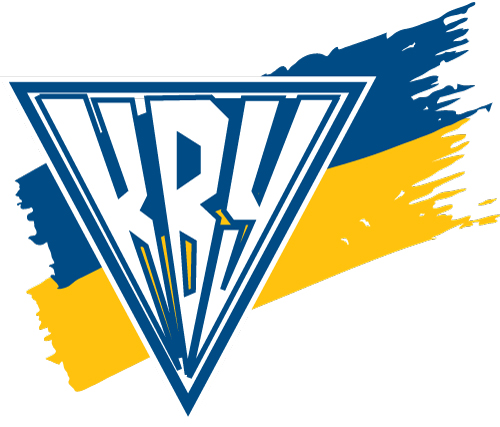
- Formation: February 20, 1994
- Type: Non-governmental organization
- Location: Ukraine
- Chairman: Oleksiy Koshel
- Website: www.cvu.org.ua/eng

The Committee of Voters of Ukraine (CVU) (Ukrainian: Комітет виборців України (КВУ), romanized: Komitet vybortsiv Ukrainy (KVU)) is an all-Ukrainian non-government organization whose main task is to observe the election campaigns, maintain relations between voters and the authorities, and protect the voting rights of citizens. Branches of the organization operate in 24 regions and in more than 200 districts of Ukraine. The NGO was established on February 20, 1994. The organization declares itself as neutral to political parties and candidates, acts on the basis of voluntariness, equality of its members, self-government, legality and transparency.

During the period of its activity, based on the methodology developed by the organization, which took into account all key standards of election observation, the CVU monitored all national election campaigns, without exception, as well as most local election campaigns.

CVU stated that the Ukrainian local elections 2020 which took part on 25 October were democratic.

== History and activities ==
According to the National Democratic Institute (NDI), the CVU was formed in 1994 from student, human rights and trade union activists and fielded about 4,000 monitors during that year's elections. For the 1998 parliamentary elections it recruited about 15,000 volunteer pollwatchers and ran a voter-education campaign. From 1998, the CVU says taht it broadened its work to include monitoring political parties and elections in other countries taking part in electoral-law reform and training election commission members and observers.

The Charles Stewart Mott Foundation gave the CVU grants of US$200,000 for 2007–2009 and US$140,000 for 2010–2011. The foundation reported that in 2007–2009 the committee trained more than 200,000 local election commissioners and party observers and maintained a pool of about 3,000 volunteer monitors.
