= Serhii Shakhov =

Ukrainian politician

- Сергій Шахов
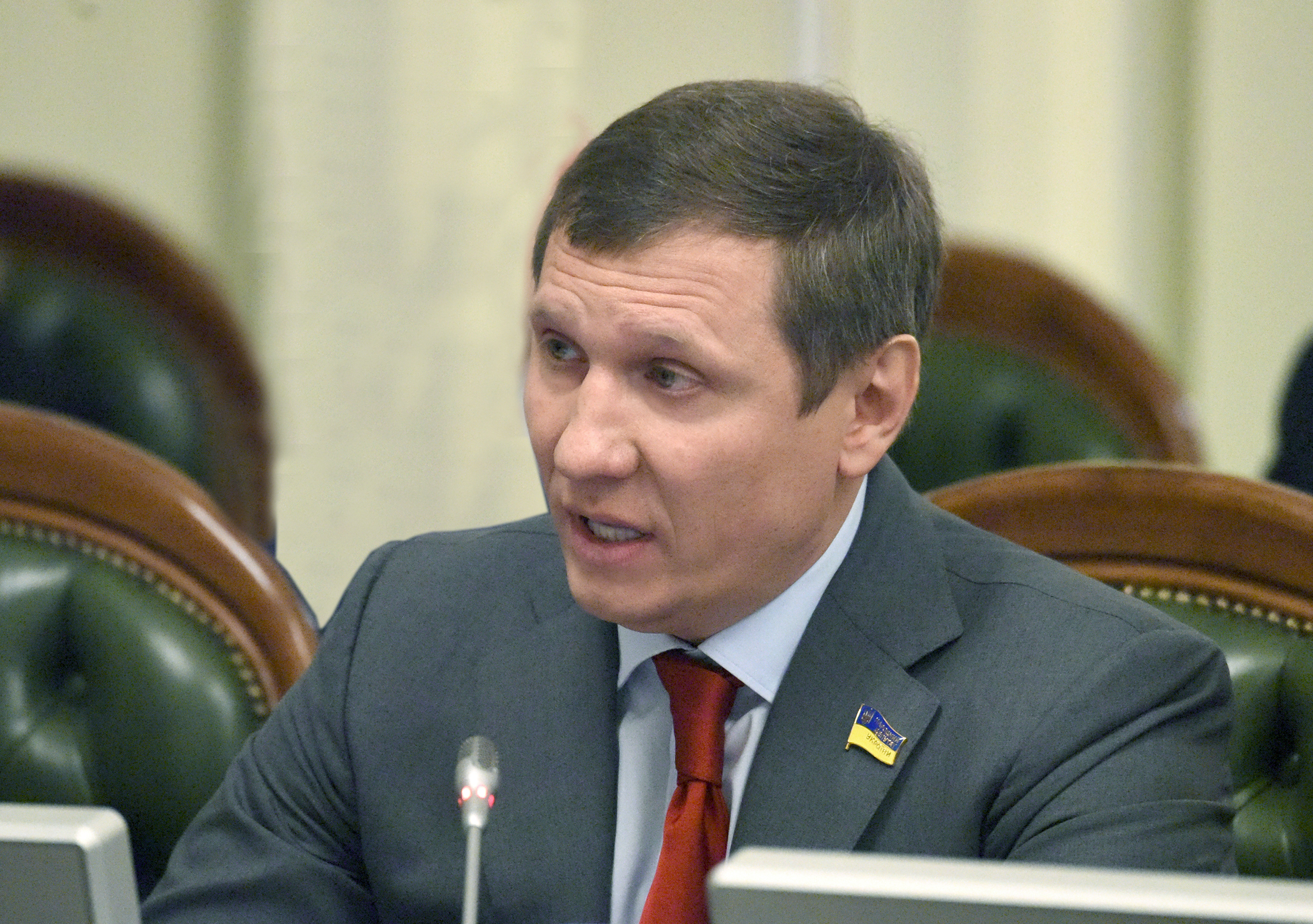

People's Deputy of Ukraine
- Incumbent
- Assumed office 6 September 2016

Personal details
- Born: 7 May 1975 (age 51) Sayak, Kazakh SSR, Soviet Union (now Kazakhstan)
- Party: Our Land
- Education: Yaroslav Mudryi National Law University

Serhii Volodymyrovych Shakhov (Ukrainian: Сергій Володимирович Шахов; born 7 May 1975) is a Ukrainian politician. He is a People's Deputy of Ukraine of since 2016. He has been on the run from Ukrainian authorities since 2023 over corruption charges. He attends parliamentary committee sessions virtually from his property in Dubai.

== Biography ==
The family dates back to Luhansk Oblast. In 1976 the family moved to a stable place of living to Kadiivka. Higher Education: Law. In 2011 got a diploma of the Master of in Law Academy, Ukraine, after Yaroslav the Wise. He is a founder of Kadiivka city Public Organization «Dobrodiy» which gives charity help to boarding schools, secondary schools and gymnasiums, pre-school organizations, hospitals, sports societies. In 2011 was awarded for high professionalism by All-Ukraine Charity Organization «Ukrainian Cultural Fund».

== Political Activity ==
In March 2006 was elected a deputy of Luhansk Oblast Council of the Vth convocation (fixed region Kadiivka). Since December 8, 2010 he is a member of executive committee of Kadiivka city Council. In 2012 he headed his team at the elections to the Verkhovna Rada of Ukraine. Nonparty man. In 2012 because of the speech against the Party of Regions the authorities brought criminal cases to the court and he is being searched.

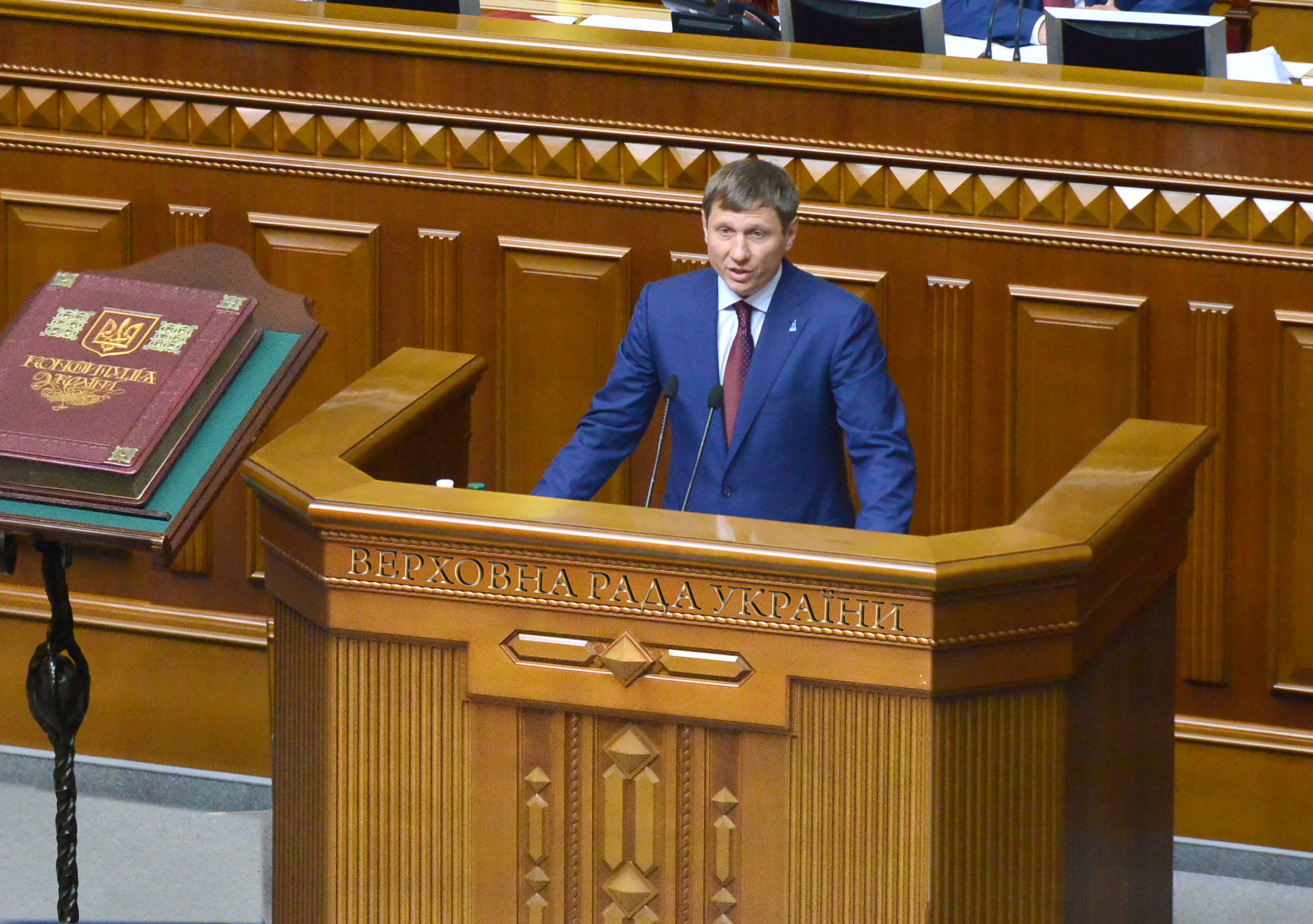
Serhii Shakhov, 2016

Leader and a founder of public organization People’s Belief. He initiated to around tables on the topic "How to unite the country". 15 round tables have already been arranged successfully in the cities of Ukraine. He helps Ukrainian military men and frontiersmen with ammunition: body armor, steel pots, night vision devices, cars. He gives financial aid to the free-will battalion of Ukrainian National Army. He participates in organization of Donetsk and Luhansk citizens’ temporary relocation to Western regions of the country and to Odesa. Volunteers of People’s Belief organized the settling of more than 200 families. S. Shakhov managed to save a pilot's life who participated in military actions in War in Donbass zone. On August 17 battle-plain was attacked by the terrorists’ rocket in Samsonivka Region. Moreover, Sergey Shakhov actively worries about the wounded soldiers. He actively takes care of the wounded soldiers who are in hospital and are being cared for in Kyiv Central Military Hospital.

Shakhov became in 2016 a people's deputy of Ukraine after winning a 2014 Ukrainian parliamentary election by-election of constituency No. 114 located in Luhansk Oblast. The date when he got his deputy's power is September, 2016. Post: the member of the Committee of the Verkhovna Rada of Ukraine procedure and the work of the Verkhovna Rada organization. February 17, 2016 – the deputy of the Verkhovna Rada Shakhov became the member of deputy group «People's Will».

In the 2019 Ukrainian parliamentary election (as an independent candidate, although he was a member of the party Our Land at the time) again won constituency No. 114, this time with 43.17%, which was 20,605 votes (the voter turnout in the constituency was 46.26%).

Shakhov was a candidate for Mayor of Kyiv for the party Our Land in the 2020 Kyiv local election. He finished in 15th place with 1.608 votes.

Late January 2024 Ukrainian political watchdog Chesno reported that Shakhov was last physically present (and his card voted) in the Ukrainian Parliament building in November 2022. Since then Shakhov joins parliamentary online meetings with his camera turned off and mostly votes "for" consideration of the agenda. In October 2023 the National Anti-Corruption Bureau of Ukraine declared Shakhov wanted in a case related to the declaration of false information for systematic non-appearance at parliamentary preparatory meeting for seven months. Shakhov has been deprived of his (parliamentary) wages for "absenteeism during martial law."

== Personal life ==
He lives with his partner Inna Zhurba and their two children in Dubai. The yearly lease for their Dubai apartment is about $100,000.
