= Our Land (Ukraine) =

Our Land Наш край
- Leaders: Oleksandr Mazurchak; Anton Kisse; Serhii Shakhov
- Founded: 23 August 2011 (Bloc Party) 20 December 2014 (Our Land)
- Dissolved: 27 August 2025
- Preceded by: Party of Regions (partial; from 2014)
- Headquarters: Kyiv
- Ideology: Welfarism; Regionalism; Decentralization; Russophilia
- Political position: Centre
- Colours: Blue White
- Verkhovna Rada (2019): 0 / 450 (0%)
- Regions (2020): 1,892 / 43,122 (4%)

Party flag
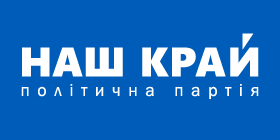

Website
- nashkray.org

Our Land (Ukrainian: Наш край, romanized: Nash krai) was a regionalist political party in Ukraine, founded in August 2011, that was dissolved in August 2025.

In 2014, originally named "Bloc Party", the party was renamed to "Our Land". In the October 2015 Ukrainian local elections the party took third place with 4,478 seats and 157 seats as mayors, heads of towns and villages. In the 2020 Ukrainian local elections the party gained 1,892 seats.

At a party congress held on 27 August 2025 the party decided to disband itself, due to its reputation being "critically damaged" by the court case falsely accusing it of collaborating with Russian Federation.

== History ==
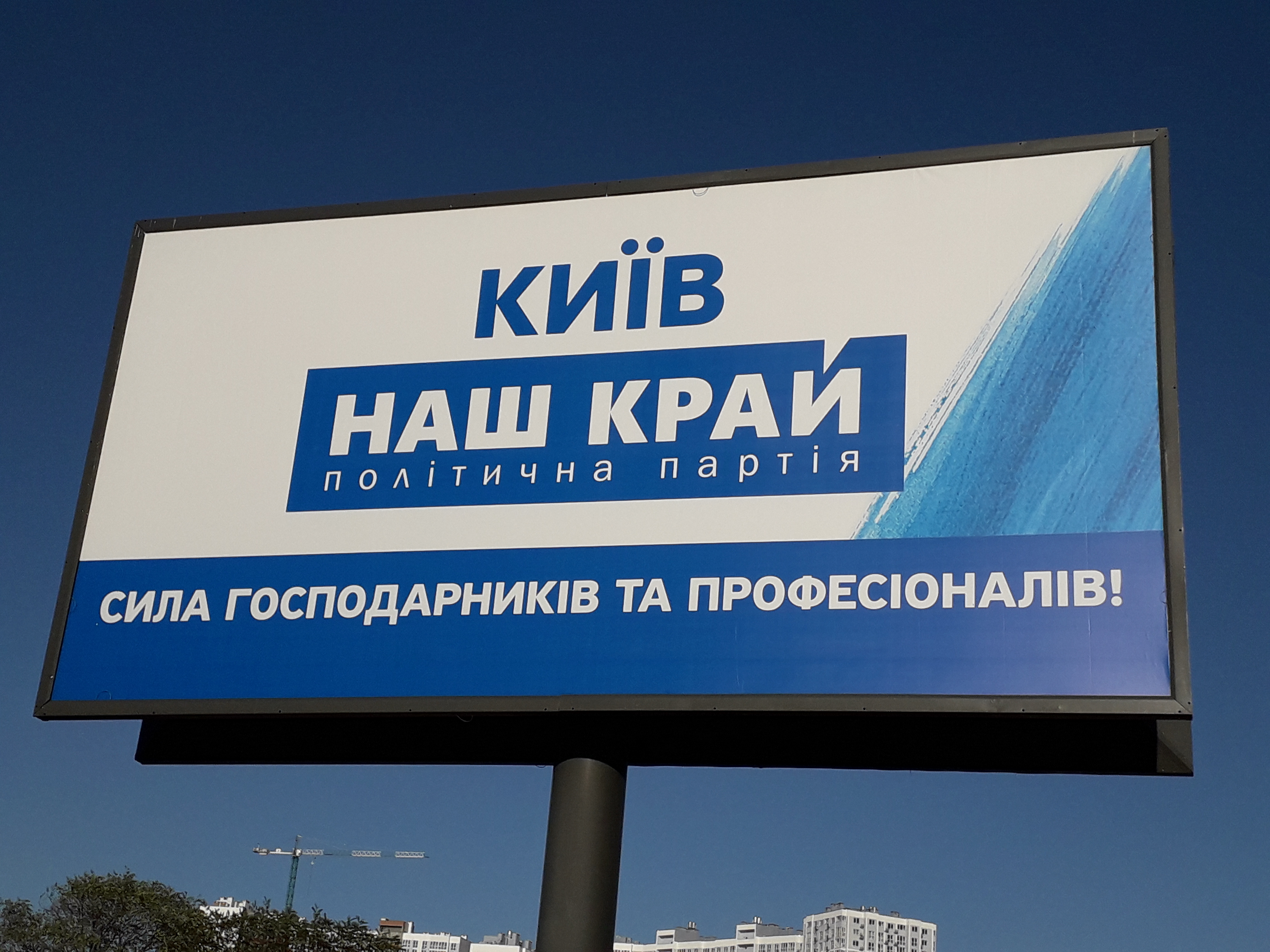
Our Land billboard in Kyiv during the 2020 local elections

The party was established/registered on 23 August 2011 as "Block Party".

The party did not participate in the 2012 Ukrainian parliamentary elections; or the 2014 Ukrainian parliamentary elections.

On 20 December 2014, the party changed its name to "Our Land".

By the summer of 2015 the majority of representatives of the party changed dramatically, encompassing individuals who still in 2014 were members of the Party of Regions. "Our Land" claimed in September 2015 that 62 mayors had joined the party, including the mayors of Mykolaiv, Chernihiv and Mariupol. Another known member of the party is member of the Ukrainian parliament (for Kharkiv) Oleksandr Feldman, who joined the party in August 2015.

In the 2019 Ukrainian parliamentary election, the party took part in only one single-mandate constituency. Its candidate Dmytro Khomiak received 0.10% of the vote in constituency 95 located in Irpin and was thus not elected to parliament.

In the 2020 Ukrainian local elections 1,694 Our Land candidates won seats on the local and regional level, about 5.13% of the total number of contested seats.

During the 2022 Russian invasion of Ukraine, many members of the Our Land party, including local politicians, cooperated with the Russian Armed Forces in Russian-occupied territories of Ukraine.

In June 2022, the leaders of the Our Land party were detained by the SBU (Security Service of Ukraine) for attempting to sell places on the electoral list.

On 19 June 2024, the party was banned in Ukraine by the final decision of the Eighth Administrative Court of Appeal. The property, funds and other assets of the party and its cells and other structural entities were transferred to state ownership. However, on 1 July 2025, the Supreme Court of Ukraine overturned the ban on the Our Land party in its final decision.

At the 40th congress (of the party) on 27 August 2025 the party decided to disband itself. Although the party stated that "in 10 years of the party's active activity, not a single statement in favor of the Russian Federation was found" it assessed that its "a few traitors or collaborators" did had "cast a shadow of distrust on the entire organization to which they belonged" and therefore the whole party had sustained "critical reputational damage."

== Management ==
The party was headed by three party leaders, all of whom were members of the Party of Regions until 2014: Oleksandr Mazurchak, Anton Kisse, and Serhii Shakhov.

== Ideology and political positions ==
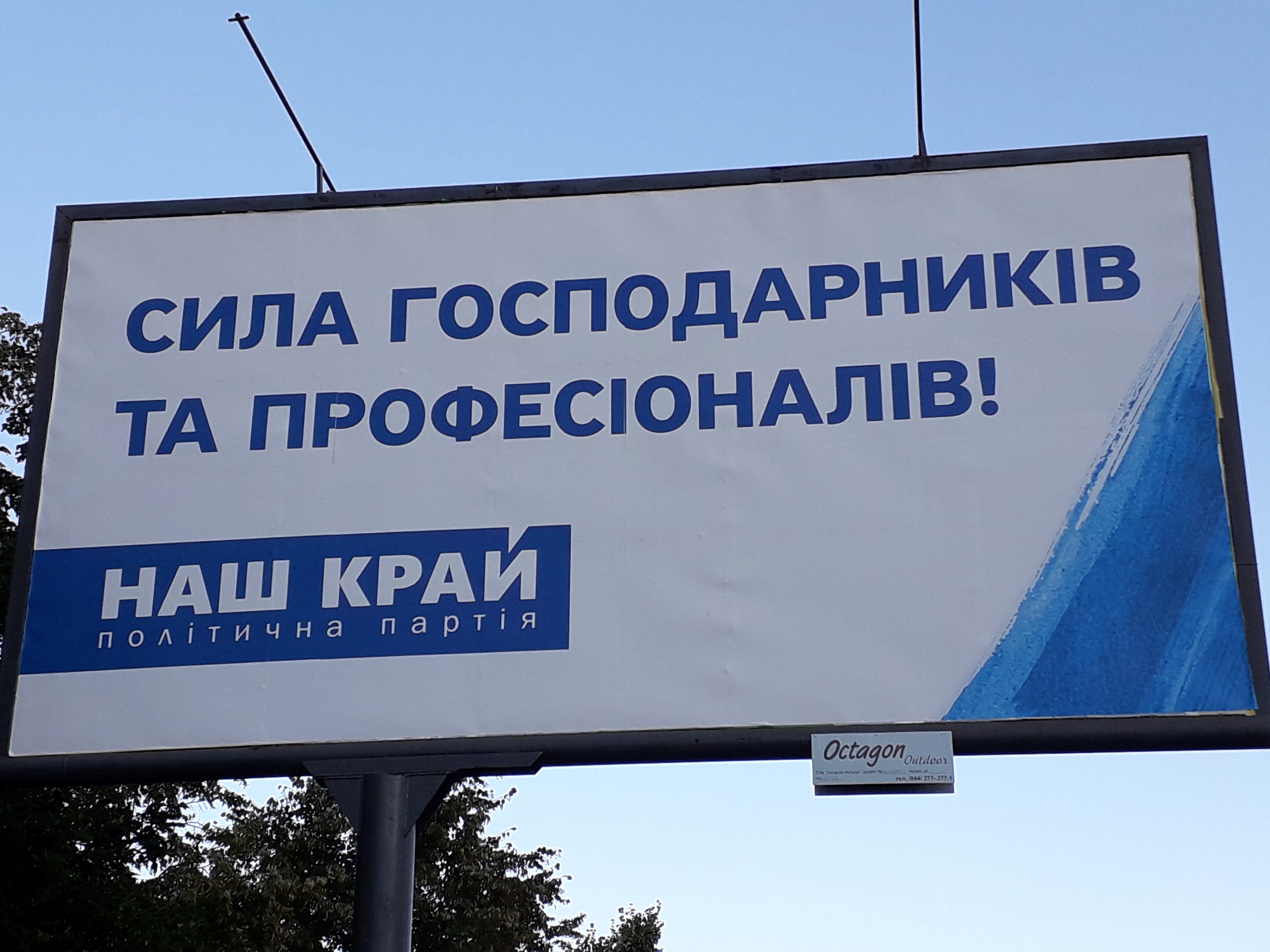
Agitation billboard of the party Our Land during 2020 Ukrainian local elections.

The party claims its main interest is "defense of the interests of local communities" and claims this is necessary because "the central government takes into account the interests of the community last". The public image of the party has three components: a team of experienced professionals, primarily local managers; disinterest in political games and ideological disputes; party core - regional centers focused on the development of their "small homelands".

According to the Ukrainian NGO Chesno the party had been supported by the administration of President Petro Poroshenko to prevent another pro-Russian party Opposition Bloc from gaining control over local councils in east Ukraine and south Ukraine in the 2015 Ukrainian local elections. Party's representatives themselves denied such a connection.

Maria Karmazina, a political scientist of the National Academy of Sciences of Ukraine, IPIEND, believes that the existence of the "Our Land" party, which has become an ideological follower of the pro-Russian Party of Regions, is a serious challenge for Ukrainian statehood, since members of this party are prone to anti-Ukrainian or anti-state actions. Political analyst Denys Kazanskyi calls the party "Our Land", together with the Opposition Bloc, a conditionally anti-Maidan party, and political scientist Viktor Bobirenko identifies the party's orientation as pro-Russian, pointing out that their voters do not like Russia as an aggressor, nor the West and NATO. According to political scientist Vadym Karasyov, in fact, the "Our Land" party is not pro-Russian; instead, according to Karasyov, in 2020 the party became the object of undeserved criticism and accusations of pro-Russianness by political competitors in order to reduce its rating. Despite its roots from the pro-Russian Party of Regions, Our Land has supported Ukrainian military action against the 2022 Russian invasion of Ukraine.

== Election results ==
=== Local councils ===
The number of deputies from "Our Land" in the oblast councils, 2015

Election	Performance				Rank
Election	%	± pp	Seats	+/–	Rank
2015	2.87%	New	4,478 / 158,399	New	4th
2020	4.46%	▲1.59	1,892 / 43,122	▼2586	7th

=== Verkhovna Rada ===
Year	Popular vote	% of popular vote	Overall seats won	Seat change	Government
2019	-	-	0 / 450	New	Extra-parliamentary

The party was one of the winners of the October 2015 Ukrainian local elections and took 4,640 seats. According to the Committee of Voters of Ukraine, Our Land became the most productive party in terms of the ratio of elected deputies to the number of registered candidates, gaining 32.3%. In July 2016, Serhiy Shakhov won the by-elections to the Verkhovna Rada in constituency No. 114 (Luhansk Oblast) with 37.62% result.

According to the results of the local elections of 2015–2019, the party entered the top five by the number of elected deputies.

In the first elections in the newly created united territorial communities, which took place in December 2016, 245 candidates became deputies from "Our Land".

On December 11, 89 representatives of the party from 15 OTGs became deputies. Leonid Dusha became the mayor of Baturyn in the Chernihiv Oblast, and Anatoliy Malakhatka became the chairman of the Malotokmach's village council in the Zaporizhzhia Oblast.

The party received 30% of the votes in the Mykolaiv and Chernihiv Oblasts (32%), and almost 20% in local elections in the Donetsk Oblast.

In the OTG elections on June 30, 2019, the party took second place with 17.2% of seats. 127 party representatives in 25 territorial communities became deputies.

In local elections up to 86 OTGs (69 rural, 16 settlement, 1 city), which took place on December 22, 2019, in 21 oblasts of Ukraine, as well as in additional local elections - in 33 OTGs (20 rural, 13 settlement) in 17 oblasts of Ukraine "Our Land" won 61 seats, which is 6.7% of all deputies elected from the parties, and took third place among the parties in the elections.

In the 2019 Ukrainian parliamentary election, four representatives of the party became People's Deputies of the Verkhovna Rada of Ukraine of the 9th convocation: Anton Kisse, Valeriy Davydenko, Serhii Shakhov and Andrii Derkach. Davydenko was found shot dead in the bathroom of his office on 23 May 2020. On 13 January 2023 Ukraine's parliament voted to strip Derkach of his position as a people's deputy.

== See also ==
- Party of Regions
- Opposition Bloc
