= 2020 Ukrainian local elections =

Ukrainian municipal elections

- 25 October 2020; 15, 22 & 29 November 2020 and 6 December 2020 (second round of mayoral elections)
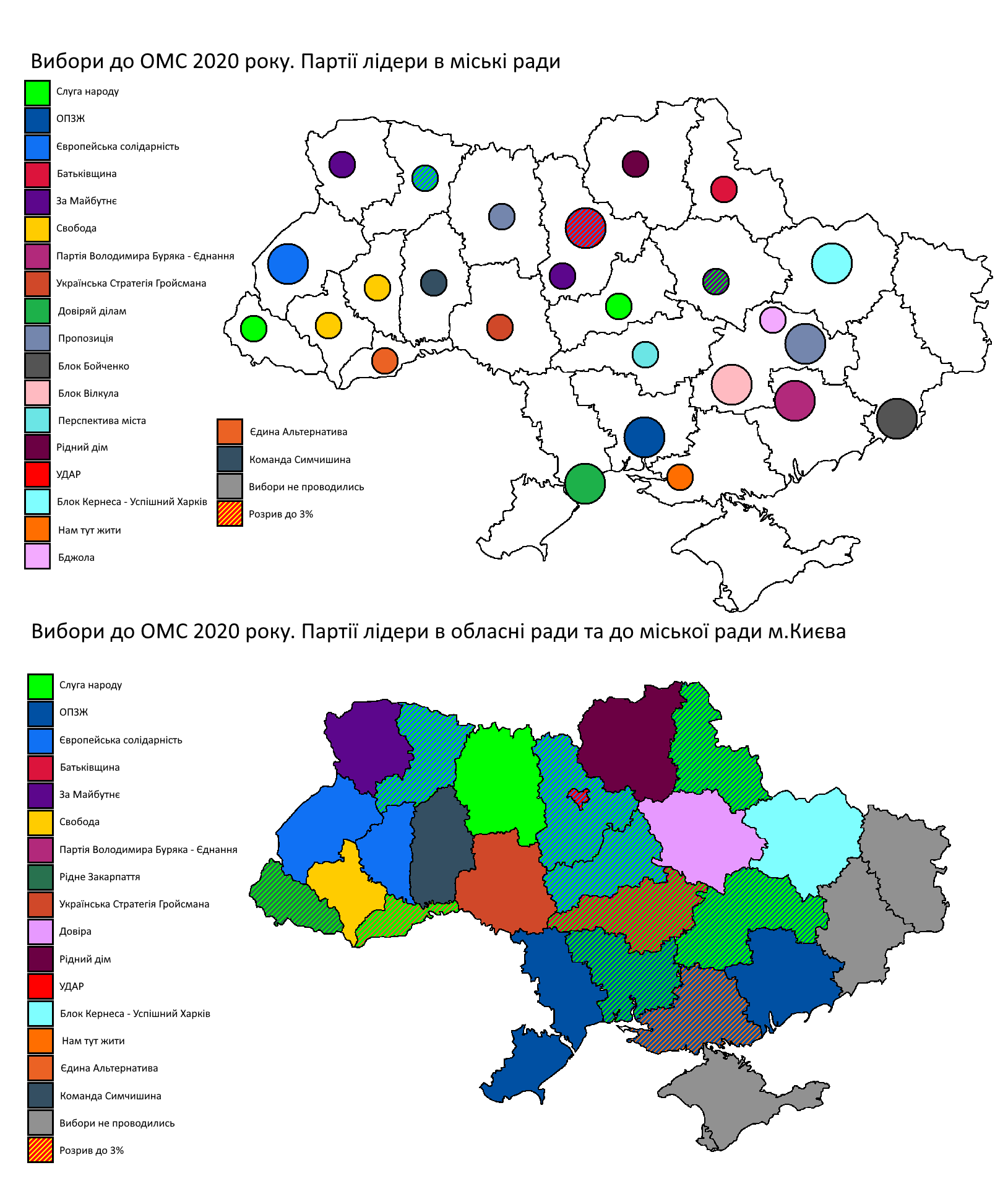
- Location of elections throughout Ukraine.

The 2020 Ukrainian local elections took place on Sunday 25 October 2020. In the election, deputies of district councils and rural townships were elected and elections for city mayors were held. In practice this meant that most voters had to fill out four ballots. On 15, 22 and 29 November and 6 December 2020 a second round of mayoral elections was held in cities with more than 75,000 voters where no candidate gained more than 50% of the votes.

Due to the 2014 Russian annexation of Crimea and loss of government control of parts of the Donetsk Oblast and Luhansk Oblast, no elections were held in parts of the two oblasts and in the Autonomous Republic of Crimea. Elections were also held in new raions that were formed following the 2020 administrative reform.

According to the results as published by the Central Election Commission of Ukraine the highest number of seats in the election was won by Servant of the People with 17.59% of local deputies nominated in the election by this party. Second place was for Fatherland with 12.39% of deputies and in third place was Opposition Platform — For Life with 11.75%. For the Future gained 11.42% of the total number of seats, European Solidarity 10.73% and Our Land 5.13%. Independent candidates won 661 mayoral elections. Of the remaining elected 733 mayors 30.74% of them were Servant of the People candidates, 12.43% represented For the Future, 7.24% Fatherland, 7.1% Opposition Platform — For Life, 6.15% Our Land and 5.6% European Solidarity. Turnout (on 25 October) was reported at 36.88% by the Central Election Commission, down from almost 47% in the 2015 local elections.

President Volodymyr Zelenskyy's party, Servant of the People, suffered setbacks in major cities across the country, including the capital Kyiv; meanwhile, both pro-European and pro-Russian parties made gains. In Ukraine's largest cities, not only Servant of the People but all national parties were beaten by local parties of individual city mayors.

== Overview ==
The estimated number of voters is 27.2 million people. The number of voters on the lists at polling stations is estimated at 28.1 million people and the number of polling stations was more than 29,000.

== Campaign ==
Late June 2020 the first street political advertising appeared on Ukrainian streets, although the election campaign for the election officially starts on 5 September. According to Ukrainian law, political campaigning outside election campaign periods is prohibited.

On 15 July 2020, parliament set the election date to 25 October 2020.

== Electoral system ==
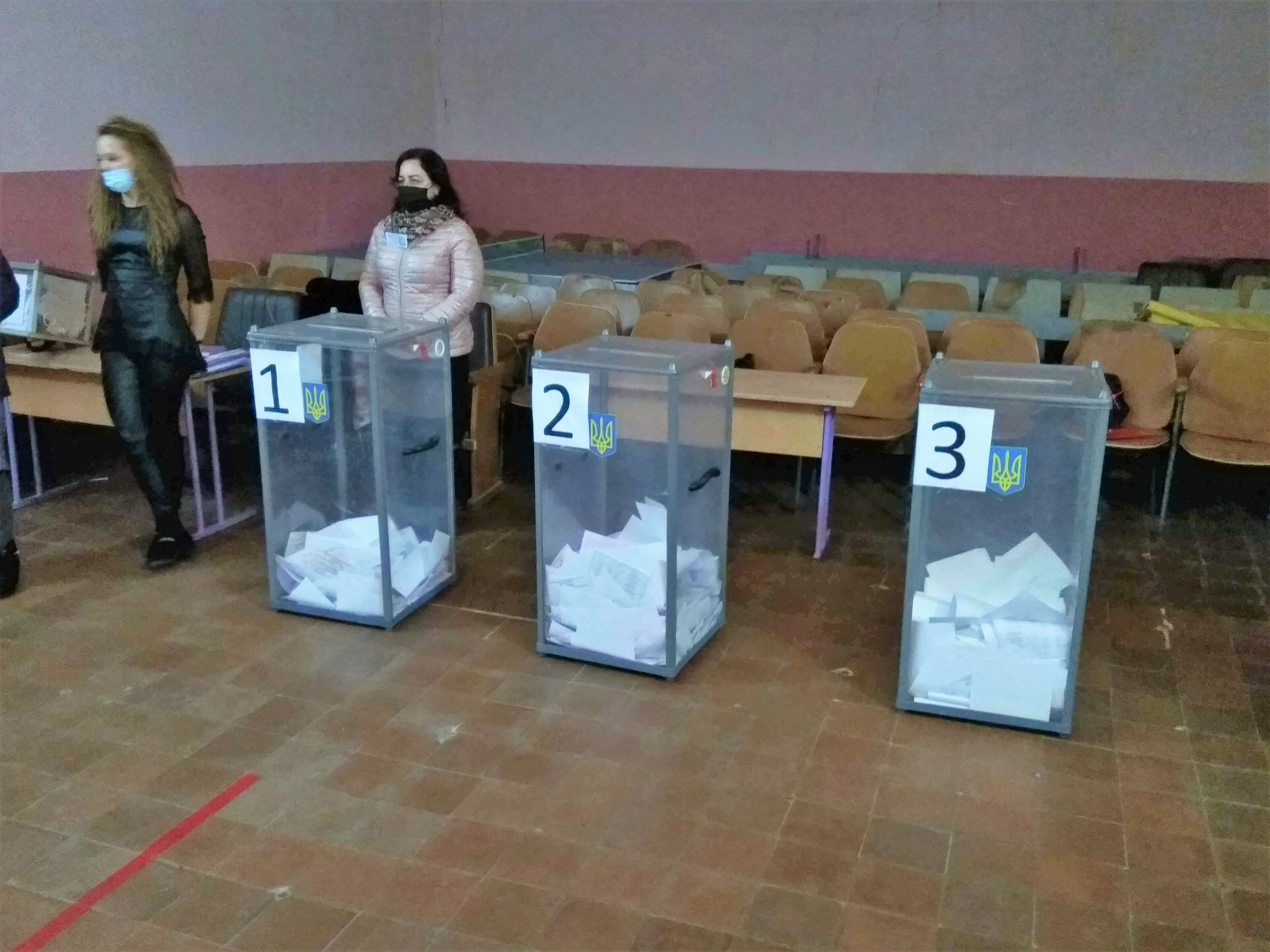
Voting station in Nova Pryluka on 25 October 2020

For the first time in Ukrainian local elections, all candidates had to pay a cash deposit to be able to take part in the elections. The size of this deposit depends on the size of the population of the place where the election is held. The lowest deposit were for candidates for mayors of Uzhhorod (19,000 hryvnias), Nikopol (20,000 hryvnias) and Melitopol (24,000 hryvnias); while the highest was for the mayoral candidates of Kyiv (445,000 hryvnias), Kharkiv (219,000 hryvnias), and Dnipro (157,000 hryvnias).

On all candidate lists, two out of every five candidates had to be female.

Candidate could only be self-nominated in places with a population of less than 10,000 voters, in all other cases candidates had to be nominated by political parties.

In the mayoral elections in cities with fewer than 75,000 voters mayors were elected under a majoritarian system; in a first-past-the-post system. In the other Ukrainian cities a candidate had to receive more than 50% of all votes cast to win in the first round of the election. If not, the two candidates who received the largest number of votes faced of in a second round, the candidate that receive a simple majority in the second round (no longer necessarily more than 50%) was elected mayor. November 15, November 22 and November 29 are the dates of the second round of mayoral elections in cities with more than 75,000 voters. (On 29 November the second round of the mayoral election of Chernivtsi only.) After Yuriy Vilkul redrew himself from the second round of the mayoral election in Kryvyi Rih this second round was postponed to 6 December 2020.

In populated places with up to 10 thousand voters the town was divided into constituencies, from 2 to 4 deputies of the local council were elected from each constituency under the relative majority system. In the other elections voters had to fill in two types of candidate lists - one for the whole city (district or region) and a separate for their electoral district (in which they had to write down the number of their favourite candidate themselves). The number 1 on the party list of the whole city was guaranteed a place in the local council if the party passed the election threshold. The election will was held with a specific open list system. In order to benefit from this open list system, a candidate in an electoral district needed to gain 25% of the total number of votes received by all parties that did overcame the electoral threshold divided by the number of seats in the local council minus the seats won by the number 1's on the party list of the whole city. The elections had a 5% election threshold.

In practice most voters had to fill out four ballots. Voters in Kyiv received only two ballots, for the election of the mayor of Kyiv and the Kyiv City Council election. In Poltava, Kropyvnytskyi, Kryvyi Rih, Kherson and Zhytomyr voters received an additional fifth ballot for candidates for the district councils in the city.

Deputies of local councils will receive no compensation for their work.

=== Non-voting areas ===
Due to the 2014 Russian annexation of Crimea, no elections in the Autonomous Republic of Crimea were held. (Note: Crimea is currently under dispute by Russia and Ukraine.) Loss of government control of parts of the Donetsk Oblast and Luhansk Oblast (to the self-proclaimed Donetsk People's Republic and Luhansk People's Republic) also means elections were not held in certain parts of these provinces. There were also no elections for the Donetsk Oblast Council and Luhansk Oblast Council as their functions are currently being performed by civil–military administrations.

== Results ==
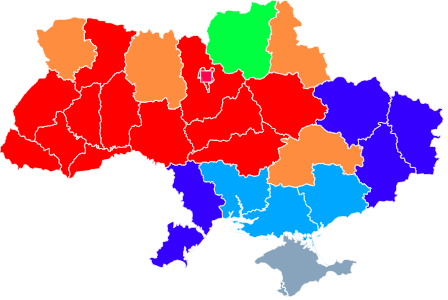
Summary of 2020 local elections - combined results of all oblast (province) councils' elections, raion (district) councils' elections in Donetsk' and Luhansk Oblast and the Kyiv City Council elections. Red and orange denote oblasts (and Kyiv as the city with special status) where pro-West parties got the most seats, blue and light blue denote oblasts where pro-Russian and euro-sceptical parties got the most seats. Green denotes oblasts where pro-West and pro-Russian/euro-sceptical parties got the same amount of seats.

Due to the new electoral system in which the elections were held, voting officials and the NGO Committee of Voters of Ukraine warned that the official publication of the election results would probably take several days.

=== Exit polls ===
Exit polls indicated that president Volodymyr Zelenskyy's party, Servant of the People, had suffered setbacks in Ukraine's major cities, including the capital Kyiv (Note: In the 2019 Ukrainian parliamentary election 36.46% of Kyivites had voted for Servant of the People, in the 2020 local elections an exit-poll of sociological group "Rating" predicted 9.5% of the votes for the party in the election for the Kyiv City Council and a fourth place for its mayoral candidate Iryna Vereshchuk with 8% of the votes.); it appeared that only in Zelenskyy's hometown Kryvyi Rih Servant of the People won the election with a slight margin, although they lost the mayoral election there.

The overall picture emerging from the exit polls was that pro-European and pro-Russian parties had appeared to have made gains, but that in Ukraine's major cities national parties had been beaten by local parties of individual city mayors.

=== Election summary ===
According to the results as published by the Central Election Commission of Ukraine, the highest number of seats in the election was won by Servant of the People with 17.59% of local deputies nominated in the election by this party. Second place was for Fatherland with 12.39% of deputies and in third place was Opposition Platform — For Life with 11.75%. For the Future gained 11.42% of the total number of seats, European Solidarity 10.73% and Our Land 5.13%. In total, 110 political parties received their representatives in local councils at various levels. Some of these were won by the parties Svoboda with 2.61%, Ukrainian Strategy with 1.72%, Proposition 1,66% and Radical Party of Oleh Lyashko with 1.62%. Almost half of all seats was won by parties that did not win seats in the 2019 Ukrainian parliamentary election. According to calculations made by Sociological group "RATING" 49% of all voters voted for local parties/non-parliamentary parties. Of the remaining voters 14.5% voted for Servant of the People, 13.7% for European Solidarity and 12.5% for Opposition Platform — For Life.

Most mayors elected were independent candidates, 661 nonpartisan politicians were elected mayor of a village, town or city. Of the remaining elected 733 mayors 30.74% of them were Servant of the People candidates, 12.43% represented For the Future, 7.24% Fatherland, 7.1% Opposition Platform — For Life, 6.15% Our Land, 5.6% European Solidarity, 3.83% Ukrainian Strategy and last came the party Trust with 3.14% (with its 23 mayors). Non-parliamentary parties, primarily the strictly local parties of city mayors, successfully performed in Ukraine's major cities. But in the elections of regional councils, parties represented in the Verkhovna Rada (Ukraine's parliament) still dominated.

Servant of the People showed its best results in Central Ukraine in the north of the country, as well as in the historical regions Transcarpathia and Bukovina. The results of the party in large cities and regional centers, in the regions of Galicia and in the Donbas were weaker. However, the pro-presidential party will be represented in all regional councils, and in the absolute majority of local councils in all regions of the country. European Solidarity did well in West and central Ukraine. Opposition Platform — For Life did well in South and Eastern Ukraine, although the local parties of city mayors (in particular in Odesa, Mykolaiv and Sloviansk) cost them support compared with its predecessor Opposition Bloc in the 2015 Ukrainian local elections. Fatherland showed its best results in Central and Northern Ukraine, as well as in a number of western regions. For the Future expectedly won the elections in Volyn Oblast, and also led its deputies to a number of regional councils in Ukraine's western and central regions. Proposition successfully performed only where it was represented by the current mayors of cities - in Dnipro, Zhytomyr and Mykolaiv. The same can be said for Svoboda, which won victory in cities where it had acting mayors, but compared with the 2015 local elections the party's electoral influence this time was limited to Western Ukraine. The parliamentary party Voice had some local success, having led its factions to the Lviv Oblast Council, to the city councils of Kyiv, Lviv, Cherkasy, a number of other city councils, including even in the Donbas.

=== Voter turnout ===
The nationwide turnout of the elections was 36.88% nationwide. The highest participation was in Western Ukraine (ranging from 40% to 45%), lowest was in Donetsk Oblast, Mykolaiv Oblast and Kharkiv Oblast (in all three slightly above 30%). An exit-poll of sociological group "Rating" concluded that more than half of the voters who came to the polling station were over 50 years old.

During the 2015 Ukrainian local elections nationwide voter turnout had been 46.62% of the population. 30% of respondents of the (above mentioned) "Rating" poll stated the COVID-19 pandemic in Ukraine and/or other health issues had prevented them from voting, 19% had not been in her/his place of voting, 15% were employed and working on election day, 14% did not know for whom to vote for and 12% of non-voters simply had no interest in the election.

The voter turnout at the second round of mayoral elections held in Lutsk, Kramatorsk, Ukrainka, Odesa, Sumy, Kherson and Kamianets-Podilskyi on 15 November was on average 24%. The highest turnout rate among seven cities was recorded in Kamianets-Podilskyi with its 34.29%. The lowest turnout was recorded in Sumy with 19.02%.

=== Mayoral elections (selected cities) ===
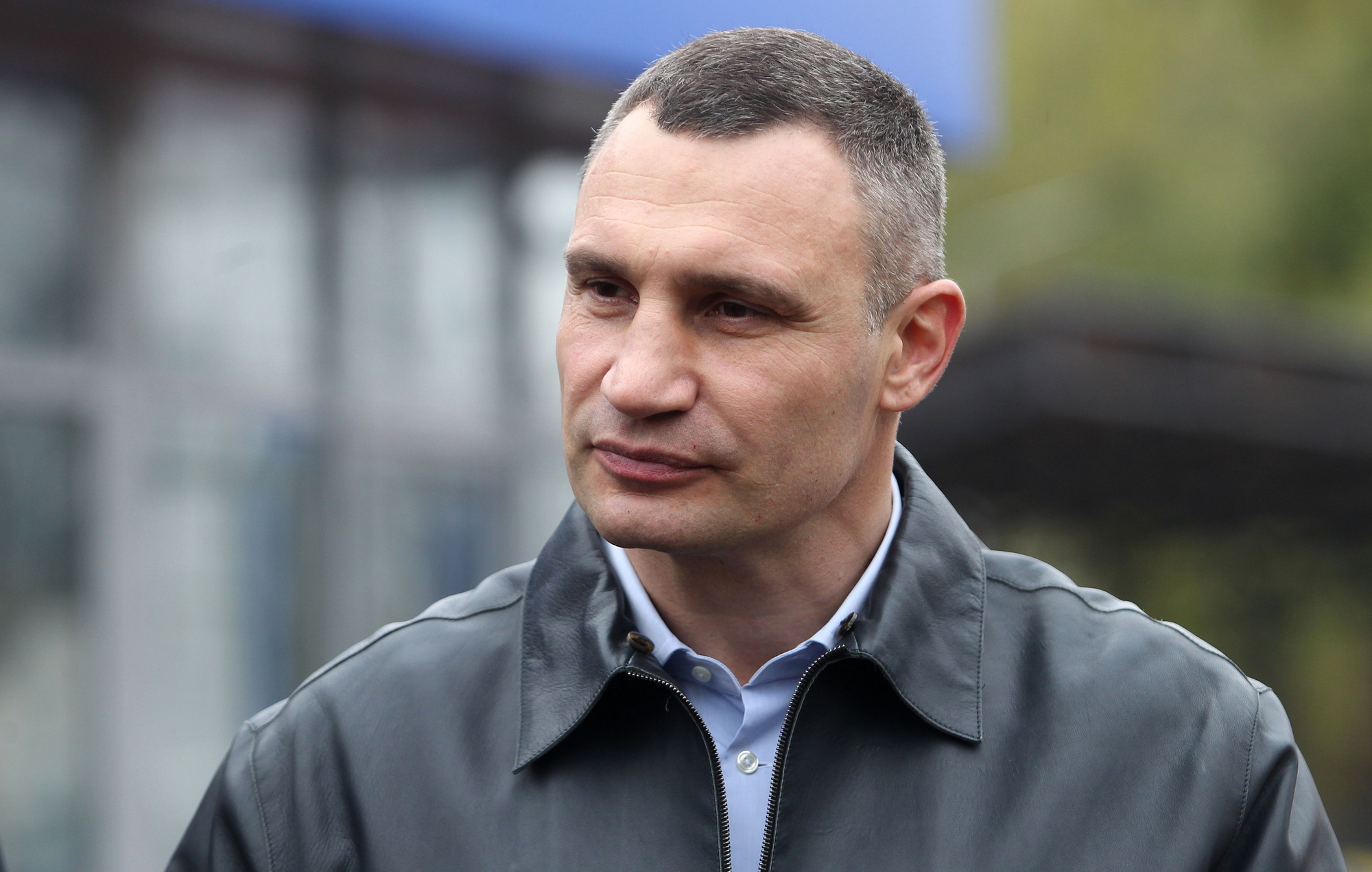
Kyiv Mayor Vitali Klitschko

==== Kyiv ====
In Kyiv, incumbent Mayor Vitali Klitschko was re-elected in the first round of the election with 50.52% of the votes; 365,161 people had voted for him. Klitschko was nominated by UDAR. In the election Oleksandr Popov (Opposition Platform — For Life) finished second after he secured 68,757 votes, Serhiy Prytula (Voice) gained 56,900 votes, Oleksiy Kucherenko (Batkivshchyna) 45,823 votes, Iryna Vereshchuk (Servant of the People) 39,321 votes and Andriy Palchevsky 38,360 votes.

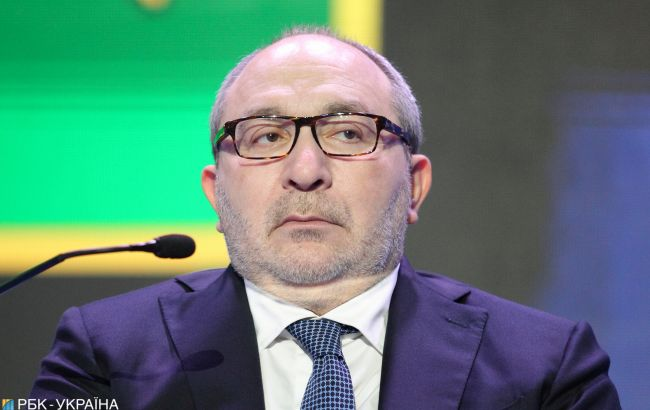
Kharkiv Mayor Hennadiy Kernes

==== Kharkiv ====
In Kharkiv, incumbent Mayor Hennadiy Kernes was re-elected in the first round of the election with 60.34% of the votes. Kernes had been nominated by his new political party Kernes Bloc — Successful Kharkiv. Oleksandr Feldman for Opposition Platform — For Life finished second in the election with 14.32%. Third place went to incumbent Governor of Kharkiv Oblast Oleksiy Kucher of Servant of the People with 7.24%. Voter turnout was 31.3%.

During his re-election, Kernes himself was not in Kharkiv and he had not appeared in public since 23 August 2020, after becoming infected with COVID-19. On election day Kernes was (since 17 September 2020) hospitalized in Germany in university hospital Charité. At the time of his election his party assured that Kernes was about to return to Kharkiv to fulfil his duties as Mayor. Kernes died of complications from COVID-19 on 17 December 2020.

On 31 October 2021, a snap mayoral election in Kharkiv was held to determinate Kernes successor. The election commission declared Kernes fellow party member Ihor Terekhov the winner of the election with 50.66% of the votes. Mikhail Dobkin finished the race in second place with 28.4% of the vote. The candidate from European Solidarity, Oleksandr Skoryk, finished third with 5,36% and all other candidates received less than 5% of the vote. In this by-election voter turnout was 28.32%.

==== Odesa ====
Second round mayoral results by districts

In Odesa, incumbent Mayor Gennadiy Trukhanov (nominated by the Truth and Deeds party) failed to be re-elected in the first round of the election. In the first round Trukhanov received 38% of the votes against Opposition Platform — For Life candidate Mykola Skoryk's 19%. (In the first round) Petro Obukhov of European Solidarity took third place with 11,5% of the votes and fourth spot was occupied by Oleh Filimonov of Servant of the People with 10,09%.

Trukhanov and Skoryk took part in the final round of the election. Trukhanov defeated Skoryk in the second round of the mayoral election on 15 November 2020, 54.28% of the voters voted for him.

==== Dnipro ====
In Dnipro, a second round of the mayoral election was held between incumbent mayor Borys Filatov and Zahid Krasnov which was won by Filatov with 80.61% of the votes.

In the first round of the election Filatov (nominated by Proposition) had gained 46.41% of the votes, Krasnov (nominated by Community Power) 13.15%, Oleksandr Vilkul (Bloc Vilkul — Ukrainian perspective) 12.95%, Serhiy Nikitin (Opposition Platform — For Life) 9.15% and Serhiy Ryzhenko (Servant of the People) 8.71%.

== Conduct ==
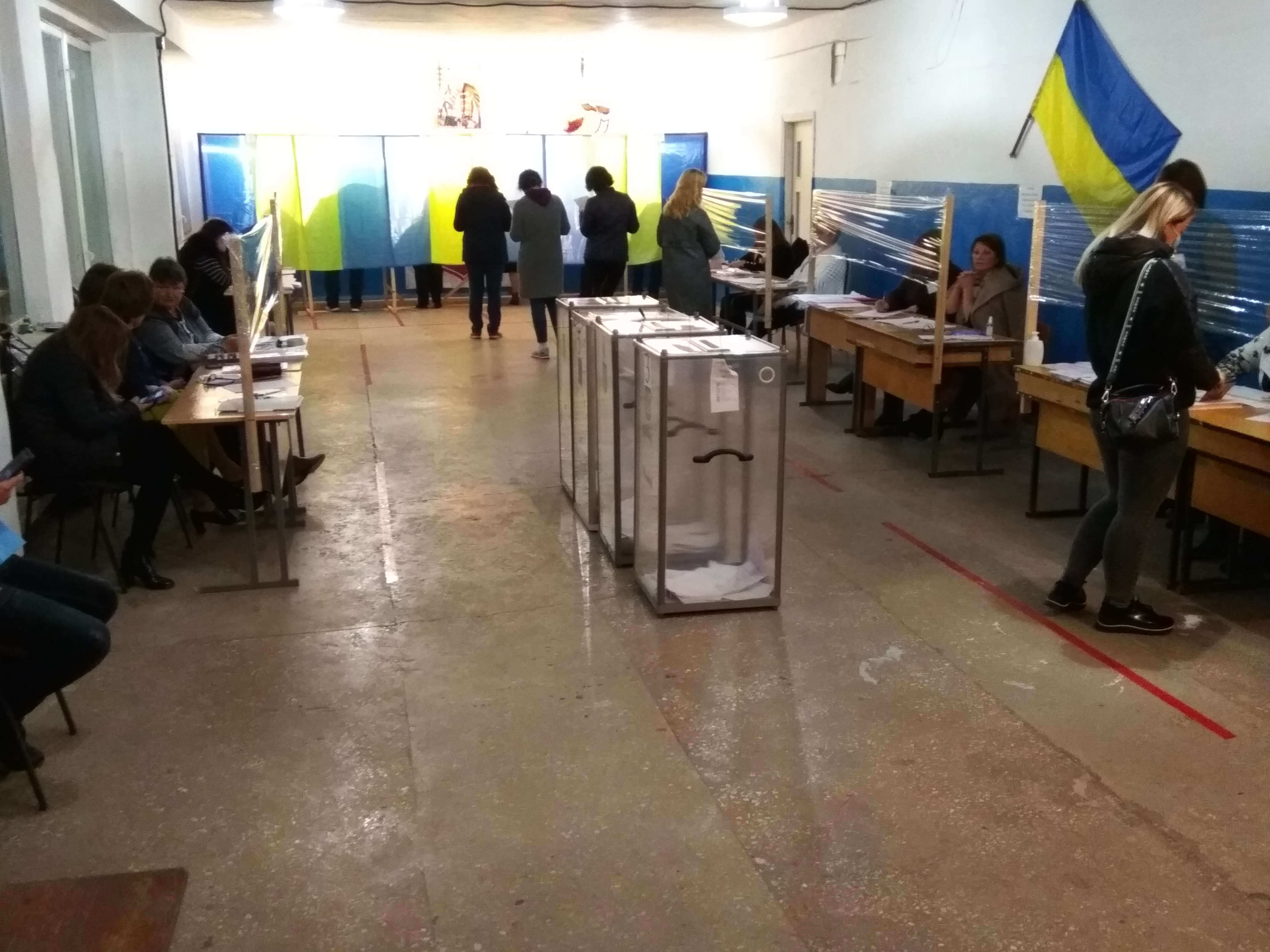
Voting station in Turbiv on 25 October 2020

The day after the election (26 October 2020) OSCE's Office for Democratic Institutions and Human Rights stated that the election had been "calm and well-organized". It also stated that a non-official poll that had been called for by president Volodymyr Zelenskyy had created "some illegal political advantage" for Zelenskyy's party, Servant of the People.

The NGO Committee of Voters of Ukraine stated that the second round of mayoral elections on 22 November were "held in accordance with democratic standards" but that in five cities of eleven voting cities its observer had uncovered attempts at bribing voters.
