= 2010 Ukrainian presidential election =

Election of Viktor Yanukovych

- 17 January 2010 (first round); 7 February 2010 (second round)
- Turnout: 66.51% (first round); 68.81% (second round) ▼8.47 pp
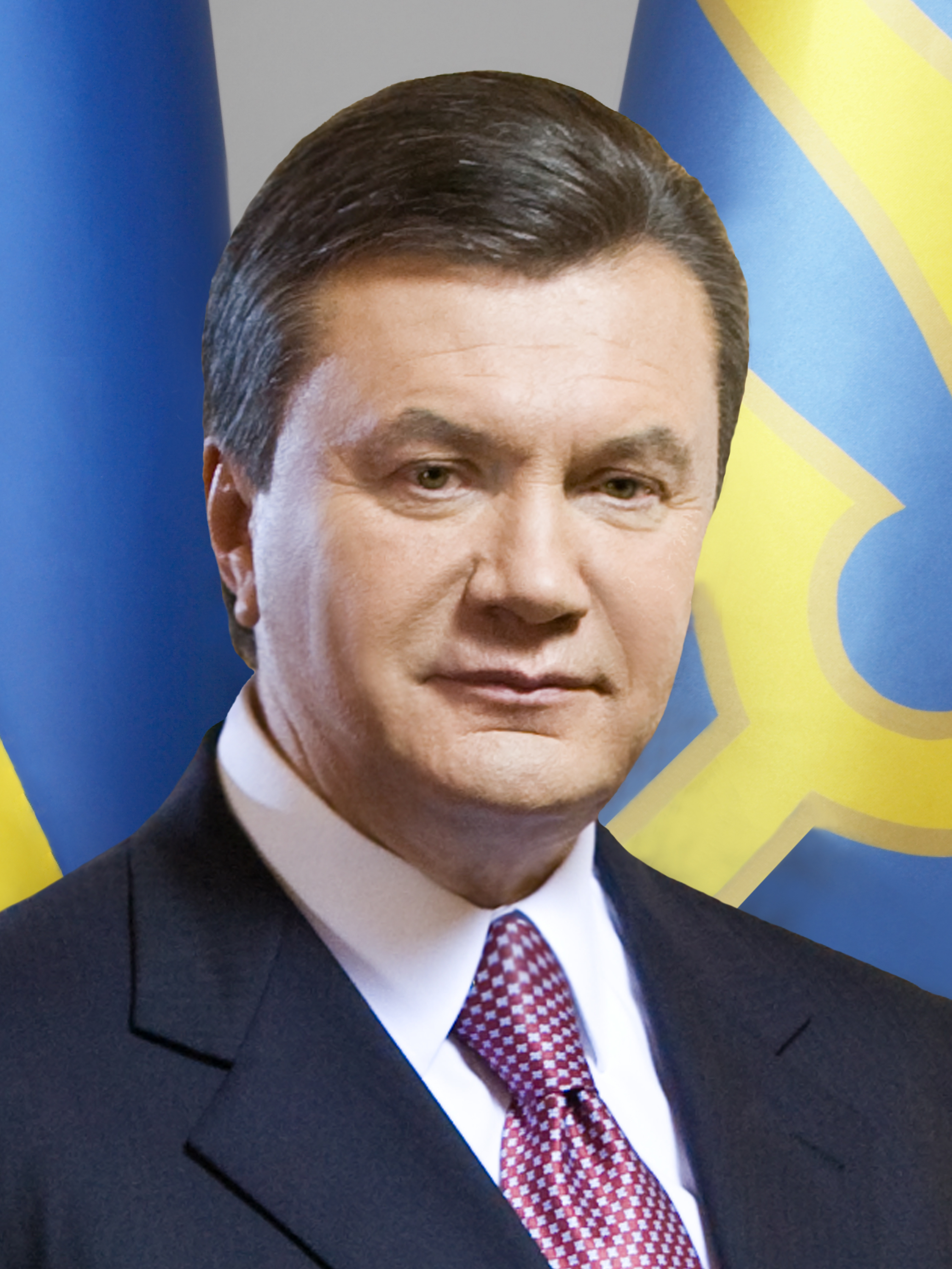

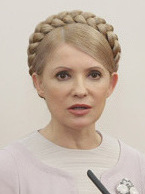
Nominee	Viktor Yanukovych	Yulia Tymoshenko
Party	Party of Regions	Batkivshchyna
Popular vote	12,481,266	11,593,357
Percentage	49.55%	46.03%
President before election
Viktor Yushchenko
Our Ukraine
Elected President
Viktor Yanukovych
Party of Regions

Presidential elections were held in Ukraine on 17 January 2010. As no candidate received a majority of the vote, a run-off election was held between Prime Minister Yulia Tymoshenko and opposition leader Viktor Yanukovych on 7 February.

On 14 February, Yanukovych was declared President-elect and winner with 50% of the popular vote. According to Article 104 of Ukraine's Constitution, the president had to be sworn into office within 30 days of the official declaration of the results. Parliament subsequently scheduled Yanukovych's inauguration for 25 February.

On 17 February, the Supreme Administrative Court of Ukraine suspended the results following an appeal by Tymoshenko. The court suspended the Central Election Commission's ruling that had declared Yanukovych as the winner of the election, but did not postpone or cancel his inauguration. On 20 February, Tymoshenko withdrew her appeal.

== Background ==
In Ukraine, the previous two presidential first-round ballots had traditionally occurred in October.

According to the Constitution of Ukraine, regular elections of the president of Ukraine are held on the last Sunday of the last month of the fifth year of the term of authority of the president of Ukraine. In the event of pre-term termination of authority of the president of Ukraine, elections of the president of Ukraine are held within ninety days from the day of the president's office falling vacant.

Early presidential elections can be held in case of a president's resignation, ill-health, impeachment or death.

The president of Ukraine is elected by the citizens of Ukraine for a five-year term, on the basis of universal, equal and direct suffrage, by secret ballot.

A candidate seeking election must be a citizen of Ukraine who has attained the age of thirty-five, has the right to vote, has resided in Ukraine for the past ten years prior to the day of elections, and has command of the state language as required by Article 103 of Ukraine's Constitution.

On 1 April 2009, the Verkhovna Rada designated 25 October 2009, as the date for the first round of voting. Within a week, President Yushchenko filed an appeal with the Constitutional Court against Verkhovna Rada's 25 October date. The President's appeal argued that his inauguration on 23 January 2005, was the commencement of his five-year term of office and as such the next presidential election must be set for the last Sunday before 23 January 2010, in accordance with Article 103.

On 13 May 2009, the court ruled in Yushchenko's favor, striking out the 25 October date for the elections. On 14 May 2009, the Party of Regions leader Viktor Yanukovych stated that the presidential elections should now be held on 17 January 2010.

On 23 June 2009, the Parliament rescheduled the date for the election for Sunday, 17 January 2010, with 399 lawmakers out of 442 lawmakers registered in the session hall voted "for" the resolution "On appointing of regular election of President of Ukraine".

Minister of Internal Affairs Yuriy Lutsenko said on 21 September 2009 that he believes that the lists of voters at this presidential election will be more qualitative and more "clear" than it was at previous elections because "double names" were removed from the list. The same day the Party of Regions complained about a lot of mistakes in that list and that the number of voters fell in the Southern Ukraine and Eastern Ukraine and increased by 0.5–1% in Western Ukraine. It is the first time the state register of voters will be used in a Ukrainian election.

== Electoral system ==
Ukraine's president is elected by a two-round first-past-the-post voting system. The first round of voting was held on 17 January 2010. As no candidate in the first-round ballot had 50% or more votes the two highest polling candidates faced off in a second-round ballot which was held on 7 February 2010. Viktor Yanukovych received the highest vote (48.96%) and was expected to be declared the winner. Under Ukrainian law presidents elect must take the oath within 30 days of the declaration of the poll, which must be made before 17 February 2010.

On 24 July 2009, the Verkhovna Rada (Ukrainian parliament) amended the law on presidential elections reducing the official presidential campaign from 120 to 90 days. Outgoing President Viktor Yushchenko refused to sign the new law and lodged an appeal in Ukraine's Constitutional Court, but failed to outline in detail the grounds for any appeal. The speaker of the parliament, Volodymyr Lytvyn, signed the amended law into existence following the President's refusal to sign it, despite this being illegal.

Maryna Stavniychuk, deputy head of the presidential secretariat and the President's spokesperson on legal matters, stated "It is obvious that there are no serious political or legal grounds to consider the issue of the possible disruption of the presidential elections in Ukraine."

The amended law on the presidential elections required candidates to pay a ₴2,500,000 (~308,000 USD) nomination deposit which will only be refunded to the two highest polling candidates that progressed to the second round of voting.

On 19 October 2009, the Central Election Commission of Ukraine formed the 225 territorial election districts needed for carrying out the election.

20 October 2009, Ukraine's Constitutional Court announced its ruling declaring unconstitutional five aspects of the new law of the presidential election. Voters abroad will no longer have to be registered with the Ukrainian consulate in order to cast a vote. The courts will retain the right to consider without limitations any application or appeal in respect to a candidate's registration or the conduct of the election. The cancellation of absentee ballots remains as does the 90-day election period and the ₴2.5 million deposit. The ruling of the Constitutional Court is not expected to impact seriously on the election as the amended legislation remains in place.

On 21 December 2009, the Central Election Commission of Ukraine formed 113 foreign polling stations.

Voters are permitted to vote at home during the presidential election.

=== Costs ===
The Central Election Commission has estimated the budget of the holding of regular presidential elections in Ukraine at ₴1.5 billion, (approximately 200 million US dollars) with additional costs required by candidates to fund their campaigns.

On 26 November, the Central Election Commission stated a total of ₴1.314 billion is required to hold the presidential election, including 192.2 million in 2009 and 1.122 billion in 2010.

Assessments by political analysts show that each presidential candidate will have to spend at least US$150–200mn to promote himself; this includes buying story lines in the media, visual advertising, canvassing, printing political material and, work with electoral commissions.

Chairman of the Committee of Voters of Ukraine, Oleksandr Chernenko, also commented that presidential candidates will spend 1 billion US dollars on the election campaign

The cost of the run-off ballot is estimated to be US$119 million

=== Timetable ===
Ukraine's Central Electoral Commission (CEC) has set the following timetable for the conduct of the election:

- 19 October: Official 90-day Election Campaign period commences
- 20 October to 6 November: Nominations open
- 9 November: Deadline for nomination document/submissions

CEC has five days to assess and approve or reject nominations

- 11 November: Deadline for candidates to submit any corrections to documentation
- 13 November: CEC to finalize registration of nominations
- 15 November: CEC to publish nomination lists of candidates

CEC provides certified copies of the voters list to all candidates. Within Three days of registration Candidates must provide a statement of assets and income. Candidates allowed to commence official campaign one day after registration is finalized.

- 9 December: Foreign polling stations to be set up.
- 15 December: CEC to approve ballot paper format ready for printing.
- 21 December: Deadline for withdrawals of candidature.
- 2 January: Last day for public opinion polls to be published prior to election.
- 9 January: All ballot papers to be printed and ready for distribution to polling stations/districts.
- 15 January: Last day of public campaigning before polling day
- 17 January: Election (first-round ballot) polling commences 8 am and closes 10 pm
- 22 January: Tabulation of overseas and territorial polling place to be completed
- 27 January: Determination of voting results and declaration of poll

As no single candidate had 50% or more of the total recorded vote the two highest polling candidates faced off in a second-round ballot. The candidate with the highest vote in the second round will win the election.

- 7 February: Final round run-off ballot
- 17 February: Declaration of the election must be made within 10 days following the ballot or within 3 days of receipt of the official election protocols.

According to Article 104 of Ukraine's Constitution the President-elect within 30 days of the declaration of the poll must be sworn into office before Ukraine's parliament

- 25 February: Viktor Yanukovych is sworn into office.

== Candidates ==
The following candidates nominated for the presidential elections (in ballot paper order) A total of 18 candidates ran for president.

- Inna Bohoslovska, member of Verkhovna Rada, unaffiliated (block Party of Regions)
- Mykhailo Brodskyy, leader of the Party of Free Democrats
- Anatoliy Hrytsenko, member of Our Ukraine, former Minister of Defense
- Yuriy Kostenko, Ukrainian People's Party deputy of Verkhovna Rada for Our Ukraine – People's Self-Defense Bloc
- Volodymyr Lytvyn, parliamentary speaker
- Oleksandr Moroz, Socialist Party of Ukraine, former chairman of the Verkhovna Rada
- Oleksandr Pabat, Peoples' Salvation Army
- Vasyl Protyvsikh, Independent
- Serhiy Ratushniak, Mayor of Uzhhorod
- Oleg Riabokon, Independent lawyer, Managing Partner in Magisters law firm from 1997 to 2009
- Petro Symonenko, leader of the Communist Party of Ukraine
- Liudmyla Suprun, People's Democratic Party
- Yulia Tymoshenko, incumbent prime minister leader of Yulia Tymoshenko Bloc
- Serhiy Tihipko, former CEO of the National Bank of Ukraine endorsed by Labour Ukraine
- Oleh Tyahnybok, All-Ukrainian Union "Freedom", deputy of the Lviv Regional Council
- Viktor Yushchenko, incumbent president and member of Our Ukraine
- Viktor Yanukovych, Party of Regions former prime minister and runner-up candidate in the 2004 presidential election
- Arseniy Yatsenyuk, former chairman of the Verkhovna Rada member of Our Ukraine and Front for Change party

=== Excluded candidates ===
All together the Central Election Commission had rejected sixteen applications for candidate registration.

The Central Election Commission refused to register Oleksandr Hordiichuk, Olena Osnach, Oleksandr Luzan, Hanna Kostiv, Oleksandr Vaschenko, Oleksandr Ohorodnikov, Vasyl Handula, Yurii Petlevana, Petro Rekalo, Anatolii Polischuk, Mykhailo Hamaniuk, Oleksandr Vretyk, Artem Polezhaka, Oleh Omelchenko, Natalia Vitrenko, Mykola Melnychenko, Serhii Martyian and Serhiy Schetinin. The reason stated was due to errors in their documentation, qualifications or failure to pay the required ₴2.5 million nomination deposit.

Nominations by parties and candidates to run in the election closed on 6 November 2009. Eighteen candidates in all have been nominated. The Central Election Committee had until 11 November 2009 to process documentation and finalize the election list.

== Campaign ==
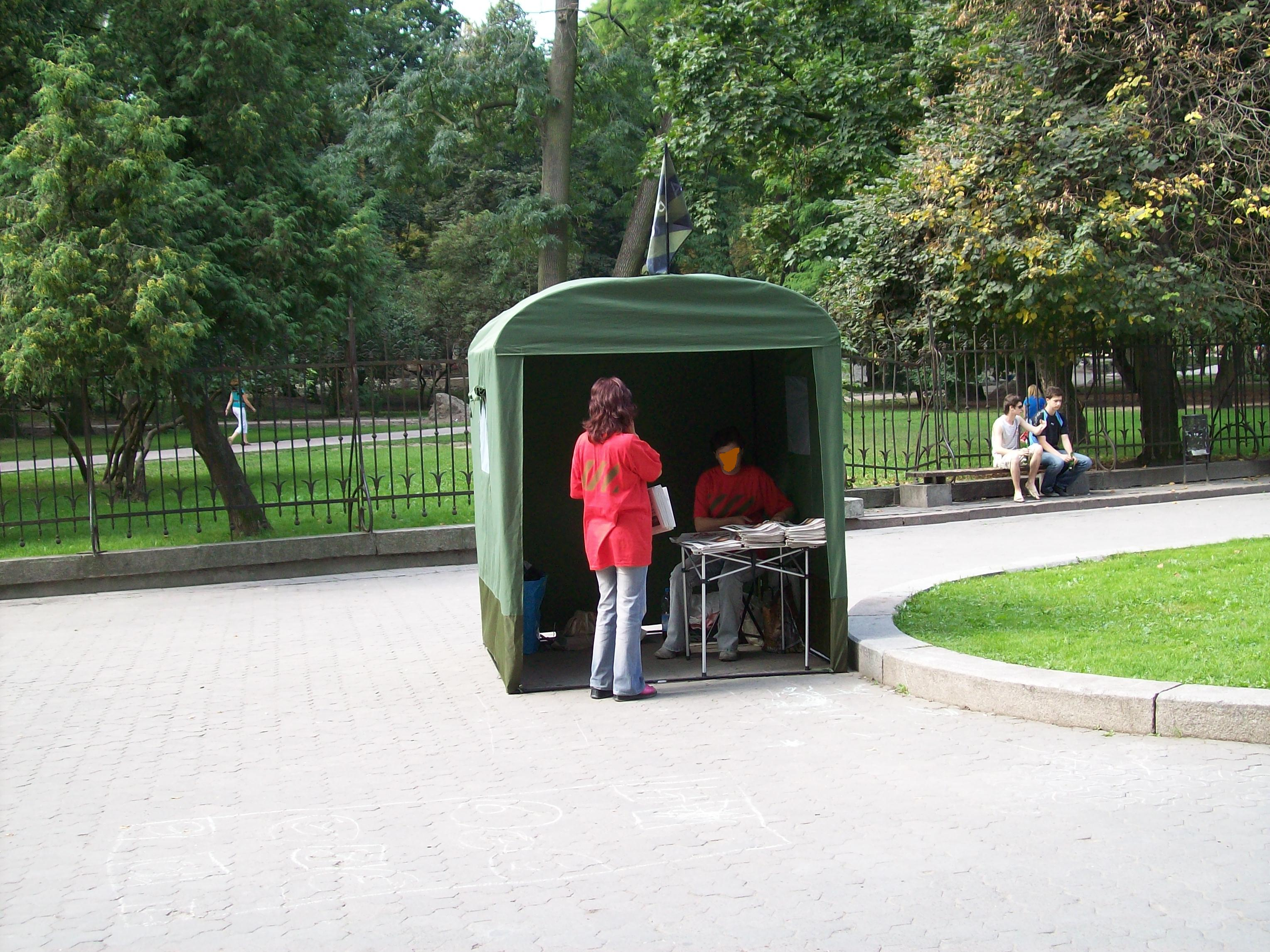
Yatsenyuk promotion (August 2009)

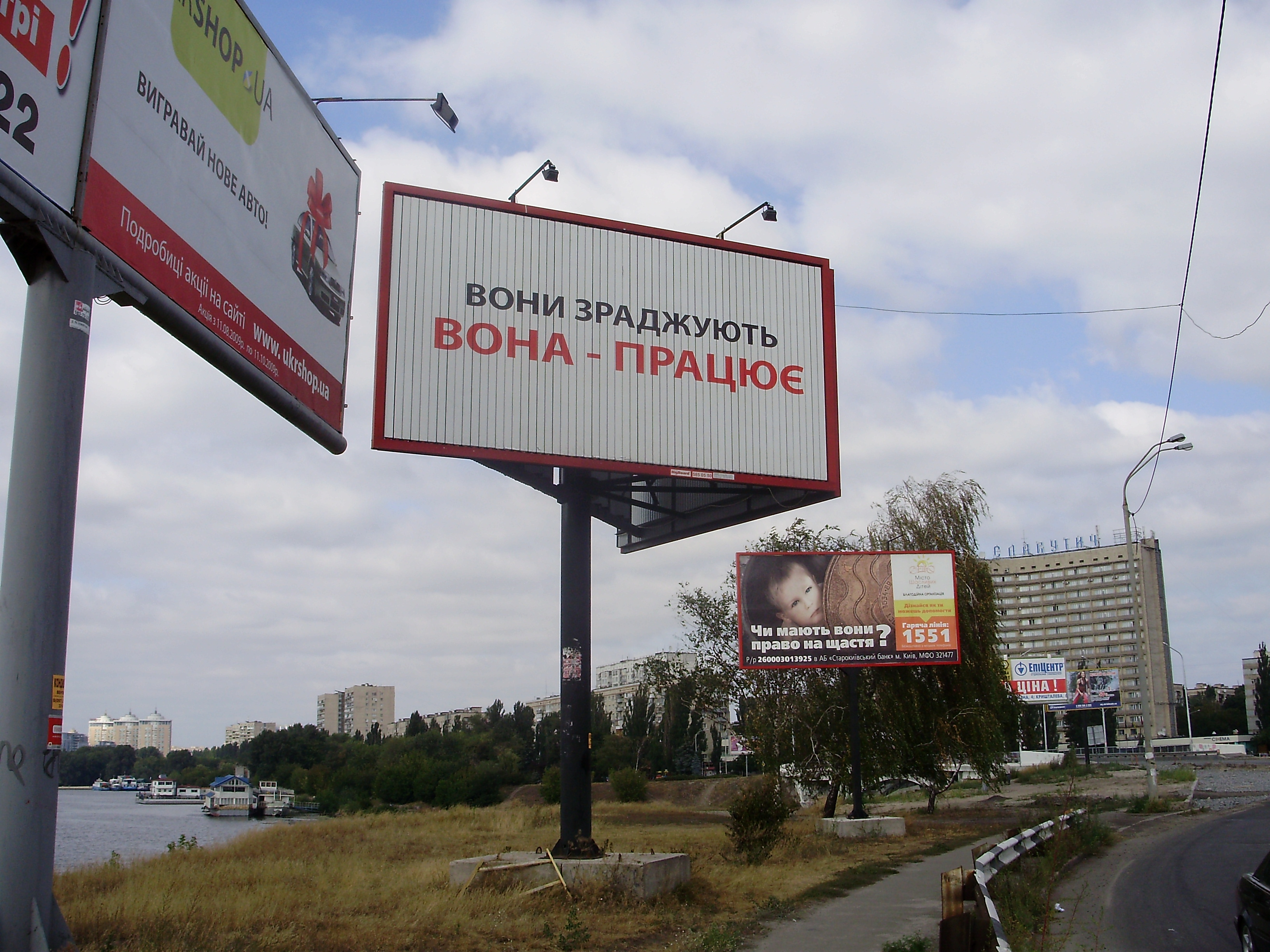
"She Works" billboard (August 2009)

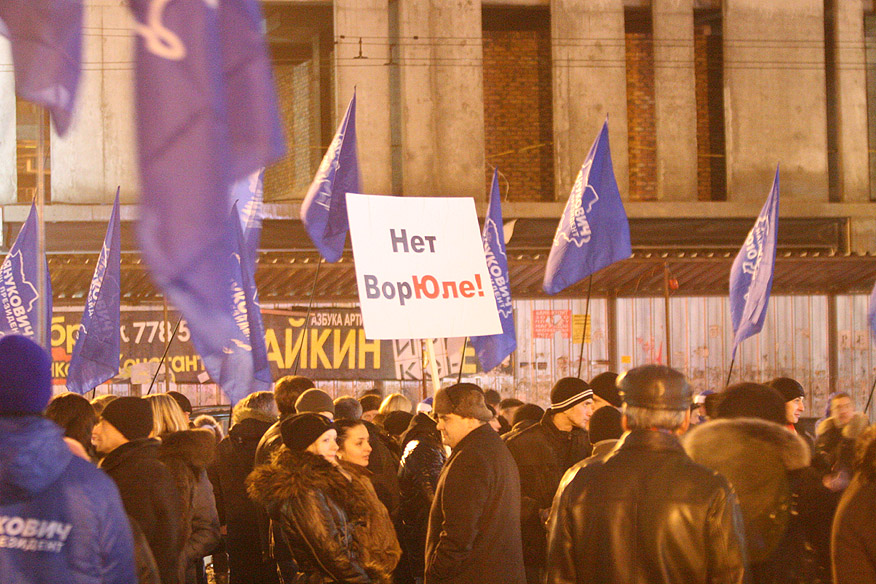
Нет Ворюле!, anti-Tymoshenko placard,
rally Dnipropetrovsk, 25 Dec 2009

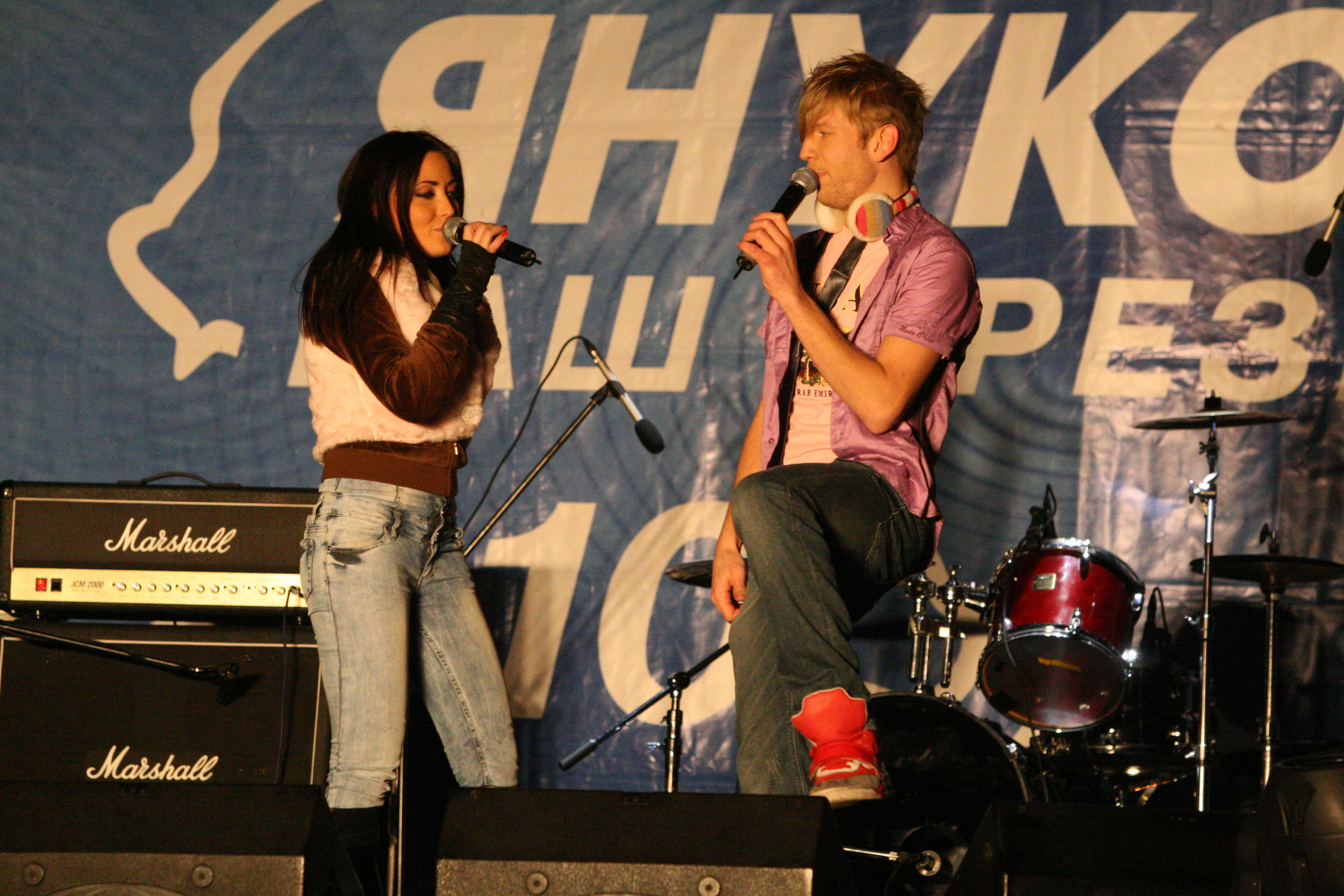
Concert and rally for Yanukovych,
Dnipropetrovsk, 25 Dec 2009

The official presidential campaign commenced on 19 October 2009, with nominations opening on 20 October through to 6 November. The "unofficial" campaign had already started during the summer of 2009 with tents of Front for Change distributing campaign material for Arseniy Yatsenyuk Front for Changes and large scale and billboards stating Others make problems. She Works (in the colors and letter type of Bloc Yulia Tymoshenko), and photos of Sergei Tigipko displayed in most Ukrainian towns and TV-adds of Yulia Tymoshenko and Volodymyr Lytvyn shown on national TV. According to Tymoshenko the "She Works" billboards were paid for by the Fatherland Party, and therefore they were also "social". Party of Regions deputy Andry Paruby officially requested that the prosecutor-general's office investigates the sources of financing of Tymoshenko's advertisements. He suggested that public money might have been used.

Ukraine has proven more than once the degree to which the success of an election campaign depends on the level of professionalism and political spin techniques applied in election campaigns.

The most popular candidates are former prime minister and leader of the Opposition party Viktor Yanukovych and current prime minister Yulia Tymoshenko.

Incumbent president Viktor Yushchenko's support has slumped from a high of 52% in 2004 to below 3% in Ukrainian public opinion polls. Most political commentators regard him as a heavy underdog who stands little chance of being re-elected to a second term of office. A recent public opinion poll indicated that 83% of Ukrainians will not vote for Yushchenko.

On 5 April 2009, Arseniy Yatseniuk, former chairman of the Verkhovna Rada, announced his intention to run in the election. His popularity has slowly risen to around 12–14% and is now in third place behind Yanukovych and Tymoshenko.

According to Oxford Analytica the working relationship between President Yushchenko and his Prime Minister Tymoshenko will be further complicated by the search of Yushchenko for partners other than Tymoshenko's Bloc Yulia Tymoshenko who will ensure his re-election. Since Yushchenko dismissed Tymoshenko as prime minister on 8 September 2005, the relations between Tymoshenko and Yushchenko, including the Secretariat of the President of Ukraine, have been hostile. In an interview with the Frankfurter Allgemeine Zeitung of 11 February 2009 Tymoshenko said her recent conflict with the president is a political competition and not ideological antagonisms and she emphasized that the "election struggle for the next presidential elections has virtually begun." During a visit to Brussels on 10 February 2009, Chairman of the Verkhovna Rada Volodymyr Lytvyn seconded that. In late February 2009, President Yushchenko called on all Ukrainian politicians to "stop the presidential election campaign until July 1."

On 16 June 2009, Tymoshenko accused Yushchenko, Yatseniuk and Yanukovych of having the same campaign headquarters financed by (businessman and) RosUkrEnergo owner Dmytro Firtash.

Tymoshenko stated on 22 June 2009 that "There is a team work on solving these issues between the President and the Prime Minister. Professional advice and support of the President will help the government during difficult times".

On 11 August 2009, Russian president Medvedev in an open letter directed at Viktor Yushchenko, raised a number of issues of concern related to the perceived "anti-Russian position of the current Ukrainian authorities". The Russian president's comments were considered by analysts and others including the president of Ukraine as Russia's interference in Ukraine's domestic affairs.

On 12 September 2009, a tour called "With Ukraine in Heart" in support of Yulia Tymoshenko kick-started on Kyiv's Maidan Nezalezhnosti. The most popular singers and bands of Ukraine took part in the tour.

On 14 September 2009, the Communist Party of Ukraine, the Social Democratic Party of Ukraine (united), the Justice Party and the Union of Leftists signed an agreement on creating the bloc of leftists and center-leftists and a unitary participation in the presidential election.

The Pechersky district court in Kyiv on 22 September 2009, banned "any unfair advertisement" against Tymoshenko in response to a video (allegedly made by the Party of Regions), which claimed that Tymoshenko does not deliver on her promises. The video reportedly mocked Tymoshenko's main campaign slogan "She Works," which is frequently used in her advertisements.

In October 2009 representatives of the Western Ukrainian intelligentsia called upon the candidates Yushchenko, Yatseniuk, Hrytsenko and "other representatives of national democratic forces" to withdraw in favour of Tymoshenko.

On 6 October 2009, the incumbent President Yushchenko warned that there may be attempts to use regional television and radio companies to create advantages for the government in the election campaign.

On 17 October 2009, The Social-Democratic Party of Ukraine has backed a decision to create the bloc of left and center-left political forces and supported the leader of the Communist Party of Ukraine Petro Symonenko as a single candidate for the post of the Ukrainian president from left political forces

19 October was the official start of the Elections campaign 90-day period.

20 October candidate nomination registration opens. Oleg Riabokon first candidate to officially nominate.

On 20 October, Ukrainian Parliament voted to amend Ukraine's Constitution (390 out of 438 in favor) to remove provision related to Parliamentary immunity that prevents a member of parliament from being criminally liable, detained or arrested without the consent of the Verkhovna Rada. An earlier proposal to only remove immunity from the Parliament was defeated. The proposed new provisions also limits presidential immunity. The president can not be detained or arrested without the consent of the parliament; however, on conviction of an offense the president automatically loses office. The proposed amendments have been forwarded to Ukraine's Constitutional Court for review and will need to be reaffirmed by the parliament in February 2010.

Political analyst and senior policy fellow at the European Council on Foreign Relations, Andrew Wilson, has cast doubt on Arseny Yatseniuk, currently Ukraine's third most popular candidate, ability to maintain his meteoritic rise following a decline in his ratings dropping from a high of 13% in August to 9% in October. "Yatseniuk must look to plan B"

On 6 November the nominations were closed. The same day a Viktor Yushchenko aide amidst concern over the recent flu outbreak which claimed 97 lives has proposed the cancellation of the January election until May 2010 which would extend the President's term of office a further six months. The World Health Organization has stated that they expect a second and third wave of infections to occur in Spring (April to June) bringing into further doubt Yushchenko's proposed cancellation. Under Ukraine's Constitution the elections can be canceled if a State of Emergency is declared. Also on 6 November 2009, the Emergencies Ministry stated it saw no grounds to introduce a state of emergency in Ukraine due to the flu epidemic. On 9 November President Yushchenko said the same.

Serhy Lutsenko, the deputy head of the People's Self-Defense party expressed on 11 November 2009 concern that Viktor Yushchenko will support his past rival, Viktor Yanukovych, in a run-off election between Yanukovych and Tymoshenko.

On 3 December 2009, the Ukrainian National Council on Television and Radio Broadcasting complained that certain TV channels did not give equal conditions to all presidential candidates.

On 11 December 2009, the European People's Party EPP called on "Ukraine's democratic forces" to unite around the most democratic candidate who will win through to the presidential run-off. All-Ukrainian Union "Fatherland", the Our Ukraine People's Union, and the People's Movement of Ukraine (Rukh) are the EPP's partners in Ukraine.

On 11 December 2009, candidate Viktor Yanukovych stated that his Party of Regions possesses information that "government representatives are currently "motivating" the chairmen of election commissions and seeking options for victory in every possible way" and called for his supporters go to the Maidan Nezalezhnosti in case of election fraud.

Bloc Yulia Tymoshenko proposes a referendum on the format of Constitutional reform - Parliamentary versus Presidential system of governance.

=== Issues ===
The list of major issues raised in the campaign included

- The economy
- Health
- Housing
- Ukraine's membership of NATO and CSTO
- European integration
- Relations with Russia
- Constitutional reform
- UEFA Euro 2012 football tournament
- Status of the Russian language

According to the Director of the Penta Center for Political Studies Volodymyr Fesenko, there were only small differences in the election programs of the various candidates.

== Opinion polls ==
According to an article in Kyiv Post in November 2009, Yanukovych's popularity in the Donbas was fading and Donbas voters voted mainly for Yanukovych to keep Tymoshenko from power.

A poll released 15 December 2009 by the International Foundation for Electoral Systems has indicated that Viktor Yanukovych (31%) as the most likely to win the presidential election in a contest with Yulia Tymoshenko (19%). All other candidates were below 5% with Viktor Yushchenko on 3.5% with a negativity rating of 83%. The survey also indicated that Ukrainians are pessimistic about the socio-political situation in the country. Seventy-four percent believe Ukraine is on a path toward instability and more than nine in ten Ukrainians are dissatisfied with the economic (96%) and political situation (92%) in the country.

According to other recent opinion polls, the Party of Regions candidate Viktor Yanukovych (25.0% to 33.3%) was placed first among viable presidential candidates, with Prime Minister Yulia Tymoshenko (15.5% to 18.4%) coming in second, and Front for Change candidate Arseniy Yatsenyuk (6.7% to 14.5%) in third place. Incumbent President, Viktor Yushchenko (2.0% to 3.8%) following his decline in popularity with the Ukrainian public comes in at a distant sixth place behind leader of the Communist Party Petro Symonenko (3.4% to 4.5%) and Parliamentary speaker Volodymyr Lytvyn (1.4% to 5.8%).

A survey conducted by U.S.-based International Foundation for Electoral Systems and financed by the United States Agency for International Development (21–29 November) lists Viktor Yushchenko as the highest negativity rating (83%) and Viktor Yanukovych with the most positive rating (42%)

An opinion poll conducted by FOM-Ukraine in September/October 2009 expected the turnout to be at least 85.1%. The poll carried out by the Oleksandr Yaremenko Institute for Social Research in December 2009 predicted (at least) a 70% turnout.

2 January 2010 was the beginning of the 15-day media blackout on reporting of election polls before the 17 January first-round election.

=== First-round polls ===
Pollster	Date	Margin of error	Sample size	Yanukovych PoR	Tymoshenko YTB	Tihipko SU	Yatsenyuk FFC	Lytvyn LB	Yushchenko OU	Symonenko CPU	Bohoslovska Viche	Moroz SPU	Tyahnybok AUUF	Hrytsenko OU	Others	Against all	Will not vote	Not sure
2007
FOM-Ukraine	14–23 Dec 2007	±2.2pp	2,000	39.3	–	–	–	–	39.9	5.0	–	5.8	–	–	8.0	2.0	–	–
2008
FOM-Ukraine	25 Dec – 2 Jan 2008	–	–	24.4	19.8	–	–	–	12.7	–	–		–	–	–	7.9	7.2	15.1
Razumkov Centre	31 Dec – 5 Jan	–	–	20.0	24.8	–	–	3.1	13.1	3.7	–	0.8	–	–	–	6.1	8.0	18.1
USS	16 Apr – 4 May	–	2,010	27.0	26.0	–	–	6.0	8.0	–	–		–	–	–	–	–	33.0
SOCIS	30 Aug – 8 Sep	±2.2pp	2,040	25.1	26.0	–	2.6	4.9	6.5	4.3	–		0.9	0.4	1.3	7.9	11.0	8.1
ISPP	24–30 Nov	±2.0pp	2,000	20.7	17.9	–	4.6	3.8	3.9	5.0	–	0.5	0.9	–	0.4	41.5		
Razumkov Centre	17–24 Dec	±2.3pp	2,017	19.8	15.8	–	6.6	5.4	4.5	5.3	–	0.5	–	–	2.1	40.4		
2009
R&BG	1–9 Apr	±2.2pp	2,078	27.9	15.6	–	13.4	5.5	1.9	3.8	–	–	–	–	6.9	9.0	8.6	7.4
KMIS	3–12 Apr		1,984	25.6	14.4	–	13.6	2.9	2.4	3.3	–	–	–	–	–	11.1	9.4	13.6
FOM-Ukraine	13–25 Apr	±4.0pp	1,000	21.9	15.3	–	13.8	3.5	2.2	4.3	–	0.4	2.3	–	10.4		5.6	12.6
FOM-Ukraine	17–26 May	±4.0pp	1,000	26.6	16.2	–	12.8	2.9	1.9	3.4	–	–	–	–	–	36.2		
R&BG	12–22 Jun	±2.2pp	2,079	26.8	16.8	–	12.3	3.9	2.1	3.5	3.0	–	2.0	–	–	16.6	9.0	6.8
UPS	20–21 Jun	±2.0pp	2,511	24.0	12.8	–	5.7	8.7	2.9	3.5	–	<1	1.9	<1	–	40.5		
SOCIS	24 Jul – 4 Aug	±2.8pp	2,000	25.0	20.5	1.4	14.5	5.9	3.8	3.7	1.3	–	1.5	–	2.6	19.8		
R&BG	4–14 Aug	±2.2pp	3,011	26.0	16.5	–	12.6	4.2	2.0	4.5	–	–	–	–	7.3	9.9	6.6	10.4
SOCIS	20 Sep – 1 Oct	±1.5pp	5,009	28.7	19.0	2.6	8.2	2.8	2.8	3.6	0.8	–	1.0	0.7	0.2	9.4		20.3
FOM-Ukraine	26 Sep – 4 Oct	±4pp	1,000	26.8	15.6	1.6	9.3	1.4	2.2	4.0	–	–	–	–	–	15.2	6.7	6.7
R&BG	12–31 Oct	±2.2pp	3,118	31.0	18.4	3.6	9.6	2.3	3.5	3.5	–	–	–	–	3.0	6.8	6.8	9.0
R&BG	17–25 Nov	±2.2pp	3,108	32.4	16.3	4.4	6.1	4.5	3.5	3.8	–	–	–	–	1.6	7.5	4.3	15.9
KIIS	21–29 Nov	±2.5pp	1,502	31.2	19.1	4.8	4.7	2.8	3.5	3.8	0.7	–	1.8	0.7	2.4	7.9	5.0	11.6
FOM-Ukraine	22–30 Nov	±3.2pp	1,000	29.8	14.8	5.7	4.8	2.5	4.3	2.9	–	–	–	–	–	12.7	–	–
R&BG	5–13 Dec	±1.8pp	3,038	33.3	16.6	7.4	6.7	4.1	3.8	3.4	–	–	–	–	3.2	9.0	3.5	9.0

=== Runoff polls ===
Pollster	Date	Margin of error	Sample size	Yanukovych PoR	Tymoshenko YTB	Others	Against all	Will not vote	Not sure
2008
USS	16 Apr – 4 May		2,010	41.0	44.0	15.0			
SOCIS	30 Aug – 8 Sep	±2.2pp	2,040	34.6	32.7	0.9	32.7		
2009
R&BG	1–9 Apr	±2.2pp	2,078	38.4	29.3	–	19.0	8.2	5.0
R&BG	12–22 Jun	±2.2pp	2,079	38.8	28.8	–	16.6	9.0	6.8
SOCIS	24 Jul – 4 Aug	±2.8pp	2,000	26.1	24.4	49.5			
R&BG	4–14 Aug	±2.2pp	3,011	39.6	28.0	–	19.0	6.8	6.4
SOCIS	20 Sep – 1 Oct	±1.5pp	5,009	40.3	32.6	–	17	1.4	8.8
R&BG	12–31 Oct	±2.2pp	3,118	41.9	29.8	28.3			
R&BG	17–25 Nov	±2.2pp	3,108	47.4	28.1	–		4.5	7.5
KIIS	21–29 Nov	±2.5pp	1,502	42.0	28.0	18.0	12.0		
FOM-Ukraine	22–30 Nov	±3.2pp	1,000	41.0	25.2	20.7	13.1		
R&BG	5–13 Dec	±1.8pp	3,038	46.7	30.0	–	13.2	3.6	6.5

=== Exit polls ===
All exit polls conducted during the final round of voting reported a win for Viktor Yanukovych over Yulia Tymoshenko.

Polling agency	Viktor Yanukovych	Yulia Tymoshenko
National Exit Poll	48.7	45.5
TRK Ukraina	48.6	45.7
ICTV	49.8	45.2
SOCIS	49.6	44.5
FOM Center for Social and Marketing Research	49.7	44.6
Research & Branding group	50.2	44.0
Interfax-Ukraine	51.0	41.0

== Conduct ==
The election was widely recognized and endorsed as being fair and an accurate reflection of voters' intentions by all international agencies observing the election including the OSCE and PACE. According to all international organizations observing the election, allegations of electoral fraud in relation to the first-round ballot were unfounded; they declared that the conduct of the elections was within internationally recognized democratic standards and a testament to the will of the people of Ukraine.

A December 2009 poll found that 82 percent of Ukrainians expected vote rigging, those fears were shared by some election observers, both international and domestic. The latter also fearing the lack of an independent exit poll; which they see as essential to deterring vote fraud.

Yulia Tymoshenko, Ukraine's Prime-minister and one of the main candidates who sought election in the poll stated that: "We will not challenge any election returns to avoid tremors, which may bring about instability in this country. If the people elect their president, and this is not Yulia Tymoshenko, I will take this choice easy, for sure"

Former president Leonid Kuchma also excluded the possibility of a third-round ballot. According to Kuchma, "during the election campaign in 2004 the decision about holding the third round was political and it will not be repeated. The 2004 decision was an exclusion from a rule".

Viktor Baloha, former presidential secretary under Viktor Yushchenko stated:

"Alarming declarations about the likely vote rigging directly point to organizational weaknesses of some candidates as the law allows for reliable barriers against any electoral fraud. For instance, any presidential candidate can send his two representatives to sit on local and regional electoral commissions, appoint observers to keep an eye on voting and counting of ballots. Proxies of candidates who have wide authority can also supervise the course of the voting". "There are more than enough supervisory tools. Other effective barriers to electoral fraud are the Central Election Commission [whose members are appointed by major parliamentary parties on a quota principle] and numerous international observers. Mass media and NGOs, notably, the Committee of Voters of Ukraine, will also be effective in helping to curb fraud. Of great importance for establishing the final tally are also exit polls run by respected polling companies.they will all be used during the campaign." adding that "All the more so that there are 18 presidential candidates, some having considerable weight. That is why any declarations about the likely fraud are just attempts to justify a defeat of those who make them. Note that those candidates who are selling themselves as strong-willed and tough are most given to such declarations. In fact, such declarations expose them as would-be losers and outsiders"

Candidates Viktor Yanukovych and Yulia Tymoshenko both accused the other of intending to use vote rigging to win the election during the election campaign. Early January 2010 Ukrainian president Viktor Yushchenko warned that there is a real threat of "administrative pressure" being applied during the counting of votes at the presidential election. Viktor Yushchenko without providing any details has alleged that the highest threat of falsification in the first round will be applied by Yulia Tymoshenko Bloc; "because candidate Viktor Yanukovych will enter the second round in any case".

Allegations were made that Viktor Yushchenko had made a deal with Viktor Yanukovych in order to secure a number of political positions for members of his team in exchange for supporting Viktor Yanukovych's campaign Concern has been expressed that Viktor Yushchenko had tried to prevent news of the deal from being published by declaring it a State Secret.

A joint poll conducted by Democratic Initiatives and Ukrainian Sociology Service of January 2010 showed that less than 5% of the polled believed that the presidential election would be fair with 41.4% of respondents that believed that the election results could be manipulated and 15.7% being certain that the entire vote would be rigged. According to the same poll, 5.8% of those polled stated they were ready to sell their votes if the sum suited them and 1.9% of the respondents were ready to sell their votes for any presidential candidates and for any funds.

A voter casting more than one ballot, or selling their vote, could have faced as much as two years jail time.

The Ukrainian Central Election Commission and international observers found no evidence of significant electoral fraud and said that the voting and counting was fair.

=== International observers ===
The Ukrainian Foreign Ministry expected (in November 2009) that some 600 international observers would be monitoring the elections. The Organization for Security and Cooperation in Europe (OSCE) will send around 60 long-term and 600 short-term observers to Ukraine to monitor the presidential elections, Ukraine had submitted an invitation to the OSCE to monitor the elections. This electoral observation mission is headed by Portuguese politician João Soares, President of the OSCE Parliamentary Assembly. The OSCE/ODIHR long term observation mission was officially opened on 26 November 2009. On 12 January 2009, the OSCE where not satisfied with the level of funding for salaries and transport services.

The European Union member-states will send over 700 observers to monitor the elections. The Canada Ukraine Foundation (a Canadian NGO) and the Parliamentary Assembly of the Council of Europe (PACE) will also send observers. The PACE delegation is led by Hungarian politician Mátyás Eörsi. Late November the PACE delegation was sceptical the elections would meet the organization's standards. On 8 December 2009, Renate Wohlwend, co-rapporteur of PACE stated that PACE might continue to monitor Ukrainian politics after the country's presidential election. Wohlwend had also called on the Ukrainian parliament to amend a law on the presidential elections as soon as possible. Wohlwend expressed concern over the inclusion of a provision in Ukraine's electoral legislation giving the election commission the right to amend the electoral rolls on the day of the ballot. She expressed concern this could allow the rigging of the election results.

The Polish European Center of Geopolitical Analysis did send 20 observers to monitor signs of xenophobia during the presidential election campaign.

On 9 December 2009, candidate Viktor Yanukovych at a meeting with an OSCE election observation mission stated that he is afraid Prime Minister Yulia Tymoshenko might rig the presidential election.

A total of 450 official observers from the European Network of Election Monitoring Organizations (ENEMO) will monitor the elections.

Paweł Kowal lead the delegation of the European Parliament's observers; this delegation included ten people, who cooperated closely with the delegations of observers from the OSCE Parliamentary Assembly, the Council of Europe, the NATO Parliamentary Assembly, and the OSCE Office for Democratic Institutions and Human Rights (ODIHR).

A total of 3,149 international observers did monitor the 17 January presidential election in Ukraine.

On 18 January 2010, the OSCE announced it would send same number of observers to monitor Ukraine's second round of the election as in the first round. At the same time it called for bringing Ukraine's election laws in line with international norms but nevertheless it endorsed the first round of the Ukrainian presidential poll, saying it was of "high quality" and demonstrated "significant progress".

After the second round of the election international observers and the OSCE called the election transparent and honest.

According to Serhiy Paskhalov, the head of presidential candidate Yulia Tymoshenko's main campaign office in Dnipropetrovsk, international observers were physically unable to register mass irregularities in the second round of the presidential election. According to Paskhalov six foreign observers had monitored the run-off presidential election at 469 polling stations in six electoral districts in Dnipropetrovsk region.

== Results ==
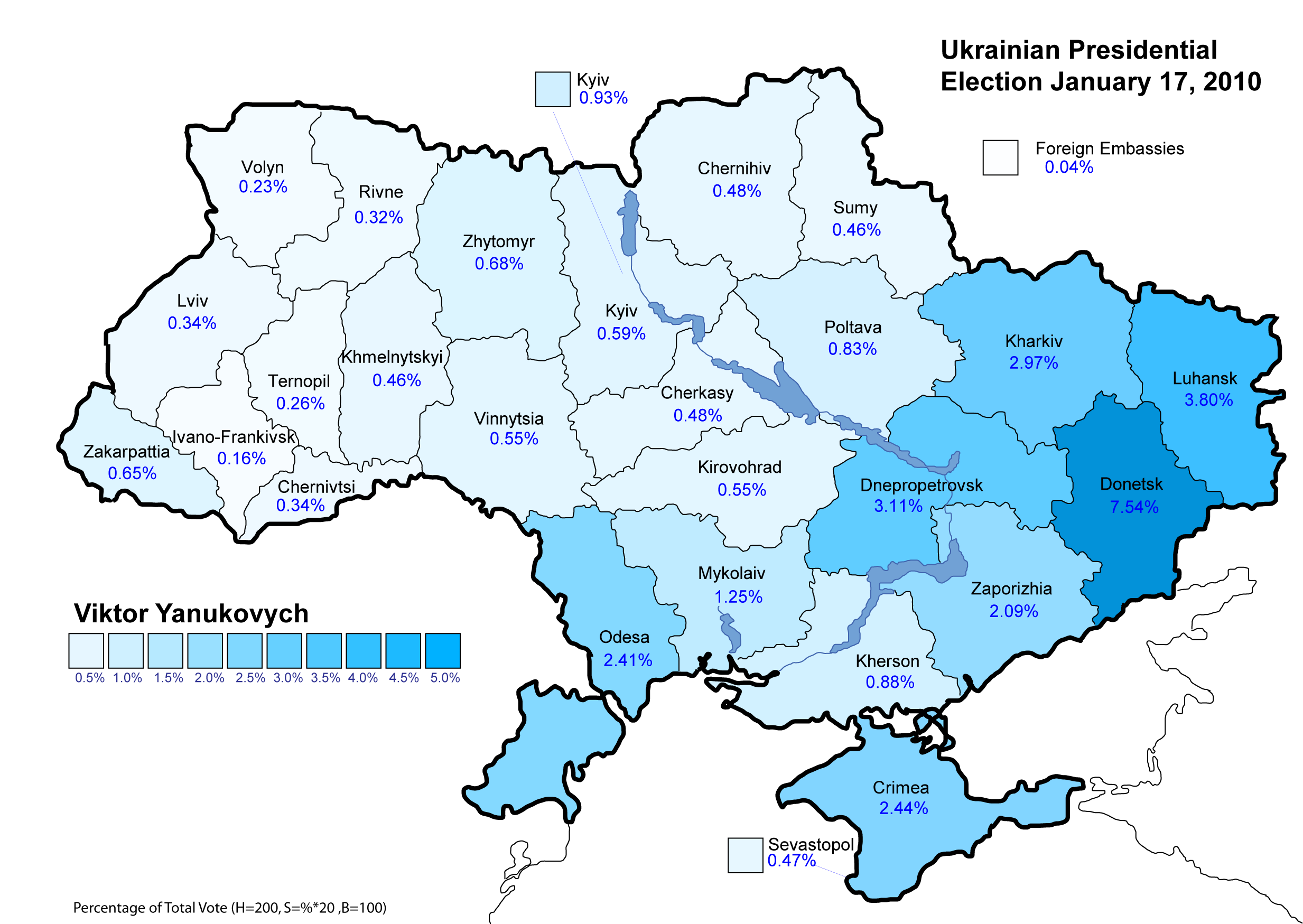
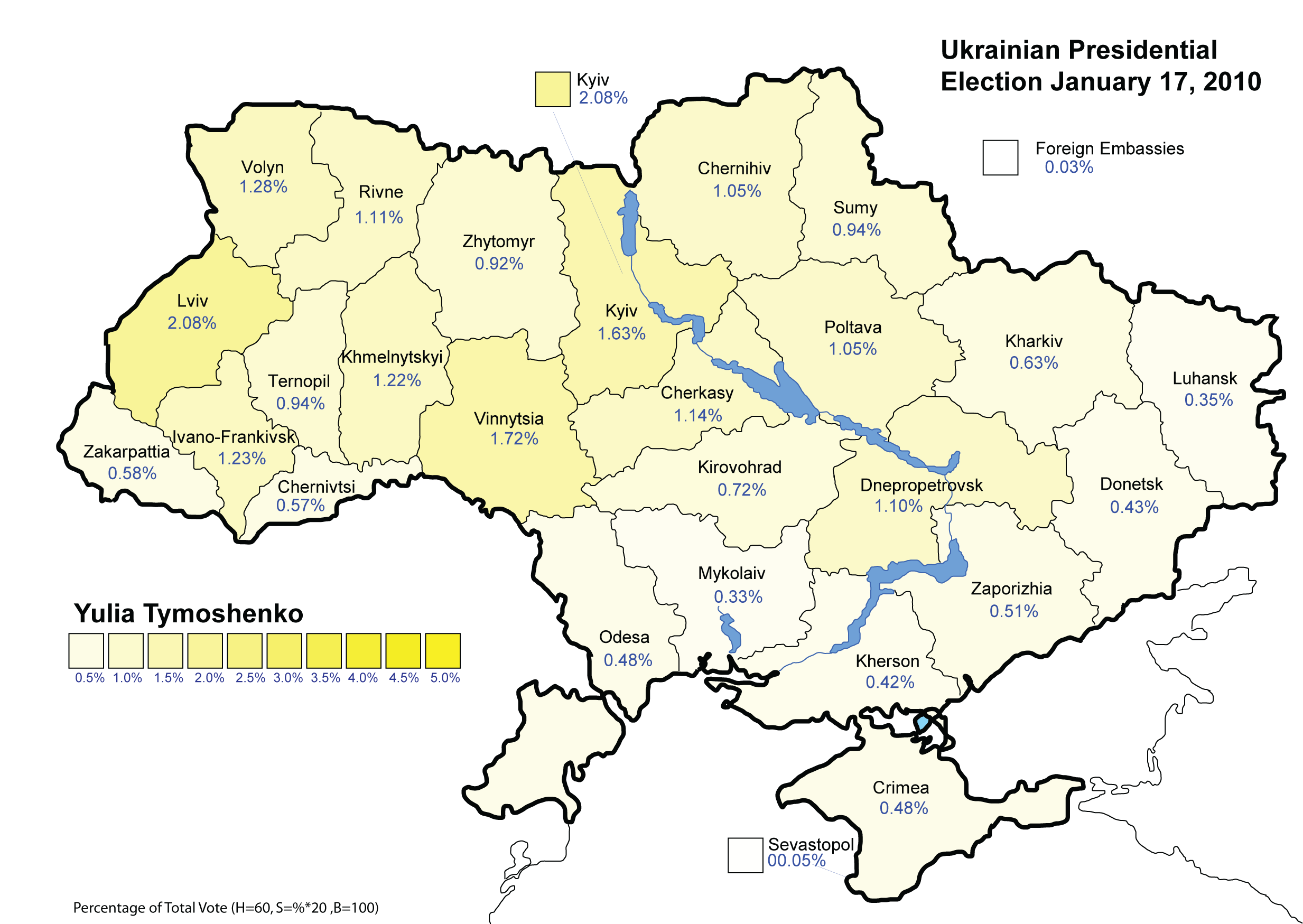
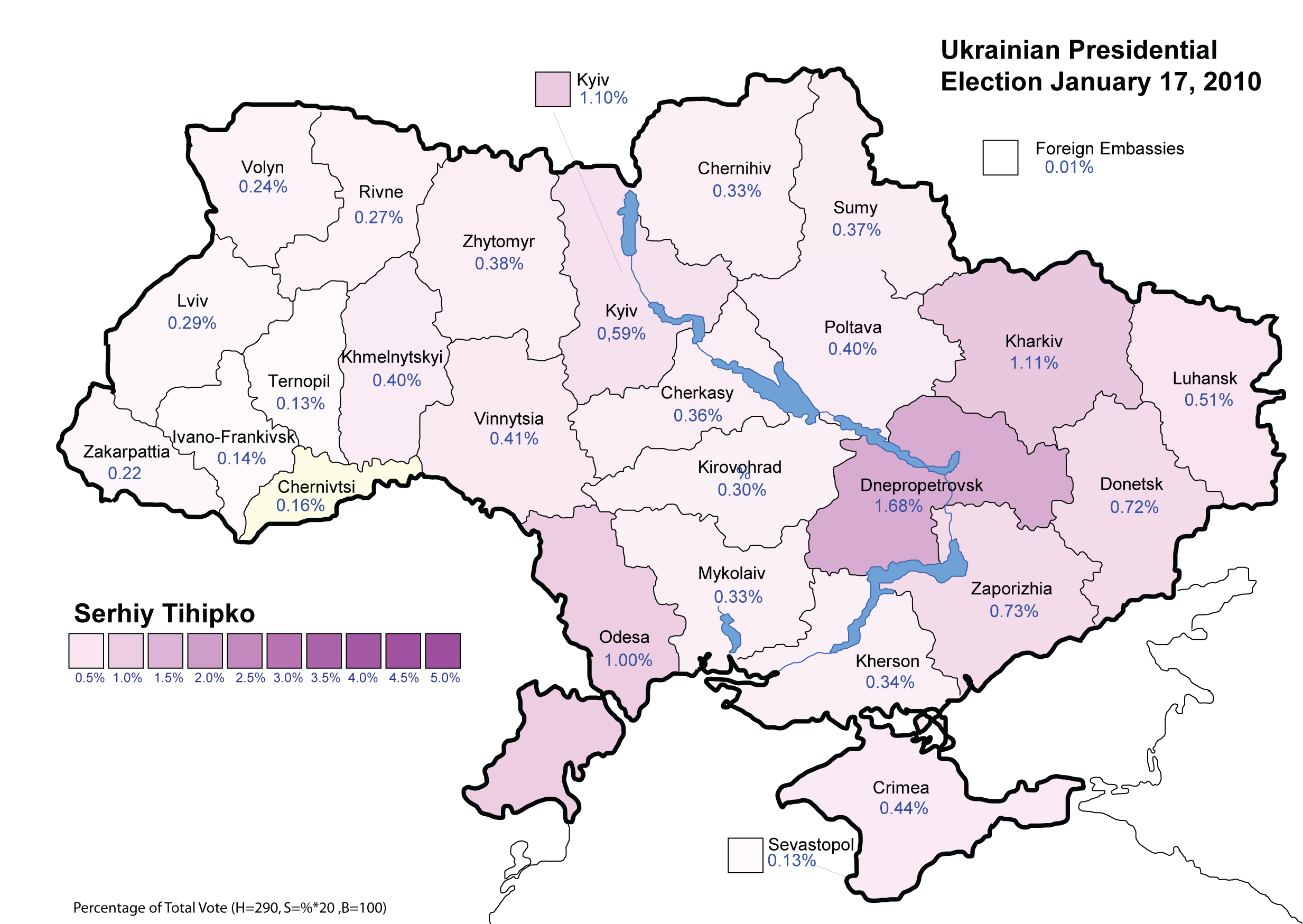
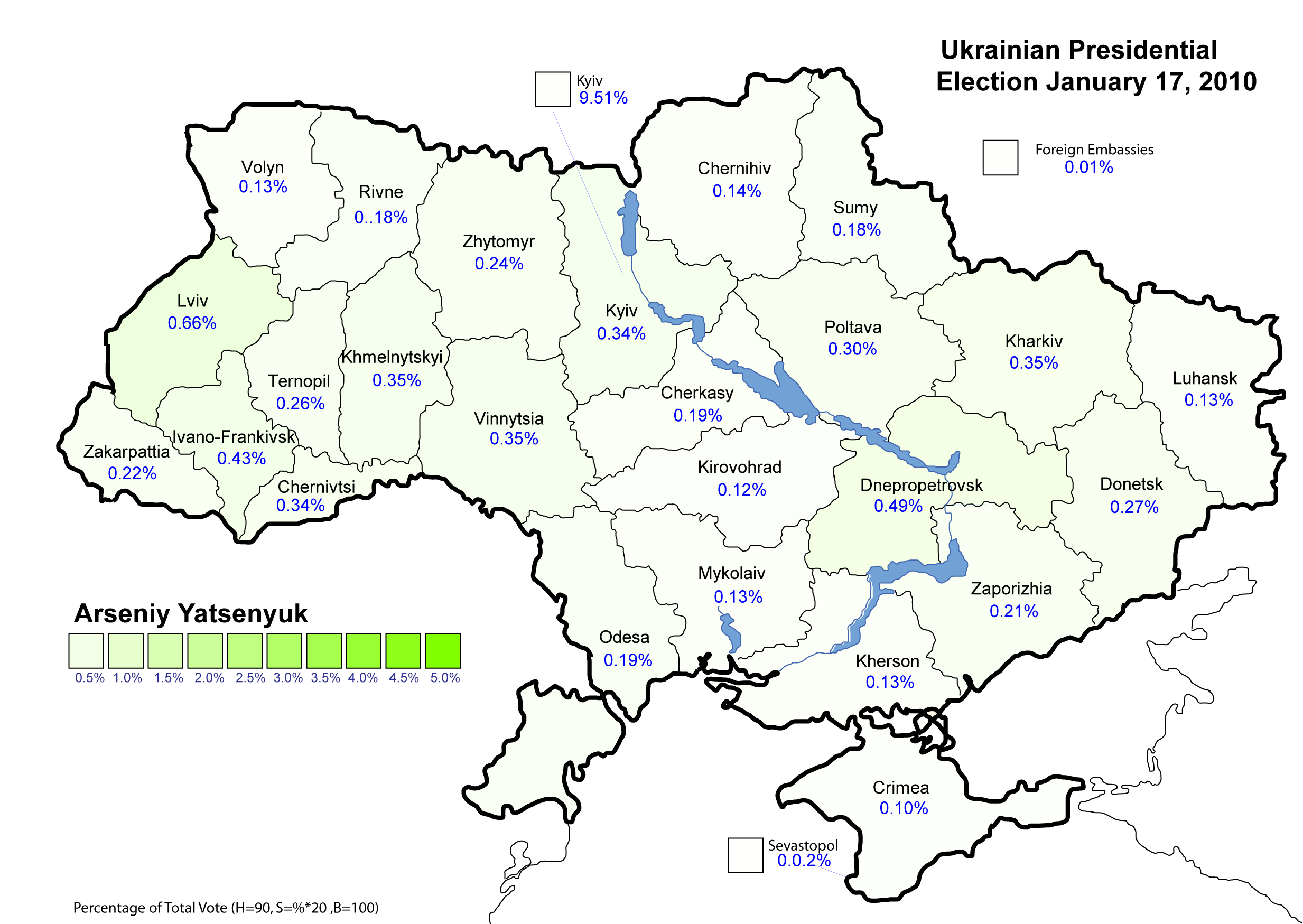
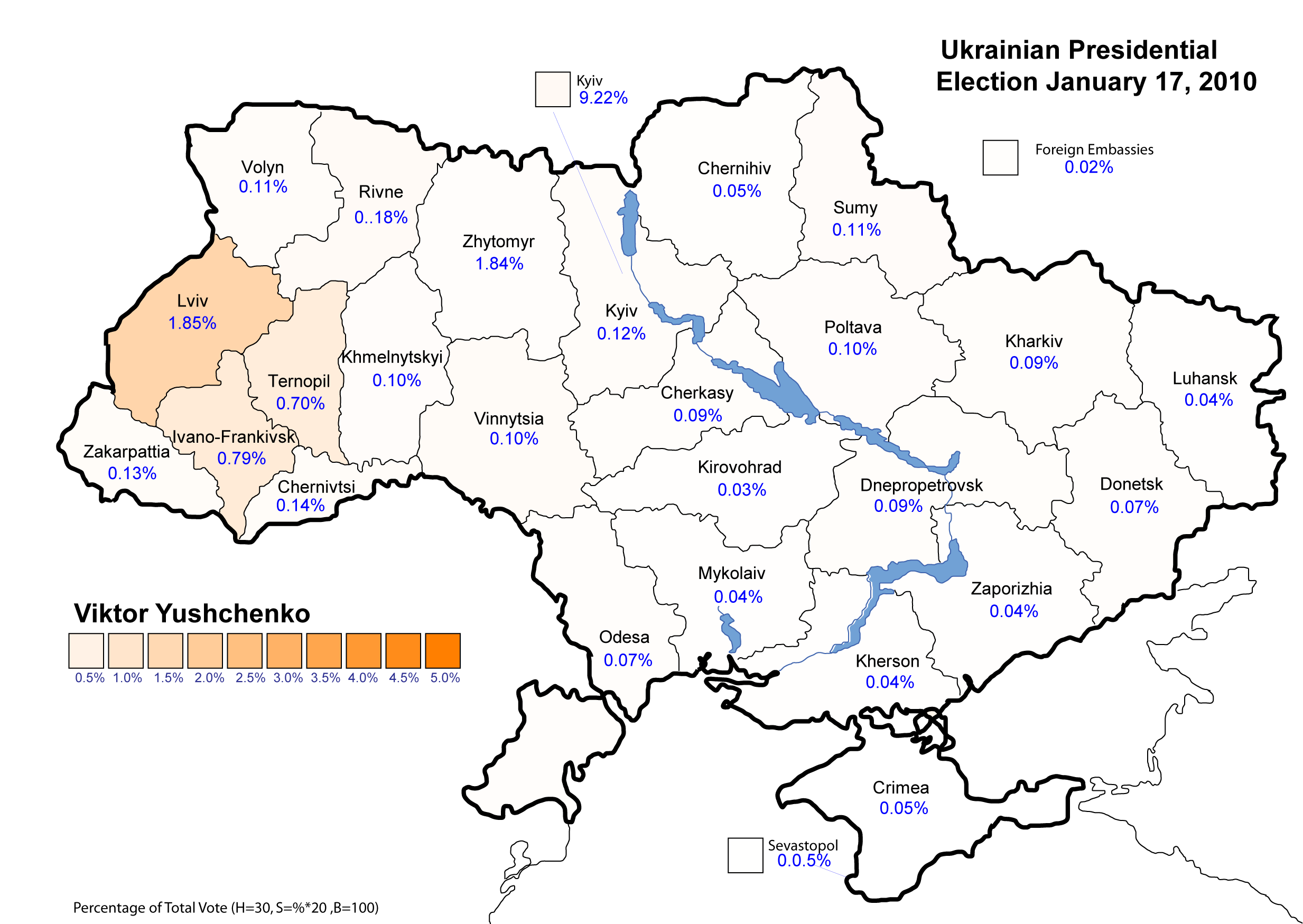
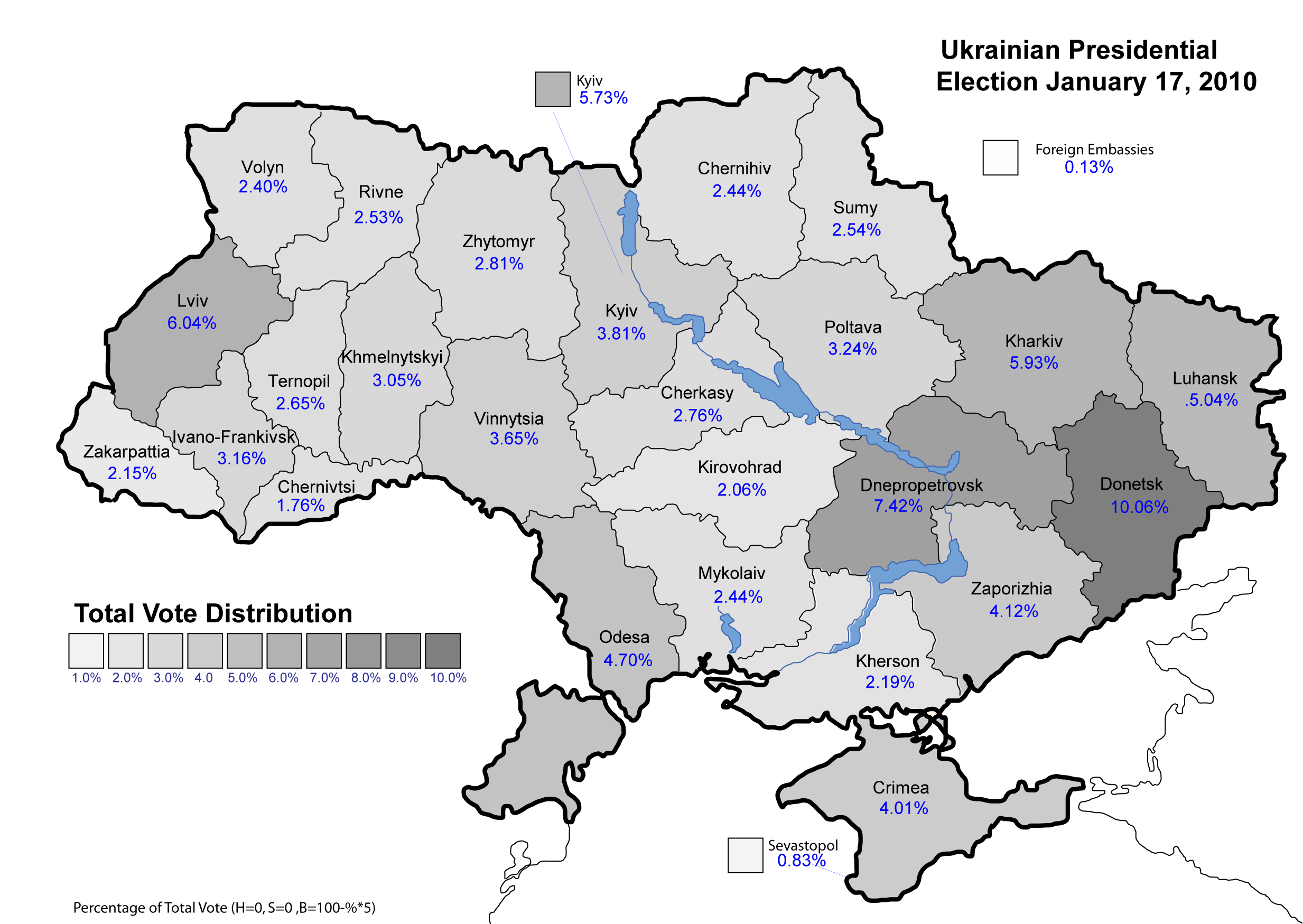
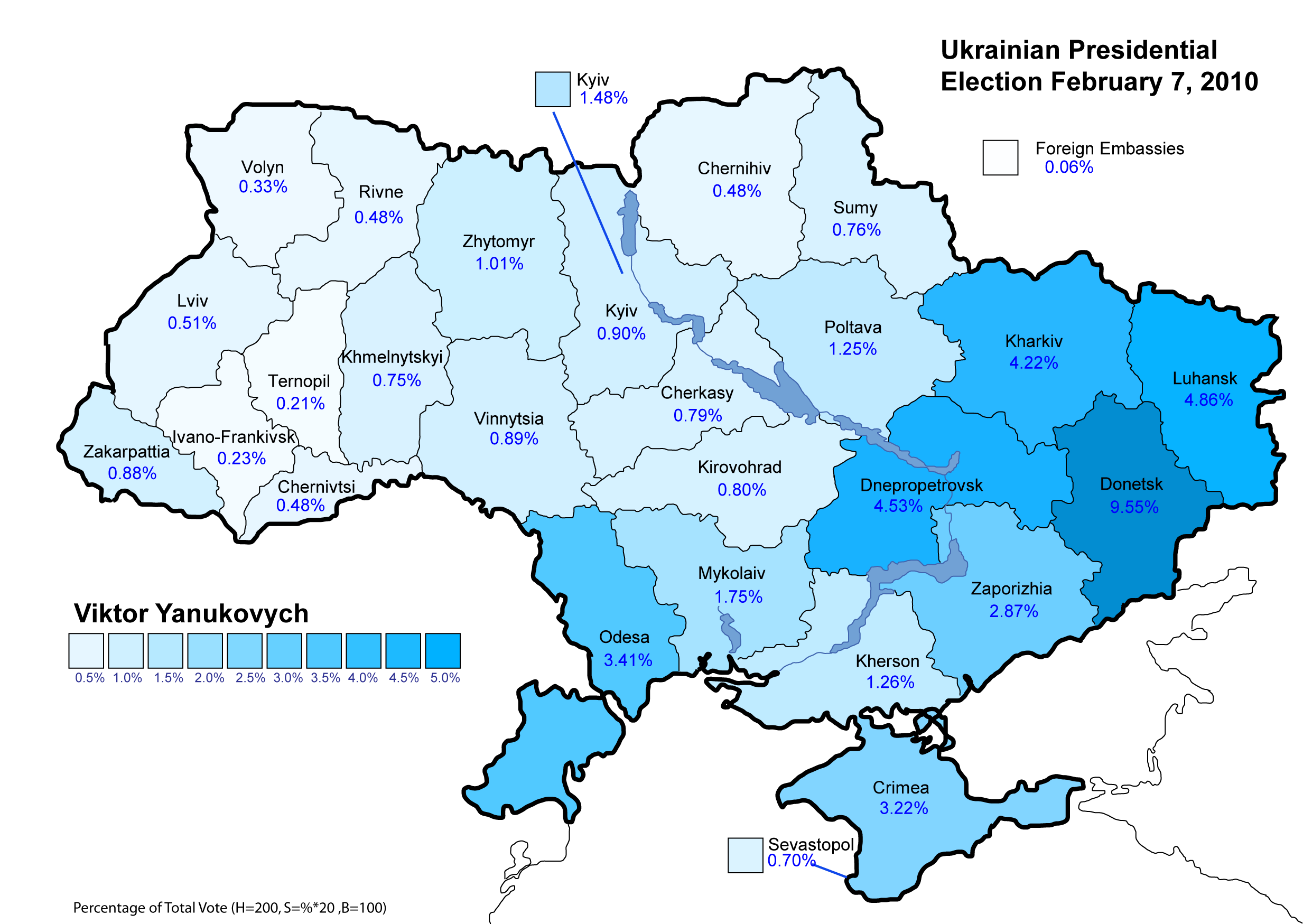
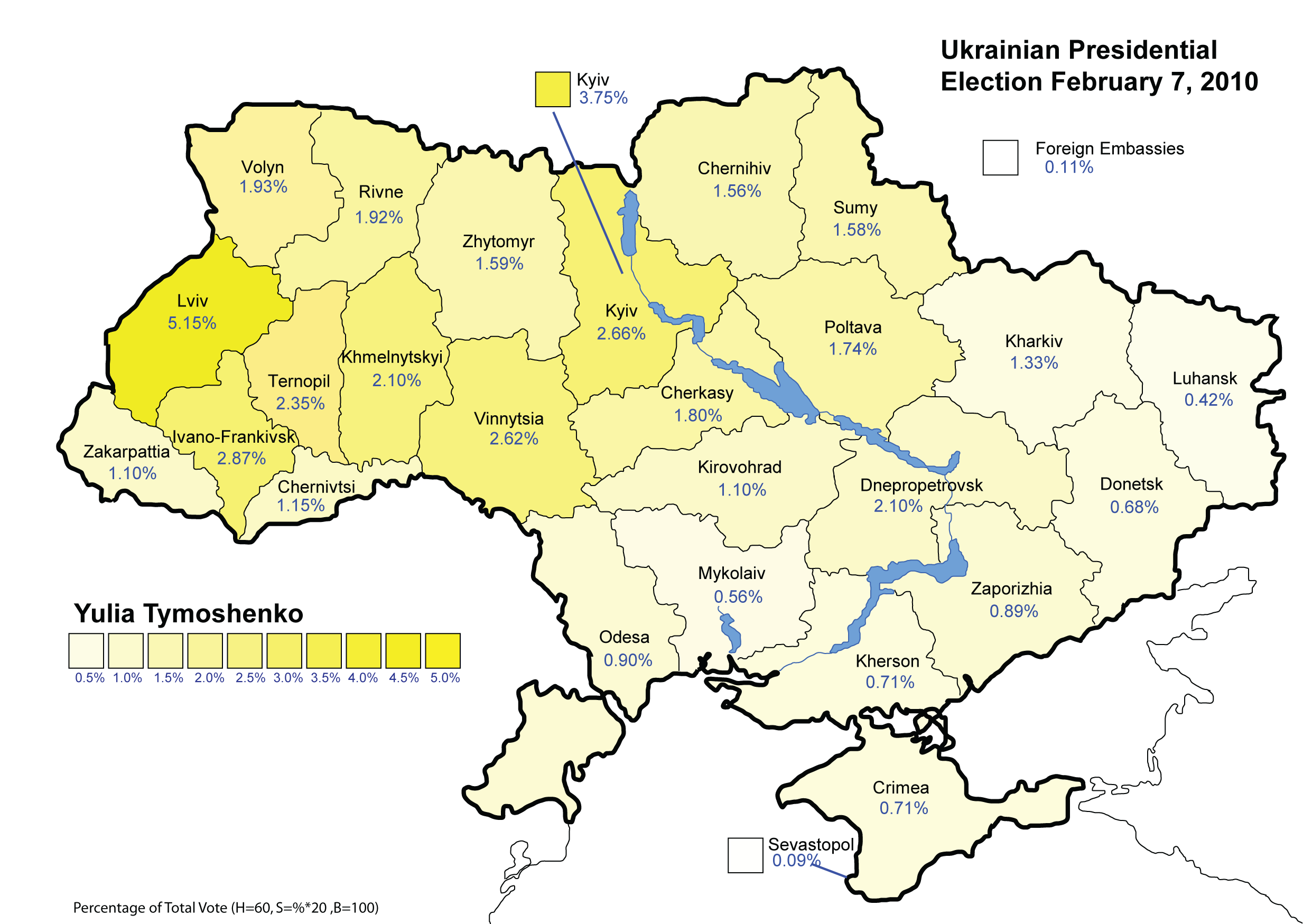

The first round of the election was held on 17 January 2010. Voter turnout was approximately 67 percent, compared to 75 percent at the 2004 presidential election. Early-vote returns from the first round of the election held on 17 January showed Yanukovych in first place with 36% of the vote. He faced a 7 February 2010 runoff against Tymoshenko, who finished second (with 25% of the vote). Incumbent president Viktor Yushchenko was defeated having received only 6% of the vote, finishing in fifth place behind Serhiy Tihipko and Arseniy Yatsenyuk who had each respectively received 13% and 7% of the vote.

Peter Simonenko, Volodymyr Lytvyn, Oleh Tyahnybok and Anatoliy Hrytsenko all scored between 4 and 1% of the votes. The remaining nine candidates for the presidency gained less than 1% of the votes.

Analysts predicted that both candidates had a chance to win the second round. Yanukovych refused to hold debates with his opponent before the second round of voting, saying Tymoshenko should either take responsibility for every word as prime minister, or go to the kitchen. After all ballots were counted, the Ukrainian Central Election Commission declared that Yanukovych won the election with 48.95% of the vote compared with 45.47% for Tymoshenko. Yulia Tymoshenko Bloc members immediately claimed that there was systematic and large-scale vote rigging in this run-off.

The second round of voting between Viktor Yanukovych and Yulia Tymoshenko took place on 7 February 2010. Exit polls indicated that Yanukovych had been elected, with the National Election Poll placing him first at 49% of the vote to Tymoshenko's 46%. With 100% of the ballots counted, the tally was 12,481,268 votes for Yanukovych and 11,593,340 for Tymoshenko. There were 1.19% invalid votes and 4.36% of voters chose to vote "Against all" (candidates). In Kyiv, the number of voter choosing "Against all" was close to 8%.

Candidate	Party	First round		Second round	
Candidate	Party	Votes	%	Votes	%
Viktor Yanukovych	Party of Regions	8,686,642	35.92	12,481,266	49.55
Yulia Tymoshenko	Batkivshchyna	6,159,810	25.47	11,593,357	46.03
Serhiy Tihipko	Strong Ukraine	3,211,198	13.28		
Arseniy Yatsenyuk	Independent	1,711,737	7.08		
Viktor Yushchenko	Independent	1,341,534	5.55		
Petro Symonenko	Communist Party of Ukraine	872,877	3.61		
Volodymyr Lytvyn	People's Party	578,883	2.39		
Oleh Tyahnybok	Svoboda	352,282	1.46		
Anatoliy Hrytsenko	Independent	296,412	1.23		
Inna Bohoslovska	Independent	102,435	0.42		
Oleksandr Moroz	Socialist Party of Ukraine	95,169	0.39		
Yuriy Kostenko	Ukrainian People's Party	54,376	0.22		
Liudmyla Suprun	People's Democratic Party	47,349	0.20		
Vasyl Protyvsikh	Independent	40,352	0.17		
Oleksandr Pabat	Independent	35,474	0.15		
Serhiy Ratushniak	Independent	29,795	0.12		
Mykhailo Brodskyy	Independent	14,991	0.06		
Oleg Riabokon	Independent	8,334	0.03		
Against all		542,819	2.24	1,113,055	4.42
Total		24,182,469	100.00	25,187,678	100.00
Valid votes		24,182,469	98.35	25,187,678	98.80
Invalid/blank votes		405,765	1.65	305,837	1.20
Total votes		24,588,234	100.00	25,493,515	100.00
Registered voters/turnout		36,968,041	66.51	37,051,449	68.81
Source: CEC

=== Second round results by oblast ===
Oblast	Yanukovych		Tymoshenko		Against all		Invalid		Total votes
Oblast	Votes	%	Votes	%	Votes	%	Votes	%	Total votes
Autonomous Republic of Crimea	821,244	79.20	181,715	17.52	34,005	3.28	12,627	1.20	1,049,591
Cherkasy	202,512	29.22	459,041	66.24	31,486	4.54	9,105	1.30	702,144
Chernihiv	194,069	31.33	398,953	64.40	26,471	4.27	7,492	1.19	626,985
Chernivitsi	121,381	28.14	291,944	67.67	18,080	4.19	7,744	1.76	439,149
City of Sevastopol	178,201	85.12	21,940	10.48	9,201	4.40	1,916	0.91	211,258
Dnipropetrovsk	1,154,274	63.60	536,321	29.55	124,269	6.85	25,816	1.40	1,840,680
Donetsk	2,435,522	91.21	173,820	6.51	60,905	2.28	22,566	0.84	2,692,813
Ivano-Frankivsk	57,849	7.11	731,858	90.01	23,385	2.88	10,200	1.24	823,292
Kharkiv	1,076,962	72.14	338,643	22.68	77,293	5.18	16,347	1.08	1,509,245
Kherson	323,201	60.74	181,754	34.16	27,157	5.10	6,687	1.24	538,799
Khmelnytskyi	191,484	25.32	535,371	70.78	29,494	3.90	11,297	1.47	767,646
Kirovohrad	203,999	40.12	281,509	55.36	23,014	4.53	6,424	1.25	514,946
Kyiv City	376,099	25.95	955,406	65.92	117,814	8.13	12,751	0.87	1,462,070
Kyiv Oblast	229,858	23.99	678,533	70.82	49,686	5.19	15,184	1.56	973,261
Luhansk	1,237,922	89.83	107,523	7.80	32,623	2.37	13,367	0.96	1,391,435
Lviv	131,136	8.69	1,313,904	87.10	63,518	4.21	15,686	1.03	1,524,244
Mykolaiv	446,050	72.41	143,135	23.24	26,836	4.36	7,549	1.21	623,570
Odesa	868,533	75.44	228,757	19.87	54,016	4.69	20,039	1.71	1,171,345
Poltava	318,405	39.41	442,583	54.78	46,955	5.81	8,591	1.05	816,534
Rivne	121,446	19.14	489,579	77.16	23,471	3.70	7,585	1.18	642,081
Sumy	194,608	30.82	402,591	63.76	34,181	5.41	8,721	1.36	640,101
Ternopil	53,773	7.99	599,697	89.15	19,216	2.86	5,717	0.84	678,403
Vinnytsia	227,633	24.58	667,101	72.04	31,217	3.37	12,281	1.31	938,232
Volyn	84,212	14.16	491,854	82.70	18,689	3.14	6,098	1.01	600,853
Zakarpattia	224,917	42.54	279,631	52.89	24,171	4.57	12,526	2.31	541,245
Zaporizhzhia	731,932	72.37	227,531	22.50	51,918	5.13	12,243	1.20	1,023,624
Zhytomyr	258,695	37.17	405,289	58.24	31,928	4.59	8,864	1.26	704,776
Overseas	15,349	34.28	27,374	61.13	2,056	4.59	414	0.92	45,193
Total	12,481,266	49.55	11,593,357	46.03	1,113,055	4.42	305,837	1.20	25,493,515
Source: CEC, CEC

== Analysis ==
Voting analysis showed that during the election creases started to emerge across the traditional geographical voters patterns. Tymoshenko made inroads in Yanukovych's traditional east and south Ukraine base of support, whereas Yanukovych did the same in Tymoshenko's traditional west and central Ukraine base of support. More women voted for Yanukovych than for Tymoshenko.

== Reactions ==
A few days after the election, Yanukovich received congratulations from the leaders of Armenia, Austria, Azerbaijan, Belarus, Bulgaria, China, Egypt, Estonia, Finland, France, Georgia, Germany, Greece, Hungary, Israel, Italy, Kazakhstan, Latvia, Libya, Lithuania, Moldova, the Netherlands, Paraguay, Poland, Portugal, Russia, Slovakia, Slovenia, Spain, Sweden, Tajikistan, Turkey, the United Kingdom, the United States, Uzbekistan, NATO and the European Union. Still, Tymoshenko refused to concede defeat, and Tymoshenko's party promised to challenge the result. On 17 February 2010, the Administrative Court of Ukraine, suspended the results of the election on Yulia Tymoshenko's appeal. The court suspended the Central Election Commission of Ukraine ruling that announced that Viktor Yanukovych won the election. Tymoshenko withdrew her appeal on 20 February 2010, after the Higher Administrative Court in Kyiv rejected her petition to scrutinize documents from election districts in Crimea and also to question election and law-enforcement officials. The same day (20 February) Tymoshenko announced that she will not challenge the results of the second round of the presidential election in the Supreme Court of Ukraine since she believed there were no legal provisions for such an appeal, although Tymoshenko also stated "an honest court will assess that Yanukovych wasn't elected President of Ukraine, and that the will of the people had been rigged".

== Aftermath ==
Tymoshenko's party said that it would challenge the result in 1,000 of the country's 30,000 ballot boxes (as many as 900,000 ballots – enough to make a difference in the outcome), claiming that the counting process was unfair. Violations cited by Tymoshenko's camp included home voting and the busing of voters to polling stations, which was explicitly permitted by law. Yanukovich's party activists rallied outside the buildings of the Higher Administrative Court of Ukraine and the Kyiv Administrative Court of Appeals the days after the second round of the election.

On 10 February 2010, Yanukovych called on Tymoshenko to abandon her protests and resign as prime minister. On 9 February 2010, Yanukovych had stated that Borys Kolesnykov was his preferred next Prime Minister of Ukraine. According to him pre-term parliamentary elections will be imminent if the Ukrainian parliament would not work effectively. Yanukovych also stated that, as the largest faction in the parliament at the time, his party was entitled to nominate the premier. On 15 February, Yanukovych stated "I do not rule out the candidature of Tigipko (as next Prime Minister). Tigipko is on the list which, in my opinion, will be discussed next week in parliament".

On 16 February 2010 Ukraine's parliament had fixed 25 February 2010 for the inauguration of Yanukovych as president. On 17 February 2010, "the Higher Administrative Court of Ukraine", suspended the results of the election on Yulia Tymoshenko's appeal.

On 20 February 2010, Tymoshenko withdrew her appeal after "the Higher Administrative Court of Ukraine" rejected her petition to scrutinize documents:
— about 300,000 voters who voted but were not in the "Register of Voters of Ukraine";
— about 1.3 million voters who "without right" voted in their homes;
— about falsification in the election in the eastern regions (Donetsk, Luhansk, Kharkiv region, Crimea, etc.) — fixed by law-enforcement officials.
Tymoshenko stated, "I and my political party will never recognize Yanukovych as the legitimately elected president of Ukraine", and "an honest court will assess that Yanukovych was not elected President of Ukraine, and that the will of the people had been rigged".
