= Kyiv Public Asset =

Kyiv Public Asset Громадський актив Києва
- Abbreviation: HAK
- Leader: Oleksandr Pabat
- Founded: 2005
- Headquarters: Kyiv
- Ideology: Kyiv localism Civic nationalism
- Political position: Centre
- Colours: Orange

Website
- http://www.gak.kiev.ua/

Kyiv Public Asset (Ukrainian: Громадський актив Києва, Hromadskyi aktyv Kyieva, HAK) was first a local political party, later an electoral bloc, in Kyiv, led by Oleksandr Pabat. HAK was created from a homonymous civic organisation, whose main goal was to "teach people of their rights and control of local officials".

== History ==
The coalition was founded by Oleksandr Pabat in 2005 as a non-governmental civic activist organization. During the 2008 local election the party won 5.95% of the votes and 8 seats in the Kyiv City Council. One candidate was removed from the election list in relation the possible involvement in the washing of "dirty money".

Faction leader Oleksandr Pabat is a self-nominated candidate in the 2010 Ukrainian presidential election. In 2009, Pabat initiated the People's Salvation Army.

In the 2014 Kyiv local election the party did not win any seats.

=== 2008 Kyiv local election ===
In the 2008 local election Kyiv Public Asset had the following composition:

- Liberal Democratic Party of Ukraine
- People's Party of depositors and social security
- Party of Law Defense
