= 2009 swine flu pandemic in Ukraine =

The 2009 swine flu pandemic was a global outbreak of a new strain of influenza A virus subtype H1N1, first identified in April 2009, termed Pandemic H1N1/09 virus by the World Health Organization (WHO) and colloquially called swine flu. The outbreak was first observed in Mexico, and quickly spread globally. On the 11th of June 2009, the WHO declared the outbreak to be a pandemic. The overwhelming majority of patients experience mild symptoms, but some persons are at higher risk of suffering more serious effects; such as those with asthma, diabetes, obesity, heart disease, or those who are pregnant or have a weakened immune system. In the rare severe cases, around 3–5 days after symptoms manifest, the sufferer's condition declines quickly, often to the point respiratory failure. Although Ukraine was not (very) affected at first there was on outbreak of the virus in Western Ukraine in early November 2009 that led to the closing of public buildings and cancellation of meetings for three weeks.

As of December 2009 more than two million people had fallen ill since Ukraine's flu epidemic began and about 500 of those people died of flu or flu-like illnesses and its complications (pneumonia) of the 46 million people then living in Ukraine. Ukraine was one of the countries most affected (8th) by swine flu in Europe.

According to Ukrainian Justice Minister Mykola Onischuk the epidemiological situation during October–December 2009 didn't change the overall death rate in Ukraine.

Ukraine has two laboratories capable of identifying influenza strains.

== Timeline ==
=== First cases ===
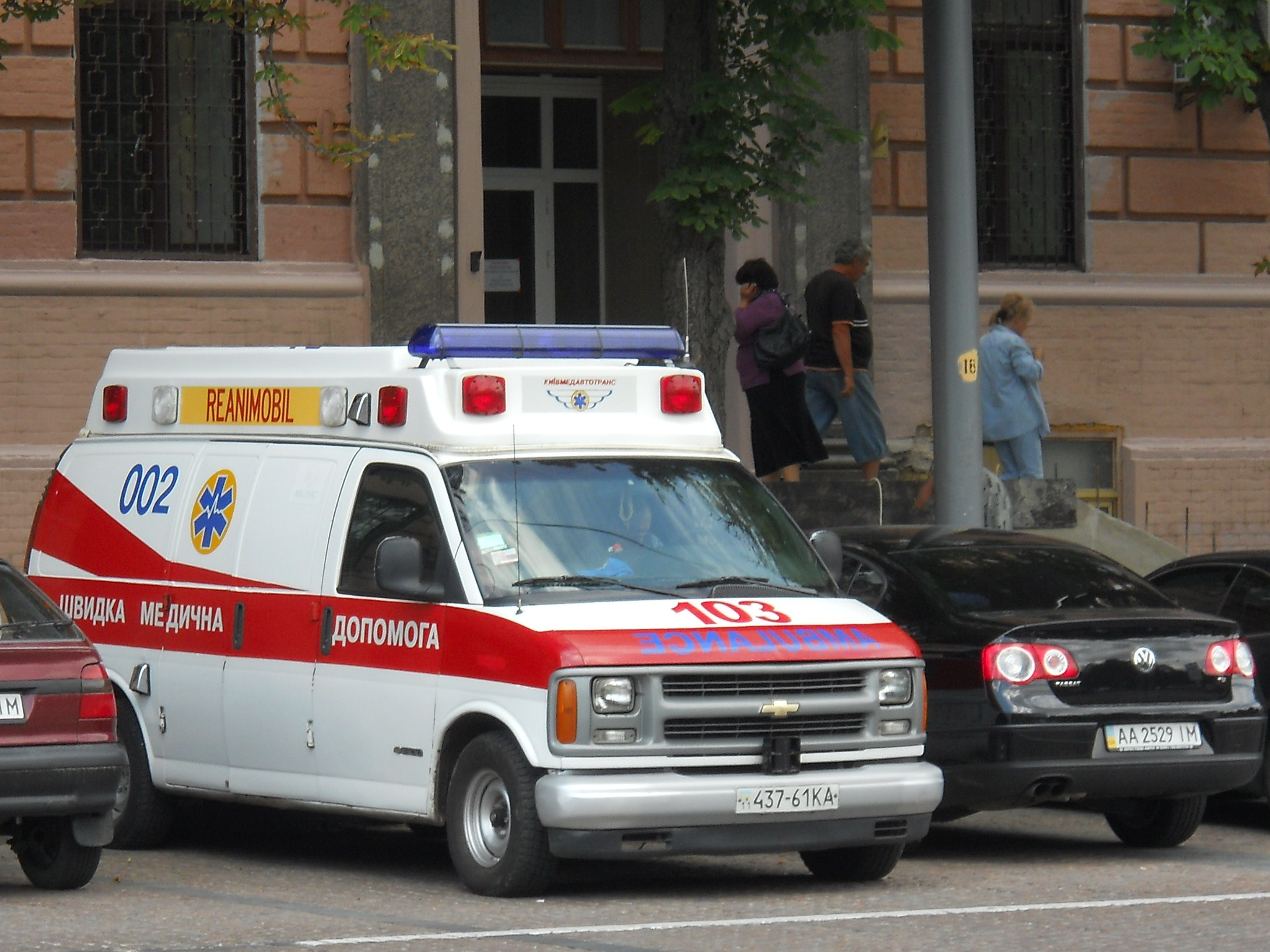
An ambulance in Kyiv

The virus reached Ukraine on 5 June 2009 when the first case of the virus was officially confirmed in Ukraine. The patient concerned, a 24-year-old Ukrainian citizen, had arrived from New York City via Paris at Kyiv's Boryspil Airport on May 29, 2009. Before that imports of pork and live pigs from all affected countries had been banned. The ban applied to all shipments after April 21, 2009.

A second swine flu case (in Ukraine) was confirmed on September 29, 2009.

=== Flu epidemic ===
==== October 2009 ====
On October 27, 2009, an outbreak of influenza-like illness and the deaths of seven people from its complications were reported in Ternopil region. Schools and universities in Ternopil were closed.

Radio Netherlands Worldwide mentioned (on November 4) that rumors had spread about a plane said to have been flown over the capital of Ukraine, Kyiv, releasing powder containing a mutated variety of the A (H1N1) virus.

On 30 October 2009, Ukrainian Ministry of Health confirmed 11 new cases of swine flu and the first death from it. An epidemic was declared and nine out of 25 regions of Ukraine were put under quarantine, on November 5, 2009 Kirovohrad became the 10th. Due to the outbreak public meetings, including cinema, were forbidden nationwide and all educational institutions were closed for three weeks (subject to extension if necessary). Conscription into the Ukrainian army was also suspended,

and the Professional Football League of Ukraine postponed football matches in the Ukrainian First League and Second League.[28]

==== November 2009 ====
A large shipment of Tamiflu was delivered from Switzerland to Ukraine on November 1, 2009, for distribution among hospitals for free.

On November 2, 2009, at Ukraine's request, the WHO sent a team of nine experts to determine if the same strain of swine flu was responsible for the 70 recent deaths from acute respiratory illness in the country.

According to the Ukrainian Health Ministry, by November 2, 2009, the number of people who had died of influenza and respiratory diseases had reached 60, the number of people suffering from the flu was 200,000 and about 22 patients had tested positive for swine flu. On November 5, 2009, the Ministry said the death toll of patients with flu-related and acute respiratory illnesses had jumped to 95. 15 of 31 patient samples sent to London for laboratory analysis tested positive for the H1N1 virus.

By November 6, 2009, twenty-eight cases of swine flu had been confirmed in Ukraine. Thirteen of these cases were in people who had died by that point. The Ukrainian health ministry estimated that Ukraine required 12.5 million doses of a vaccine against swine flu. Four days later, on November 10, 2009, the number of confirmed cases had risen to 67. However, only one more person had died. 1,031,587 people in Ukraine had contracted flu or a flu-like illness by then and of them 52,742 where hospitalized at the time of the report. Since there had been 174 additional deaths from acute respiratory viral infections and other patients had recovered, though this number is less than the total hospitalizations related to flu and flu-like illnesses.

At this point, a policy was implemented that stated that if at least one person had been diagnosed with swine flu in any region of Ukraine, then everyone in that region diagnosed with the flu would receive swine flu treatment.

On November 17, 2009, the WHO issued a statement that there were no significant differences between the pandemic H1N1 strain and the Ukrainian strains tested.

Starting on November 18, 2009, the Ukrainian ministry of health stopped publishing separate statistics on cases of A/H1N1 influenza. Regional commissions were given the power to cancel quarantines of higher educational establishments on November 20.

On November 23 educational institutions opened again in regions below the epidemic threshold for flu and respiratory infections; for instance on November 25, 2009, all educational institutions and kindergartens in Kyiv resumed work.

==== December 2009 ====
As of December 2, 2009, 445 people had died of flu and flu-like illnesses with a total of 116,982 people hospitalized since the start of the epidemic (October 29, 2009). Of those hospitalized, 93,213 people had at the time been discharged from hospitals. On December 2 the epidemic threshold was still exceeded in the Zakarpattia and Khmelnytsky regions.

By December 7, 2009, more than two million people had fallen ill since Ukraine's flu epidemic began, with 88 patients in intensive care at the time. At the time about 46 million people lived in Ukraine.

By December 8, 2009, 468 people had died of flu and flu-like illnesses and its complications (pneumonia) in Ukraine with a total of 128,851 people that had been hospitalized since the start of the epidemic (October 29) and 102,510 people discharged from hospitals. On December 8 the epidemic threshold was still exceeded in Vinnytsia, Dnipropetrovsk, Kirovohrad, Luhansk and Sumy regions.

In December 2009, Ukrainian and World Health Organization officials warned of a second and third wave of the flu epidemic starting in late December 2009 and early 2010. On December 23, the WHO said that H1N1 was resurgent in Ukraine, as well as in Serbia and Turkey, with increasing influenza-like illness and acute respiratory illness.

As of December 28, 652 people had died since the epidemic started in late October. At the time 258 people were in intensive care with dozens on ventilators. More than 200,000 people have been hospitalized. Late December 2009 saw high influenza activity in the Eastern Ukrainian provinces Donetsk Oblast and Luhansk Oblast.

The spread of acute respiratory infections in Ukraine passed over a second peak in late December 2009, with case counts almost three times those from the same time in the prior year.

==== January 2010 ====
On January 8 the WHO said that intense A/H1N1 virus activity continued in Ukraine, as well as in several other eastern Europe countries. On January 23, Ukrainian health officials reported that they expected a second surge of flu and respiratory infections to strike early in February 2010.

The number of those who had died of flu and flu-like illnesses in Ukraine increased to 940 people on January 12, 2010, with the epidemic threshold exceeded in Dnipropetrovsk, Luhansk, Poltava, Sumy regions and Crimea; according to the Ukrainian Health Ministry. This number increased to 1,019 people on January 21, 2010, with the epidemic threshold exceeded in the Dnipropetrovsk, Luhansk, Poltava and Sumy regions.

== Epidemiology ==
According to Chief State Sanitary Doctor Oleksandr Bilovol, the mass refusal by Ukrainians to be vaccinated (after several persons allegedly died after vaccinations in 2008 and 2009) was partly the cause for the epidemic.

According to Ukrainian doctors the Government of Ukraine had provided no public information and taken no precautionary measures to prevent the pandemic. In November, the WHO praised the Ukrainian government for the measures it took to prevent the spread of the flu epidemic in Ukraine. According to a poll carried out by the Institute of Social and Political Psychology of the Academy of Pedagogical Sciences of Ukraine in November 2009 Ukrainian citizens had mainly negative feelings about measures being taken by the government to fight the flu epidemic. According to the poll, 49.8% of respondents made a negative assessment of the activities of the Cabinet of Ministers (37.4% a positive one), 44.8% the Health Ministry (28.1% positive), 57.4% the president and his secretariat (18.8% positive), and 50.4% the Verkhovna Rada (parliament of Ukraine) (18.6% positive).

Ukrainian analysts have suggested that politicians, mainly Ukrainian President Viktor Yushchenko and Prime Minister Yulia Tymoshenko, have tried to use the pandemic to score political points with the January 2010 presidential election in mind. This was denied by Prime Minister Tymoshenko. According to a poll by Research & Branding Group the majority of Ukrainians thought that the epidemic of flu would not affect the presidential elections. According to a November 2009 poll by FOM-Ukraine 33.3% of Ukrainians think that the public panic about the flu epidemic helped Prime Minister Tymoshenko the most, while 28.7% said it was a boost for all politicians (other individual politicians where polled at <10%). Asked what caused the panic, 45.6% pointed to the media and 20.3% to government representatives.

According to the Ukrainian Health Ministry the average daily number of fatalities caused by flu in 2009 was lower than in 2008, when it was 18.

During the pandemic Ukrainians started to eat onions and garlic (in Lviv, the price of garlic had skyrocketed in November 2009), took vitamins, spent more time at home or drank alcoholic beverages in order to protect themselves from flu and flu-like illnesses.

By mid-December 2009 the Verkhovna Rada (Ukraine's parliament) had allocated over 600 million hryvnya to fight the flu epidemic in Ukraine.

== Comparisons within Europe ==
On 13 November 2009, the WHO announced that, based on data collected from 43 European countries, Ukraine had the 8th highest infection rate of A/H1N1 in Europe (following Norway, Sweden, Bulgaria, Moldova, Iceland, Ireland and Russia). Furthermore, Belarus, Kazakhstan, Poland, various regions of Russia, Northern Ireland, Turkey, Finland, and Ukraine had a high sickness rate of А/Н1N1 flu.

According to Jukka Pukkila, head of a WHO international mission to Ukraine, "there is no difference concerning the rate of A/H1N1 flu infection in Ukraine compared to other countries". WHO tests of the H1N1 pandemic virus samples taken from Ukrainian patients haven't exposed any signs of mutation.

A total of 22 countries had given assistance to Ukraine in fighting its flu epidemic by November 2009.

== See also ==
- H1N1
- 2009 swine flu pandemic
- 2009 flu pandemic vaccine
- Swine influenza
- Ukraine
- Influenza
