= Ryabokon =

Ryabokon or Riabokon (Ukrainian: Рябоконь) is a surname. It is related to the surname Ryabokin or Riabokin (Ukrainian: Рябокінь).

Notable people with the surname include:

- Oleg Riabokon (born 1973), Ukrainian politician and lawyer
- Oleksandr Ryabokon (born 1964), Ukrainian footballer
- Stepan Ryabokon (born 1993), Russian footballer
