= Racism in Ukraine =

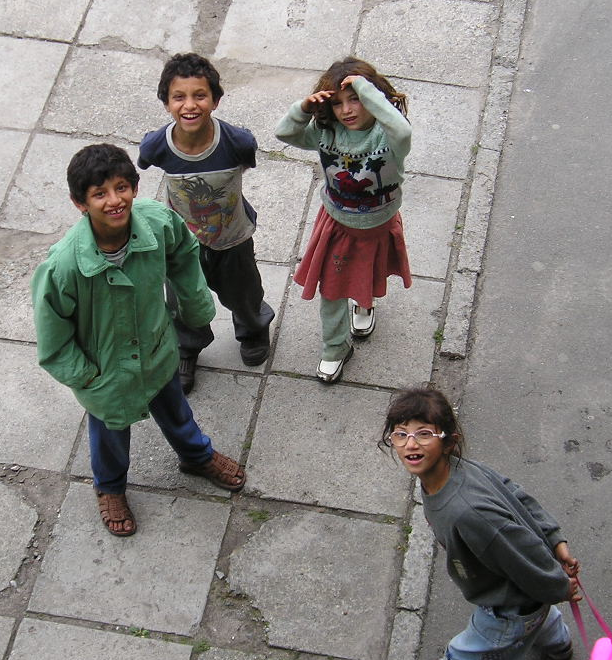
Romani children in Vinnytsia

Ukraine is a multi-ethnic country that was formerly part of the Soviet Union. Valeriy Govgalenko argues that racism and ethnic discrimination has arguably been a largely fringe issue in the past, but has had a climb in social influence due to ultra-nationalist parties gaining attention in recent years. There have been recorded incidents of violence where the victim's race is widely thought to have played a role, these incidents receive extensive media coverage and are usually condemned by all mainstream political forces. Human Rights Watch reported that "racism and xenophobia remain entrenched problems in Ukraine". In 2012 the European Commission against Racism and Intolerance (ECRI) reported that "tolerance towards Jews, Russians and Romani appears to have significantly declined in Ukraine since 2000 and prejudices are also reflected in daily life against other groups, who experience problems in accessing goods and services". From 2006 to 2008, 184 attacks and 12 racially motivated murders took place. In 2009, no such murders were recorded, but 40 racial incidents of violence were reported. It is worth considering that, according to Alexander Feldman, president of the Association of National and Cultural Unions of Ukraine, "People attacked on racial grounds do not report the incidents to the police and police often fail to classify such attacks as racially motivated and often write them off as domestic offence or hooliganism".

A 2010 poll conducted by the Kuras Institute of Political and Ethnic Studies showed that some 70 percent of Ukrainians estimates the nation's attitude towards other ethnical minorities as ‘conflict’ and ‘tense’.

== Race discrimination ==
Racially motivated attacks occur in Ukraine while police and courts do little to intervene, the Council of Europe said in a report made public February 2008 in Strasbourg. The report also expressed concern about attacks against rabbis and Jewish students, as well as the vandalism of synagogues, cemeteries and cultural centres. "However, criminal legislation against racially-motivated crimes has not been strengthened and the authorities have not yet adopted a comprehensive body of civil and administrative anti-discrimination laws", the body said. "There have been very few prosecutions against people who make antisemitic statements or publish antisemitic literature." Discrimination against the Romani community, continuing antisemitism, violence in Crimea and other acts of intolerance against various ethnic groups in Ukraine were singled out in the report by the Council of Europe's racism-monitoring body, the European Commission against Racism and Intolerance. Skinhead violence against Tatars and Jews is also frequent and police have offered little protection to the different communities, it said. And ECRI asked Ukrainian authorities to step up efforts to fight violence by skinheads against Africans, Asians For instance: in December 2006 racist attacks on foreign students have been reported by the Council of Europe. The council stated that students were reluctant to report attacks because of police response to these attacks seemed to be inadequate. Many of these incidents are conducted by "skinheads" or neo-Nazis in Kyiv, but similar crimes have also been reported throughout the country. In addition to incidents of assault, persons of African or Asian heritage may be subject to various types of harassment, such as being stopped on the street by both civilians and law enforcement officials. Individuals belonging to religious minorities have also been harassed and assaulted in Kyiv and throughout Ukraine.

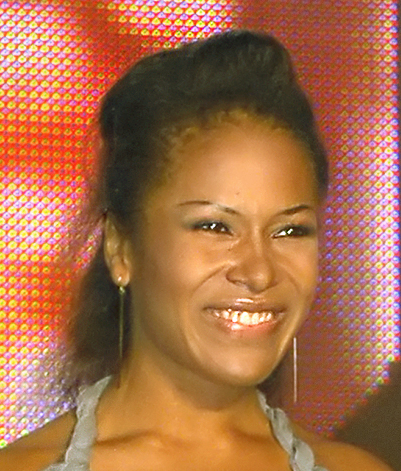
Gaitana, Ukrainian singer of Ukrainian and Congolese descent

Ukraine does not currently have well established movements against illegal immigration or certain ethnic groups that are common in other former Soviet states. As a European country Ukraine is prone to outside influence from the neo-Nazi and supremacist movements beyond its borders. For example, in areas of Southern Ukraine that have closer cultural and linguistic ties with Russia a number of neo-Nazi groups resemble those in neighbouring Russia.

Since 2005, nongovernmental (NGO) monitors in Ukraine have documented a dramatic rise in violent crimes with a suspected bias motivation. While incidents occurring in Kyiv have been most accurately documented, there is evidence that incidents of violence are taking place throughout the country, including the cities of Cherkasy, Chernivtsi, Kharkiv, Luhansk, Lutsk, Lviv, Mykolaiv, Odesa, Sevastopol, Simferopol, Ternopil, Vinnytsia, and Zhytomyr.

Representatives of the Ministry of Justice and members of Ukrainian parliament stated that discrimination views and antisocial attitudes are practiced by a minority of the population, by fringe organizations, and by younger generation of Ukrainians; they say they are most alarmed by the younger Ukrainian's attitudes. The fact that, during the 2007 parliamentary elections, the right wing parties espousing xenophobic and racist ideology received very little support from the electorate, also points to the unpopularity of such ideas among the general population.

Bias-motivated violence has been largely committed against people of African and Asian origin, as well as people from the Middle East.

=== Discrimination against foreigners ===
According to a Western human rights organization, asylum seekers, refugees, students and labour migrants are among the victims of bias-motivated violence, which have also included diplomats, expatriate employees of foreign companies, members of visible minorities in Ukraine, and Ukrainians who have assisted hate crime victims. Foreign students, of which there are some forty thousand, have been among the principal victims of hate crimes. Small populations of citizens and immigrants of African origin are highly visible and particularly vulnerable targets of racism and xenophobia. Although relatively few people of African origin reside in Ukraine, the rate of violence against this group has been extraordinary. African refugees, students, visitors, and the handful of citizens and permanent residents of African origin have lived under constant threat of harassment and violence. During the 2009 flu pandemic in Ukraine in November 2009 the police of Transcarpathia asked the local population to report every instance of meeting or communicating with foreigners, The police explains that the reason for such a request was "the worsening of the epidemiological situation in Transcarpathian Region and the increasing risk of getting ill." The Uzhhorod police removed the request from their website after media drew attention to it.

=== Discrimination against Romani ===
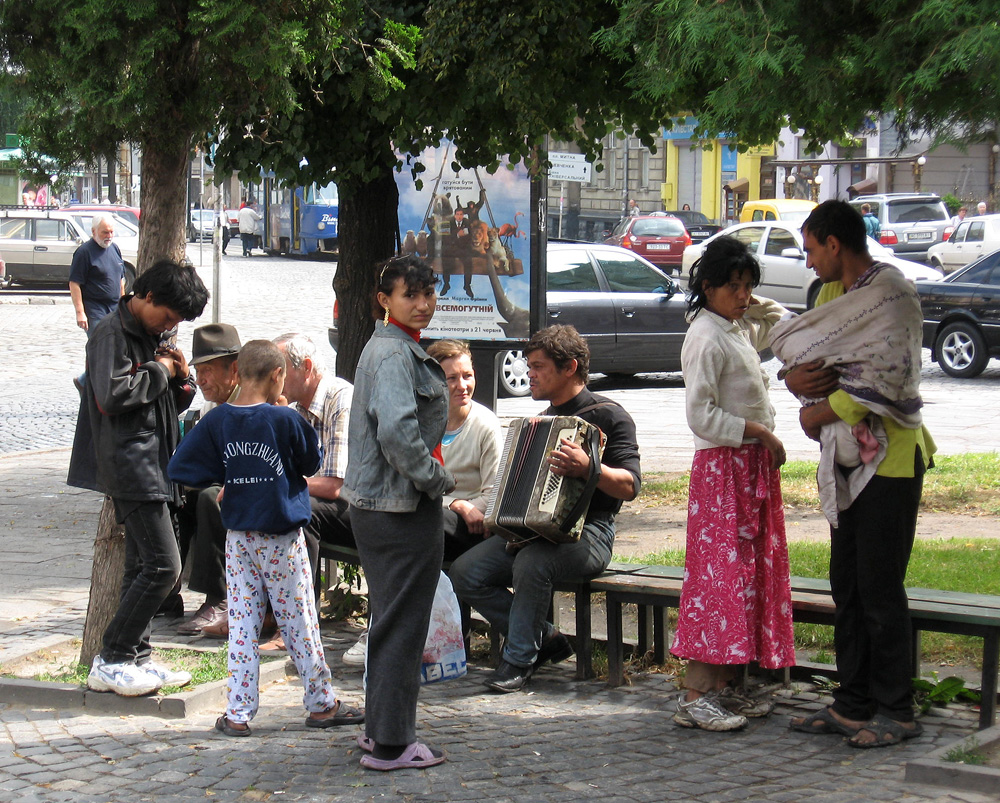
Romani in Lviv (2007)

It is alleged that the country's estimated 400,000 Romani people, (government figures were 47,600) faces both governmental and societal discrimination. In October 2006 the European Roma Rights Centre complained to the UN Human Rights Committee about violence against Romani in the country, racial targeting and profiling by police against Romani, discrimination in social programs and employment against Romani, and the widespread lack of necessary documentation for Roma to enjoy access to social services and protections. In many areas of the country, poverty often forced Romani families to withdraw their children from school. There were numerous reports of Romani being evicted from housing, removed from public transportation, denied public assistance, kicked out of stores, and denied proper medical treatment. According to the Roma Congress of Ukraine, the findings of the 2003 national study on social integration of Romani remain current: only 38 percent of Romani are economically active, 21 percent have permanent employment, and 5 percent have temporary employment, mainly seasonal jobs. Representatives of Romani and other minority groups claimed that police officials routinely ignored, and sometimes abetted, violence against them. In 2012 the European Commission against Racism and Intolerance (ECRI) reported that "Many Roma do not dispose of basic identity documents. This seriously affects their access to social rights as well as the right to vote."

There were some reports that the government was addressing the longstanding problems faced by the Romani community. For example, the Chirikli fund reported in fall 2006 that a court in Odesa reviewed its complaint against a school director who refused to admit a Romani child to school. The court refused to review claims of discrimination but the case was still under review for possible administrative violations as of December. A court in Donetsk refused to accept a similar complaint. However, in 2012 ECRI stated "government policies themselves at times appear also to ignore the situation of marginalisation and discrimination faced by Roma".

=== Discrimination against Tatars ===
Following the collapse of the USSR and the independence of Ukraine, Tatars were allowed to return to Crimea. However, no decisions were made on what land, if any, would be returned to Tatars, so most Tatar families ended up living in arid villages relying on subsistence farming.

In Crimea, (Note: The status of Crimea and the status of the city of Sevastopol are currently under dispute between Russia and Ukraine; Ukraine and the majority of the international community consider the Crimea an autonomous republic of Ukraine and Sevastopol is considered one of Ukraine's cities with special status, while Russia, on the other hand, considers the Crimea a federal subject of Russia and it also considers Sevastopol one of Russia's three federal cities.) native Tatars believe that they are discriminated against due to high unemployment and lack of landownership. Conflicts between Tatars and their Slavic neighbors in recent years have led to mass fist fights, the vandalism of graveyards and even murders, alongside evictions of Tatars by police from land wanted by developers. The Ukrainian government is slowly acknowledging the tensions. Crimean Tatars asserted that discrimination by mainly ethnic Russian officials in Crimea deprived them of employment in local administrations and that propaganda campaigns, particularly by Russian Cossacks, promoted hostility against them among other inhabitants of Crimea. Furthermore, the Ukrainian government had put restrictions in place on the formation of political parties, which made it very difficult for groups like the Crimean Tatars to form a political party due to their concentration in only one part of the country.

Leaders among the Crimean Tatars called for changes to the electoral process so that they might achieve greater representation within both the Crimean and national parliaments. However, due to laws that did not allow for the creation of political parties on a regional level, Tatar organisations were left with the only option of joining other parties and parliamentary blocs. Such was the level of exclusion from politics that the Tatars occupied only seven seats in the hundred-member Crimean Parliament despite making up twelve percent of the population.

More than 250,000 Crimean Tatars have returned to their homeland following Ukrainian independence, changing the ethnic composition of the Autonomous Republic of Crimea. Tatars, who are a different ethnicity from ethnic Russians, speak a separate language, and are predominantly Muslim, has resulted in increased ethnic and religious tensions in the Crimea and contributed to an increase in bias-motivated attacks against Crimean Tatars and their property.

==== After the annexation ====
The discrimination against Tatars escalated sharply following the annexation of Crimea by Russia in 2014.

=== Discrimination against Poles ===
Different interpretations of bitter events regarding Poles and Ukrainians during World War II have led to a sharp deterioration of the relations between the nations since 2015. In April 2017 the Ukrainian Institute of National Remembrance forbade the exhumation of Polish victims of the 1943 massacres of Poles in Volhynia and Eastern Galicia as part of the broader action of halting the legalization of Polish memorial sites in Ukraine, in a retaliation for the dismantling of a monument to UPA soldiers in Hruszowice, Western Poland.

Polish President Andrzej Duda expressed his concerns with appointment to high Ukrainian offices of people expressing nationalistic anti-Polish views. The Ukrainian foreign ministry stated that there is no general anti-Polish sentiment in Ukraine.

=== Latest developments ===
A report released by Amnesty International in July 2008 warned of an "alarming rise" in racist attacks in Ukraine. According to the report, more than 60 people were targeted in racist violence in 2007, six of them killed; More than 30 people were victims of racist attacks since the beginning of 2008 and at least four had been killed at the time of the report. Rights advocates are puzzled by the rise in hate crimes but they claim government inaction is partly to blame. They also claim the government aggravates the problem by denying that racism is growing and only acknowledging isolated incidents. Rights groups claim Ukrainian hate groups are inspired by their counterparts in Russia. Russian skinheads help the local groups, they say, sharing tips and video clips on how to attack and torture their victims and how to safely leave the crime scene. According to the European Commission against Racism and Intolerance (in February 2012) since 2008 "progress has been made in a number of fields".

In the 2022 Russian invasion of Ukraine, reports and online footage surfaced of African and Indian students who were attempting to escape the conflict being denied entry onto trains and through the Poland border, with white Ukrainian children, women, and men taking their spots. Reports also claimed that Internet users in Ukraine provided the students false information so that they mistakenly present themselves as Russian soldiers and risk death. South African and Nigerian officials commented on these reports condemning the treatment of Africans. Filippo Grandi, the United Nations High Commissioner for Refugees, also condemned the treatment of "some Black and Brown people fleeing Ukraine".

== Government's response ==
The government's response to the recent surge in hate crimes has been insufficient and inconsistent. President Viktor Yushchenko and some other senior government officials have spoken out against racist and xenophobic violence. However, these statements have been undermined by other declarations by some key law enforcement officials whose remarks suggested a denial of the problem. On March 30, 2007, former Interior Minister Vasyl Tsushko condemned acts of xenophobia and racism at a meeting of representatives of embassies and international organizations. Tsushko denied any massive instances of xenophobic incidents in Ukraine, but recognized that single incidents could lead to an overall negative tendency.

The authorities did take some important steps in 2007, including the creation of specialized units in key government agencies. Also, in early 2008, there were several guilty verdicts handed down in cases of violence in which incitement to hatred based on nationality, race, or religion were among the charges. However, these verdicts were exceptions to a pattern in which violent crimes with an apparent bias motivation are more often treated as hooliganism. Law enforcement officials lack training and experience in recognizing and recording the bias motivations behind attacks, limiting the ability of prosecutors to pursue hate crime cases in court. An inadequate legal framework also hinders the ability of criminal justice officials to prosecute hate crimes as such.

In November 2009 the Verkhovna Rada (the Ukrainian parliament) adopted a law that raised the maximum sentences for crimes committed on the ground of racial, national, or religious hostility.

== Statistics on violent crime motivated by racism and discrimination ==
There is no government data collection or regular public reporting expressly on violent hate crimes. The most reliable information is produced by NGO and IGO monitoring. Thus, it is impossible to see the full extent of the problem. Human Rights First and Amnesty International released reports on the dramatic rise of hate-motivated violence in Ukraine. Both organizations relied on the nongovernmental monitors and closely collaborated with the Diversity Initiative, a coalition of some 40 NGOs, which was created in April 2007 in response to the unprecedented increase in the number of suspected racially motivated assaults. The Diversity Initiative is supported by the International Organization for Migration (IOM) and the Office of the United Nations High Commissioner for Refugees (UNHCR).

The United Nations Resident Coordinator called for an end to discrimination against Jews. An ambassadorial working group was formed and a Diversity Initiative, a coordination group under the leadership of the IOM and UNHCR, was established to provide a forum for anti-discrimination policies – with the overall objective to create a consolidated response to racism and xenophobia in Ukraine. As a result of concerted efforts, the Government stepped up its response to this challenge; an official repudiation of racism by President Viktor Yuschenko issued; the Government adopted an Action Plan on Counteraction to Racism; and the Security Service of Ukraine (SBU) established a special unit to counteract xenophobia and intolerance. Policy advice was provided and best practices from European countries was shared with Government. There was a wide-scale information campaign, including broadcasting of public service announcements.

== See also ==
- Antisemitism in Ukraine
- Demographics of Ukraine
- Geography of antisemitism
- Human rights in Ukraine
- Interregional Academy of Personnel Management
- LGBT rights by country or territory
- LGBT rights in Ukraine
- Racism by country
