= Ukrainian Marketing Association =

- Formation: 2005
- Type: An umbrella organization specializing in the professional development and standards of marketing and sociological research organizations in Ukraine.
- Headquarters: Kyiv, Ukraine
- Website: uam.in.ua/eng

Ukrainian Marketing Association (Ukrainian: Українська Асоціація Маркетингу) is a Ukrainian non-governmental professional development and industry standards organization for marketing and sociological research companies established in Ukraine.

== Membership ==
All-Ukrainian public organization UMA has two types of membership: Individual and collective.

- Individual members: market specialists and managers of different branches of industry, managers, and experts of marketing research agencies, lecturers of the marketing departments in the education institutions.
- Collective members: marketing and consulting agencies, advertisement companies, educational establishments, firms which develop software for market specialists, enterprises of different field of national economy.

A list of affiliated organizations includes:

- Research & Branding Group (Ukraine)

== Publications ==
The Ukrainian Marketing Association publishes an online subscription Marketing Industry Newspaper and an annual report on its activities and membership.
