= Vasyl Humenyuk =

Ukrainian politician

Vasyl Protyvsikh

Personal details
- Born: October 16, 1946 (age 79) Oleshkiv, Ivano-Frankivsk Oblast, Ukrainian SSR
- Party: Independent

Vasyl Protyvsikh (Ukrainian: Василь Противсіх) (born Vasyl Vasylyovych Humenyuk, Ukrainian: Василь Васильович Гуменюк, born October 16, 1946) is a Ukrainian politician. He is best known as a self-nominated candidate in the 2010 Ukrainian presidential election, for which he changed his second name to Protyvsikh (ukr. for "Against all"). During the 2010 election he received 0.16% of the votes.

== Biography ==
Vasyliy Humenyuk completed a law degree at the Ivan Franko National University of Lviv after serving in the Soviet army. As a member of the Communist Party of Ukraine (although he insist he "never was and never will be a Leninist") Humenyuk was mayor of Yaremche from 1984 until the first democratic local elections in Ukraine in 1991. Later he headed the customs service in Ivano-Frankivsk Oblast. Humenyuk was numbered number 23 at party list of the electoral bloc KUCHMA during the 2007 Ukrainian parliamentary election.

Vasyliy nominated himself for the 2010 Ukrainian presidential election. On October 2, 2009, he changed his second name to Protyvsikh, that can be translated as "Against-everyone". Protyvsikh changed his surname to “express the opinions of all those citizens that are against all candidates and the disorder that Ukraine currently finds itself in”.

Protyvsikh claims "friends from around the world" assisted him in obtained the ₴2.5 million deposit needed for his registration as presidential candidate. Protyvsikh considered Yulia Tymoshenko his main opponent in the presidential elections.

Currently Protyvsikh is president of the Ivano-Frankivsk Chamber of Commerce. Protyvsikh wants Ukraine to have a banking system as Switzerland.

In the 2012 parliamentary elections, he ran in the 83rd electoral district (Ivano-Frankivsk) as a self-nominated candidate, and took 8th place among 10 candidates with 627 votes (0.62%).
