= Public Opinion Foundation =

State-owned polling institution

- Abbreviation: FOM
- Formation: 1992; 34 years ago
- Key people: Alexander Oslon (head)
- Website: fom.ru

The Public Opinion Foundation (Russian: Фонд Общественное Мнение, abbr. ФОМ, FOM) is a Russian state-affiliated polling and sociological research firm. It is considered one of the three leading sociological organizations in Russia alongside the state-owned Russian Public Opinion Research Center (VCIOM) and the independent Levada Center. The company is headed by Alexander Oslon.

FOM was founded in 1990 as part of VCIOM before becoming a separate entity in 1992. In the 1996 Russian presidential election, it was the polling firm for Boris Yeltsin. The New York Times described FOM in 2007 as "technically independent but considered friendly to the Kremlin", and some sources as late as the early 2010s characterized FOM as independent. FOM is currently considered a state-run organization, and often works on Russian government-funded projects.

In December 2011, FOM temporarily stopped publishing polls following a two-year-record drop in trust in prime minister Vladimir Putin, without giving a reason. A Proekt investigation in 2022 described government interference and pro-government bias in FOM and VCIOM surveys.

== See also ==
- FOM-Ukraine
