= Front for Change (Ukraine) =

Front for Change Фронт Змін
- Leader: Arseniy Yatsenyuk
- Founded: 26 June 2007 (political party); 25 December 2008 (public organisation)
- Dissolved: 15 June 2013
- Merged into: All-Ukrainian Union "Fatherland"
- Headquarters: Kyiv
- Youth wing: The young activists of the Front for Change
- Colours: Olive
- Slogan: Front of the future
- Regions (2010): 158 / 3,056

Website
- frontzmin.ua

Front for Change (Ukrainian: Фронт Змін, romanized: Front Zmin) is a Ukrainian public organization and a former political party in Ukraine, both led by Arseniy Yatsenyuk. The party merged into All-Ukrainian Union "Fatherland" in June 2013.

== History ==
The political party Front for Change was registered with the Ministry of Justice on June 26, 2007, and entered in the Register of political parties under number 140 as People's Toiling Party.

Before changing its name to Front of Change, from October 2008 through September 2009 it used to be named as the Democratic Front. In December 2008 candidate for the Ukrainian 2010 presidential elections Arseniy Yatsenyuk founded the public organization Front of change. Yatsenyuk was at the time a member of Parliament elected as part of the list of the Our Ukraine–People's Self-Defense Bloc.

Mayor of Uzhhorod Serhiy Ratushniak was alleged to have beaten a female campaigner of Front of Change early August 2009, a criminal case was soon opened against Ratushniak.

On April 12, 2010, the Ministry of Justice of Ukraine confirmed the political party Front for Change is now (also) led by Yatseniuk.

In the 2010 local elections the party won representative in 20 of the 24 regional parliaments, it did not win seats in the Supreme Council of Crimea.

In September 2011 Our Ukraine–People's Self-Defense Bloc faction leader in the Ukrainian parliament Mykola Martynenko joined the party.

According to party leader Yatseniuk the party is financed by "about 28 representatives of medium-sized businesses and small businesses".

Since June 2008 the parties popularity in opinion polls reached a stable 11%. A May 2010 poll by the Kyiv International Institute of Sociology showed that the party had the greatest support in western regions (9%), slightly lower support in central Ukraine (4%) and the least support in southern and eastern regions (2%). Yatsenyuk announced on 7 April 2012 the party will form a single list of candidates with All-Ukrainian Union "Fatherland" during the October 2012 Ukrainian parliamentary election. Yatseniuk at the time stressed "Front of Changes existed and will exist"., but later that same month hinted the alliance could lay basis for one single party. The party competed on one single party under "umbrella" party "Fatherland", together with several other parties, during the October 2012 parliamentary elections Front for Change leader Arseniy Yatsenyuk headed this election list; because "Fatherland"-leader Yulia Tymoshenko was imprisoned. During the election this list won 62 seats (25.55% of the votes) under the proportional party-list system and another 39 by winning 39 simple-majority constituencies; a total of 101 seats in Parliament.

The party (and Reforms and Order Party) merged into "Fatherland" on 15 June 2013, while the merger of For Ukraine! into Front for Change, which had been agreed upon in December 2011 was canceled. However, the party is still registered at the Ukrainian Ministry of Justice. In the 2020 Ukrainian local elections 1 person won a local seat on behalf of the party.

== Elections ==
Parliamentary since 2002 (year links to election page)
Year	Block	Votes	%	Mandates (const.)
2012^{[a]}				

Date	Party leader	Remarks
2007-2009	Viktor Vashkevych	
2009	Andriy Ivanchuk	
2009–present	Arseniy Yatsenyuk	

== See also ==
- People's Front (Ukraine)

== Notes ==
^{a} After the merger with Batkivshchyna
