= Oleksandr Pabat =

Ukrainian politician

- Олександр Пабат
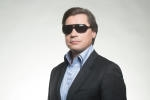

Deputy of the Kyiv City Council
- In office 2002–2020

Personal details
- Born: 22 March 1974 (age 52) Poltava, Ukrainian SSR, Soviet Union
- Party: Kyiv Civil Activists; Peoples' Salvation Army
- Spouse: Married
- Children: 2 sons
- Occupation: Businessman

Oleksandr Viktorovych Pabat (Ukrainian: Олександр Вікторович Пабат; born 22 March 1974) is a Ukrainian politician and businessman who was from 2002 to 2020 a member of the Kyiv City Council.

Pabat was a self-nominated candidate in the 2010 Ukrainian presidential election, during the election he received 0,14% of the votes.

In 2009 Pobat became leader of the Ukrainian political organisation Peoples' Salvation Army.

== Biography ==
Born in Poltava on March 22, 1974 he completed his education in Kyiv, in 2004, he graduated from the National Department of Economics, specializing in finance. Since 2004 he studied at the National Taras Shevchenko University of Kyiv, graduated from the Faculty of Law. Till 2000 Pabat worked in advertising for about a decade.

Since 2002 Pabat is a deputy of the Kyiv City Council. In 2002 he was elected for the Reforms and Order Party.

In 2005 Pabat founded Kyiv Civil Activists. Pobat headed the faction of Kyiv Civil Activists. Kyiv Civil Activists was an ally of mayor Leonid Chernovetsky. In 2004 Pabat took an active part in the events of the Orange Revolution, initiated a parallel vote count. In the 2006 Kyiv local election and 2008 Kyiv local election Pabat was elected for Kyiv Civil Activists.

In 2009 Pabat initiated the creation of the public movement "Peoples' Salvation Army."

Pabat was a candidate in the 2010 Ukrainian presidential election. His 2010 election program stated that the Ukrainian people are slaves in their own country, "The people of Ukraine live in a Latin American country slaving away to support the richest 50 families, terminators who know only how to steal, sell and destroy." In the election Pabat gained 0.14% of the votes.

In the 2012 Ukrainian parliamentary election Pabat was an independent candidate in single-member districts number 219 (first-past-the-post wins a parliament seat) located in Kyiv; but with 30.3% of the votes he lost to Batkivshchyna's Volodymyr Bondarenko.

In the 2014 Kyiv local election Pabat was reelected as deputy of the Kyiv City Council as an independent candidate. In the 2015 Kyiv local election he was reelected as a candidate of Petro Poroshenko Bloc.

Pabat failed to get elected in the 2020 Kyiv local election, as nominated by Andriy Palchevsky's Victory he and this new party failed to win any seats.

Pabat's hobbies are luxury cars; he owns a Maserati and a Porsche.
