= Serhiy Ratushniak =

Ukrainian politician (born 1961)

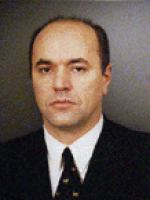

Mayor of Uzhhorod
- In office 1994–2002
- In office 2006–2010

People's Deputy of Ukraine
- In office 2002–2006

Personal details
- Born: Serhiy Mykolayovych Ratushniak; 17 February 1961 (age 65) Uzhhorod, Ukrainian SSR, Soviet Union
- Party: Independent, former parties include: Hromada, For United Ukraine, Our Ukraine, Regions of Ukraine, People's Party

Serhiy Mykolayovych Ratushniak (Ukrainian: Сергій Миколайович Ратушняк; born February 17, 1961) is a former long-time mayor of Uzhhorod, former People's Deputy of Ukraine, and a self-nominated candidate in the 2010 Ukrainian presidential election, in which he received 0.12% of the votes.

== Biography ==
Ratushniak was born in Uzhhorod, Ukrainian SSR. He entered politics in 1994 after creating RIO, a syndicate of enterprises engaged in beverage sales, the production of cured meats and taxi service. Ratushniak was charged in 2000 with embezzlement, but released after the charges were dropped.

Ratushniak was elected Mayor of Uzhhorod in the 1994 mayoral elections with 70% of the vote. In 1998 he registered as a candidate for the 1998 Ukrainian parliamentary election, but his registration was revoked shortly before the election. In the 1998 Uzhhorod mayoral elections he was reelected with 77% of the vote. Ratushniak was a member of the Zakarpattia Oblast Council from July 2000 to April 2002. In the 2002 Ukrainian parliamentary election he was elected to parliament in constituency 70 as a self-nominated candidate, and was simultaneously reelected as mayor, but chose to be a People's Deputy of Ukraine. In parliament he joined various factions, such as "Democracy", "Democratic Initiatives", For United Ukraine, Our Ukraine, and Regions of Ukraine, until in 2005 he settled on the People's Party. In the 2006 mayoral elections he was reelected Mayor of Uzhhorod as a candidate of this party. He headed the Zakarpattia Oblast regional People's Party organisation until September 2009.

In the 2010 Ukrainian presidential election Ratushniak was a self-nominated candidate. In August 2009, Ratushniak was alleged to have beaten a female campaigner of fellow presidential candidate Arseniy Yatseniuk (Front of Change). A criminal case was soon opened against Ratushniak, accusing him of hooliganism, abuse of office and the violation of racial and national equality of citizens; Ratushniak denied the claims. Following his nomination, Ratushniak told a local paper that the Jews were to blame for all his country's troubles. Ratushniak also called Yatsenyuk, who is not Jewish, "a nasty Jew mason" and an "impudent little Jew" who was "successfully serving the thieves who are in power in Ukraine and is using criminal money to plough ahead towards Ukraine's presidency". The mayor told the Associated Press in a telephone interview: "Is everybody obliged to love Jews and Israel? If I don't like Jews and Israel, does that make me an anti-Semite?". Ratushniak had not previously been known to be antisemitic.

In late December 2009, Ratushniak called on President Viktor Yushchenko to declare war on Somalia, referring to the hostage-taking of Ukrainian sailors by Somali pirates. Ratushniak also stated that Americans should atone for killing native Americans before meddling in Ukraine's internal affairs. His election platform included taxing the rich, developing nuclear arms, and obliging all Ukrainians to learn another foreign language, apart from Russian. After the first round of the 2010 Ukrainian presidential election where Ratushniak gained only 0.12% of the votes, he called upon his voters to support Yulia Tymoshenko against Viktor Yanukovych in the second round: "She will be accepted by the international community and European governments, while every second of those will shut the door in front of Yanukovych."

In the 2010 mayoral elections, Ratushniak ended in second place.

Ratushniak tried to return to national politics in the 2012 Ukrainian parliamentary election. He contested single-member district number 68 located in Uzhhorod as an independent candidate; the seat was decided through first-past-the-post voting. However, he came second in this district with 19.51% of the votes.

In the 2014 Ukrainian parliamentary election, Ratushniak stood again as an independent candidate in the same single-member district as in 2012, but this time he placed fifth with 7.71% of the votes (winner Robert Horvat of Petro Poroshenko Bloc got 21.58%).

In the 2015 Uzhhorod mayoral elections Ratushniak failed to win as an independent candidate. Bohdan Andriyiv (of Revival) won the elections with 58.57% of the votes, while Ratushniak received 30.9% of the votes.

Ratushniak did not take part in the 2019 Ukrainian parliamentary election. He had intended to run again in constituency 68, but his candidature was not approved by the Central Election Commission of Ukraine "due to an unjustified long stay outside Ukraine."

Ratushniak was again a candidate in the 2020 Uzhhorod mayoral elections. He finished third with 18% of the votes.
