= People's Salvation Army =

People's Salvation Army Народна армія спасіння
- Leader: Oleksandr Pabat
- Founded: 2009
- International affiliation: None

Website
- Official website (in Ukrainian)

The People's Salvation Army (Ukrainian: Народна армія спасіння) is a Ukrainian political organisation.

== History ==
The movement was initiated in 2009 by Oleksandr Pabat. The organisation claims Ukraine is "on the brink of disaster" and it intends to "save" Ukraine through a structured plan where everybody can contribute to by attending mass rallies or calling a "hot line". The party claims that in March and April 2009 alone it held over 40 rallies and meetings in central and eastern Ukraine.

The movement supported candidate Oleksandr Pabat during the 2010 Ukrainian presidential election.
