= SOCIS =

Ukrainian political sociology company

SOCIS „СОЦІС - Центр соціальних та політичних досліджень"
- Type: Privately held company
- Industry: Sociology
- Founded: November 1993
- Headquarters: Kyiv, Ukraine
- Area served: Ukraine
- Key people: Ihor Hryniv
- Products: Political sociology
- Subsidiaries: TNS Ukraine
- Website: www.socis.kiev.ua

SOCIS (Ukrainian: TOB „СОЦІС - Центр соціальних та політичних досліджень", romanized: TOB „SOTsIS - Tsentr sotsialnykh ta politychnykh doslidzhen") is a political sociology company in Ukraine. It was one of the companies that performed rolling and exit polls for Ukrainian elections in 1998, 2002, 2004, and Ukrainian referendum in 2000. The company has been a member of The Gallup Organization since 1994. In 1999-2002 the original company has forked into TNS Ukraine and became a part of the Taylor Nelson Sofres market research group.

Results of exit polls performed by this company during the Ukrainian presidential election in 2004 were used as one of arguments leading to the Orange Revolution. In 2007 Due to the change in the development strategy of the SOCIS Center, the marketing research direction was restored and, accordingly, the name was changed to the SOCIS Center for Social and Marketing Research and the company logo. Today, the SOCIS Center has everything necessary to conduct various types of research - from developing a research program to preparing a report.
