= Oleg Riabokon =

Ukrainian lawyer and politician (born 1973)

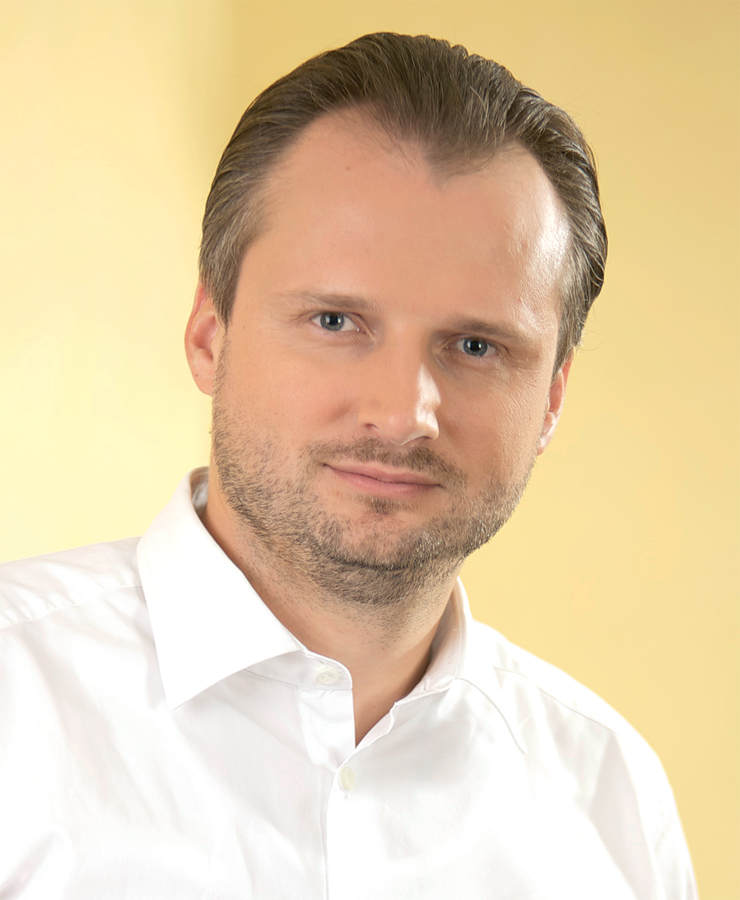

Personal details
- Born: 17 December 1973 (age 52) Vinnytsia, Ukrainian SSR (now Ukraine)
- Party: Independent
- Occupation: Lawyer
- Website: www.riabokon.com.ua

Oleg Riabokon (Ukrainian: Олег Рябоконь) is a Ukrainian lawyer. He was a managing partner of the law firm Magisters - Kyiv, Ukraine. Riabokon was a self-nominated candidate in the 2010 Ukrainian presidential election, during the election he received 0,03% of the votes.

== Biography ==
Riabokon graduated in 1995 from the International Law Department of the Institute of International Relations, Kyiv Taras Shevchenko National University and obtained his LL.M. degree from the Georgetown University (United States) in 1996.

Riabokon founded the Magisters law firm, specializing in international law and trade, in 1997 and was an adviser to various Ukrainian ministries in the 1994-2003 period. The firm is recognized by The International Who's Who of Trade and Customs Lawyers (1998–2006) as one of the world's leading lawyers in international trade and customs and recommended by the IFLR 1000 2008, Chambers Global 2008, Chambers Europe 2007, and other legal guides. The firm represented then-presidential candidate Victor Yushchenko in 2004. Their successful razzle-dazzle techniques set the stage for the cancellation of the fraudulent 2004 election and a repeat, won by Yushchenko.

Riabokon was awarded "Lawyer of the Year in Ukraine" in October, 2007. Riabokon quit his law firm in September 2009.

=== 2010 Ukrainian presidential candidate ===
Riabokon was a candidate for President of Ukraine in the 2010 Ukrainian presidential elections. During the campaign Riabokon said many of his rival candidates have either worked for or are currently part of the corrupt and impotent political establishment, which he likens to an "evil" swamp. "But if I break up a clear stream of clean water, all of a sudden people will reorient themselves and will come to the clean source of water". Riabokon referred to himself as the "technical candidate of civil society," and claimed that while he was a newcomer to politics, he had the necessary experience to change Ukraine. He wanted to become president because otherwise he didn't saw "any future for the country." His election program espoused the universally-accepted cornerstones of democracy: ensuring a vibrant civil society, an accountable and transparent government and the rule of law. He wants to see direct representation in government much like how Switzerland functions. During the election Riabokon received 0,03% of the votes, the lowest percentage of all candidates.

=== Associations ===
- American Bar Association (Associate member)
- International Bar Association (Member)
- Ukrainian Bar Association (Treasurer of the Board)
- U.S.-Ukraine Business Council (Affiliate member)
