= Egorov Puginsky Afanasiev & Partners =

International law firm

Egorov Puginsky Afanasiev & Partners (EPA&P)
- Headquarters: Moscow
- No. of offices: 6
- No. of attorneys: 31 partners, 300 attorneys
- Major practice areas: General practice
- Revenue: 2019: 163 mil. €. 2012: 118 mil. €. 2011: 97.2 mil. €. 2009: 90 mil. €
- Date founded: 1993
- Founders: Nikolai Egorov, Dimitry Afanasiev, Stanislav Puginsky
- Website: epam.ru

Egorov Puginsky Afanasiev & Partners (EPA&P; Russian: Его́ров, Пуги́нский, Афана́сьев и партнёры (ЕПАиП)) is an established international law firm in the CIS with offices in Russia, UAE, Ukraine, Belarus, and associated offices in London and Cyprus.

== History ==
The firm was founded by Nikolai Egorov, (Note: Nikolai Dmitrievich Egorov (Russian: Николай Дмитриевич Егоров; born 26 April 1947, Leningrad, Soviet Union) served in the Northern Fleet from 1966 to 1969. Egorov, who graduated in 1975 from the law faculty of Leningrad State University as one of the closest friends of Egorov's classmate Vladimir Putin, reintroduced Putin in the early 1990s to Anatoly Sobchak who, as mayor of Saint Petersburg, was a client of Egorov's law firm. From 1984 to 1992, Egorov headed the Department of Civil Law at Saint Petersburg University where he taught Dmitry Kozak. In September 1992, Nikolai Egorov co-founded the company CJSC JV "Petrointeroil" (Russian: АОЗТ/ЗАО СП "Петроинтеройл") together with Sergey Roldugin, Nikolay Khrameshkin, Vladimir Dmitrievich Yakovlev, Andrey Bulutanov and the other co-founders: the Swedish company Arne Larrson & Partners, Kronstadt Terminal JSC, Tyumenpetroleum JSC, the Baltika Trading House, and St. Petersburg Intertrade LLP (SPb Intertrade) (Russian: ТОО "Санкт-Петербург Интертрейд" ("СПб Интертрейд")), which Egorov founded in January 1992 placing Andrey Bulutanov as general director and gave Egorov a 17% stake with the controlling 50% stake held by the Vladimir Putin headed and Saint Petersburg based Mayor's Committee on Foreign Relations. In 1993, Egorov co-founded the St. Petersburg based Egorov Puginsky Afanasiev & Marx Law Firm (EPAiM) which was later renamed Egorov Puginsky Afanasiev & Partners (EPA&Partners): the "Marx" in the former name was from the American Bruce Marks.) Dimitry Afanasiev, and Boris Puginsky in Moscow in 1993, when Western corporations were beginning to expand into the post-Soviet states.

To support the Russian Ministry of Foreign Affairs in 2004, Egorov Puginsky Afanasiev & Partners represented the interests of a Russian diplomat and two GRU agents who were arrested on 19 February 2004 in Qatar for the assassination of Zelimkhan Yandarbiyev, who was a separatist leader from Chechnya who was murdered in Doha, Qatar, and gained the release of the diplomat; however, the two GRU agents, stood trial in Qatar and, on 30 June 2004, received life sentences for murdering Zelimkhan Yandarbiyev but, in December 2004, the two GRU agents were transferred back to Russia to serve their terms in Russia.

In July 2011, Egorov Puginsky Afanasiev & Partners merged with the international law firm Magisters. Magisters was founded in Kyiv in 1997, as Magister & Partners. Its founders, lawyers Oleg Riabokon and Serhii Sviriba were studying of the Kyiv Institute of International Relations Law department, and the idea to establish a law firm came to them right at the university prom. In 2006, "Magister & Partners" merged with Ukrainian law firm "Pravis:Reznikov, Vlasenko & Partners" and launched in Russia by merging with "Legas Legal Solutions", this merge became the first-ever cross-border merger between independent law firms in the CIS and marked the beginning of the Firm's CIS-wide expansion. The years 2008 and 2009 have been a period of active expansion for Magisters. The firm merged with a Belarusian law firm "BelJurBureau" and opened an office in Astana, Kazakhstan. Early 2009, Magisters also set up a representative office in London, UK.

The firm's Kyiv office was raided by the Ukrainian police on February 3, 2011, for undisclosed reasons.

In 2015, firm chairman Afanasiev was awarded "European Managing Partner of the Year" by The Lawyer European Awards.

== Locations ==
- Moscow, St Petersburg
- Kyiv
- London
- Minsk

== See also ==
- Gorsha Sur
