= FOM-Ukraine =

Political sociology company in Ukraine

FOM-Ukraine ФОМ-Україна
- Type: Privately held company
- Industry: Sociology
- Founded: 2006
- Headquarters: Kyiv, Ukraine
- Area served: Ukraine
- Products: Political sociology
- Parent: FOM (Moscow), Ukrainian Marketing Group (Kyiv)
- Website: www.fom.ru/projects

The FOM-Ukraine (Ukrainian: ФОМ-Україна, Russian: ФОМ-Украина) is a political sociology company in Ukraine. It is a joint venture of the FOM (Russian: Фонд "Общественное мнение"), Moscow and Ukrainian Marketing Group (Russian: Украинской маркетинговой группы), Kyiv.

The results of exit polls performed by FOM (Moscow) company favoring Viktor Yanukovych were the only ones allowed to be publicized on TV during the Ukrainian presidential election in 2004. All other polling was censored.
