= Research & Branding Group =

Ukrainian non-governmental marketing and sociological research company

- Formation: 2005
- Type: An independent research and brand-consulting company specializing in all types of marketing and sociological researches.
- Headquarters: Kyiv, Ukraine
- Website: rb.com.ua/eng/

Research & Branding Group (Ukrainian: Дослідницька та бренд-консалтингова компанія, romanized: Doslidnytska ta brend-konsaltynhova kompaniia) is a Ukrainian non-governmental marketing and sociological research company.

Research and Branding undertake a number of significant sociological public opinion polls on public policy, public opinion and politics in Ukraine. Its reports are widely published within and outside of Ukraine and form the basis of development of political strategy and public policy.

The Research & Branding Group has three main areas of focus

- R&B RESEARCH – organizing and conducting marketing and sociological researches
- R&B BRANDING – creation of brands, brand elements, positioning and promotion strategy
- R&B ELECTION – diagnostics of socio-political situation in regions, developments of election campaign strategies, analysis of risks of political investments

== Professional associations ==
Research & Branding Group is member of Ukrainian Marketing Association (UMA) and also a member of the European society of public opinion researchers and marketing (ESOMAR)

Whilst conducting researches they adhere to quality standards of marketing researches of UMA and the ESOMAR Codex, that guarantee the accordance of their work with national and international standards.

Kopatko Yevhen Eduardovych is the founder. He is also the head of the Donetsk Information and Analytical Center (DIAC). On the eve of the early parliamentary elections in Ukraine in 2007, he was one of the signatories of the famous "Appeal of the creative intelligentsia of Ukraine to the parties of the ruling coalition." In 2017, he acquired Russian citizenship.
