= 2014 Kyiv local election =

- 25 May 2014

All 120 seats to the Kyiv City Council and Mayor of Kyiv
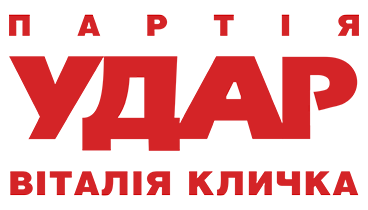

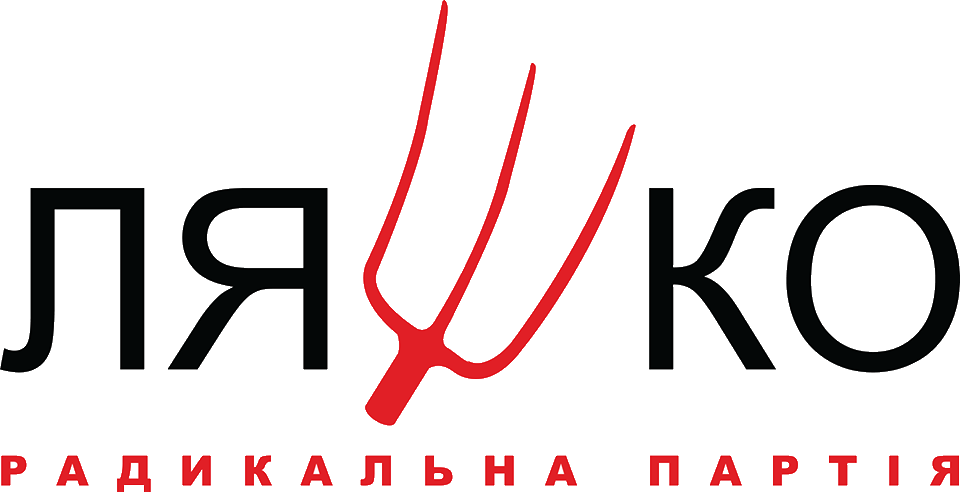

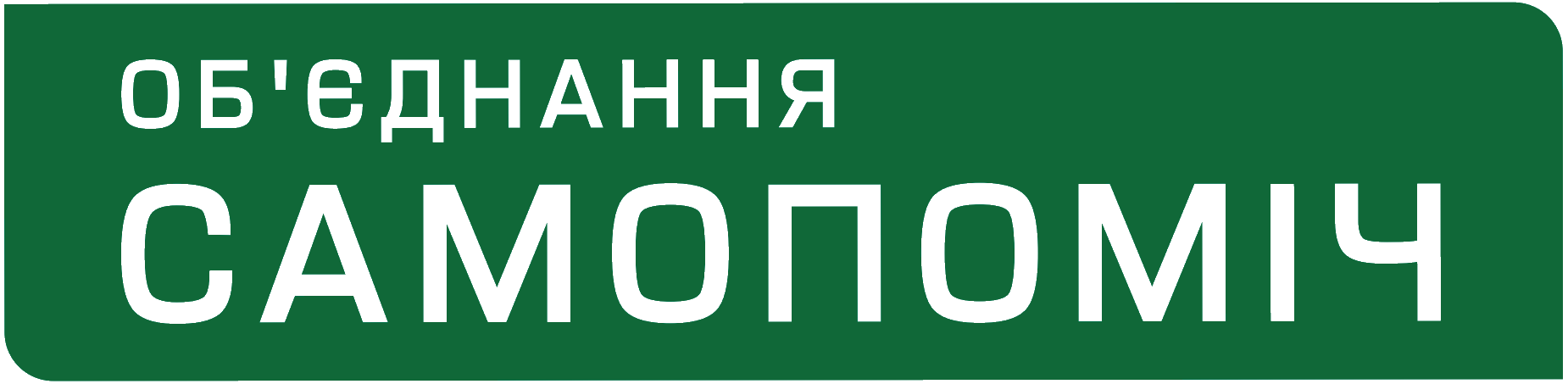

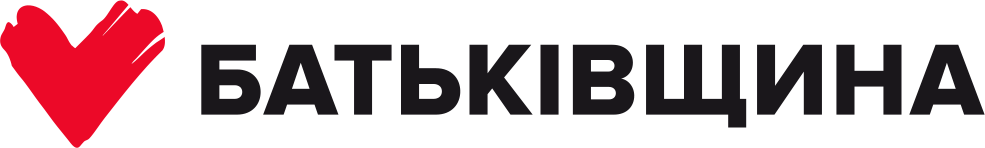

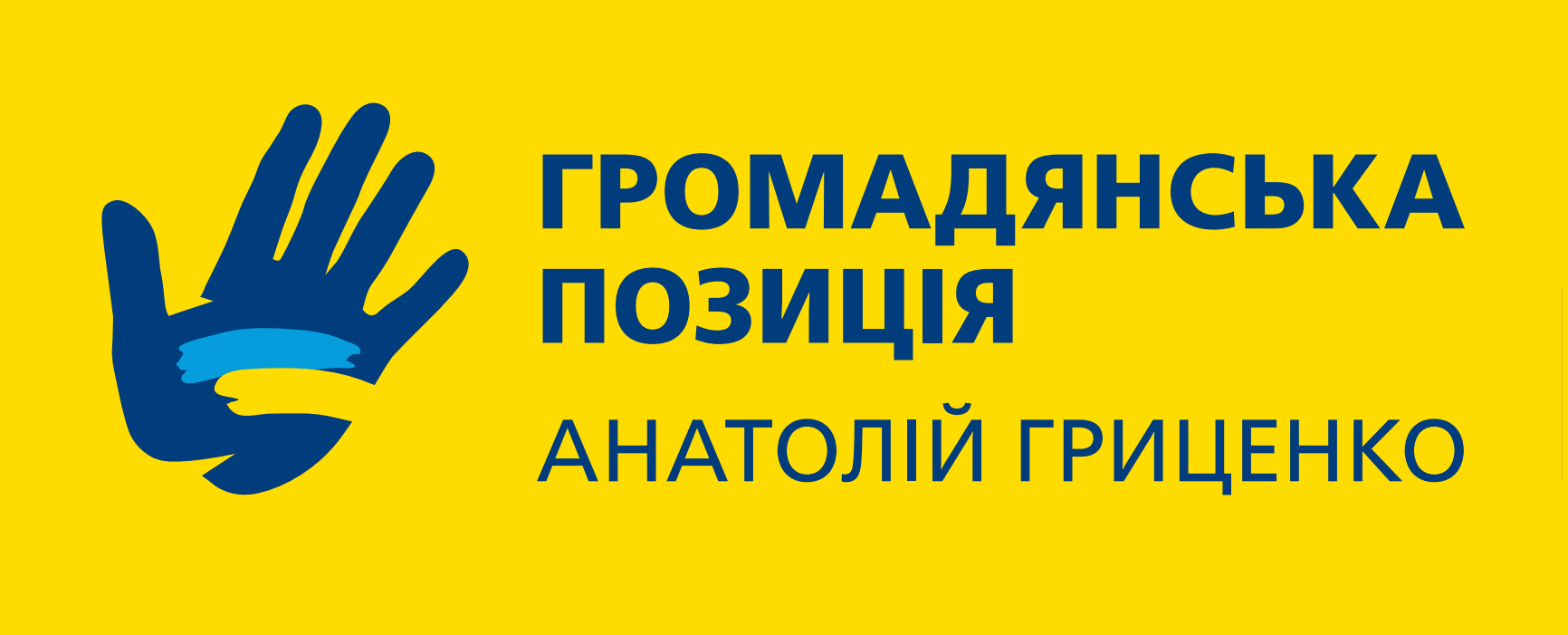
	First party	Second party	Third party
Party	UDAR	Radical Party	Self Reliance
Percentage	40.54	9.2	6.87
	Fourth party	Fifth party	Sixth party
Party	Svoboda	Batkivshchyna	Civil Position
Percentage	6.49	4.14	3.63%
Mayor before election
Halyna Hereha (Acting)
Elected Mayor
Vitali Klitschko
UDAR

Local elections in Kyiv for the post of Mayor and members of Kyiv City Council took place on 25 May 2014, as part of the 2014 Ukrainian local elections. Vitali Klitschko won the mayoral election with almost 57% of the votes, while his party the Ukrainian Democratic Alliance for Reform won 73 of the 120 seats in the Kyiv City Council.

The next Kyiv local elections were held in October 2015.

== Background ==
Secretary of the Kyiv City Council Halyna Hereha has been acting mayor since Leonid Chernovetsky resigned as the Mayor of Kyiv on 1 June 2012. Hereha asked the Verkhovna Rada (Ukraine's parliament) to issue an instruction on holding an early mayoral election on 19 July 2012; the parliament had not considered this issue yet. On 7 March 2013, the Verkhovna Rada Committee on State Building and Local Government recommended that Parliament should schedule the elections of the Mayor of Kyiv and members of the Kyiv City Council for 2 June 2013. On 2 April 2013, the Verkhovna Rada failed to set any date for the elections because the Party of Regions faction wanted to wait for a ruling from the Constitutional Court of Ukraine on "whether regular elections to local government agencies could be held at different time intervals, rather than simultaneously". The Constitutional Court started considering this case on 11 April 2013. On 29 May 2013 the Constitutional Court set the date of the election as 25 October 2015. The court reasoned that amendments to the Constitution of Ukraine that came into force on 1 February 2011 stipulated that "the next local elections should be held simultaneously all over Ukraine on the last Sunday of October 2015."

The oppositional parties after the 2012 parliamentary election considered the City Council term of authority expired by July 2013 and effectively blocked attempts at its convening through mass protest in July 2013.

As of 7 March 2013, possible candidates for the post of the Mayor of Kyiv were Vitali Klitschko (UDAR), Andriy Illyenko (Svoboda), Petro Poroshenko (independent candidate) and Oleh Liashko (Radical Party of Oleh Lyashko).

Oleksandr Popov of Party of Regions and former Head of Kyiv City Administration stated in February 2013 that he was a candidate. On 14 December 2013 President Viktor Yanukovych suspended him as Head of the Kyiv City State Administration. The same day the General Prosecutor of Ukraine's Office handed "a notification on suspicion of abuse of power when ordering the Euromaidan police actions of 30 November 2013" to Popov. On 25 April 2014 the Party of Regions announced that they would not put forward a candidate for the elections.

The Verkhovna Rada set a date for the elections on 25 February 2014, just after the 2014 Ukrainian revolution. However, it was later decided that date should be 25 May 2014, the same day as the Ukrainian presidential election.

== Registered mayoral candidates ==
Mayoral candidates were able to nominate themselves from 23 April 2014 until 30 April 2014. 19 candidates competed for the post.

- Gennady Balashov (independent)
- Volodymyr Bondarenko (Fatherland)
- Oleh Derevyanko (Ukrainian People's Party)
- Viktor Dovhy (independent)
- Andriy Illyenko (Svoboda)
- Valeriy Kandruk (independent)
- Mykola Katerynchuk (European Party of Ukraine)
- Vitali Klitschko (UDAR)
- Oleksandr Komnatsky (Communist Party of Ukraine)
- Vyacheslav Kyrylenko (For Ukraine!)
- Andriy Mirgorodsky (independent)
- Oleksiy Mochanov (All-Ukrainian Union "Democrats")
- Ihor Nasalyk (independent)
- Oleksandr Omelchenko (Unity)
- Lesya Orobets (independent)
- Ivan Saliy (independent)
- Viktor Smaliy (independent)
- Lyudmyla Vasylenko (independent)
- A man named Darth Vader (Internet Party of Ukraine)

Yuriy Lutsenko expressed an interest in taking part in the election, but later withdrew. Also potential candidates were Yuriy Levchenko, Ihor Lutsenko, and Volodymyr Makeyenko.

Lesya Orobets and Ivan Saliy were withdrawn from the race on 13 May, but later they were restored as candidates on 16 May.

== Polls ==
=== Mayor of Kyiv ===
According to a telephone poll conducted prior to the election by Sociological group "RATING" from 25 February to 6 March 2013, about 55% of the eligible voters would go to polling stations, and 31% of them would vote in the mayoral elections for Klitschko, 20.3% for Popov, and 7% for Poroshenko (all of them possible candidates). This poll also showed that if Klitschko and Popov proceeded to a hypothetical second round, 60.4% (of the respondents determined to vote) would cast their ballots for Klitschko and 26.5% for Popov. A June 2013 poll by GfK Ukraine gave Klitschko 32.7%, Popov 15.9% and Poroshenko 11.9%; 12.8% would ignore the election if Klitschko would not run for mayor.

A poll conducted from 22 to 28 March 2014, by "RATING", showed that out of the potential candidates at the time, Mykola Katerynchuk was the most popular among voters: 12% of those who intended to vote would cast their ballots for him. The poll gave 11% to Anatoliy Hrytsenko, 8% to Oleh Lyashko, 8% to Volodymyr Bondarenko, 8% to Yuriy Lutsenko, 5% to Volodymyr Makeyenko, 4% to Vyacheslav Kyrylenko, 4% to Lesya Orobets, 3% to Andriy Illyenko, 2% to Tetiana Montian and 1% to I. Lutsenko. The relevance of this poll is limited as at the time, Klitschko was not among the potential candidates for mayor, and several of the potential candidates then went on to register as candidates for the 2014 presidential election.

=== Kyiv City Council ===
According to a poll conducted by Razumkov Center from 11 to 17 April 2014 (of the voters who had already determined their choice), 42.1% would vote for UDAR, 15.4% for Fatherland, 9.7% for Svoboda, 8.2% for Solidarity, 6.4% for European Party of Ukraine, 3.8% for Radical Party of Oleh Lyashko, 3.1% for Civil Position; Right Sector was close to the 3% barrier, since it had the support of 2.8% of those polled. (Note: In the poll conducted by Razumkov Center from 11 to 17 April 2014 1.6% of the respondents said they would vote for Party of Regions, 1.5% for Communist Party of Ukraine and Party "Kyiv is Above All", 1.3% for Democratic Alliance and 1.1% for Unity; Self Reliance would gain less than 1%. Besides, 7.1% of voters said they would support neither of the parties, and 8.6% said they won't take part in the elections, 14.9% found it difficult to answer.)

== Results ==
=== Mayoral election ===
Summary of the 25 May 2014 Kyiv mayoral election (main contenders)
Candidates	Votes	%	2008
Vitali Klitschko	765,020	57.46%	38.73%
Lesya Orobets	114,137	8.57%	Did not run
Volodymyr Bondarenko	107,333	8.06%	Did not run
Oleksandr Omelchenko	101,580	7.63%	3.73
Mykola Katerynchuk	69,505	5.22%	0.77
Andriy Illyenko	33,603	2.52%	Did not run
Oleksiy Mochanov	30,412	2.28%	Did not run
Gennadiy Balashov	26,415	1.98%	Did not run
Total (turnout )			

=== City Council election ===
35 parties took part in these elections. 10 parties won seats. Those seats were won in 60 majority constituencies and another 60 on party lists. Several parties, among them Party of Regions, disappeared from the local parliament.

Summary of the 25 May 2014 Kyiv City Council elections (main contenders)
Parties	Votes	%	Seats (proportional representation)	Seats (constituencies)	(proportional representation compared with proportional representation of 2008 election)
UDAR		40.54%	30	47	29,93%
Radical Party		9.2%	7	0	9,2%
Self Reliance		6.87%	5	0	6.87%
Svoboda		6.49%	5	1	4.41%
Fatherland		4.14%	3	0	18,65
Civil Position		3.63%	3	0	3.63%
New Life		3.41%	3	0	3.41%
Unity		3.3%	2	0	1.04%
Democratic Alliance		3%	2	0	3%
Democratic Party of Ukraine			0	2	
Independent candidates			0	11	
Invalid ballot papers					
Total (turnout %)			60	60	
Note: UDAR contested the 2008 city council elections as political coalition Vitaliy Klychko Bloc, Fatherland as Yulia Tymoshenko Bloc and Unity as Oleksandr Omelchenko Bloc.

== See also ==
- Legal status and local government of Kyiv
