= Mariya Ionova =

Ukrainian politician

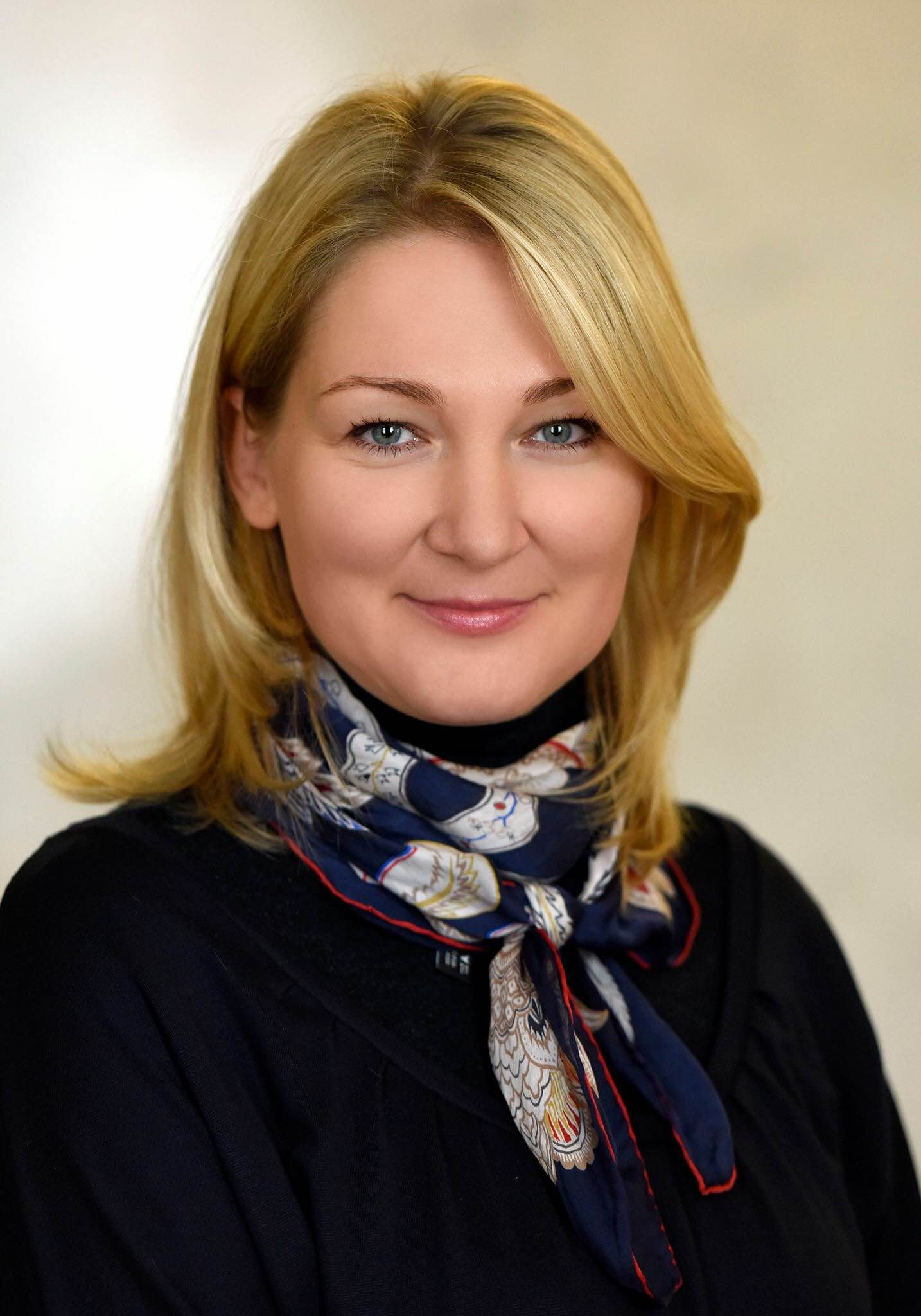
Ionova in 2015

Mariya Mykolayevna Ionova (Ukrainian: Марія Миколаївна Іонова, born May 31, 1978, in Kyiv) is a Ukrainian politician of the Petro Poroshenko Bloc.

== Biography ==
Ionova was born on May 31, 1978, in Kyiv. In 1999, she completed her insurance management studies at the Wadym Hetman National University of Economics in Kyiv and subsequently worked as a manager of Apifarm UK Limited . In 2000, she graduated in Foreign Economics at the Kyiv International Technical University. From December 2001 she worked as deputy director of the company BM-2000 in Kyiv. From May 2005 she worked as a consultant to the President of Ukraine. From December 2005 to August 2006, she was an advisor to the Diplomatic Protocol DivisionSecretariat of the President of Ukraine. From 2008 to 2012 she was a member of the Vitali Klitschko Bloc (which later emerged from the UDAR) Deputies of the Kyiv City Council.

In the 2012 parliamentary elections, Ionova was on the list position 16 of UDAR and was elected as a deputy to the Verkhovna Rada, where she was appointed chairman of the parliamentary committee for international cooperation. In early February 2013, Ionowa participated in an action of the opposition, in which the rostrum and the presidium of the Ukrainian Parliament was blocked.

On 16 January 2014 Ionowa had to be delivered to the hospital because of a physical assault by MP Volodymyr Malyshev from the Party of Regions. At the parliamentary elections in 2014, Ionova was on the list position 23 of the Petro Poroshenko Bloc.

On May 31, 2019, she was elected to the presidium and central political council of the European Solidarity party. She was elected as a Member of Parliament of the 9th convocation from the European Solidarity party, number 23 on the list as a member of the party. She is a member of the faction of the same name. Member of the Committee on Foreign Policy and Interparliamentary Cooperation.

Ionova is married and has a daughter.
