= New Life (party) =

New Life Нове Життя
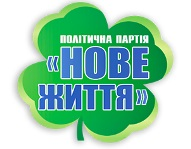
- Leader: Ihor Fedorenko
- Founded: 2010
- Kyiv City Council: 0 / 120

Website
- www.n-z.org.ua

New Life (Ukrainian: Нове Життя) is a political party in Ukraine.

== History ==
The party held was created on its first congress on April 17, 2010. On October 5, 2010 the party changed the name of the party from "Freedom" (Ukrainian: ВОЛЯ) to "New Life". In March 2011 the Ukrainian Ministry of Justice registered the party. The Chairman of the party was and is Ihor Fedorenko (born in 1974).

The party did not participate in the 2012 parliamentary elections.

In the 2014 Kyiv local election the party won 3 seats in the Kyiv City Council. In the simultaneously held mayoral elections the parties candidate Lesya Orobets finished second (after Vitali Klitschko who won with almost 57% of the votes) with 8.46%. Orobets at the time was a member of the Ukrainian Parliament elected during the 2012 Ukrainian parliamentary election on the party list of Batkivshchyna.

In the 2015 Kyiv local election the party lost its seats in the Kyiv City Council (it scored less than 2% of the vote).
