= European Platform =

Ukrainian political organization

European Platform (Ukrainian: Європейська платформа, romanized: Yevropeiska platforma) is a Ukrainian political organisation founded on 14 December 2006 by the European Party of Ukraine. The organisation never took part in Ukrainian parliamentary elections but has been represented Kyiv City Council (in the capital of Ukraine, Kyiv) as a part of the Mykola Katerynchuk Bloc. During the 2008 local election the party won 3.47% of the votes and 5 seats in the Kyiv City Council, but after the party dismissed 3 members the party is currently represented by only 2 deputies. In the 2012 Ukrainian parliamentary election the party competed in/for 1 constituency (seats); but it did not won in this constituency and thus missed parliamentary representation.

The aim of the organisation is:

- To apply to all political forces of democratic orientation and public bodies with the offer to join “The European Platform for Ukraine”.
- To hold active monitoring of the activities of the authorities towards following the European political standards and demand from the current coalition and the government successive actions towards realization of the European integration course by Ukraine.
