= 2008 Kyiv local election =

2008 Kyiv local elections
- 25 May 2008
- Mayoral election
- Turnout: 54.27%
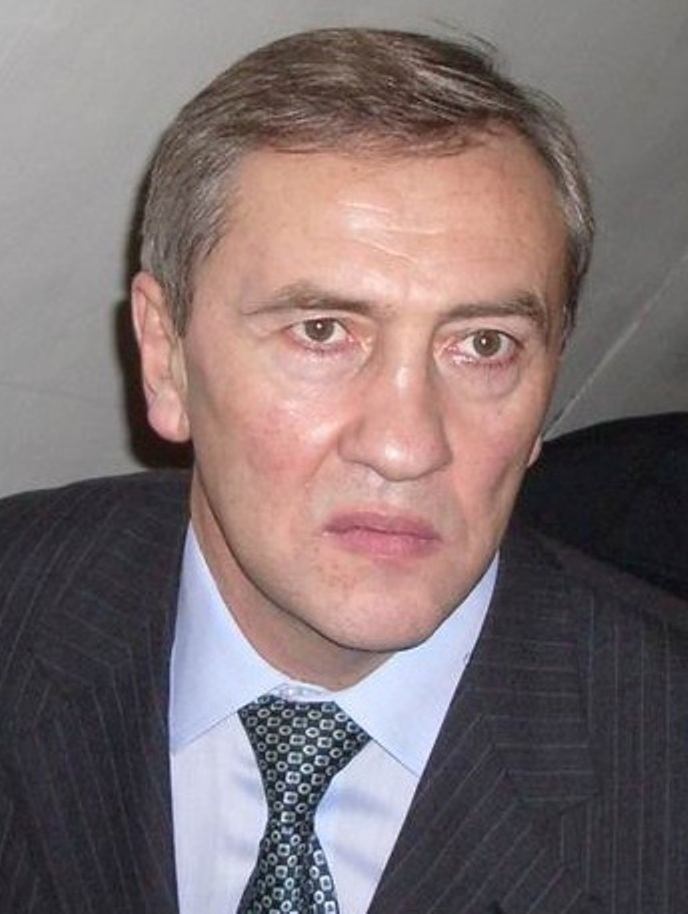

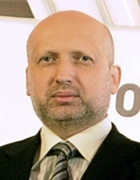

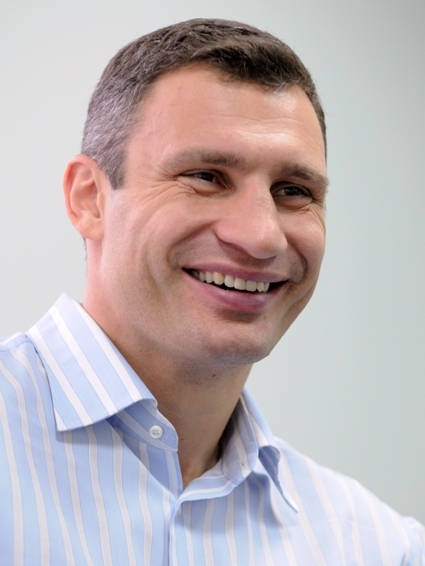

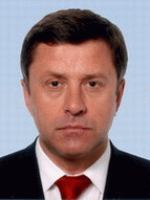
Candidate	Leonid Chernovetskyi	Oleksandr Turchynov
Party	ChLPU	Batkivshchyna
Alliance	Chernovetskyi Bloc	Tymoshenko Bloc
Percentage	37.77%	19.14%
Candidate	Vitali Klitschko	Viktor Pylypyshyn
Party	Independent	People's
Alliance	Klitschko Bloc	Lytvyn Bloc
Percentage	17.97%	6.72%
Mayor before election
Leonid Chernovetskyi
Chernovetskyi Bloc
Elected mayor
Leonid Chernovetskyi
Chernovetskyi Bloc
- City Council election
- All 120 seats in the Kyiv City Council; 61 seats needed for a majority
Party	Leader	Vote %	Seats	+/–
Chernovetskyi Bloc	Leonid Chernovetskyi	30.45	43	+22
Tymoshenko Bloc	Yulia Tymoshenko	22.79	32	−9
Klitschko Bloc	Vitali Klitschko	10.61	15	0
Lytvyn Bloc	Viktor Pylypyshyn	8.17	11	+5
Kyiv Public Asset	Oleksandr Pabat	5.95	8	+1
Party of Regions	Vasyl Horbal	3.95	6	−3
Katerynchuk Bloc	Mykola Katerynchuk	3.47	5	New
This lists parties that won seats. See the complete results below.
Secretary before	Secretary after
Oles Dovgiy; Chernovetskyi Bloc	Oles Dovgiy; Chernovetskyi Bloc

Snap mayoral and city council elections were held in Kyiv on 25 May 2008. The election, originally scheduled to be held alongside nationwide 2010 local elections, was called by the Verkhovna Rada by a 246–5 vote on March 18 amid corruption allegations involving the incumbent Mayor Leonid Chernovetskyi. The local election determined the new Mayor of Kyiv, as well as the composition of the 120-seat Kyiv City Council.

The Ukrainian parliament assigned the job of determining the election costs to the Central Election Commission of Ukraine, working in partnership with the Kyiv City Territorial Election Commission. The Kyiv CTEC designated March 26 as the date for the start of election campaigning.

In all, seven parties and blocs passed the 3% threshold needed to gain seats in the Kyiv City Council. The incumbent Leonid Chernovetskyi was officially declared the winner of the mayoral election on May 31. Yurii Lozovskyi, Secretary of the Kyiv CTEC, said that the voter turnout was estimated at 53-54%. The electoral commission said that the elections were largely clear and fair without any major incidents, but that the largest electoral violation was voter shopping.

Although, legally, next Kyiv local elections had to take place in 2013, eventually they were postponed and took place on 25 May 2014 as a part of the 2014 Ukrainian local elections.

== Candidates, parties, and blocs ==
In all, seventy-nine candidates were registered by the Kyiv Territorial Electoral Commission for the upcoming mayoral election. Candidates from some of the main political parties included:

- the incumbent Mayor Leonid Chernovetskyi, from the Christian Liberal Party of Ukraine. He was facing allegations of corruption and illegal privatization of Kyiv territories,
- Vitaliy Klychko, a politician in the Kyiv City Council and former heavyweight boxer,
- Oleh Tyahnybok, from the All-Ukrainian Union "Freedom",
- Vladyslav Kaskyv, from the Civil Party "PORA";
- Vice-Prime Minister Oleksandr Turchynov, from the Yulia Tymoshenko Bloc and the Our Ukraine–People's Self-Defense Bloc;
- Vasyl Horbal, from the Party of Regions;

A total of 37 parties and blocs participated in the Kyiv City Council election. These included both national (e.g. Yulia Tymoshenko Bloc, Our Ukraine) and local political parties (e.g. Leonid Chernovetskyi Bloc).

== Opinion polling ==
According to a telephone poll conducted prior to the election by the Razumkov Centre, 25.2% of the respondents said they would support Vitaliy Klychko for the position of mayor, 24.9% support Mayor Leonid Chernovetskyi, 10% support the former city mayor Oleksandr Omelchenko, 6% support current Vice-Prime Minister Oleksandr Turchynov, and 5.4% said they support the Minister of Internal Affairs Yuriy Lutsenko.

A different poll conducted by the Center of Political and Marketing Studies Sotsis, showed that 22.8% of the respondents support the incumbent mayor, 22% support Vitaliy Klychko, 11.5% support Oleksandr Omelchenko, 6.3% support Verkhovna Rada Deputy Mykola Tomenko, and 5.7% support Yuriy Lutsenko.

== Results ==
=== Mayoral election ===
Candidate	Party	Votes	%
Leonid Chernovetskyi	Leonid Chernovetskyi Bloc	431,561	37.77
Oleksandr Turchynov	Yulia Tymoshenko Bloc	218,670	19.14
Vitali Klitschko	Vitali Klitschko Bloc	205,316	17.97
Viktor Pylypyshyn	Lytvyn Bloc	76,801	6.72
Mykola Katerynchuk	Mykola Katerynchuk Bloc	50,719	4.44
Oleksandr Omelchenko	Oleksandr Omelchenko Bloc	28,876	2.53
Vasyl Horbal	Party of Regions	26,635	2.33
Oleh Tyahnybok	Svoboda	15,608	1.37
Oleksandr Pabat	Kyiv Public Asset	15,527	1.36
Others (<1%)		24,418	2.14
None of the above		48,605	4.25
Total		1,142,736	100.00
Valid votes		1,142,736	98.11
Invalid/blank votes		22,042	1.89
Total votes		1,164,778	100.00
Registered voters/turnout		2,146,213	54.27
Source: KCTEC

=== City Council election ===
Party	Votes	%	Seats	+/–
Leonid Chernovetskyi Bloc	350,680	30.45	43	+22
Yulia Tymoshenko Bloc	262,499	22.79	32	-9
Vitali Klitschko Bloc	122,243	10.62	15	+1
Lytvyn Bloc	94,084	8.17	11	+5
Kyiv Public Asset	68,548	5.95	8	+1
Party of Regions	45,491	3.95	6	-3
Mykola Katerynchuk Bloc	39,973	3.47	5	New
Oleksandr Omelchenko Bloc	26,004	2.26	0	New
Communist Party of Ukraine	25,784	2.24	0	0
Svoboda	23,971	2.08	0	0
Our Ukraine–People's Self-Defense Bloc	23,202	2.01	0	-15
Mykhailo Brodskyi Bloc "Kyivans"	7,736	0.67	0	New
Socialist Party of Ukraine	3,318	0.29	0	-7
Ukrainian People's Party	2,884	0.25	0	0
Party of Greens of Ukraine	2,442	0.21	0	0
Party of Small and Medium-sized Businesses of Ukraine	2,342	0.20	0	0
People's Democratic Party	2,091	0.18	0	0
PORA!	1,945	0.17	0	-14 (Note: Ran together with Reforms and Order Party in 2006, within Vitali Klitschko Bloc, winning 14 seats)
Agrarian Party of Ukraine	1,244	0.11	0	New
Green Party of Ukraine	1,034	0.09	0	0
Others (<1000 votes)	8,840	0.77	–	–
None of the above	35,233	3.06	–	–
Total	1,151,588	100.00	120	–
Valid votes	1,151,588	98.87		
Invalid/blank votes	13,114	1.13		
Total votes	1,164,702	100.00		
Registered voters/turnout	2,146,213	54.27		
Source: KCTEC

== Aftermath ==
=== Calls for another snap election ===
On 12 December 2008 Prime Minister Yulia Tymoshenko announced at a news briefing that she was confident that early mayoral elections would be held again in Kyiv. Day before, the Kyivenerho utility company began cutting the supply of hot water to about 5,000 homes in Kyivbecause of the Kyiv State City Administration's failure to compensate the company for the difference between the tariffs charged by Kyivenerho and the actual cost of its services. Following the event, Tymoshenko accused Mayor Leonid Chernovetskyi of using money from the local budget to finance his election campaign.

On 6 February 2009, the Vitali Klitschko Bloc stated it will apply to the Verkhovna Rada, the Cabinet of Ministers, the National Security and Defense Council and the Kyiv Prosecutor's Office with a request to take into consideration the unlawfulness of Chernovetskyi's actions and to call another snap mayoral elections in the city.

In the January 2010 Verkhovna Rada Chairman Volodymyr Lytvyn stated he started preparing a law draft to conduct an early mayoral election in Kyiv on 30 May 2010, alongside city council election. Lytvyn said that he "could not stand what was going on in Kyiv any longer" and that his own Lytvyn Bloc would take part in the election. A resolution setting another snap election in the capital city for the 30 May 2010 was registered in the Verkhovna Rada on 18 January, but was never included in the agenda, being later withdrawn on 16 February.

After then-incumbent Mayor Chernovetskyi had tendered his resignation on 1 June 2012, a petition to the parliament calling to hold an early mayoral election in the city was initiated. Although, it looked that the next Kyiv local election was set for 2012 nevertheless; However, by the January 2013 the Verkhovna Rada had set no date for these elections. Legally they had to take place in 2013, but in May 2013 the Constitutional Court of Ukraine has set the date of the election to 25 October 2015.

Eventually, regular elections for the position of Mayor and 120-seats Kyiv City Council took place on 25 May 2014 as a part of the nationwide 2014 local elections.

=== Faction changes since the elections ===
Severe changes occurred in the Kyiv City Council following 2008. By the September 2011, seven new factions had been created (2 of which included just 2 deputies, and another one had only 3 deputies). The winning bloc of the 2008 election, Leonid Chernovetskyi Bloc, disbanded itself on September 22, 2011, with all of its deputies later becoming non-partisan deputies in the city council. Such move has made UDAR (Vitali Klitschko Bloc until April 2011) the biggest faction with 12 deputies (3 deputies less compared to 2008 result), followed by the Party of Regions faction with 10 deputies (4 deputies more). Yulia Tymoshenko Bloc saw 22 deputies leaving the faction since the election.

In January 2013 the UDAR faction consisted of 13 deputies, while the Party of Regions faction had fallen down to 8 deputies. This made the People's Party faction the second biggest with 11 deputies. The Democratic Party of Ukraine faction contained 10 deputies. Yulia Tymoshenko Bloc had lost 1 more deputy and stood at the total of 9 deputies. Same as factions "Social Justice" and "Initiative". "Social Justice", "Initiative" and the faction of the Democratic Party of Ukraine were created in 2011. In June 2013 the People's Party faction contained 4 people. The other factions membership had stayed stable.

Following the 2008 election results, Yulia Tymoshenko (BYuT), Oleksandr Turchynov (BYuT), Mykola Tomenko (BYuT), Mykola Katerynchuk (BMK), Anatoliy Khostykoyev (BYuT), Stepan Chernovetskyi (BLCh) and Tetiana Donets (BYuT), gave up their seats due to the dual mandate rule. The next person in the party list becomes the city council deputy, when someone gives up their seat.

== See also ==
- Legal status and local government of Kyiv
- 2009 Ternopil Oblast local election
- 2010 Ukrainian local elections
