= Oleksandr Omelchenko =

Ukrainian politician (1938–2021)

Hero of Ukraine Oleksandr Omelchenko
- Олександр Омельченко
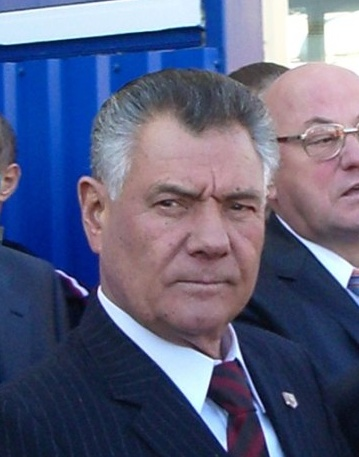
- Omelchenko in 2005

People's Deputy of Ukraine
- In office 30 September 2007 – 28 October 2012

Head of the Kyiv City State Administration
- In office 8 August 1996 – 20 April 2006
- Preceded by: Leonid Kosakivskyi
- Succeeded by: Leonid Chernovetskyi

Mayor of Kyiv
- In office 30 May 1999 – 14 April 2006
- Preceded by: Leonid Kosakivskyi
- Succeeded by: Leonid Chernovetskyi

Personal details
- Born: 9 August 1938 Zoziv, Lypovets Raion, Vinnytsia Oblast, Ukrainian SSR, Soviet Union
- Died: 25 November 2021 (aged 83) Kyiv, Ukraine
- Party: Unity of Oleksandr Omelchenko
- Other political affiliations: Our Ukraine–People's Self-Defense Bloc; Oleksandr Omelchenko Bloc
- Spouse: Lyudmyla
- Children: 2
- Education: Kyiv Civil Engineering Institute
- Awards: Honored Builder of Ukraine

Oleksandr Oleksandrovych Omelchenko (Ukrainian: Олександр Олександрович Омельченко; 9 August 1938 – 25 November 2021) was a Ukrainian politician who served as Mayor of Kyiv from 1999 to 2006. Omelchenko was also a People's Deputy of Ukraine from 2007 to 2012.

Omelchenko was the President of both the Association of the Cities of Ukraine and the Ice Hockey Federation of Ukraine (1997–2006). In 2001, he bought FC CSKA Kyiv from the Ministry of Defence and transformed it into FC Arsenal Kyiv.

Omelchenko died on 25 November 2021, aged 83, after being infected with COVID-19 which caused a lesion of the lungs. From 2014 until his death he was a member of the Kyiv City Council.

== Early life ==
Oleksandr Omelchenko was born on 9 August 1938, in Vinnytsia Oblast. His highest degree in the Soviet university education system was Candidate of Sciences. After graduation, Omelchenko worked at Kyivmiskbud, where he rose from worker to director of the plant of reinforced concrete structures.

He also became the chief engineer of the construction plant and the first deputy chairman of Kyivmiskbud. Omelchenko worked in Afghanistan during the Soviet–Afghan War in 1987–1989.

== Political career ==
After 1989, Omelchenko worked in the system of state construction, he was deputy chairman of the executive committee of the Kyiv City Council, and held the position of general director of Kyivrekonstruktsiya.

In 1994–1996, Omelchenko was the first deputy chairman of the Kyiv City State Administration. In August 1996, he headed this body.

== Mayor of Kyiv ==
During the 1999 Kyiv mayoral election, Omelchenko defeated noted oligarch Hryhoriy Surkis, with 76 percent of the vote to Surkis's 16 percent. Omelchenko became the first elected mayor in Ukraine's modern history, with a platform highlighting his work in restoring much of Kyiv's historic buildings and renovating parts of downtown Kyiv.

On recordings, which were termed the "Second Cassette Scandal" (Note: After the original Cassette scandal.) and released in early January 2002, Omelchenko demonstrably urged Viktor Yushchenko to have the Yushchenko-led Our Ukraine bloc and the Omelchenko-led Unity bloc oust Viktor Medvedchuk as first vice speaker of the Rada. On 13 December 2001, Medvedchuk was ousted. The recordings revealed that Omelchenko virulently opposed Medvedchuk and the Medvedchuk led SDPU(o), which supported Leonid Kuchma.

Omelchenko was a candidate in the 2004 Ukrainian presidential election, nominated by the Unity Party, which he formerly chaired. Omelchenko was the only candidate for President whose son was a deputy in the Verkhovna Rada. His program included the urgent withdrawal of Ukrainian forces from Iraq. In the election, he received 0.48% of the vote.

While he was running for a third term as Mayor of Kyiv in what was expected to be an easy victory in the March 2006 election, he was soundly defeated, with 21% of the votes behind elected mayor Leonid Chernovetskyi and Vitali Klitschko, who would himself later become mayor of Kyiv.

== Later political career ==
During the 2007 Ukrainian parliamentary election, Omelchenko was elected as an Our Ukraine–People's Self-Defense Bloc deputy to the Verkhovna Rada. However, he was expelled from the party in September 2011 due to his support of the Azarov Government. Omelchenko proceeded to voluntarily leave the faction the next month. Omelchenko's son, also named Oleksandr, was also a member of the Verkhovna Rada on an Our Ukraine ticket from 2002 until 2007.

During the 2008 Kyiv local election, Omelchenko was again a candidate for the post of Mayor of Kyiv, but he only garnered 2.53% of the vote, placing sixth behind incumbent mayor Leonid Chernovetskyi. His Oleksandr Omelchenko Bloc won only 2.26% of the vote, and no seats in the Kyiv City Council.

In the 2012 parliamentary elections, Omelchenko at first intended to attempt to be re-elected into parliament in single-member districts number 220 situated in Kyiv; but he withdrew from the elections.

During the 2014 Kyiv local election, Omelchenko was again a candidate for the post of Mayor of Kyiv, again as a candidate of the Unity Party. He finished 4th in this election with 6.1% of the votes (winner Vitali Klitschko received 56.7%). Unity won 3.3% of the votes and 2 seats in the Kyiv City Council; including a seat for Omelchenko.

Omelchenko did not participate in the 2014 Ukrainian parliamentary election.

In the 2019 Ukrainian parliamentary election, Omelchenko was a candidate of the Unity Party in single-member district No. 220, located in Kyiv. He took the fifth place in his constituency, gaining 8.28% of the vote.

In the 2020 Kyiv local elections, Omelchenko was again candidate for mayor of Kyiv, nominated by Unity of Oleksandr Omelchenko. In this election, the party was the third most popular party of Kyiv, winning 14 seats, and Omelchenko returned to the Kyiv City Council. However, he lost the mayoral election to Vitali Klitschko with 50.52% of the votes. Omelchenko finished in eighth place.

== Death ==
On 18 November 2021, Omelchenko was admitted to hospital after being infected with COVID-19 that had caused a lesion of the lungs. Omelchenko died on 25 November 2021, aged 83.

== Honours and awards ==
- Hero of Ukraine (21 August 2001) for outstanding personal contribution to the Ukrainian state in the socio-economic and cultural development of the capital of Ukraine
- Order of the Badge of Honour (1982)
- Order of the Red Banner of Labour (1986)
- Order of Prince Yaroslav the Wise, 3rd (2006), 4th (1999) and 5th (1998) classes
- Honour of the President of Ukraine (1996)
- Honored Builder of Ukraine
- Knight Commander, Order of St. Gregory the Great (2001)
- Honorary doctorate of Kyiv-Mohyla Academy (2001)

== See also ==
- Legal status and local government of Kyiv
- List of mayors of Kyiv

== Notes ==
Political offices
Preceded by Leonid Kosakivsky (as Speaker of Kyiv City Council – Head of the Kyiv City State Administration)	Mayor of Kyiv; 1999–2006	Succeeded by Leonid Chernovetsky
Preceded by Leonid Kosakivsky (as Speaker of Kyiv City Council – Head of the Kyiv City State Administration)	Head of the Kyiv City State Administration; 1996–2006	Succeeded by Leonid Chernovetsky
Sporting positions
Preceded by Anatoli Khorozov	Presidents of FHU; 1997–2006	Succeeded by Anatoliy Brezvin
