= Yaroslav Dubnevych =

Politician

- Ярослав Васильович Дубневич
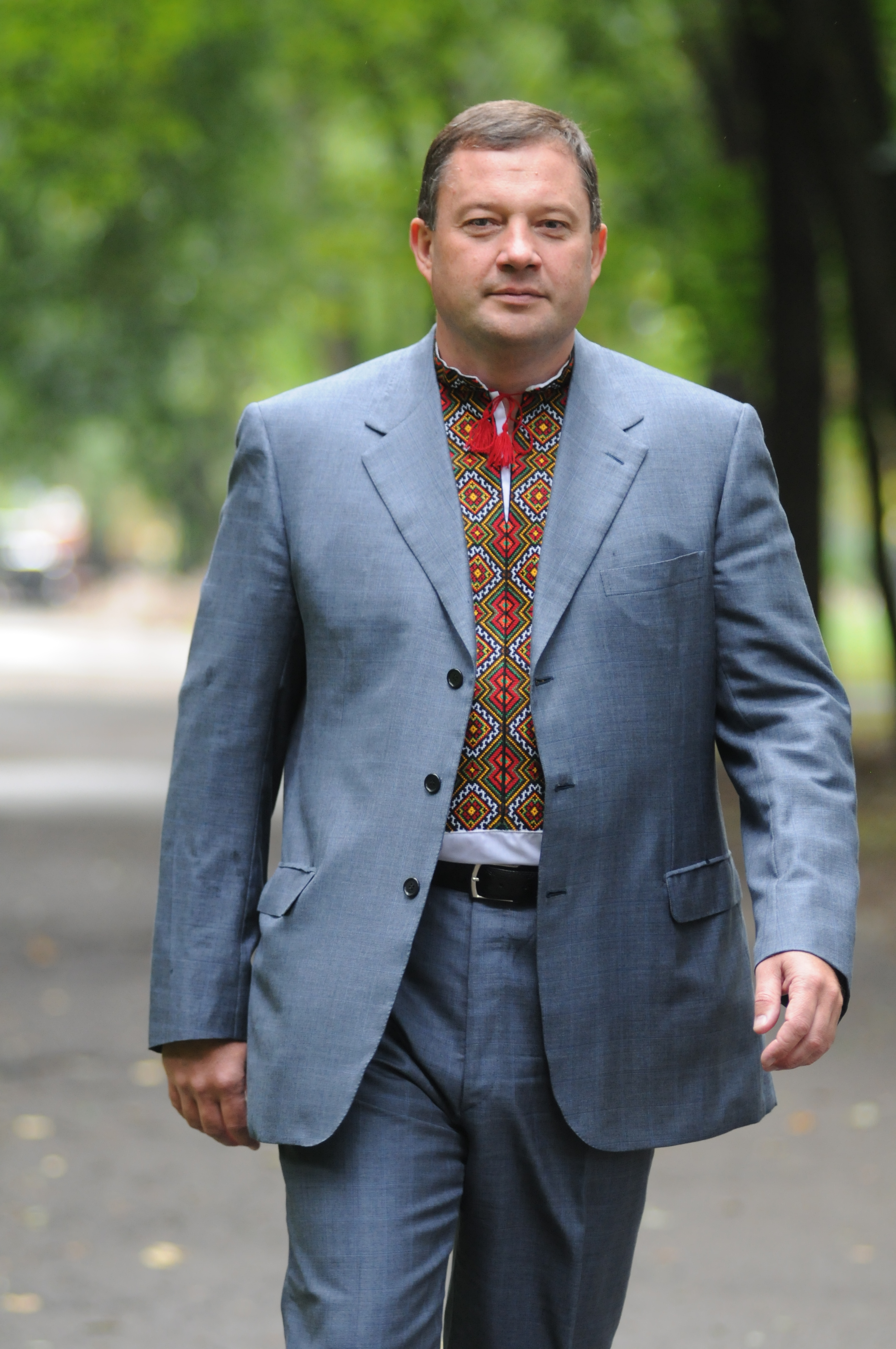
- Dubnevych in 2010

People's Deputy of Ukraine
- Incumbent
- Assumed office 12 December 2012
- Preceded by: Constituency established
- Constituency: Lviv Oblast, No. 120

Personal details
- Born: Yaroslav Vasylyovych Dubnevych; August 7, 1969 (age 56) Zubra, Lviv Oblast, Soviet Union (now Ukraine)
- Party: independent
- Other political affiliations: Poroshenko Bloc
- Occupation: Businessman, politician

Yaroslav Vasylyovych Dubnevych (Ukrainian: Ярослав Васильович Дубневич; born 7 August 1969) is a Ukrainian politician. He serves as People's Deputy of the Verkhovna Rada (Ukraine's national parliament) elected in the 2012, 2014 and 2019 Ukrainian parliamentary election.

After the 2012 he joined the UDAR faction. Between 2014 and 2019 he was a member of the Poroshenko Bloc faction. Following the 2019 election he joined the For the Future parliamentary faction.

In November 2023 an international arrested warrant was issued against Dubnevych on corruption charges. His current whereabouts are unknown.

== Biography ==
In the 2006 and 2010 Ukrainian local elections Dubnevych was elected into the Lviv Oblast Council; for Revival in 2010 and in 2006 for Batkivshchyna.

Dubnevych took part in the 2012 Ukrainian parliamentary election in No. 120 situated in Lviv Oblast as an independent candidate. After being elected he joined the UDAR faction in parliament.

In the 2014 parliamentary election Dubnevych was reelected after he again won single-mandate constituency № 120, gaining 60.1% of the vote as a candidate of Petro Poroshenko Bloc. He was a member of the Petro Poroshenko Bloc parliamentary faction. On 4 December 2014, he headed the Verkhovna Rada (the official name of Ukraine's national parliament) Committee on Transport. He was a Member of the Inter-Parliamentary Relations Group with Hungary, Member of the Inter-Parliamentary Relations Group with Kuwait, Member of the Inter-Parliamentary Relations Group with Jordan, Member of the Inter-Parliamentary Relations Group with Indonesia. He was one of the initiators of the State Road Fund, the purpose of which was to create a mechanism for the distribution of financial revenues to repair roads. The relevant bill was passed by parliament in November 2016.

Dubnevych took part in the 2019 Ukrainian parliamentary election again in the same constituency No. 120 again as an independent candidate. After being elected he joined the For the Future faction in parliament. He became Member of the Committee on Nation Health, Health Care and Health Insurance.

The media repeatedly reported that commercial entities associated with Yaroslav Dubnevych and his brother Bohdan regularly win tenders for the supply of spare parts for the national railway company Ukrzaliznytsia. In 2016 alone, the state-owned company purchased goods worth about UAH 1 billion from them. Former Minister of Infrastructure Volodymyr Omelyan expressed doubts about their necessity.

In October 2019 Prosecutor General of Ukraine Ruslan Riaboshapka filed to National Anti-Corruption Bureau of Ukraine (NABU) and Specialized Anti-Corruption Prosecutor's Office (SAP) statements on bringing Dubnevych to criminal liability in the case of misappropriation of Ukrzaliznytsia. On 31 October 2019 parliament lifted his parliamentary immunity.

In September 2022 the High Anti-Corruption Court of Ukraine closed criminal case against Dubnevych for the seizure of Ukrzaliznytsia's assets.

In the 2020 Ukrainian local elections Dubnevych unsuccessfully tried to be elected into the Lviv Oblast Council heading the list of For the Future. For the Future did not win any seats.

In October 2023 NABU and SAP reported Dubnevych on suspicion of organizing a scheme to steal natural gas worth 2.1 billion Ukrainian Hryvnia. NABU ordered Dubnevych arrest. On 2 November 2023 Dubnevych had agreed to attend a meeting with the High Anti-Corruption Court of Ukraine, but he did not show up. Following this the court issued an international arrest warrant for Dubnevych. Europol informed the Ukrainian authorities that he on 8 October 2023 had crossed the Romanian border with Hungary.
