= Unity of Oleksandr Omelchenko =

Unity of Oleksandr Omelchenko Єдності Олександра Омельченка
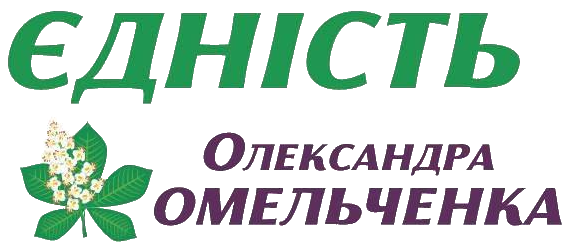
- Founded: October 16, 1999
- Headquarters: Kyiv
- Colours: Green, Purple
- Kyiv City Council: 14 / 120

Unity of Oleksandr Omelchenko (Ukrainian: Єдність Олександра Омельченка, romanized: Yednist Oleksandra Omelchenka), prior to 2020 Unity (Ukrainian: Єдність, romanized: Yednist) is a political party in Ukraine created in 1999 as a protest party. The party was led by the former mayor of Kyiv Oleksandr Omelchenko although in early 2008, he temporally halted his party membership in favor of a membership of Our Ukraine-Peoples Self Defence. Omelchenko died on November 25, 2021.

Prior to the 2020 Kyiv local election the party changed its name to its current name. In this election the party was the third most popular party of Kyiv, winning 14 seats.

== History ==
The original logo of the Unity Party

The party (then called) Unity supported Yevhen Marchuk in the 1999 Ukrainian presidential election. Marchuk took only the 5th place out of 13, while gaining 8.13% of the vote in the first round.

In 2001 a parliamentary faction called "Unity" was formed in the Verkhovna Rada (Ukraine's parliament), which included 21 MPs.

=== Ukrainian parliamentary election, 2002 ===
At the 2002 legislative elections, it was part of an alliance (also called Unity) that won 1.1% of the popular vote and 4 out of 450 seats.

The alliance consisted of:

- Unity
- Social Democratic Union (Social-Demokratyčnyj Sojuz)
- Young Ukraine (Moloda Ukrajina)
- Ukrainian Party of Justice – Union of Veterans, Handicapped, Chornobilians, Afghans (Ukrajins'ka Partija Spravedlivosti – Sojuz Veteraniv, Invalidiv, Čornobil'civ, Afganciv)

=== Ukrainian parliamentary election, 2006 ===
During the 2006 parliamentary elections the party was part of an electoral alliance led by Yevhen Marchuk (Electoral Bloc "Yevhen Marchuk – "Unity") which didn't make it into parliament winning only 0.06% of the votes.

The alliance consisted of:

- Unity
- Party of Freedom
- Party "Solidarity of Women of Ukraine"

=== Ukrainian parliamentary election, 2007 ===
The party did not run during the 2007 elections but advised its voters to vote for Forward, Ukraine! or Peoples Self-defence.

=== Since 2010, transformation into a local party ===
In the 2010 local elections Unity won 22 representatives in the Vinnytsia Oblast Council (regional parliaments of Vinnytsia Oblast).

During the 2014 Kyiv local election Unity won 3.3% of the votes and 2 seats in the Kyiv City Council; including a seat for Omelchenko. 15 deputies of the party were elected to the Kyiv City Council in the 2015 Kyiv local election. In other Ukrainian city councils across the country Unity gained 28 seats in the 2015 Ukrainian local elections.

In the 2019 Ukrainian parliamentary election Unity nominated three candidates, all in constituencies located in Kyiv. None won a parliamentary seat. Omelchenko took the 5th place in his constituency, gaining a little more than 8%.

Prior to the 2020 Kyiv local election the party changed its name to Unity of Oleksandr Omelchenko. In this election the party won 14 seats, and took third place. Omelchenko again was a member of the Kyiv City Council, until he died on November 25, 2021.

== Election results ==
=== Verkhovna Rada ===
Year	Popular vote	Percentage	Overall seats	Change	Government	Remarks
2001	formed at the first session of parliament		21 / 450	▲21		as "Unity"
2002	12,027	1.09	4 / 450	▲4		as "Unity"

=== Kyiv City Council ===
Year	Popular vote	Percentage	Overall seats	Change	Government
2014	43,788	3.32	2 / 120	▲2	
2015	67,480	7.81	15 / 120	▲13	
2020	60,496	8.74	14 / 120	▼1	
