= Leonid Chernovetskyi Bloc =

Leonid Chernovetskyi Bloc Блок Леоніда Черновецького
- Leader: Leonid Chernovetskyi
- Founded: 12 February 2006
- Dissolved: 22 September 2011
- Headquarters: Kyiv
- Ideology: Kyiv regionalism Christian democracy
- Political position: Centre-right
- Colours: Yellow; Red; Green

Website
- blch.kiev.ua

Leonid Chernovetskyi Bloc (Ukrainian: Блок Леоніда Черновецького) was a regional electoral alliance supporting then–people's deputy and since 2006, the Mayor of Kyiv Leonid Chernovetskyi.

== History ==
=== 2006 Kyiv local election ===
Formed as an alliance based around Chernovetskyi's Christian Liberal Party (Ukrainian: Християнсько-ліберальна партія України), the bloc's 120-candidate list was registered by the Kyiv City Territorial Electoral Commission on 12 February 2006, rallying around Leonid Chernovetskyi's personality. In a big electoral surprise, the bloc has finished second with 12.94% of the vote, falling just 12 points behind Yulia Tymoshenko Bloc and 4 points ahead of Our Ukraine, on the list of which Chernovetskyi ran in the national election the same day. Chernovetskyi himself won the mayoral election in another surprise that evening, winning over 31% of the vote, 8 points ahead of then–favourite to win the position, Vitali Klitschko.

=== 2008 Kyiv local election ===
Following the Verkhovna Rada decision to dissolve Kyiv City Council and to hold a snap general election in the city, Chernovetskyi and his team expanded the bloc and allied with the Green Planet and Women of Ukraine parties to run in the 2008 election. Despite polls showing high disapproval for the incumbent mayor, Chernovetskyi was successfully re-elected with 38% of the vote, while his bloc won the election in a landslide, receiving over 30% of the vote and 43 seats, gaining 22 deputies in the city council.

Although the bloc intended to run nationally in the 2012 parliamentary election, on 22 September 2011 the bloc's faction in Kyiv City Council was dissolved. All the deputies that were members of the faction became independents.

== Membership ==
Party			Leader
Christian Liberal Party of Ukraine; Християнсько-ліберальна партія України	ChLPU; ХЛПУ	Christian democracy	Leonid Chernovetskyi
Green Planet; Зелена планета	ZP; ЗП	Green politics	Nataliia Zubrytska
Women of Ukraine; Жінки України	ZhU; ЖУ	Feminism	Tamara Fedotova
Christian Democratic Party of Ukraine (Note: Joined on the 23 October 2008); Християнсько-демократична партія України	ChDPU; ХДПУ	Christian democracy	Kyrylo Polishchuk
