= Christian Liberal Party of Ukraine =

Political party in Ukraine

Christian Liberal Party of Ukraine is a political party in Ukraine. The party says that it is guided by the values of Christianity and the principles of Western European democracy: parliamentarism, the market economy, free labour and powerful social programs. The party is led by the former Mayor of Kyiv, Leonid Chernovetskyi.

In 2006 the party participated in national elections as part of the Block of People's Democratic Parties. At the Kyiv City Council election, 2008 the party was part of the Leonid Chernovetskyi Bloc alliance. It has never competed alone in national elections. The party planned to compete in the 2012 Ukrainian parliamentary election also as a member of the Leonid Chernovetskyi Bloc, but this alliance disbanded itself in the Kyiv City Council on September 22, 2011.

== See also ==
- Politics of Ukraine
- List of national leaders
