= Mykola Katerynchuk Bloc =

Mykola Katerynchuk Bloc Блок Миколи Катеринчука
- Leader: Mykola Katerynchuk
- Headquarters: Kyiv
- International affiliation: None
- Colours: Blue

Website
- http://www.katerynchuk.com

Mykola Katerynchuk Bloc (Ukrainian: Блок Миколи Катеринчука) was a local electoral bloc of parties in the capital of Ukraine, Kyiv. It was led by Mykola Katerynchuk who is chairman of the European Party of Ukraine and deputy of the Ukrainian Parliament. During the 2008 local election the party won 3.47% of the votes and 5 seats in the Kyiv City Council, but after the party dismissed 3 members the party was represented by only 2 deputies in November 2008. The faction was eliminated by its remaining members in June 2013.

== History ==
The party was formed when the European Party of Ukraine and European Platform decided to take part in the snap Kyiv local election of 2008 not as a part of Our Ukraine (who won 2% of the votes and no seats), but as the Mykola Katerynchuk Bloc.

After 3 deputies of the party voted to elect Oles Dovhyi as the secretary of the Kyiv city council (June 10, 2008) although the position of the bloc was against the election of Dovhy the party the Mykola Katerynchuk Bloc deprived all 5 deputies. In June, the Solomianskyi district court of Kyiv said that the 3 deputies who voted for Oles Dovhyid could not act in the council on behalf of the bloc.

In November 2008 the Katerynchuk Bloc decided to reinstate the two deputies of the city council of the bloc who didn't take part in the voting of the secretary of the Kyiv city council.

On 3 June 2013 the faction was eliminated by its remaining members.
