= Roman Romanyuk =

Ukrainian politician

- Роман Романюк
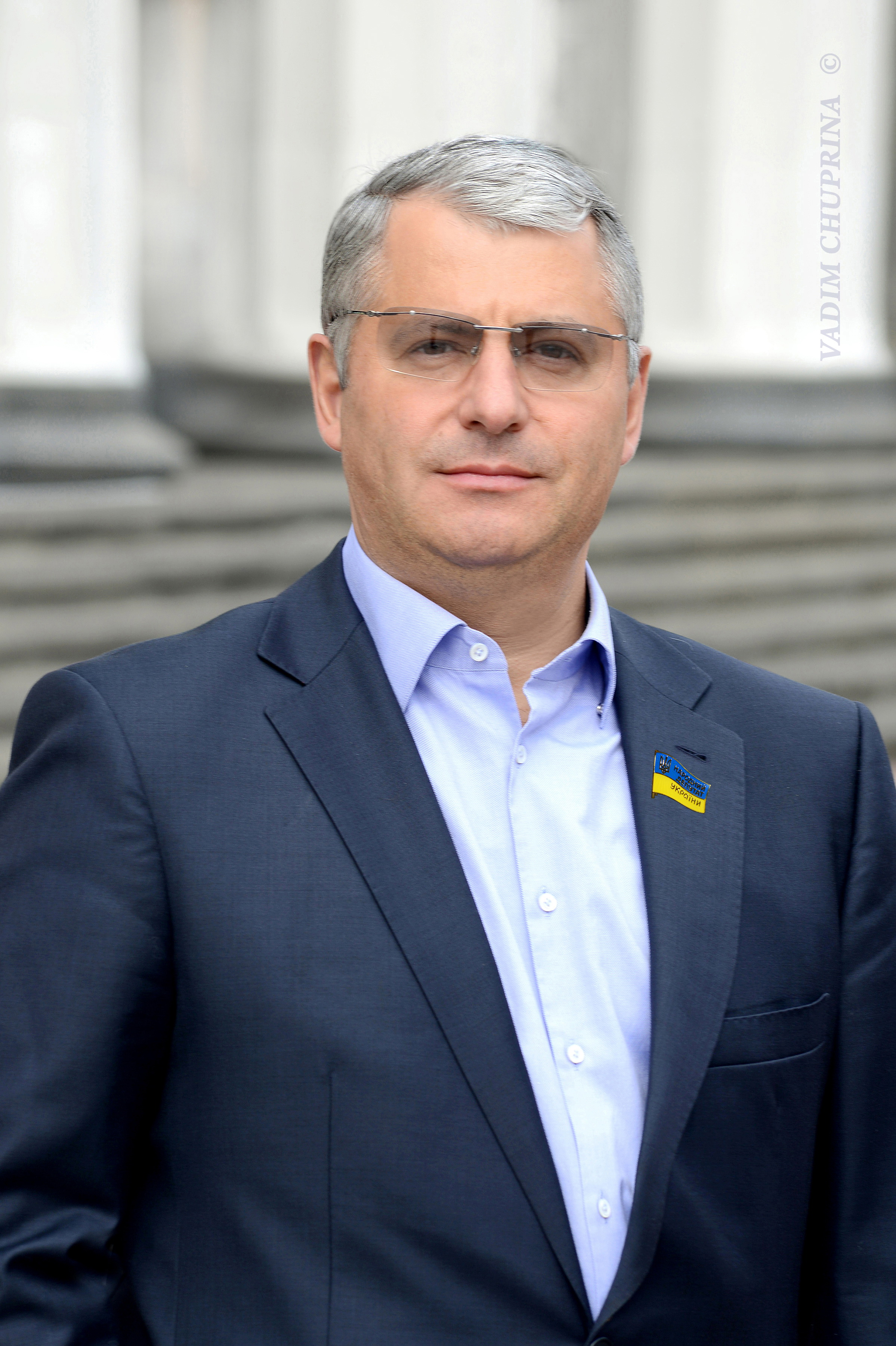
- Romanyuk in 2015

People's Deputy of Ukraine
- In office 27 November 2014 – 24 July 2019

Personal details
- Born: 18 October 1961 (age 64) Chernivtsi, Chernivtsi Oblast, Ukrainian SSR, Soviet Union
- Party: Petro Poroshenko Bloc

Roman Serhiyovych Romanyuk (Ukrainian: Роман Сергійович Романюк; born 18 October 1961) is a Ukrainian politician. He was a People's Deputy of Ukraine of the VII, VIII convocations of the Verkhovna Rada.

== Bibliography ==
He was born on 18 October 1961 in Chernivtsi. In early he stayed alone without parents that is why appeared to be in asylum "The House of orphans", and later on in children's home "Romashka". Secondary education he got in boarding school. After that he entered technical college No. 2 (Chernivtsi) where he got a profession of the wireman of electric and radio equipment.

From 1980 to 1982, he served in the Soviet Army.

In 1988, he graduated from law faculty of Taras Shevchenko National University of Kyiv on specialty "Law". He worked in organs of state authority and organs of local management in Kyiv:

- From 1997 to 2007, he is a deputy manager, a manager of interaction management with courts, law enforcement agencies and law enforcement agency of Kyiv City State Administration.
- In 2004, he graduated from National Academy for Public Administration under the President of Ukraine and got a qualification «Master of State Management».
- Since 2007 he is the chairman of the executive board of the Charity organization «Fund of law enforcement agencies of the capital».
- From 2008 to 2012, he was elected a depute of Kyiv City Council of the 6th convocation; was a member of the committee on the questions of law and order, rules of procedure and deputy's ethics.
- From 2009 to 2010, he is a chairman of political party "Nova Kraina".
- From 2012, he was elected a people's depute of Ukraine of the 7th convocation; post – a deputy manager of the Verkhovna Rada's of Ukraine Committee on the questions of the supremacy of law and right.

At the snap elections to the Verkhovna Rada he was elected the people's deputy of Ukraine for the second time of the VIII convocation, on general state multi-mandate constituency of the party Petro Poroshenko Bloc<ref, number in the list is 25. A member of deputy's fraction of the party "Petro Poroshenko Blok", a post – a chairman of subcommittee on the questions of legal status of the High Council of Justice, High Judicial Qualifications Commission of judges of Ukraine in the Verkhovna Rada on the questions of law policy and right.

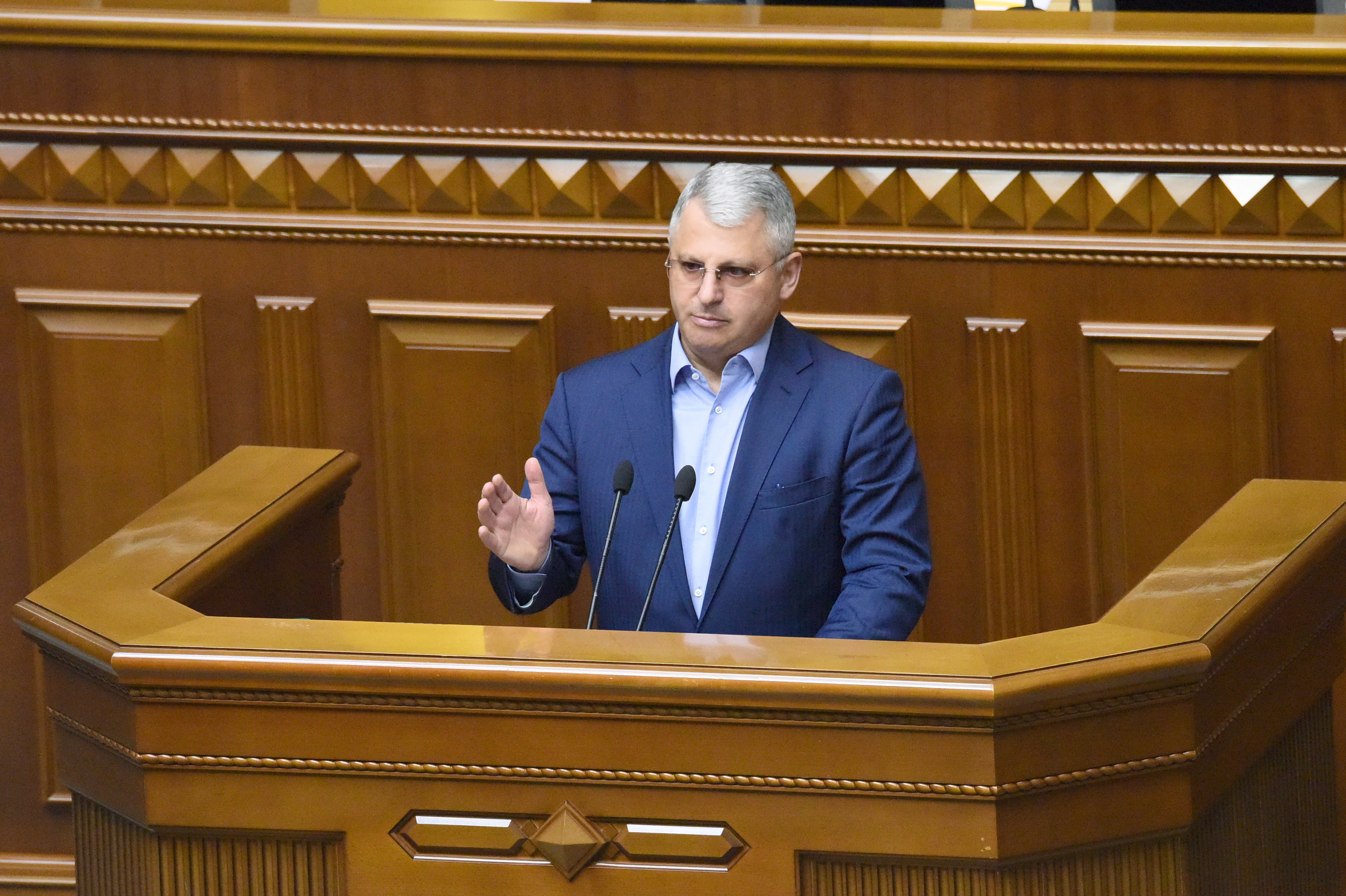
Romanyuk speaking in the Verkhovna Rada in 2018

Romanyuk is a candidate (number 6 on the election list) for the Kyiv City Council of the party UDAR in the 2020 Kyiv local election set for 25 October 2020.

== Family ==
Romanyuk is married, and has a daughter.

== Orders ==
- Honoured Lawyer of Ukraine;
- Certificate of Appreciation of the Ukraine's Cabinet of Ministers
- Departmental orders of Ministry of Internal Affairs of Ukraine, National Security Agency of Ukraine, General Prosecutor Office of Ukraine, Tax Administration of Ukraine;
- The Order of the St. Equal to the Apostles Knight Volodymyr of the III, II class;
- Order of St. Andrew.
