= Oles Dovgiy =

Ukrainian former politician

- Олесь Довгий
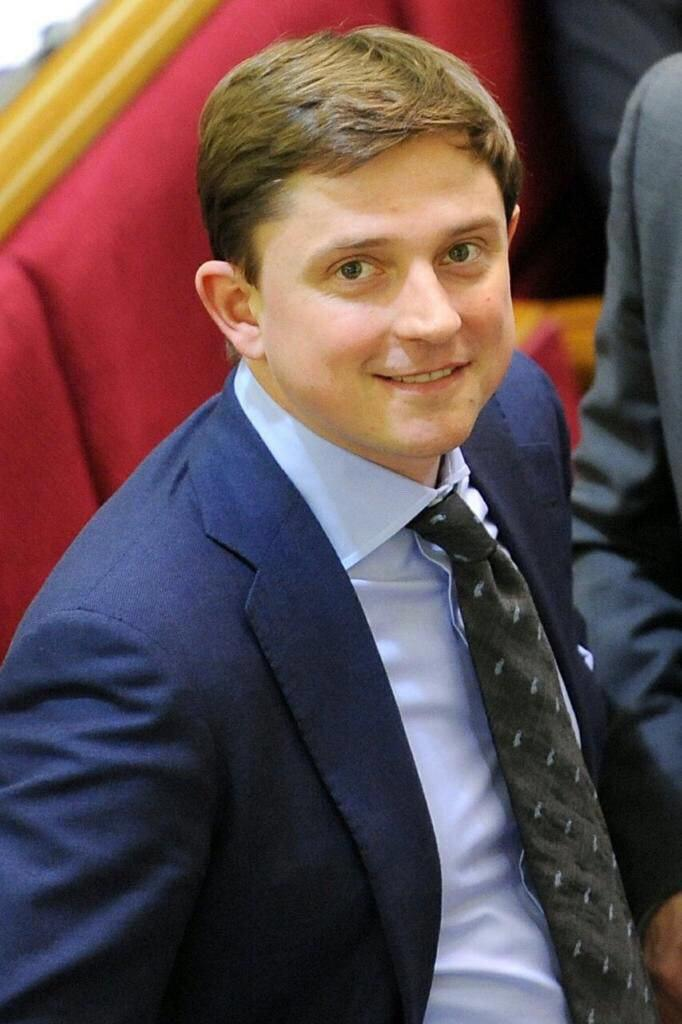

People's Deputy of Ukraine
- In office 27 November 2014 – 18 June 2025
- Preceded by: Oleksandr Yedin
- Constituency: Kirovohrad Oblast, No. 102

Personal details
- Born: 1 November 1980 (age 45) Kyiv, Ukrainian SSR, Soviet Union
- Party: Independent
- Other political affiliations: People's Will
- Education: Kyiv National Economic University
- Awards: Order of Merit
- Website: oles.ua

Oles Stanislavovych Dovgiy (Ukrainian: Оле́сь Станісла́вович До́вгий; born 1 November 1980) is a Ukrainian former politician who served as a People's Deputy of Ukraine from 2014 to 2025, representing Ukraine's 102nd electoral district in Kirovohrad Oblast. He was previously a member of the Kyiv City Council from 2006 to 2011.

== Early life ==
Oles Dovgiy was born 1 November 1980 in Kyiv to Stanislav Dovhyi, a scientist and politician who was a People's Deputy of Ukraine from 2002 to 2012. His mother, Larysa Dovha, is a professor at the National University of Kyiv-Mohyla Academy and a member of the National Academy of Sciences of Ukraine.

== Education ==
In 1997 he graduated with Honors from the regular school No. 58 in Kyiv.

Studied at the Anglo European School of English in Bournemouth (UK) under the international student exchange program. He graduated from the Economics and Business course at Kensington College of Business

In 2002 he graduated from Kyiv National Economic University with a degree in international economics and law with a degree in manufacturing marketing. In 2015 he graduated from the National University "Odesa Law Academy" with a degree in law.

In 2012-2014 he graduated from the МBА program for top-level managers at INSEAD – The Business School for the World. Holds a PhD in Economics.

== Professional career ==
Dovgiy started working in 1997 as a legal assistant at the Ukrainian Association of Young Lawyers. Starting 1998, he worked as an assistant to the head of the insurance company Credo Classic (now UNICA Ukraine). Oles was one of the managers of the Nova Records and Western Thunder group of companies and was the founder of the first Ukrainian DVD company. Along with his partners, he established one of the pioneering Ukrainian internet service providers and Synerhiya Company, the first company in the Ukrainian market to start selling advertising in movie theaters. Dovgiy and his partners founded the country's first online store selling audio and video content.

Among Dovgiy's early business projects was a joint publishing project with ABABAGALAMAGA Publishing House, which published and sold more than 5 million children's books of the Mini-Dyvo series. This was the biggest number of books in the history of Ukrainian book publishing.

According to his tax declaration, Oles Dovgiy made his first million dollars at the age of 21.

== Political career ==
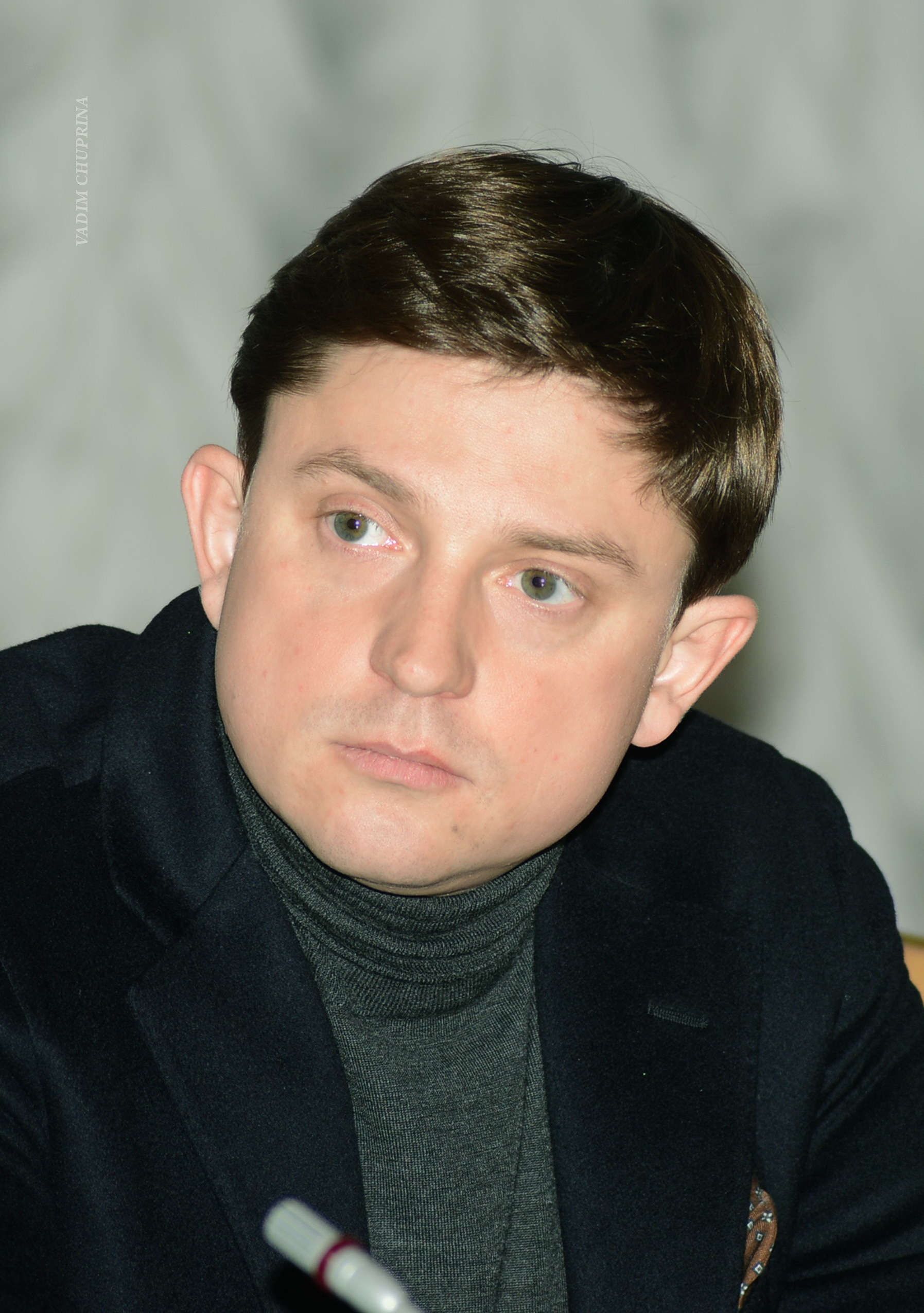
Oles Dovgiy in 2015

In the 2006 Ukrainian local elections Dovgiy was elected to Kyiv City Council, where he was later elected deputy chairman and Secretary of Kyiv City Council. In the 2008 snap elections to Kyiv City Council, he was re-elected as a council member and as deputy chairman and Secretary of Kyiv City Council for a second term. In 2011, Dovgiy resigned as Secretary of Kyiv City Council at his own request protesting against the policies of Viktor Yanukovych.

During the 2014 Ukrainian parliamentary election he was elected as a People's Deputy of Ukraine in Ukraine's 102nd electoral district, located in Kirovohrad Oblast.

On 18 September 2015, Dovgiy joined the People's Will parliamentary group. Dovgiy was close to President Petro Poroshenko, and frequently brought People's Will to support his initiatives while he was in office.

On 10 November 2016, Dovgiy was elected as official representative of industrialists, entrepreneurs and employers in the Verkhovna Rada (Ukrainian parliament). He also chaired the Office of Business Representatives. Later, his parliamentary immunity was lifted by the Rada on 11 July 2017 on suspicion of involvement in illegal allocations of land in Kyiv. The Specialized Anti-Corruption Prosecutor's Office closed the case against Oles Dovgiy and found the accusations baseless in December of that year.

On July 21, 2019, he was re-elected as a People's Deputy in the early parliamentary elections in electoral district No. 102 (Kirovohrad region).

Dovgiy resigned from the Verkhovna Rada and declared his intention to leave politics to focus on supporting the Armed Forces of Ukraine and social and cultural projects on 18 June 2025. At the time of leaving office, he was among the deputies that voted the least, missing 71% of votes.

== Awards ==
- Order of St. Andrew the Apostle, the First-Called, 1st class (September 2008).
- Order of Merit, 3rd class (Decree of the President of Ukraine of 28 May 2009).
- Order of Saint Nicholas the Wonderworker, from Metropolitan Epiphanius of Kyiv and All Ukraine (October 2020).

== Personal life ==
Oles is married and has sons Makarii and Matviy.
