= City with special status =

Type of first-level administrative division of Ukraine

A city with special status (Ukrainian: місто зі спеціальним статусом, romanized: misto zi spetsial'nym statusom), formerly a "city of republican subordinance", is a type of first-level administrative division of Ukraine.

Kyiv and Sevastopol are the only two such cities. Their administrative status is recognized in the Ukrainian Constitution in Chapter IX: Territorial Structure of Ukraine and they are governed in accordance with laws passed by Ukraine's parliament, the Verkhovna Rada.

== Overview ==
Although Kyiv is the nation's capital and its own administrative region, the city also serves as the administrative center for Kyiv Oblast (province). The oblast entirely surrounds the city. In addition, before 2020 Kyiv also served as the administrative center for the oblast's Kyiv-Sviatoshyn Raion (district).

Sevastopol is also administratively separate from the Autonomous Republic of Crimea, retaining its special status from Soviet times as a closed city, serving as a base for the former Soviet Black Sea Fleet. The city was home to the Ukrainian Navy as well as the Russian Black Sea Fleet, although since the Crimean crisis, both Crimea and Sevastopol were annexed by Russia as federal subjects, a move declared illegal by both the Ukrainian government and a majority of the international community.

== List of cities ==
ISO code	Name	Flag	Coat of arms	Status	Area	Population
UA-30	City of Kyiv	(Kyiv)	Coat of arms of Kyiv	Capital of Ukraine; Administrative center of Kyiv Oblast	839 km^{2} (323.9 sq mi)	2,950,819
UA-40	City of Sevastopol	(Sevastopol)	Coat of arms of Sevastopol	In 2014, annexed by Russia in violation of various treaties previously signed by Russia. Considered to be part of the "temporarily occupied territories of Ukraine" for Ukrainian legal purposes.	1,079 km^{2} (416.6 sq mi)	443,212

== See also ==
- List of cities in Ukraine
- Legal status and local government of Kyiv
- Gradonachalstvo
