= Vitali Klitschko Bloc =

Vitali Klitschko Bloc Блок Віталія Кличка
- Leader: Vitali Klitschko
- Founded: February 5, 2006 (as Vitali Klitschko Bloc "PORA–RRP"); April 8, 2008 (as Vitali Klitschko Bloc)
- Dissolved: February 16, 2011
- Succeeded by: Ukrainian Democratic Alliance for Reforms
- Headquarters: Kyiv
- Ideology: Kyiv regionalism Liberalism
- Political position: Centre-right
- Colors: Red

The Vitali Klitschko Bloc (Ukrainian: Блок Віталія Кличка) were two electoral blocs running in the 2006 and 2008 Kyiv local elections, respectively. Both blocs bore the name and were led by WBC heavyweight champion Vitali Klitschko.

== History ==
=== 2006 Kyiv local election ===
On 10 December 2005, PORA and Reforms and Order Party agreed to create an electoral alliance between the two to contest in the 2006 Ukrainian parliamentary election as Civic Bloc "PORA–RRP" (Ukrainian: Громадянський блок "ПОРА–ПРП"). Vitali Klitschko, who led the alliance in the national election, announced on 19 January 2006 that he would run for the Mayor of Kyiv and on 5 February 2006 he headed the PORA–RRP list to Kyiv City Council. Running for сity сouncil election, alliance list received the name of its lead candidate and mayoral candidate, contesting the 2006 local election as Vitali Klitschko Bloc PORA–RRP (Ukrainian: Блок Віталія Кличка "ПОРА–ПРП"), that would contend in the March 26, 2006 Kyiv City Council elections. In the election, bloc won a total of 14 seats and 8.51% votes. Klitschko, having lost the mayoral election, finishing second with 23,7% of the votes, soon became a deputy of the Kyiv City Council from the bloc list. The bloc felt apart very soon after the election.

=== 2008 Kyiv local election ===
Revived for the 2008 election the Vitali Klitschko Bloc consisted of Kyiv local organisations of People's Movement of Ukraine, European Capital and Ukrainian Social Democrats and won 10.61% of the votes and 15 seats in the Kyiv City Council. During the simultaneously held elections for Mayor of Kyiv Klitschko received 17.9 percent of votes.

On 14 October 2008 Klitschko announced that participation of his bloc in then-expected to be held snap 2008 Ukrainian parliamentary election was possible. He added that a decision on the participation in the race would be definitely taken by the entire team making up the bloc, not by him personally. European Party of Ukraine was named a possible expansion of the bloc to run in the next parliamentary election, but in the end, it was never finalised.

== Membership ==
=== Vitali Klitschko Bloc PORA–RRP ===
| Party | | Ideology | Leader |
|---|---|---|---|
| Civic Party "PORA!"; Громадянська партія "ПОРА!" | PORA! ПОРА! | Liberalism | Vladyslav Kaskiv |
| Reforms and Order Party; Партія «Реформи і порядок» | PRP; ПРП | Liberalism | Viktor Pynzenyk |

=== Vitali Klitschko Bloc ===
| Party | | | Leader |
|---|---|---|---|
| People's Movement of Ukraine; Народний рух України | NRU; НРУ | Conservatism | Borys Tarasyuk |
| European Capital; Європейська столиця | YeS; ЄС | Liberalism | Lev Partskhaladze |
| Ukrainian Social Democrats; Українські соціал-демократи | USD; УСД | Social democracy | Oleksandr Klius |

== Election results ==
=== Kyiv City Council ===
| Year | Votes | % | Seats | +/- | Government |
|---|---|---|---|---|---|
| 2006 | 122,432 | 8.5 (#4) | 14 / 120 | | Opposition |
| 2008 | 122,243 | 10.6 (#3) | 15 / 120 | ▲1 | Opposition |
