= Ukrainian Democratic Alliance for Reform =

Political party in Ukraine

Ukrainian Democratic Alliance for Reform of Vitali Klitschko Український демократичний альянс за реформи Віталія Кличка
- Leader: Vitali Klitschko
- Founded: 14 March 2005 (as European Capital); 24 April 2010 (as UDAR)
- Preceded by: European Capital; Vitali Klitschko Bloc
- Headquarters: Kyiv
- Youth wing: Youth Wing
- Women's wing: Women's Movement
- Ideology: Liberalism (Ukrainian); Civic nationalism; Pro-Europeanism
- Political position: Centre-right
- European affiliation: European People's Party (observer)
- Colours: Red
- Slogan: From personal success to the success of the country
- Verkhovna Rada: 0 / 450
- Regions: 186 / 43,122
- Kyiv City Council: 30 / 120

Election symbol

Party flag

Website
- udar.party

The Ukrainian Democratic Alliance for Reform of Vitali Klitschko (Ukrainian: Український демократичний альянс за реформи Віталія Кличка, romanized: Ukrainskyi demokratychnyi alians za reformy Vitaliia Klychka, using the acronym UDAR Vitali Klitschko (Ukrainian: УДАР) translates to "strike" or "punch", English: PUNCH of Vitali Klitschko) is a political party in Ukraine headed by retired Ukrainian professional heavyweight boxer Vitali Klitschko. The party has been an observer member of the European People's Party (EPP) since 2013.

The party's original name was Political Party "European Capital" (Ukrainian: Політична партія "Європейська столиця", Russian: Политическая партия "Европейская столица"), founded in March 2005 by businessman Lev Partshaladze. On 24 April 2010, it was renamed Ukrainian Democratic Alliance for Reform and elected boxer Vitali Klitschko as its leader, following its participation in the Vitali Klitschko Bloc (Ukrainian: Блок Віталія Кличка, Russian: Блок Виталия Кличко), during the 2008 Kyiv local election.

The party won 40 seats in the 2012 Ukrainian parliamentary election.

In the 2014 parliamentary election, 30% of the Petro Poroshenko Bloc election list was filled by members of UDAR (as non-partisan) and UDAR leader Klitschko topped that list. The Petro Poroshenko Bloc won the election with 132 seats. UDAR officially merged into the Petro Poroshenko Bloc on 28 August 2015.

In May 2019 Klitschko announced that UDAR would take part independently in the 2019 Ukrainian parliamentary election. In this election UDAR did compete as an independent party again, but only in 15 single-mandate constituencies and it failed to win any seats.

In the 2020 Kyiv local election UDAR won 30 of the 120 seats of the Kyiv City Council. In the same election Klitschko was reelected as Mayor of Kyiv with 50.52% of the votes.

== History ==
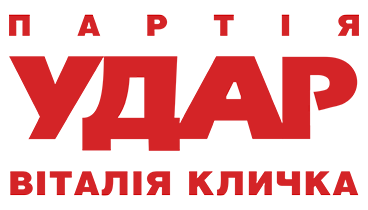
Former logo

=== Political Party "European Capital" ===
The Political Party "European Capital" was registered in March 2005 (its party-leader was Ukrainian businessman Lev Partshaladze) and the party gained 0.04% of the votes during the Ukrainian parliamentary elections 2006; the party did not participate in the 2007 Ukrainian parliamentary elections. In February 2009 the party renamed itself Political Party "New Country". Lev Partshaladze was elected into the Kyiv City Council for the Vitaliy Klychko Bloc in 2008, but expelled from the faction, for repeatedly voting differently from the faction, on 2 December 2010. (Note: In the 2014 Ukrainian parliamentary election Lev Partshaladze placed 93rd on the election list of Petro Poroshenko Bloc; 30% of this election list was filled by members of UDAR.)

=== Ukrainian Democratic Alliance for Reform ===
On a party congress on 24 April 2010, the party "New Country" (the name that "European Capital" had adopted 14 months earlier)) renamed itself once more to "Ukrainian Democratic Alliance for Reform" and elected boxer Vitali Klitschko as its leader. The party officially became Ukrainian Democratic Alliance for Reform (UDAR) of Vitali Klitschko mid-July 2010.

During the 2010 Ukrainian local elections the party won about 400 representatives in municipalities and Oblast Councils (regional parliaments).

The Bloc of Vitali Klitschko faction in the Kyiv City Council changed its name to UDAR of Vitali Klitschko in February 2011. The party has a strong popularity in Kyiv.

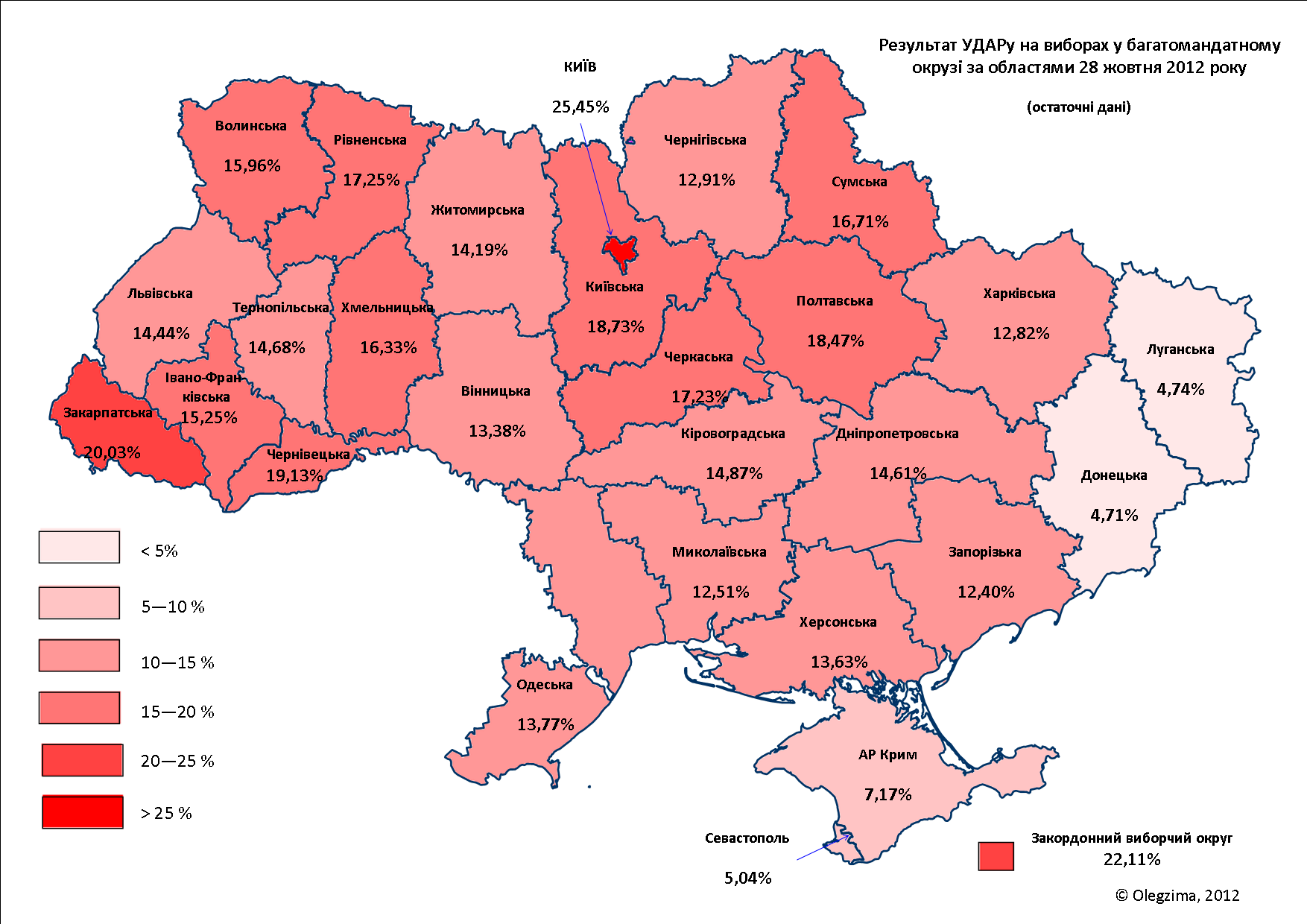
Results in the 2012 elections

In September 2011 party leader Klitschko stated that the party was considering the possibility of merging with other political parties before contending in the 2012 Ukrainian parliamentary elections. In December 2011 UDAR of Vitali Klitschko and Civil Position where negotiating a unification. But Civil Position eventionally joined Batkivshchyna during these elections.

UDAR became a partner of the Christian Democratic Union of Germany in November 2011. Udar is supported by the German government and the Konrad Adenauer Foundation and received support in particular from Angela Merkel and also politicians from the conservative European People's Party. According to information gained by the German magazine DER SPIEGEL, the target was to "set up Klitschko purposefully as a new strong man in Kiew - in order to counter this way the Kremlin's growing influence". Support consisted in logistics, training and joint performances. Assistance was also promised by Christoph Heusgen, Ronald Pofalla and Guido Westerwelle.

UDAR did not join the Dictatorship Resistance Committee; but on 22 January 2012 it did sign an agreement on joint actions with that alliance.

Starting in March 2010 the party's popularity in opinion polls reached a level almost twice as high as the election threshold (which was raised to 5% in November 2011). The election list of the party was a mixture of candidates who used to represent parties from all over the political spectrum of Ukraine.

After a successful application the European People's Party started on 5 April 2012 the process of making UDAR an observer member of the organization.

In July 2012 party leader Klychko stated that his party would not cooperate with the Party of Regions in a new parliament.

In early August 2012 the party complained its candidates for people's deputies (and all other parties not involved in the first Azarov Government) suffered "psychological and physical pressure" and this "ten times higher than other parties".

Two weeks before the 28 October 2012 Ukrainian parliamentary election UDAR withdrew 26 of its candidates running in single-member constituencies in favour of Batkivshchyna candidates and Batkivshchyna withdrew 26 parliamentary candidates in favor of UDAR in an attempt to maximise votes for the opposition. In the election the party won 13.97% of the national votes and 6 constituencies (it had competed in 183 of the 225 constituencies) and thus 40 parliamentary seats. Support for UDAR was the least diversified at the regional level compared with the results of the other leading parties. Independent candidates Yaroslav Dubnevych and Fedir Nehoi joined the UDAR parliamentary faction on 12 December 2012; the same day party leader Klitschko was elected to lead the party's faction. The party is coordinating its parliamentary activities with Batkivshchyna and Svoboda.

In late December 2012 UDAR and the United National Movement from Georgia signed a cooperation agreement.

In May 2013 UDAR, Batkivshchyna and Svoboda vowed to coordinate their actions during the 2015 Ukrainian presidential election.

On 6 September 2013 the party was granted "observer status" in the European People's Party. (Note: On 6 September 2013 the fellow Ukrainian party Our Ukraine was deprived of its "observer status" in the European People's Party.)

Party leader Klitschko confirmed on 28 February 2014 that he would take part in the 2014 Ukrainian presidential election(, this also ended the May 2013 agreement to coordinate with Batkivshchyna and Svoboda). But on 29 March 2014 announced that he had changed his mind and would run for the post of Mayor of Kyiv in the 2014 Kyiv local election (including Mayoral elections) set for 25 May 2014. In the 2014 Ukrainian presidential election Klitschko endorsed the candidacy of Petro Poroshenko. Klitschko won Kyiv's mayoral elections with almost 57% of the votes. Poroshenko was elected President of Ukraine on 25 May 2014. Klitschko was sworn in as Mayor on 5 June 2014. The same day the Ukrainian parliament had deprived Klitschko of his MP mandate (Ukrainian MPs are not entitled to combine parliamentary activities with any other public employment). Hence Vitaliy Kovalchuk was elected to lead the party's faction in parliament on 7 June 2014.

=== Merge into the Petro Poroshenko Bloc ===
On 2 September Kovalchuk stated that since his party and Petro Poroshenko Bloc had agreed to "joint participation in parliamentary elections" on 29 March 2014 the two parties were "in discussion" about "the format" for how to do so in the (late) October 2014 Ukrainian parliamentary election. On 15 September it became clear that 30% of the Petro Poroshenko Bloc election list would be filled by members of UDAR and that UDAR leader Vitali Klitschko is at the top of this list, Klitschko vowed not to resign as incumbent Mayor of Kyiv. Petro Poroshenko Bloc went on to win the 2014 Ukrainian parliamentary election with 132 seats; surpassing the runner up People's Front which won 82 seats. However, People's Front did perform better than the Petro Poroshenko Bloc with 0.33% in the nationwide election under party lists (22.14% against 21.81%) but the party did win 69 constituency seats while People's Front won only 18 constituencies.

On 28 August 2015 Petro Poroshenko Bloc and UDAR merged into 1 party, Petro Poroshenko Bloc. At the unifying congress (of 28 August 2015) Klitschko was elected as leader of this party.

In 2017 UDAR was still registered as a political party and it employed two persons. According to former UDAR member and Ukrainian lawmaker Dmytro Belotserkovets it was necessary that "the party performs only the technical functions necessary in terms of Ukrainian legislation."

=== Return as a political party ===
On 18 May 2019 party leader Klitschko announced that the party would take part in the 2019 Ukrainian parliamentary election.

On 4 June Klitschko offered former president of Georgia Mikheil Saakashvili to join the leadership of his party and to take part in the July 2019 early parliamentary elections with UDAR, Saakashvili turned down the offer.

In the July 2019 Ukrainian parliamentary election the party only competed in 15 single-mandate constituencies. It failed to win any seats. The party's most successful candidate was Yuriy Solovei who won 14.83% of the votes in constituency 89 located in Sniatyn (Ivano-Frankivsk Oblast). Its second most successful candidate, Valentyn Mondryivskyi, gained 4.84% of the votes in Kyiv's Podilskyi District.

In the election for Mayor of Kyiv of the 2020 Kyiv local election UDAR nominated incumbent mayor Klitschko as their candidate. Klitschko was last reelected in the election with 50.52% of the votes, in the first round of the election. UDAR won 30 Kyiv City Council seats in the 2020 Kyiv local election. In total in the whole of Ukraine the party gained 187 deputies (0.43% of all available mandates). In the elections for the Kyiv Oblast Council the party did not win any seats after finishing 9th place in the election.

== Ideology and political positions ==
UDAR tends to avoid sensitive and polarising subjects and focuses instead on popular topics, such as more empowerment to ordinary Ukrainians and a ruthless campaign against corruption, the indifference of the authorities, the lack of local governance, inequality, and poverty. The party wants to "unleash the power of the state and provide conditions for welfare".

The party is in favor of the Association Agreement between Ukraine and the European Union (EU). It has made no stance on a possible NATO membership of Ukraine.

UDAR wants to overcome social inequality with "the abandonment of the idea of cheap labor".

In education, the party wants to bring education in Ukraine to "European standards" by "development of external testing and monitoring the quality of education". UDAR wants to return to a 12-year compulsory secondary education with specialized training in the last two classes and three cycles of learning in higher education—bachelor's degree, master's degree and postgraduate. It also wants to guarantee autonomy of educational institutions by legislation.

The party wants to combat corruption in Ukraine with more transparency and the creation of an independent anti-corruption agency.

UDAR wants to reduce the number of state agencies in order "to minimize the interaction of the citizen with an official". And it wants to simplify procedures for registering property. It wants to reduce the number of taxes from 23 to 7 and to generally simplify the taxing system. "Owners of the land for agricultural purposes" should only be citizens of Ukraine.

UDAR wants to abolish the privileges of the Chairman of the Verkhovna Rada (Ukraine's parliament) and former Presidents of Ukraine and to reduce benefits for current parliamentarians.

The party has pledged to "reboot" the court system, and "reinforce the control of the public over elections".

The party is also in favor of direct democracy procedures, such as citizens' initiatives, after 150,000 signatures are collected. The party is in favor of elections with regional open lists and mayoral elections in two rounds. In local elections, it favors a voting age of 16 (currently 18). It also wants to introduce in Ukraine a law on impeachment of the president of Ukraine.

The party wants to simplify procedures for the establishment and registration of public and charitable organizations.

In June 2013, the party's parliamentary faction voted for the denunciation of the 2010 Ukrainian–Russian Naval Base for Natural Gas treaty. (Note: In June 2013, Ukraine's First Deputy Foreign Minister Ruslan Demchenko stated a unilateral denunciation of the 2010 Ukrainian–Russian Naval Base for Natural Gas treaty was not possible from a legal point of view.)

== Election results ==
=== Verkhovna Rada ===
| Year | Popular vote | Percentage | Overall seats | Change | Government | Remarks |
|---|---|---|---|---|---|---|
| 2006 | 12,027 | 0.04 | 0 / 450 | Steady | | as Political Party "European Capital" |
| 2007 | did not participate | | | | | as Political Party "European Capital" |
| 2012 | 2,847,878 | 13.97 | 40 / 450 | ▲40 | Opposition | |
| 2014 | Petro Poroshenko Bloc | | | | Coalition government | as non-partisan politicians of Petro Poroshenko Bloc |
| 2019 | single-mandate constituencies | | 0 / 424 | | Extra-Parliamentary | |

=== Kyiv City Council ===
| Year | Popular vote | Percentage | Overall seats | Change | Government | Remarks |
|---|---|---|---|---|---|---|
| 2008 | 122,243 | 10.61 | 15 / 120 | ▲1 | Opposition | as part of Vitali Klitschko Bloc |
| 2014 | 535,709 | 40.54 | 77 / 120 | ▲62 | Government | |
| 2015 | 237,970 | 27.56 | 52 / 120 | ▼25 | Government | as part of Petro Poroshenko Bloc |
| 2020 | 138,239 | 19.98 | 30 / 120 | ▼22 | Government | |

=== Local councils ===
| Election | Performance | | | | Rank |
| Election | % | ± pp | Seats | +/– | Rank |
|---|---|---|---|---|---|
| 2015 | 0.00% | New | 3 / 158,399 | New | 89th |
| 2020 | 0.44% | ▲0.44 | 186 / 43,122 | ▲183 | 32nd |

== Leaders ==
| Years | Party leader |
|---|---|
| 2005–2009 | Lev Partshaladze |
| 2009–2010 | Roman Romanyuk |
| 2010–present | Vitali Klitschko |
