= Oleksandr Omelchenko Bloc =

Oleksandr Omelchenko Bloc Блок Олександра Омельченка
- Leader: Oleksandr Omelchenko
- Founded: April 2008
- Headquarters: Kyiv
- International affiliation: None
- Colours: Green

Website
- http://www.omelchenko.in.ua

Oleksandr Omelchenko Bloc (Ukrainian: Блок Олександра Омельченка) is a local political party in the capital of Ukraine, Kyiv led by former mayor of Kyiv Oleksandr Omelchenko. During the 2008 local election the party won 2,26% of the votes and no seats in the Kyiv City Council.

== Election results ==
=== Kyiv City Council ===
| Year | Popular vote | Percentage | Overall seats | Change | Government |
|---|---|---|---|---|---|
| 2008 | | 2,26 | 0 / 120 | New | |
