= Lesya Orobets =

Ukrainian politician

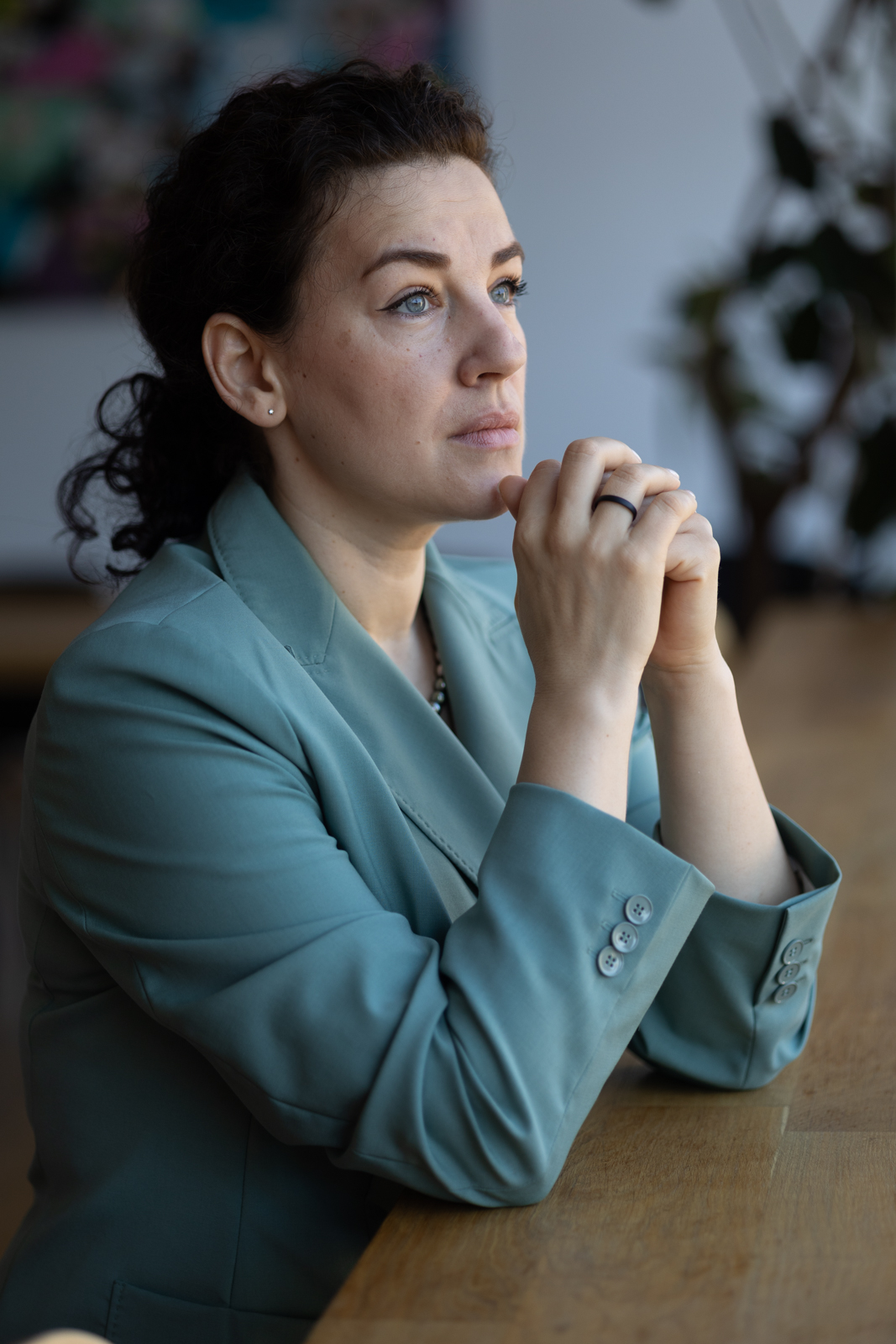

Member of Parliament of Ukraine
- In office November 23, 2007 – 27 November 2014

Personal details
- Born: Lesya Yuriyivna Orobets; May 3, 1982 (age 44) Kyiv
- Spouse: Oleksandr Omelchuk (2004-present)
- Children: Sofiya; Erika
- Education: Taras Shevchenko National University of Kyiv (Institute for International Relations)
- Occupation: Politician
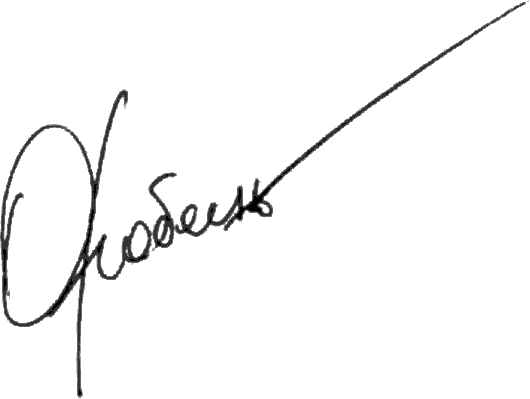
- Signature

Lesia Orobets (Ukrainian: Ле́ся Ю́ріївна Оробе́ць, born May 3, 1982, in Kyiv) is a former Member of Parliament of Ukraine and a civil society activist. As a founding director of the NGO Price of Freedom, she advocates for strengthening Ukraine's air defence and enhancing collective security along NATO’s eastern flank.

== Education ==
Lesia Orobets graduated with a Master’s degree from the Institute of International Relations at Taras Shevchenko National University in Kyiv, specializing in international law and English translation. Her academic training laid the foundation for her early career in the International Finance Corporation, World Bank Group, and Baker McKenzie law firm.

== Political career ==
=== Member of Parliament of Ukraine ===
Orobets began participating in political campaigns and grassroots electoral activities at the age of 12, assisting her father, Yuriy Orobets, who was People's Deputy of Ukraine at the time.

In 2003-2004, she volunteered as the deputy head of a local election committee during the 2004 presidential elections, contributing to efforts to resist electoral fraud allegedly orchestrated by pro-Russian forces led by Viktor Yanukovych. She played an active role in the subsequent Orange Revolution, which emphasized human rights, political freedoms, and Ukraine's closer alignment with Western institutions and values.

Lesia Orobets ran for office and was elected twice as a Member of Parliament in Ukraine (2007–2012, 2012–2014). During her tenure, she worked on modernizing Ukraine and addressing challenges related to Russia's hybrid occupation.

According to the newspaper DELO (2010), Orobets was selected as the most influential politician-blogger of 2010. Additionally, the magazine Focus named Orobets one of the 100 most influential women in Ukraine – ranking her 54th in 2011 and 26th in 2012.

She was instrumental in implementing the External Independent Evaluation (EIE), an educational reform that replaced corrupt and outdated admission practices. The EIE expanded access to higher education for talented students from low-income backgrounds, promoting greater equity and transparency in the system.

Orobets also successfully advocated for stricter tobacco regulations aimed at preventing underage smoking and reducing exposure to second-hand smoke.

According to analysts, Orobets may claim a record in the number of parliamentary appeals she has addressed to executive authorities at different levels of the government. Orobets is one of the founders of the national center of the Global Organization of Parliamentarians Against Corruption (GOPAC).

=== Opposition to the Yanukovych regime ===
Lesia Orobets opposed efforts by the Yanukovych regime to transform Ukraine into a Russia-controlled vassal state similar to Belarus. She notably refused to support an anti-democratic constitutional amendment that would have strengthened pro-Russian influence; the bill ultimately fell six votes short and was abandoned. In retaliation, the Yanukovych regime targeted her husband with criminal charges, a common tactic used against family members of MPs who enjoyed legal immunity at the time. After the regime fell in February 2014, her husband was fully acquitted.

=== Revolution of Dignity ===
Orobets actively participated in the Revolution of Dignity (Euromaidan) from its first day in November 2013 until March 2014. Her involvement was documented through her Facebook activity and public appearances.

She was a key figure in mobilizing public support for Ukraine's European integration throughout the protests. In February 2014, amid the peak of the political crisis, Orobets publicly refused to support the peace deal between the parliamentary opposition and President Viktor Yanukovych, arguing that it failed to address the protesters’ demands.

Orobets also issued an open appeal to Western leaders and international organizations on February 19, 2014, urging them to impose immediate sanctions on Yanukovych and his allies. She warned that inaction would enable further violence and escalate Vladimir Putin's influence in Ukraine, drawing parallels to the Syrian conflict. She highlighted the risks of destabilization across Europe and threats to Ukraine's strategic infrastructure, including its nuclear power plants and pipelines. She urged decisive intervention to prevent further bloodshed and safeguard Ukraine's democratic aspirations.

=== Kyiv mayoral elections ===
Orobets ran for Mayor of Kyiv in May 2014 against Vitali Klitschko. She ran a Western-style all-volunteer grassroots campaign, securing second place with 8.46% of the vote. She was elected into the Kyiv City Council since her party won 3 seats. But Orobets later decided not to become a deputy in the Kyiv City Council.

Then Orobets created the new party Mighty Ukraine that was registered at the Ukrainian Ministry of Justice on 27 July 2014. Orobets did not take part in the 2014 Ukrainian parliamentary election; citing health reasons.

== International Advocacy ==
=== Pre-2022 (Russia's full-scale invasion of Ukraine) ===
==== Secretary of the Committee on Foreign Affairs ====
Lesia Orobets served as Secretary of the Committee on Foreign Affairs in the Ukrainian Parliament and was a permanent member of Ukraine's delegation to the Parliamentary Assembly of the Council of Europe (PACE). In that role, she opposed the erosion of political rights and freedoms during Viktor Yanukovych's presidency, which was marked by pro-Russian policies and alleged political repression. One of her priorities as a Secretary of the Committee on Foreign Affairs is that Ukraine signs an Association Agreement with the EU.

During her second tenure, she also led the interparliamentary group with the Kingdom of Morocco and was a member of the interparliamentary groups with Canada, the Kingdom of Belgium, the State of Israel, Hungary, and the Italian Republic.

==== Advocacy for Personal Sanctions ====
During a PACE session on January 24, 2013, Orobets called for the implementation of personal sanctions to address political persecution in Ukraine. She argued that measures such as travel bans and asset freezes against those responsible would act as a deterrent.

- Recording of Lesia Orobets’ PACE address.

Criticism of Judicial Corruption

During another PACE session, Orobets criticized Serhii Kivalov—then a prominent figure in Yanukovych's administration—who had proposed reforms to the European Court of Human Rights based on Ukraine's judicial system. Orobets highlighted systemic flaws and corruption within Ukraine's judiciary, rejecting the idea of using it as a suitable model for European reforms.

- Recording of Lesia Orobets’ response to Kivalov.

The European Court of Human Rights (ECHR) later identified Serhii Kivalov as a violator in the case "Volkov v. Ukraine," referring to his actions related to the failure to comply with human rights guarantees during judicial reforms.

=== Post-2022 (Russia's full-scale invasion of Ukraine) ===
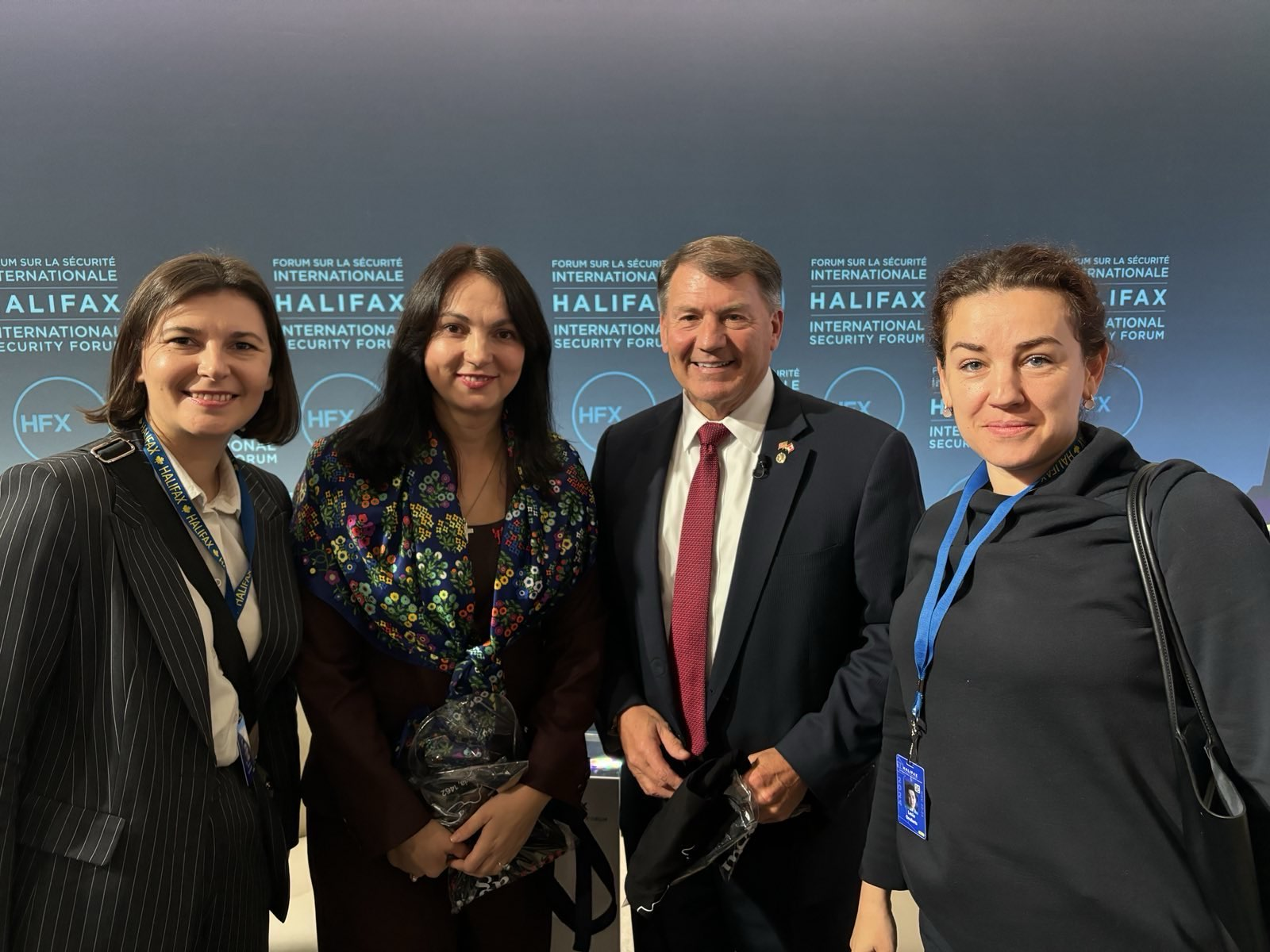
Halifax International Security Forum, 2024. Lesia Orobets appears at the far right.

Currently, Lesya Orobets leads the Safe Sky Initiative, an international advocacy campaign for safeguarding Ukrainian civilians and infrastructure from Russian air attacks.

As the leader of the non-governmental organization Price of Freedom, Orobets focuses on mobilizing European and transatlantic partners to help protect Ukrainian airspace. Her work involves active engagement with multiple stakeholders, including participation in a British parliamentary working group on air defense provisions for Ukraine.

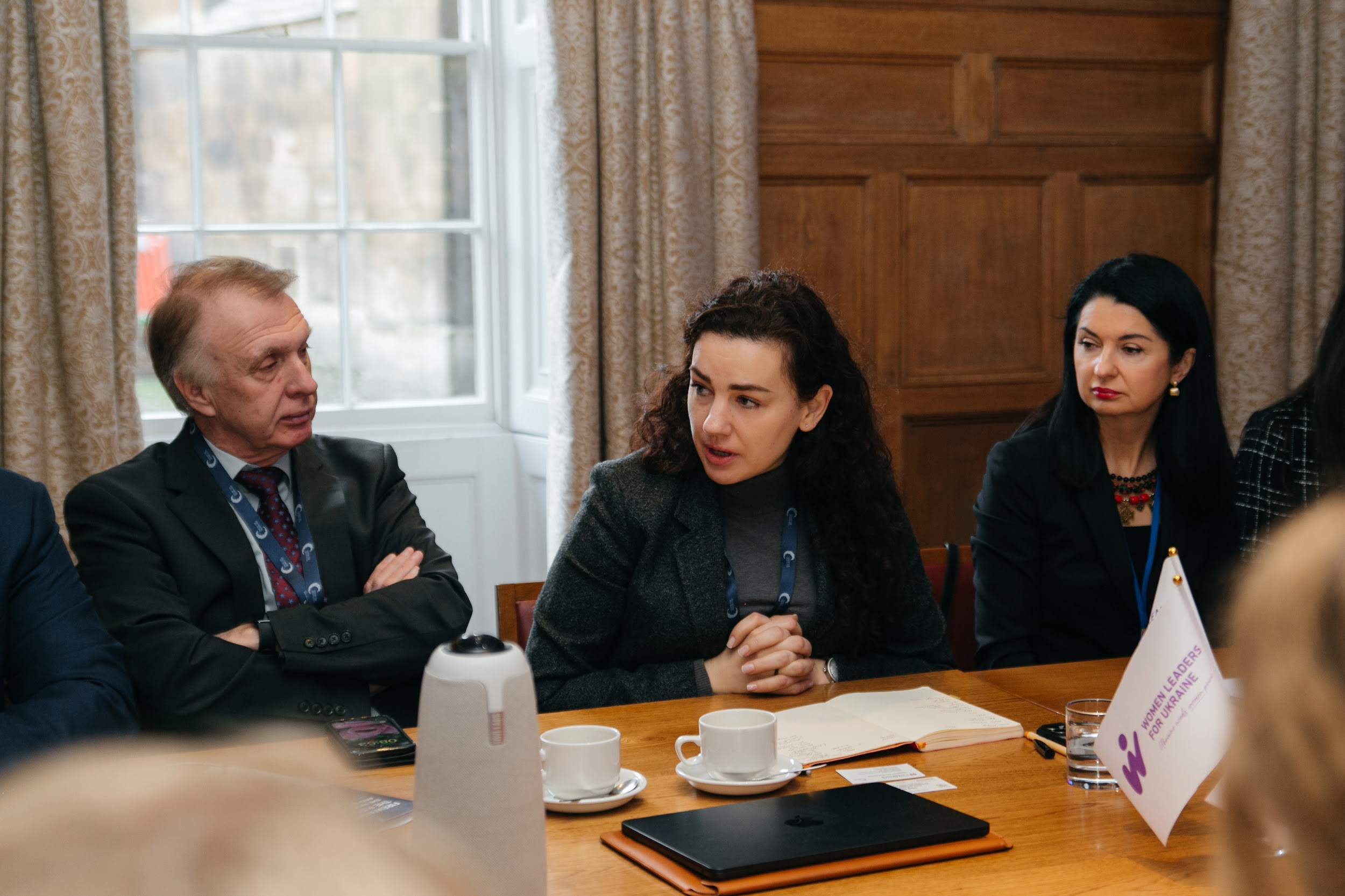
Speaking at the Women Leaders for Ukraine round table during the 'Fireballing the Future' conference at the University of Cambridge, 17.02.2025

==== International Engagements and Public Speaking ====
Lesia Orobets is frequently invited to speak at or attend international security conferences and forums. She has participated in prominent events such as:

- Chatham House’s events in London and Centre for Geopolitics’ conference in Cambridge
- De Balie’s forum in Amsterdam (speech and roundtable discussion recording)
- Halifax International Security Forum, 2024
- Ukraine Action Summit in Washington, 2024

Orobets’ advocacy extends to diplomatic negotiations and strategic communication with partners in Europe and North America.

== Recent Media ==
Orobets has shared her insights through interviews and public appearances:

1. Interview for The Ukrainians: Discusses Ukraine's resilience and international support efforts.
2. Video interview – 6 Nov 2024: Discussion of necessary actions to weaken the aggressor, analysis of unknown aspects of the enemy's strategy and tactics.
3. Podcast Episode with "The Eastern Front" (American Enterprise Institute) – 16th Oct 2024: Orobets discusses Eastern Europe's security outlook, and delays in modernizing European defense industrial bases.
4. Video Interview – 17 Mar 2024: A conversation about the role of war in shaping the elite and the impact of the Revolution of Dignity on society.

== Family ==
Daughter of Yuriy Orobets (Ukrainian: Ю́рій Микола́йович Оробе́ць), a posthumously awarded Hero of Ukraine (2007) who served as a Member of Parliament in 1994-1998 and 2002-2006. His political struggle against oligarchic influence and electoral fraud is credited with laying the groundwork for the Orange Revolution and the emergence of civil society in Ukraine. Her mother, Oksana (Ukrainian: Оксана), is a chemical engineer.

Lesia Orobets is married and has two daughters. Her husband has been serving as a Ukrainian officer on the front lines of the Russo-Ukrainian war since the onset of the full-scale invasion.
