= 2006 Ukrainian local elections =

- March 26, 2006
- Results of the 2006 local election leaders by Ukrainian regions.

The 2006 Ukrainian local elections took place on March 26, 2006. The elections saw the southern and eastern regions of the country vote for the Party of Regions, while the west and central regions were won by the Our Ukraine Bloc and Yulia Tymoshenko Bloc, respectively. They were followed by the 2010 local elections.

In the 2006 Ukrainian parliamentary election, also held on March 26, the mayors of Chernihiv, Poltava, Kirovohrad, and Cherkasy were elected into the Ukrainian parliament. Hence mayoral by-elections in these 4 cities were held on November 26, 2006. In these by-elections voter turnout was low (20-30%, compared to 70-80% in the 2006 parliamentary election).

== See also ==
- 2006 Crimean parliamentary election
