= 2010 Ukrainian local elections =

- October 31, 2010
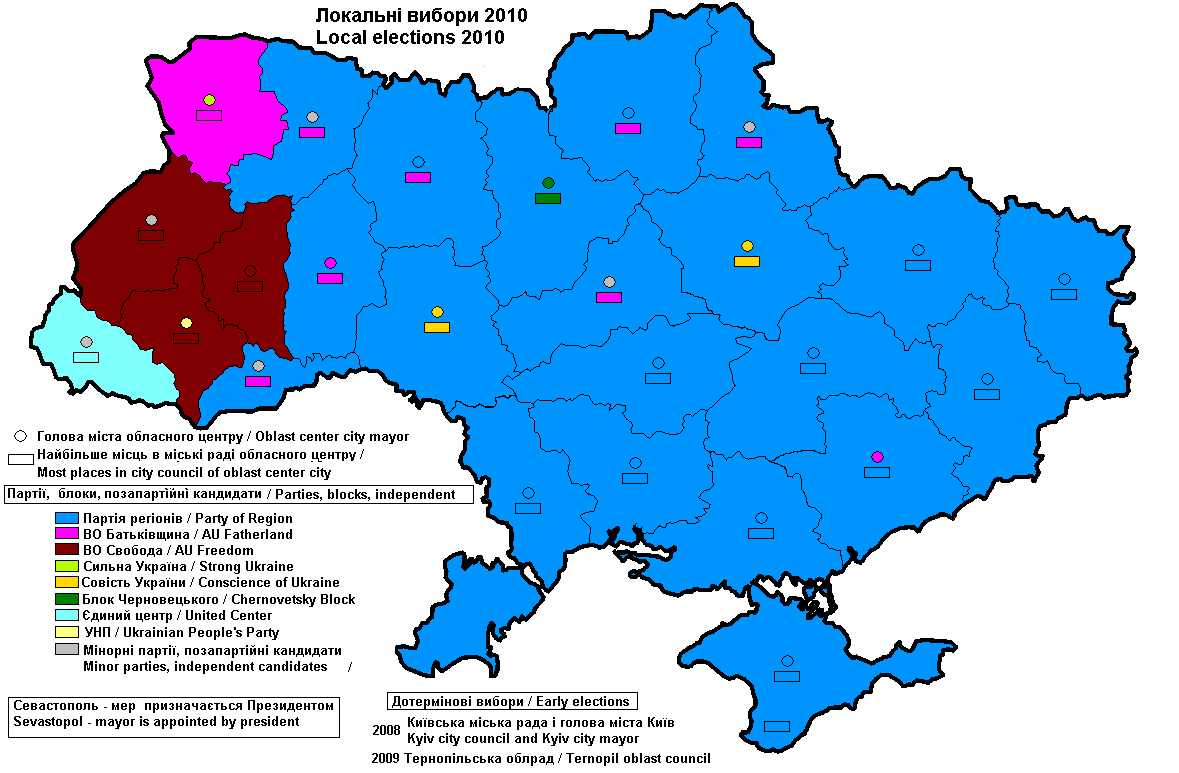
- Results of the 2010 provincial capital, mayoral elections, and regional parliament elections.

The 2010 Ukrainian local elections took place on 31 October 2010, two years before the 2012 general election. The voter turnout across Ukraine was about 50%, which is considered low in comparison to previous elections.

The ruling Party of Regions won clear majorities in most regions and big cities throughout Ukraine (except in the west of the country), leaving Batkivshchyna far behind. The Ukrainian nationalistic party Svoboda achieved notable success in Eastern Galicia while Our Ukraine, a major force in Ukrainian politics in the early 21st century, met with total failure. The results were contested by opposition politicians and the Communist Party.

== Rescheduling of election date ==
On February 16, 2010 the Verkhovna Rada (the parliament of Ukraine) cancelled all Ukrainian local election dates original set for May 30, 2010. A new date was not set but Members of Parliament expected new local elections in the spring of 2011. On April 2, 2010 the Verkhovna Rada set early local elections in a number of cities, towns and villages for June 20, 2010. According to opposition lawmaker Mykola Katerynchuk (Our Ukraine–People's Self-Defense Bloc faction) the voting results proved that the Party of Regions intends to extend its influence over local government bodies, as the faction did not support elections in any of those regions where they already had a majority.

In late April 2010, President Viktor Yanukovych expected local elections in Ukraine to take place in 2011. In late May 2010, Yanukovych stated that local elections would be held the following autumn. Yanukovych also called for these elections to be based on the majority representation system and stressed the need to adopt the relevant laws.

On July 1, 2010, the Verkhovna Rada scheduled the election for Sunday, October 31, 2010. On July 11, lawmakers approved the bill on the procedure for holding the elections. A total of 259 out of 485 MPs registered voted to pass the bill. Before voting, the Bloc Yulia Tymoshenko faction walked out of parliament in protest against consideration the bill without taking into account the faction's proposals. The party is planning to challenge the law on local elections under a majority-proportional system at the Constitutional Court of Ukraine. This was done by the Front of Changes party on August 5, 2010. Besides Front of Changes and Bloc Yulia Tymoshenko Deputy Prime Minister Sergei Tigipko's Strong Ukraine party also stated the law violates the Constitution.

== Restrictions for political parties ==
Parties that have been established less than a year before the election and political blocs were at first not permitted to compete in the election. This meant that parties like Strong Ukraine and Front of Changes who are high in election polls were excluded. Soon Bloc Yulia Tymoshenko (which won 156 out of 450 seats in the 2007 parliamentary elections) announced it would not participate in the elections but its main component, the All-Ukrainian Union "Fatherland", will.

On August 30, 2010 the Verkhovna Rada approved Party of Regions leader Oleksandr Yefremov's amendments to the law on the election extends the opportunity to participate in local elections to all parties, not only those registered more than a year before the elections. Similar bills submitted by lawmakers Lev Biriuk (Bloc Yulia Tymoshenko) and Arseniy Yatsenyuk (Our Ukraine-People's Self-Defense) had failed to collect the necessary number of votes to pass.

== Electoral issues ==
Initially parties that had been established less than a year before the election and political blocs were not permitted to compete in the election; but on August 30, 2010 this restriction was abandoned by the Verkhovna Rada.

Self-nomination for the post of mayor was not allowed. Half of the total number of local council deputies were to be elected from the lists of political parties in a multi-mandate constituency. The other half was elected under a majority system in single-mandate constituencies. The elections were held with closed lists. The election campaign started on September 11, 2010.

Running up to the election a number of opposition parties complained about violations of election legislation by election commissions across the country. A number of territorial election commissions contained members who although expelled by their party were appointed under the quota of the party they were expelled from. Owing to the anomalies in the electoral law some parties, such as Batkivshchyna, were unable to register their candidates in several districts and provinces. Batkivshchyna-leader Yulia Tymoshenko claimed that "fraudulent Batkivshchyna party organizations were registered on orders from Viktor Yanukovych".

=== Regional exceptions ===
Except the election of Kyiv mayor, the Next Kyiv local election and the elections to Ternopil Regional Council elections will be conducted in all local authorities.

The elections in rural councils are held under a simple plurality voting system based on single-member constituencies; the elections of mayors of cities, towns and villages are held under a plurality voting system in single-member constituencies that lie within the boundaries of the relevant city, town or village.

Parties or candidates themselves can propose to run election in rural areas and for the posts of rural areas heads; only local parties can propose candidates for the post of city mayors.

The Supreme Council of Crimea decided to hold the 2010 Crimean parliamentary election simultaneously with the Ukrainian local elections on August 4, 2010.

=== Costs ===
Ukraine's Central Electoral Commission estimated the cost of holding local elections at 3.1 million Hryvnya in May 2010 and over 1 billion Hryvnya in July 2010. The Ukrainian Finance Ministry and the Central Election Commission signed a joint protocol, which envisaged a provision of 1.024 billion Hryvnya of budget funds the elections on September 14, 2010.

== Results ==
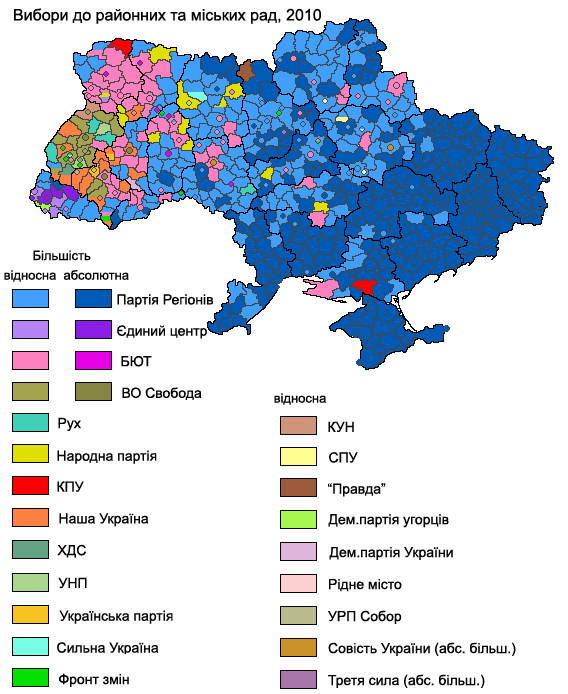
2010 local election results in city and district councils

The ruling Party of Regions won clear majorities in most regions and big cities throughout Ukraine (except in the west of the country) with 51,93% of the seats; it is the biggest party in two-thirds of all cities. It was followed by All-Ukrainian Union "Fatherland". The Ukrainian nationalistic party Svoboda achieved notable success in Eastern Galicia. Batkivshchyna, the party of the previous Prime Minister Yulia Tymoshenko, remains the main opposition force although it was defeated in most regions (because of anomalies in the electoral law the party was unable to register their candidates in several districts). Our Ukraine, the party of previous President Yushchenko, met with total failure. Strong Ukraine gained about 6 percent of the votes nationwide.

Ukraine's Central Election Commission has declined to publish nationwide results, citing, "these are local elections and traditionally we don't do that".

Opposition politicians and the Communist Party have complained of irregularities in the election. According to a survey of 2,000 people conducted in October 2010 by two Ukrainian nongovernmental organizations, the Democratic Initiatives Fund and OPORA, one in five Ukrainians were willing to sell his or her vote in the upcoming local elections. OPORA stated on November 1, 2010 that “there have been so many violations that we cannot say that [the election] was democratic, transparent and open.” But according to Prime Minister Mykola Azarov "The elections were absolutely without the use of administrative resources, naturally. Nobody interfered with our citizens." According to President Viktor Yanukovych "there were no systematic violations. This is emphasized by international observers and the police”.

== International reactions ==
The Council of Europe uncovered a number of problems in relation to a new electorate law approved just prior to the elections. International observers of the CIS Interparliamentary Assembly stated the local elections in Ukraine were organised well. The European Parliament repeated the criticisms of the Council of Europe and stated the election "did not set a new, positive standard". According to the High Representative of the Union for Foreign Affairs and Security Policy Catherine Ashton "the electoral framework and the administration of the elections undermined public confidence in the electoral process and in the further consolidation of democracy in Ukraine".

The Obama administration criticised the conduct of the elections, saying they "did not meet standards for openness and fairness." The National Democratic Institute stated on November 2, 2010: “The environment surrounding Ukraine’s October 31 local elections has deteriorated compared to the situation during the presidential election earlier this year.”

== See also ==
- 2008 Kyiv local election
- 2009 Ternopil Oblast local election
- 2010 Crimean parliamentary election
