= Legal status and local government of Kyiv =

The city of Kyiv has a unique legal status compared to the other administrative subdivisions of Ukraine. The most significant difference is that the city is functionally independent of the oblast (province) in which it is located. That is, Kyiv is subordinated directly to the national-level branches of the Government of Ukraine, skipping the provincial level authorities of Kyiv Oblast, but hosting the administrative and infrastructure bodies for the latter.

The unique standing of the city's institutions of self-governance reflects the role of Kyiv as the capital of Ukraine and is also based on the city's historical administrative status within the Soviet Union where Kyiv (spelt "Kiev" in Russian at the time) held the position of a City of republican subordination.

The head of the local government (the Mayor of Kyiv) is elected, rather than appointed, and the municipal government has greater latitude in local affairs that elsewhere in Ukraine. The President of Ukraine appoints the Head of Kyiv City Administration.

Currently, the legal status and the local government of Kyiv is regulated by the special provisions of the Constitution of Ukraine as well as a combination of Ukrainian laws, namely the Law on the capital of Ukraine - Hero City Kyiv, the Law on the local state administration and the Law on local self-governance in Ukraine.

Its special administrative status is recognized in the Ukrainian Constitution in Chapter IX: Territorial Structure of Ukraine and is governed in accordance with laws passed by Ukraine's parliament, the Verkhovna Rada.

The scope and structure of the Kyiv local government and the status of the current Kyiv City Council is the subject of an ongoing bitter legal and political crisis. The oppositional parties that dominate the city after 2012 parliamentary elections considered the City Council term of authority expired and effectively blocked attempts at its convening through mass protest.

== Legal status within the administrative subdivision of Ukraine ==
Kyiv is a national-level subordinated municipality (officially "a city with special status"), which means that the city is directly subordinated to national-level government rather than to the provincial level authorities of Kyiv Oblast, which surrounds the city.

Of only two special status municipalities of national-level subordination in Ukraine (the other being the city of Sevastopol also administratively independent from the surrounding Autonomous Republic of Crimea) Kyiv's status somewhat differs from the status of Sevastopol as the latter's scope of local government is narrower.

Kyiv city itself is divided into administrative urban districts, which have their own units of central and local government with jurisdiction over a limited scope of affairs. Districts are the lowest level of the city's government although some of the districts include geographically distinct "villages" (e.g., settlements surrounded by forest). As with other urban districts, the Kyiv City Council is deputed to define the jurisdiction of its districts' authorities. However, only Verkhovna Rada (the parliament) may create, or liquidate the districts, or change their administrative boundaries.

== Local government ==
The popularly elected Kyiv City Council is the city-level legislative body of Kyiv, with a broad scope of jurisdiction over the local issues. The council is chaired by the Mayor of Kyiv, who is independently elected by a separate popular election.

Under the Constitution of Ukraine, the term of office of the heads of villages and towns and the council members of these villages and towns is five years.

Kyiv City State Administration is the national-level branch of the Government of Ukraine that administers Kyiv, the capital of Ukraine — a "City with special status".

The President of Ukraine appoints the Head of the City State Administration. Traditionally, unlike other similar appointments in Ukraine, this appointment was purely formal, because the Constitutional Court of Ukraine ruled that the elected city mayor was to be also appointed as the head of the City State Administration. This provision is unique, as other similar appointments of the local administration chiefs throughout Ukraine are made by the agreement of the president and the prime pinister; only in Kyiv, the mayor or council chairperson may combine their elected position with the executive position in the local State Administration. However, this system was ended in 2010 when Parliament empowered the president to replace the mayor as head of the state administration which the person of the president's choosing.

The central executive power is also represented on the lowest district level of city authority. There are State Administrations, Internal Affairs (police) Department and other executive bodies in each of Kyiv's districts.

== Administrative seat of Kyiv Oblast and Kyiv-Sviatoshyn Raion ==
Kyiv hosts most of the governing bodies of Kyiv Oblast (which are generally separate from the city government). Separately, until 2020, Kyiv also served as the administrative center of lower-level Kyiv-Sviatoshyn Raion (district) of Kyiv Oblast as the former was a purely suburban area lacking a distinct central settlement. Healthcare and other public services infrastructure of Kyiv Oblast and, formerly, Kyiv-Sviatoshyn Raion is also located primarily within the city of Kyiv.

== See also ==
- City status in Ukraine
- Subdivisions of Kyiv
