= Kyiv City Council =

City council; lawmaking body of Kyiv, Ukraine

Kyiv City Council Київська міська рада
- 9th convocation
- Coat of arms of Kyiv

Type
- Type: Unicameral

Leadership
- Mayor: Vitali Klitschko, UDAR since 5 June 2014
- Secretary: Volodymyr Bondarenko, UDAR since 3 December 2020

Structure
- Seats: 120
- Political groups: European Solidarity (30); UDAR (29); Unity of Oleksandr Omelchenko (14); Servant of the People (12); Batkivshchyna (12); Holos (9); Platform for Life and Peace (5); Independent (8); Vacant (2)

Elections
- Last election: 25 October 2020

Meeting place
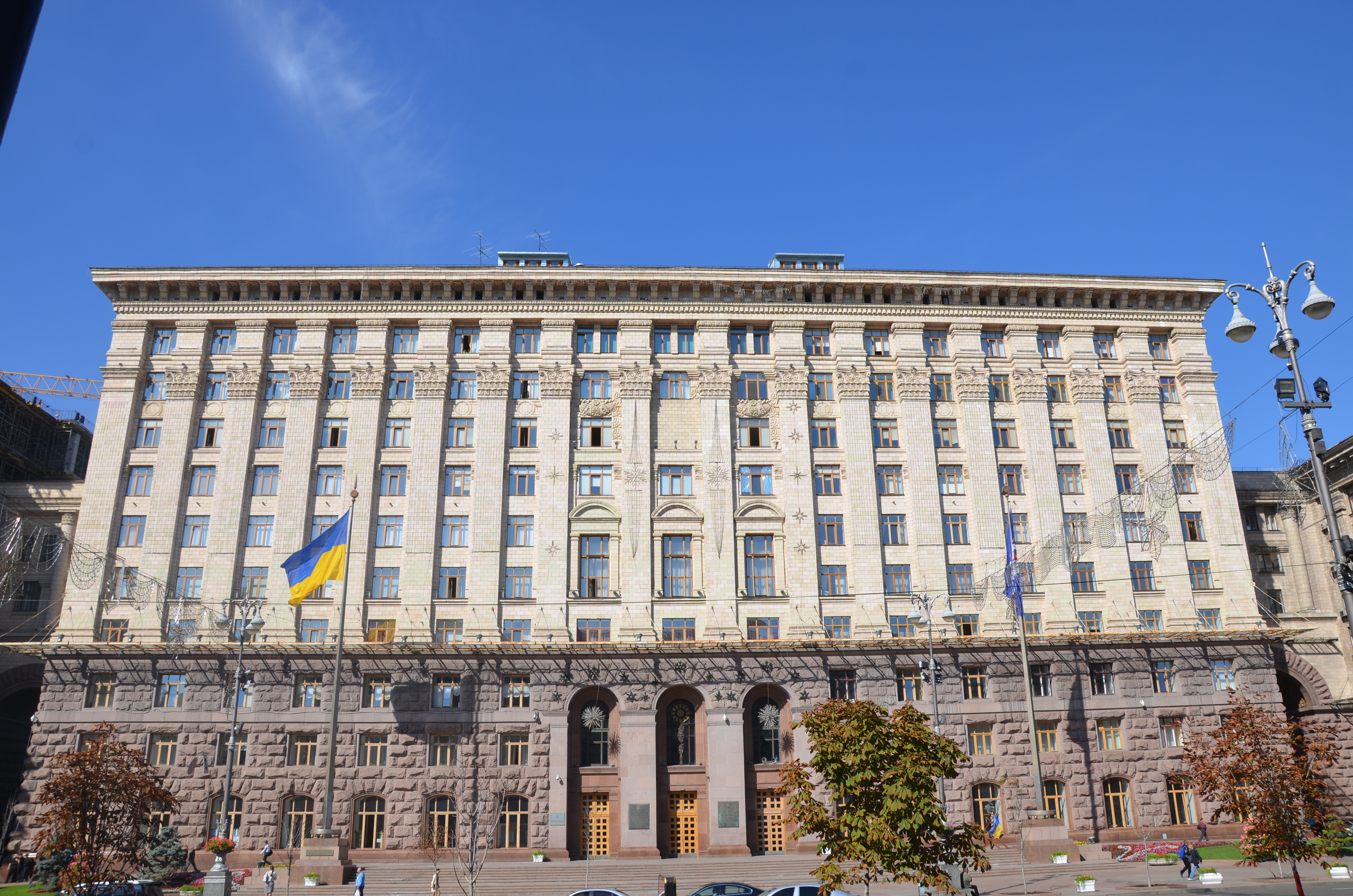
- Building of the City Council and State Administration, Kyiv, Ukraine; 50°26′47″N 30°31′16″E

Website
- www.kmr.gov.ua

Kyiv City Council (Ukrainian: Київська міська рада, romanized: Kyivska miska rada, IPA: [ˈkɪjiu̯sʲkɐ miˈsʲkɑ ˈrɑdɐ]), also known as Kyivrada (Ukrainian: Київрада), is the city council of Kyiv municipality, the highest representative body of the city community. The members of city council are directly elected by Kyivans and the council is chaired by the Mayor of Kyiv (who is also directly elected in a separate election independent of the council election) or the City Council Secretary (elected among the council members). The deputies are elected for five-year terms.

The council meets in a 1950s City Council building constructed in neo-classical Stalinist architectural style on Khreschatyk, the city's main street.

The most recent Kyiv local election (including Mayoral elections) took place on 25 October 2020.

== History ==
Empress of Russia Catherine the Great's municipal reform created Kyiv's city council in 1780.

In its 1781 first municipal elections just under 6,000 of Kyiv's 70,500 inhabitants were qualified to vote.

The first post-Soviet democratic elections of the Kyiv City Council took place on 4 March 1990.

The first ceremonial raising of the yellow-and-blue Ukrainian flag in modern times took place on 24 July 1990 at the flagstaff of the City Council, two years before the flag was officially adopted as the National flag of the Ukrainian state (1992). 24 July was later marked as National Flag Day in Kyiv (only). Beginning with 2004, 23 August is celebrated as the Day of the National Flag (in all Ukraine).

During the Euromaidan-protest from 1 December 2013 till 16 February 2014 Kyiv's Town Hall was occupied by protesters; this forced the City Council to meet in the Solomianka Raion state administration building instead.

== Composition ==
=== Parliamentary parties ===
The results of the 2020 Kyiv local election:

- 31 European Solidarity
- 30 Ukrainian Democratic Alliance for Reform (UDAR)
- 14 Unity of Oleksandr Omelchenko
- 12 Opposition Platform — For Life
- 12 Servant of the People
- 12 Batkivshchyna
- 9 Holos

== See also ==
- Legal status and local government of Kyiv
- Kyiv City Committee of the Communist Party of Ukraine
- Mayor of Kyiv
- Kyiv City State Administration
