= Mykola Katerynchuk =

Ukrainian politician

- Микола Катеринчук
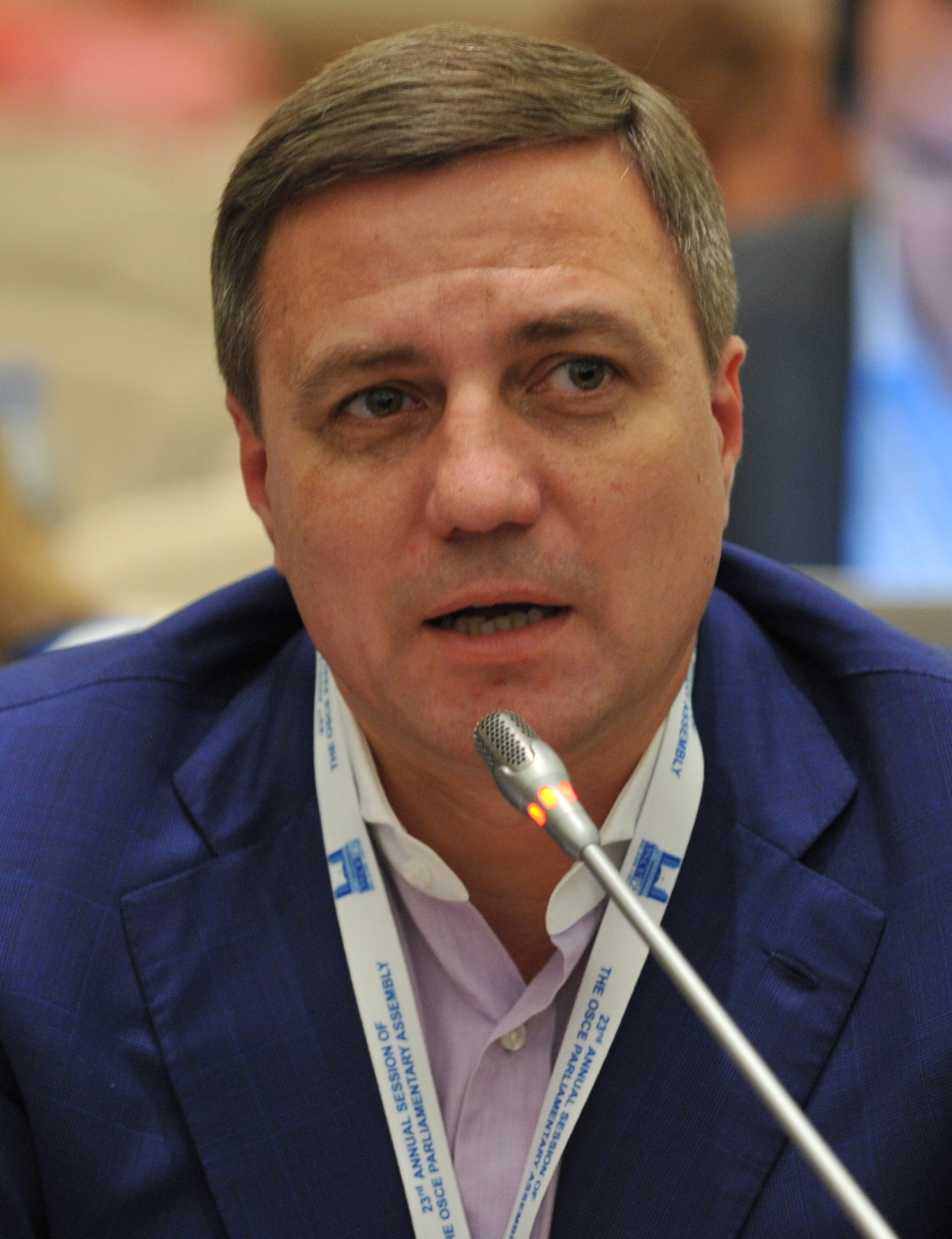
- Katerynchuk in 2014

People's Deputy of Ukraine
- In office 14 May 2002 – 27 November 2014
- Preceded by: Oleh Yukhnovskyi (2002); Constituency re-established (2012)
- Succeeded by: Constituency abolished (2006); Petro Yurchyshyn (2014)
- Constituency: Vinnytsia Oblast, No. 13 (2002–2006, 2012–2014); Our Ukraine, No. 8 (2006–2007); Our Ukraine–People's Self-Defense Bloc, No. 5 (2007–2012)

Personal details
- Born: 19 November 1967 (age 58) Lugovoye, Altai Krai, Russian SFSR, Soviet Union
- Party: European Party of Ukraine
- Other political affiliations: Our Ukraine; Our Ukraine–People's Self-Defense Bloc; Batkivshchyna (2012–2014); Petro Poroshenko Bloc (2014); Civil Position
- Education: Taras Shevchenko National University of Kyiv; National University of Life and Environmental Sciences of Ukraine
- Website: katerynchuk.kiev.ua (Archived 5 August 2013)

Military service
- Allegiance: Soviet Union
- Branch/service: Soviet Army
- Years of service: 1985–1987
- Battles/wars: Soviet–Afghan War

Mykola Dmytrovych Katerynchuk (Ukrainian: Микола Дмитрович Катеринчук; born 19 November 1967) is a Ukrainian politician and lawyer who served as a People's Deputy of Ukraine from 2002 to 2014. The chairman of the European Party of Ukraine.

== Early life and career ==
Katerynchuk was born on 19 November 1967 in the village of Lugovoye, in what is now Russia's Altai Krai and what was then part of the Soviet Union. He served in the Soviet Army from 1985 to 1987, fighting in the Soviet–Afghan War. In one instance, he escaped death after he was ordered off a helicopter due to it being overloaded. The helicopter was shot down by members of the mujahideen shortly after taking off, and Katerynchuk later credited the experience with both leading him to be religious and giving him an interest in improving the lives of others.

From 1988 to 1993 Katerynchuk studied at the faculty of law of the Taras Shevchenko National University of Kyiv. He completed his dissertation in 2001. From 1992 to 1995 he was a legal consultant to INKO Bank in Kyiv, and he was a founder and attorney at Moor and Krosondovich, a Kyiv-based law firm, from 1995 until his election as People's Deputy. From 2007 to 2009 he studied at the National University of Life and Environmental Sciences of Ukraine, graduating with a Master of Business Economics.

== Political career ==
Katernychuk was first elected as a People's Deputy of Ukraine in the 2002 Ukrainian parliamentary election, when he was elected to Ukraine's 13th electoral district in Vinnytsia Oblast as an independent. Following his election, he joined the Our Ukraine party. He was re-elected on the proportional list of the Our Ukraine Bloc in 2006 and 2007 before once again serving from the 13th electoral district from 2012 to 2014, this time as a member of Batkivshchyna.

- November–December 2004 Viktor Yushchenko's Spokesman at the Supreme Court of Ukraine trial on the appeal about recognition the results of the 2004 Presidential Elections as invalid
- 2004–2005 Trustee of Victor Yushchenko during his Presidential elections
- 2005–2006 Chairman of the Central Executive Committee of Our Ukraine
- March–September 2005 The First Deputy Chairman of the State Tax Administration of Ukraine
- Since September 2007 member of the European Party of Ukraine, Chairman of the Party
- November 2007-December 2012 People's Deputy of Ukraine, 6th Convocation, Faction Our Ukraine–People's Self-Defense Bloc, Deputy Vice-Chairman of the Committee on finance, banking, tax and customs issues

Katerynchuk was the Petro Poroshenko Bloc's candidate in the 13th electoral district during the 2014 Ukrainian parliamentary election. He was defeated by independent Petro Yurchyshyn by a margin of 3.5%.

After declaring support for the candidature of Anatoliy Hrytsenko in the 2019 Ukrainian presidential election Katerynchuk became Hrytsenko's legal advisor in Hrytsenko's election headquarters.

In the July 2019 Ukrainian parliamentary election Katerynchuk is placed in the top five in the top ten of the party list of Civil Position. But the party did not win any seats (winning 1.04% of the national vote and not one constituency).

== Leadership in the European party of Ukraine ==
On 14 December 2006, Upon the invitation of the Organizing Committee of the European Movement of Ukraine over 500 representatives of different civic movements, organizations, small and medium business enterprises, students, teachers, state employees and political leaders gathered in Kyiv to found the liberal political party the European Party of Ukraine. Mykola Katerynchuk was unanimously elected the Leader of the Party. In 2013 the number of members is over 5,000. By July 2013 the European party is represented in the Verkhovna Rada of Ukraine (1 seat), in the Kyiv City Council (2 seats) and in local self-government councils (150 seats).

== Public activities ==
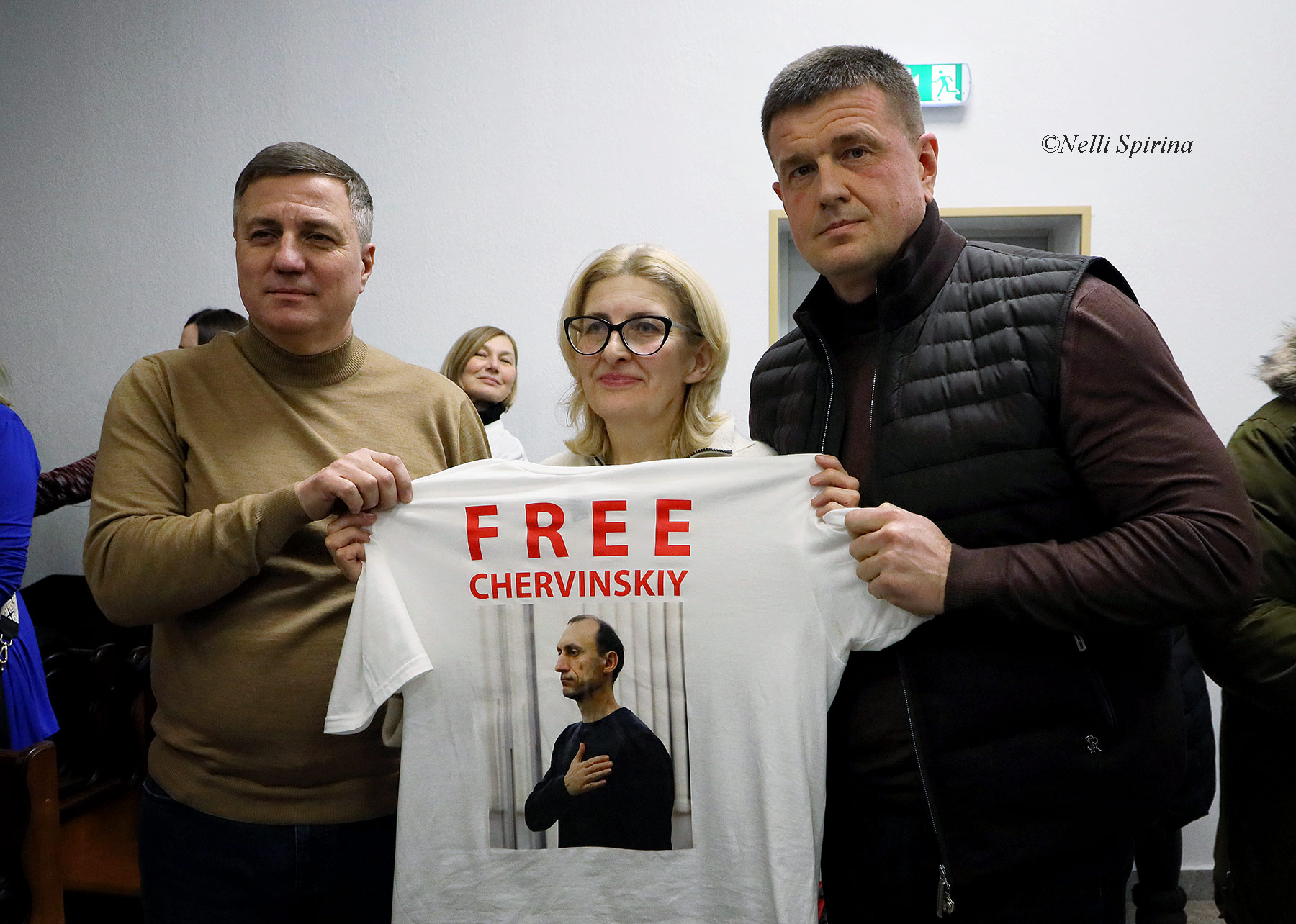
Mykola Katerynchuk, Roksolana Khmara (wife of human rights activist Stepan Khmara) and Colonel-General Vasyl Burba as part of Roman Chervinsky's support group at the Kyiv Court of Appeal on January 25, 2024

Since 2002 - initiated the Social Program "People's Attorney" in his electoral district in Vinnytsia oblast during the Parliamentary elections. The aim is to provide free legal assistance to Ukrainian citizens. In July 2012 function 26 offices in 9 different regions of Ukraine, Kyiv and also one office in Hannover (Germany). Since the first day, the program has helped 55 thousands of citizens.

2005 - established the Tax Club that united representatives of small and medium businesses, lawyers and economists. As a result of their interaction, a draft of the Tax Code was created to simplify doing business in Ukraine and fiscal policy as a whole. Several times a bill was introduced to Parliament. Though the Azarov's Tax Code was adopted that led to the Tax Maidan protests in 2010.

== International political activities ==
2009:

February Joined the 3rd Economic Forum of Europe - Ukraine in Kyiv

April In the framework of official visit to Brussels and Strasbourg took part in the official start of the ELDR campaign for the European Parliament, met with the leader of the Alliance of Liberals and Democrats for Europe Mr. Graham Watson.

November Head of the European Party of Ukraine delegation to the ELDR Congress held in Barcelona, Spain.

2010:

April 12-day trial visit to the European Parliament in Strasbourg and Brussels, a number of meetings with MPs-members of ALDE.

October Head of the European Party of Ukraine delegation to the ELDR Congress held in Helsinki, Finland.

2011:

April — Head of the European Party of Ukraine delegation to Georgia, meetings with government officials and parliamentarians, discussions about Georgian reforms and Ukraine-Georgia cooperation issues.

May official visit to Brussels together with representatives of the European Party of Ukraine within "Ukraine-EU Parliamentary Club", parliamentary meetings with European colleagues. Submission during this visit the application of the European Party of Ukraine to the ELDR "On acquiring the status of associate member".

August participation in the forum "Ukraine-EU Parliamentary Club", held in Ukraine. 14 MEPs from different factions and representatives of the Ukrainian parliament took part in the event.

October official visit to Brussels, meetings with European counterparts.

2012:

25–26 May —— One of the initiators, organizers and participant of the international political conference "Liberal Democracy in Ukraine. On the Road to the European Integration" held in Odesa, Ukraine

2013:

10–11 May —— Head of the European Party of Ukraine delegation to ALDE Party Council, Pula, Chroatia. There the European Party of Ukraine got a full membership in ALDE Party.

Since July — member of the Parliamentarians Network for Conflict Prevention

== Awards ==
2007: State Order "For Perfect Service" of the third level
