= International reactions to the Euromaidan =

Below are the foreign reactions to the Euromaidan. (Note: The term "Euromaidan" was initially used as a hashtag on Twitter. A Twitter account named Euromaidan was created on the first day of the protests. It soon became popular in the international media. It is composed of two parts: "Euro" is short for Europe and "maidan" refers to Maidan Nezalezhnosti (Independence Square), the main square of Kyiv, where the protests were centered.) Euromaidan was a wave of demonstrations and civil unrest in Ukraine that began on the night of 21 November 2013 after the Ukrainian government suspended preparations for signing an Association Agreement and Deep and Comprehensive Free Trade Agreement with the European Union.

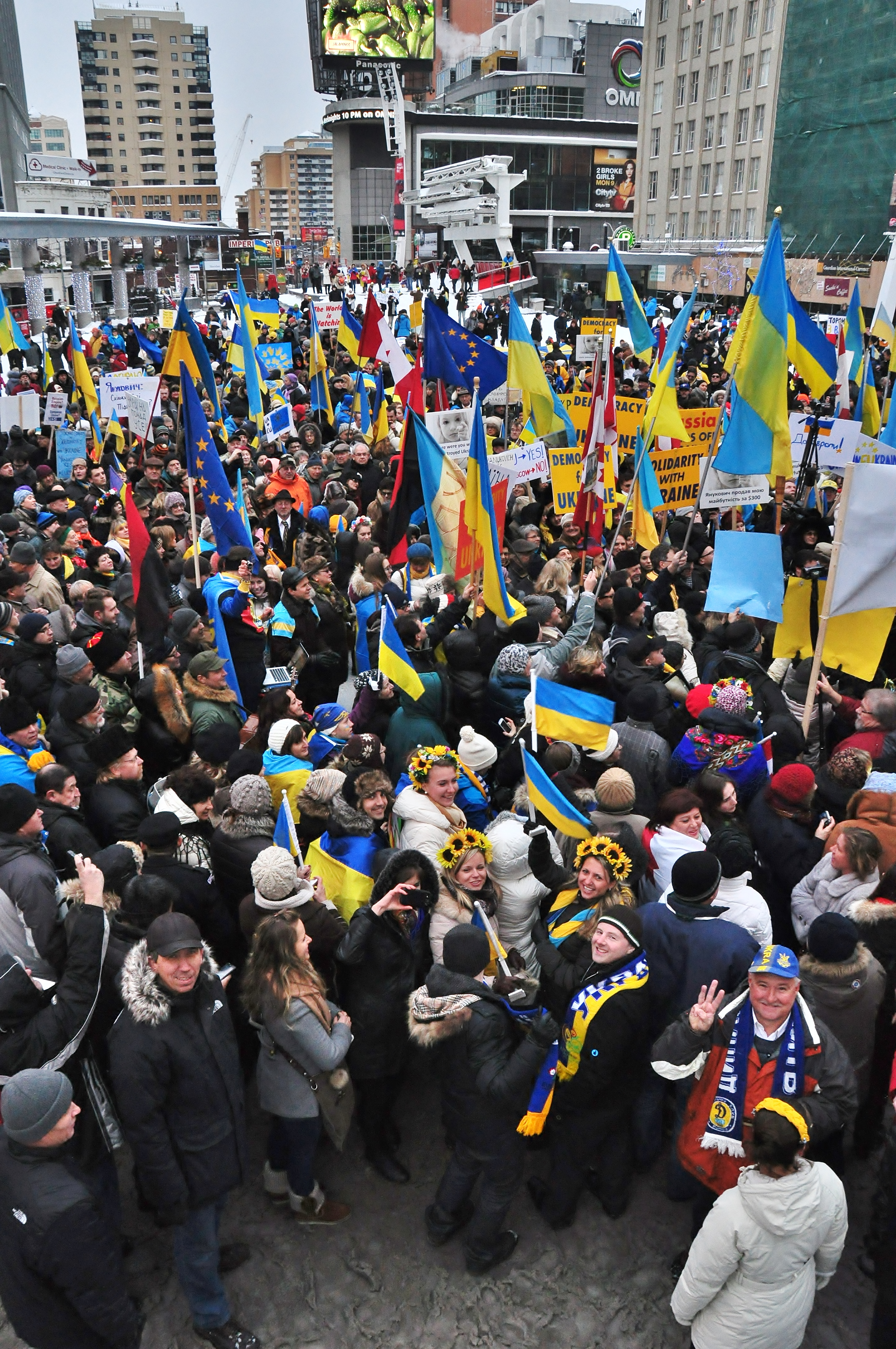
Toronto Euromaidan rally on 15 December 2013

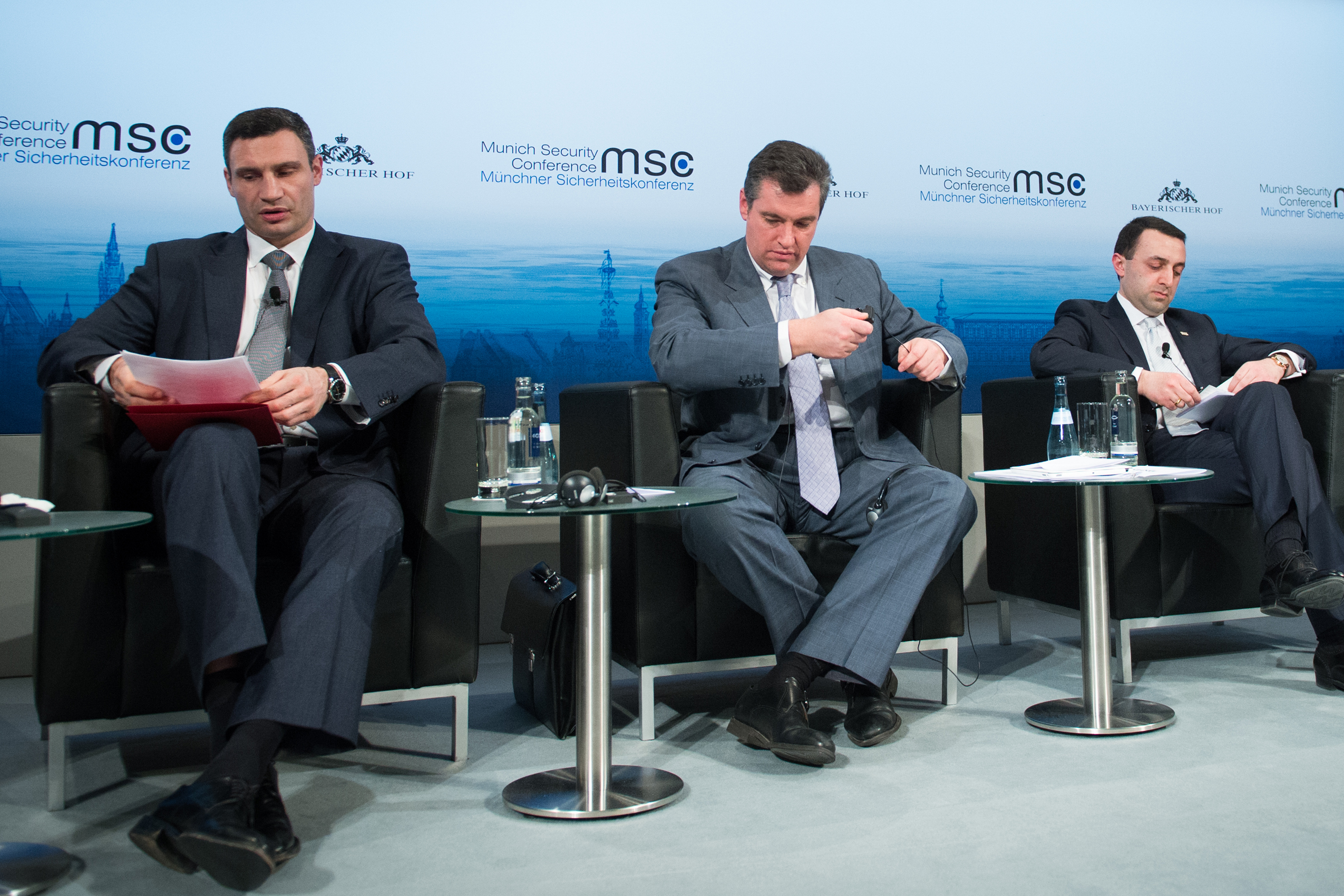
Vitali Klitschko, Leonid Slutsky and Irakli Garibashvili at the 50th Munich Security Conference 2014.

== Official reactions ==
=== Supranational organisations ===
- European Union — Enlargement Commissioner Štefan Füle stated on 26 November 2013 "I am happy that democracy in Ukraine has reached the moment where the people are free to assemble and express their opinion, particular on the issue which is so relevant for their own future, the future of Ukraine". Members of the European Parliament responsible for the Eastern Partnership policy Elmar Brok and Jacek Saryusz-Wolski warned Ukraine on 26 November not to use force against pro-Europe protestors "Otherwise, there will be serious consequences".

On 30 November, Štefan Füle and EU High Representative Catherine Ashton released a joint statement condemning "the excessive use of force last night by the police in Kyiv to disperse peaceful protesters, who over the last days in a strong and unprecedented manner have expressed their support for Ukraine's political association and economic integration with the EU."

Interfax-Ukraine reported on 9 December that staff of the European Union delegation were present at the rallies on Maidan Nezalezhnosti "monitoring developments there".

President of the European Parliament published a tweet on 9 December that stated "I hope Yanukovych ends his own version of the winter games and starts listening to the legitimate voices coming from Maidan".

Guy Verhofstadt, leader of the Alliance of Liberals and Democrats for Europe Group in the European Parliament, claimed mid January 2014 that Euromaidan "is the largest pro-European demonstration in the history of the European Union".

=== International organisations ===
- UN — Secretary General Ban Ki-moon stated on 3 December "I appeal to all parties to act with restraint, avoid any further violence and to uphold the democratic principles of freedom of expression and peaceful assembly".
- NATO — When asked about "pressure put on Ukraine" the Secretary General of NATO Anders Fogh Rasmussen stated on 28 November "If anyone puts pressure on Ukraine in order to prevent Ukraine from deciding freely on Ukraine's affiliation, its alliances, then this will be in contradiction with the principles to which we all subscribed many years ago, in 1999, when an OSCE document was signed under which each individual country has the right to decide for itself. We're sticking to that principle, and we do hope that all of the other countries that signed that document do the same". Rasmussen stated on 3 December "I strongly condemn the excessive use of police forces we have witnessed in Kyiv. I would expect all NATO partners, including Ukraine, to live up to fundamental democratic principles including freedom of assembly and freedom of expression".

On 3 December, a meeting of the foreign ministers of NATO member states issued a statement condemning "the use of excessive force against peaceful demonstrators in Ukraine" and requested that "all parties [...] refrain from provocations and violence." The assembled ministers "urge Ukraine, as the holder of the Chairmanship in Office of the OSCE, to fully abide by its international commitments and to uphold the freedom of expression and assembly. We urge the government and the opposition to engage in dialogue and launch a reform process." Furthermore, "Our [NATO–Ukraine] partnership will continue on the basis of the values of democracy, human rights and the rule of law."

- OSCE — OSCE Representative on Freedom of the Media Dunja Mijatović stated on 2 December her concern of the amount of violence used against the media during the demonstrations.
- Council of Europe — CoE Committee on prevention of torture (CPT) found a deliberate ill-treatment during apprehension of protesters of Euromaidan.

=== States ===
- Australia – Foreign Minister Julie Bishop urged (on 12 December 2013) the Ukrainian authorities to exercise utmost restraint with regard to the protests, to ensure Ukraine's international commitments to the freedoms of assembly and expression are fully upheld, and "to listen to the voices and aspirations of the Ukrainian people".
- Bulgaria – President Rosen Plevneliev advised (on 29 November 2013) Ukrainian politicians to "listen to the voice of the people," referring to large protests against the decision in Ukraine.
- Canada – Foreign Affairs Minister John Baird made an official statement on 30 November, "Canada strongly condemns the deplorable use of violence today by Ukrainian authorities against peaceful protesters in Independence Square. These demonstrators simply want a closer association with the European Union. Freedom of speech and freedom of assembly are fundamental tenets of any truly democratic country. We call upon the Government of Ukraine to respect and indeed protect the rights of its citizens to express their opinions freely, consistent with Organization for Security and Co-operation in Europe principles. Canada stands with the people of Ukraine to build a society based on freedom, democracy, human rights and the rule of law."

On 4 December, Foreign Minister Baird met with "opposition officials and civil society representatives" while in Kyiv for the OSCE security group summit and stated the Canadian government is "engaged here because Ukraine matters, because Canada believes in the values of the Ukrainian people and we want to do all we can to support them in their aspirations. [...] We believe the decision represents a significant lost opportunity in Ukraine's path towards strengthened democratic development and economic prosperity", concluding that Canada is "committed to work with the people of Ukraine in its democratic development and that's a long-term commitment." Baird also reaffirmed that the Canadian government would send "two dozen" election observers to the 15 December repeat elections to the Verkhovna Rada. On 5 December, before leaving Kyiv, John Baird visited the Euromaidan protests in Maidan Nezalezhnosti.

While in Pretoria to view the lying in state of Nelson Mandela on 11 December, Prime Minister Stephen Harper released a statement condemning the actions of the Berkut against the Euromaidan protesters early that morning as "undemocratic and excessive" and "particularly troubling". In the statement, Harper said "Canada and the international community expect Ukrainian authorities to respect and protect the rights of its citizens, including the right to express their opinions freely", adding "Canada stands with the Ukrainian people during this difficult time and we will continue to forcefully oppose all efforts to repress their rights and freedoms", concluding that the Canadian government "and like minded allies will be monitoring developments closely and considering all options at our disposal."

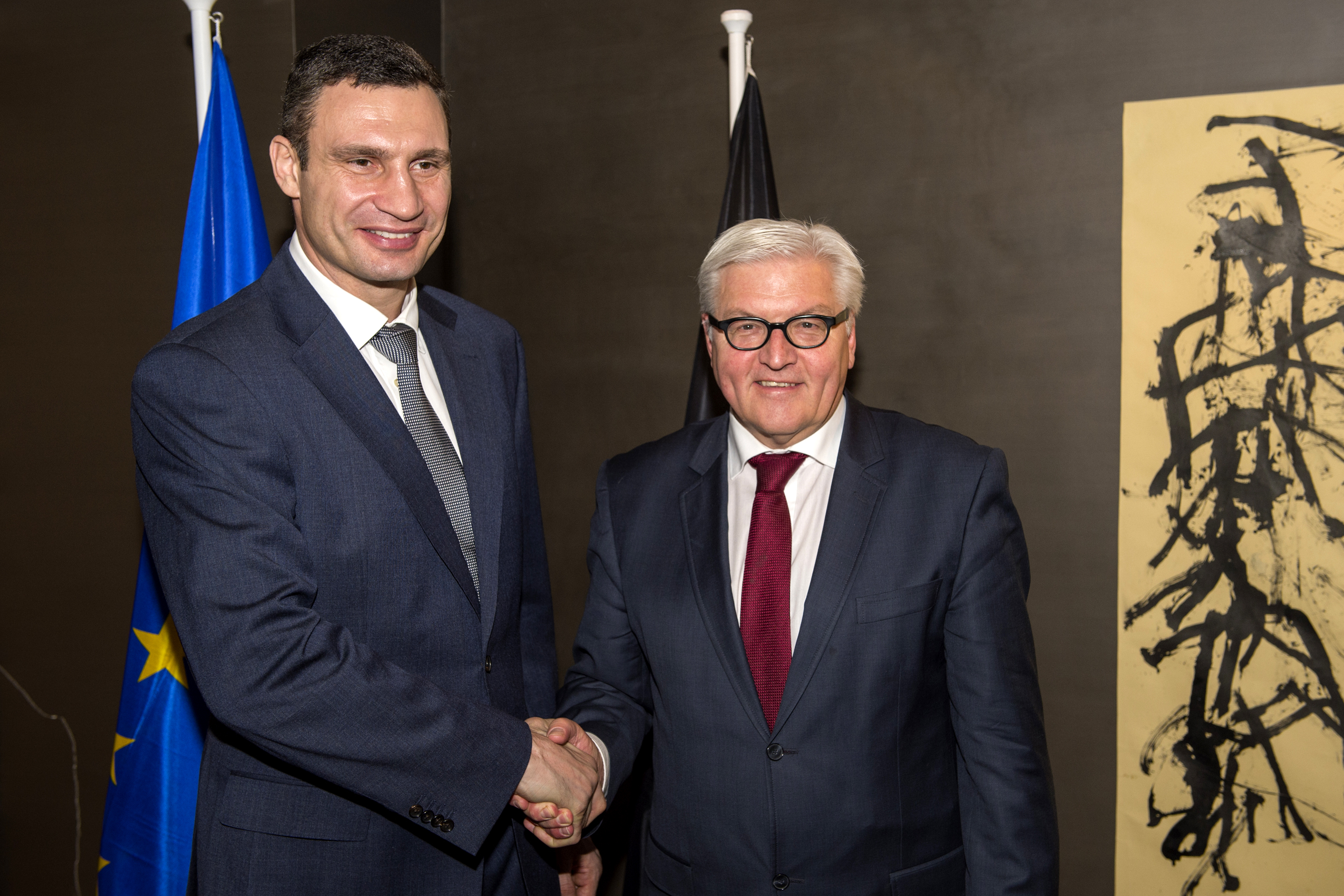
Ukrainian opposition leader Vitali Klitschko meeting German Foreign Minister Frank-Walter Steinmeier at the Munich Security Conference 2014.

- Colombia – Foreign Ministry, on behalf of the Government, released a press release stating "deep concern about the situation in Ukraine" while also deploring the "acts of violence that have taken place in the last couple of days. In the same press statement, Colombia urged the Government of Ukraine to "guarantee security, human rights, and the fundamental liberties of its citizens".
- Germany – Chancellor Angela Merkel commented on 27 November "The EU and Germany have to talk to Russia. The Cold War is over". At the 28–29 November 2013 EU summit, where originally it was planned that the Association Agreement would be signed on 29 November 2013,) Merkel remarked to President Yanukovych "We see you here, but we expected more". Foreign minister Guido Westerwelle stated on 2 December the huge rallies showed "the heart of Ukrainian people beats in a European way".

On 18 December, the day after a financial agreement between Ukraine and Russia was signed, Merkel stated "The offer remains on the table" and the new Foreign Minister Frank-Walter Steinmeier stated "It is utterly scandalous how Russia used Ukraine's economic problems for its own ends, as well as to prevent the signing of the Association Agreement with the EU... Of course, violent actions of the Ukrainian security forces against peaceful demonstrators were also scandalous".

On 4 February 2014, Steinmeier said in an interview with ARD that if the Ukrainian authorities do not find a political solution to the crisis "I think we must now show sanctions as a threat [against Ukraine]".

- Hungary – On 5 December, Secretary of State for Foreign Affairs Zsolt Németh decried the violence, especially that committed by state authorities, and maintained that no state has the right to intervene in the affairs of other states.
- Israel – The Israeli embassy in Ukraine issued a statement, "Israel highly appraises the Ukrainian government's fight against anti-Semitism and hopes that it will strongly condemn and prevent such attacks."
- Latvia – Foreign Affairs Minister Edgars Rinkevics tweeted: "Disturbing news from Ukraine, I condemn police violence against proeuropean demonstration in Kyiv."
- Lithuania – President Dalia Grybauskaitė said (11 December) that "The application of force against peaceful protesters in Kyiv is unjustifiable. It is a direct responsibility of Ukraine's political leadership", Prime Minister Algirdas Butkevičius stated (10 December) "On behalf of the Lithuanian Government, I express concern to the Government of Ukraine over the situation in the country with military forces drawn to the centre of Kyiv and the pending threat of the use of force against unarmed civilians, also I urge the Prime Minister of Ukraine to take a responsible consideration of the situation and start a dialogue with the opposition as soon as possible to reach a peaceful solution"

In March 2014 Žygimantas Pavilionis, the Lithuanian ambassador to the United States, said in an interview for the LRT TV programme "Savaitė", that "After all, what happened in Ukraine's Maidan and generally in the whole country, I personally call the second demolition of the Berlin Wall. For the first time the Slavic state defended the right to freedom entirely voluntarily. This is a serious transformation and serious hope that living in the East and in the West will be the same. I strongly believe that Russia, which is a European country, the Russians as a part of the European civilization, sooner or later will follow this path."

- Poland – Polish Foreign Minister Radoslaw Sikorski said that "President Yanukovych is miscalculating badly as regards the Association Agreement with EU and towards the people of Ukraine."

On 4 February 2014, Sikorski said in an interview with Die Presse that "While the dialogue continues in Ukraine, we should not apply sanctions under any circumstances"; but added that existing EU anti-corruption laws could be used to "verify the origin of funds of politically exposed persons".

- Russia – On 22 November 2013, President Vladimir Putin accused the EU of blackmailing Ukraine to sign the Association Agreement, "including promoting the holding of mass protests". Following the police crackdown and riots on 30 November – 1 December Putin stated, "The events in Ukraine seem more like a pogrom than a revolution"; he also believed "It has little to do with Ukraine's relations with the European Union". Putin further blamed "outside actors" for the protests, which he saw as an attempt to unsettle Ukraine's "legitimate" rulers. On Russia Today, Putin stated "Ukrainian opposition either not in control of situation or serves as cover-up for extremist activities".

Foreign Minister Sergey Lavrov stated on 5 December "other nations should not interfere in Ukraine's political turmoil".

The State Duma adopted a resolution on 12 December, saying "Unauthorized meetings, the siege of agencies of state power, seizures of administrative buildings, rampages, and destruction of the monuments of history lead up to a destabilization in the country and are fraught with ominous economic and political consequences for the people of Ukraine. Overt interference of foreign officials in the affairs of the sovereign Ukraine that stands at variance with any international norms causes particular concern. Some Western politicians who address oppositionist meetings make explicit calls for revolting against the decisions passed by the legitimately elected authorities of the country. They thus make a destructive contribution to the deterioration of the political situation".

During his (12 December) 2013 annual address to the Federal Assembly of Russia, President Putin stated he hoped Ukraine would find a political solution to the current crisis and when speaking about Ukraine's joining the Customs Union of Belarus, Kazakhstan, and Russia he stated "We do not push anything on anyone but if our friends have a wish to work together, then we are prepared to continue this work at the level of experts". (Note: President Putin also said in this speech "Our integration project is based on equal rights and real economic interests, I'm sure achieving Eurasian integration will only increase interest (in it) from our other neighbors, including from our Ukrainian partners ... I hope that all political sides can successfully reach an agreement in the interests of the Ukrainian people".)

On 12 December, Prime Minister Dmitry Medvedev warned of a "tectonic split" threatening the existence of Ukraine as a state.

On 14 December, Foreign Minister Lavrov stated in an interview with Russia-24 that Euromaidan "doesn't fit into the framework of normal human analysis. I have no doubt that provocateurs are behind it. The fact that our Western partners seem to have lost their sense of reality makes me very sad". He also alluded that the western world reactions to the protest had been ideological: "Those who... set severing our neighbours from us – even if it was artificial and by using blackmail – as the main goal of the eastern partnership project saw that it's not that easy".

On 21 December 2013, Foreign Minister Sergey Lavrov stated that "Members of several European governments rushed to the Maidan without any invitation and took part in anti-government demonstrations" and that it "is simply indecent." In reference to the recent violence, Lavrov said the "situation is getting out of control".

On 3 February 2014, the Russian Foreign Ministry stated "We expect the opposition in Ukraine to avoid threats and ultimatums and step up dialogue with the authorities in order to finding a constitutional way out of the country's deep crisis".

- Sweden – Swedish ambassador to Ukraine, Andreas von Beckerath, wrote on Twitter, "Very disturbing reports on police brutality at Maidan. Violence against peaceful demonstrators [is] unacceptable and opposite of EU-integration." Sweden's Foreign Affairs Minister Carl Bildt tweeted that the "Repression against pro-EU manifestations in Kiev [is] deeply worrying."
- United Kingdom – David Lidington, the Minister of State for Europe, issued a statement on 30 November saying he "was very concerned to hear reports of police violence being used to break up a peaceful demonstration in Kyiv in the early hours of this morning. I am aware that further demonstrations are planned this weekend. I urge the Ukrainian authorities to respect the right of peaceful protest and to investigate thoroughly why police violence was used today."

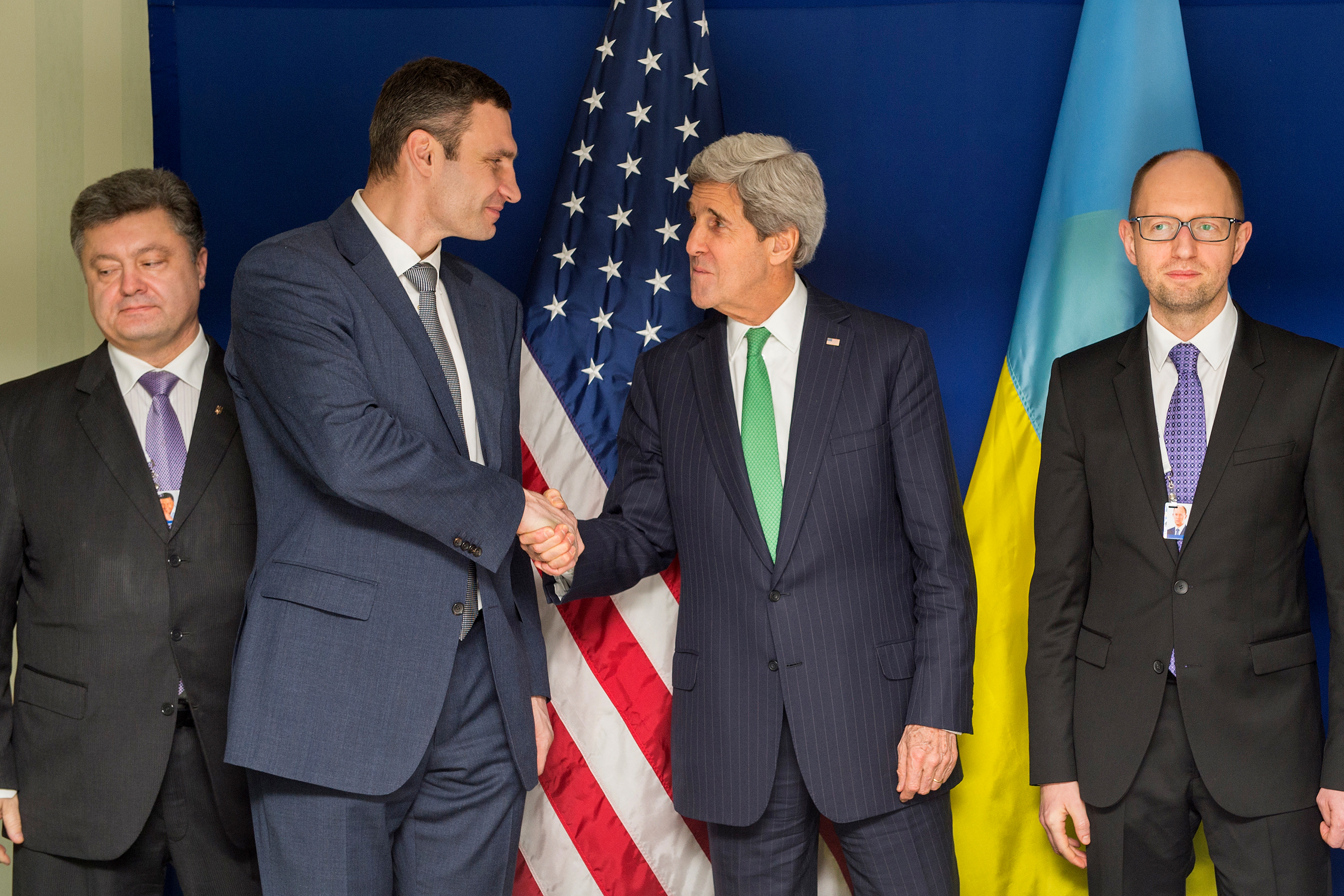
Ukrainian opposition leaders Petro Poroshenko, Vitali Klitschko and Arseniy Yatsenyuk meeting United States Secretary of State John Kerry at the Munich Security Conference 2014.

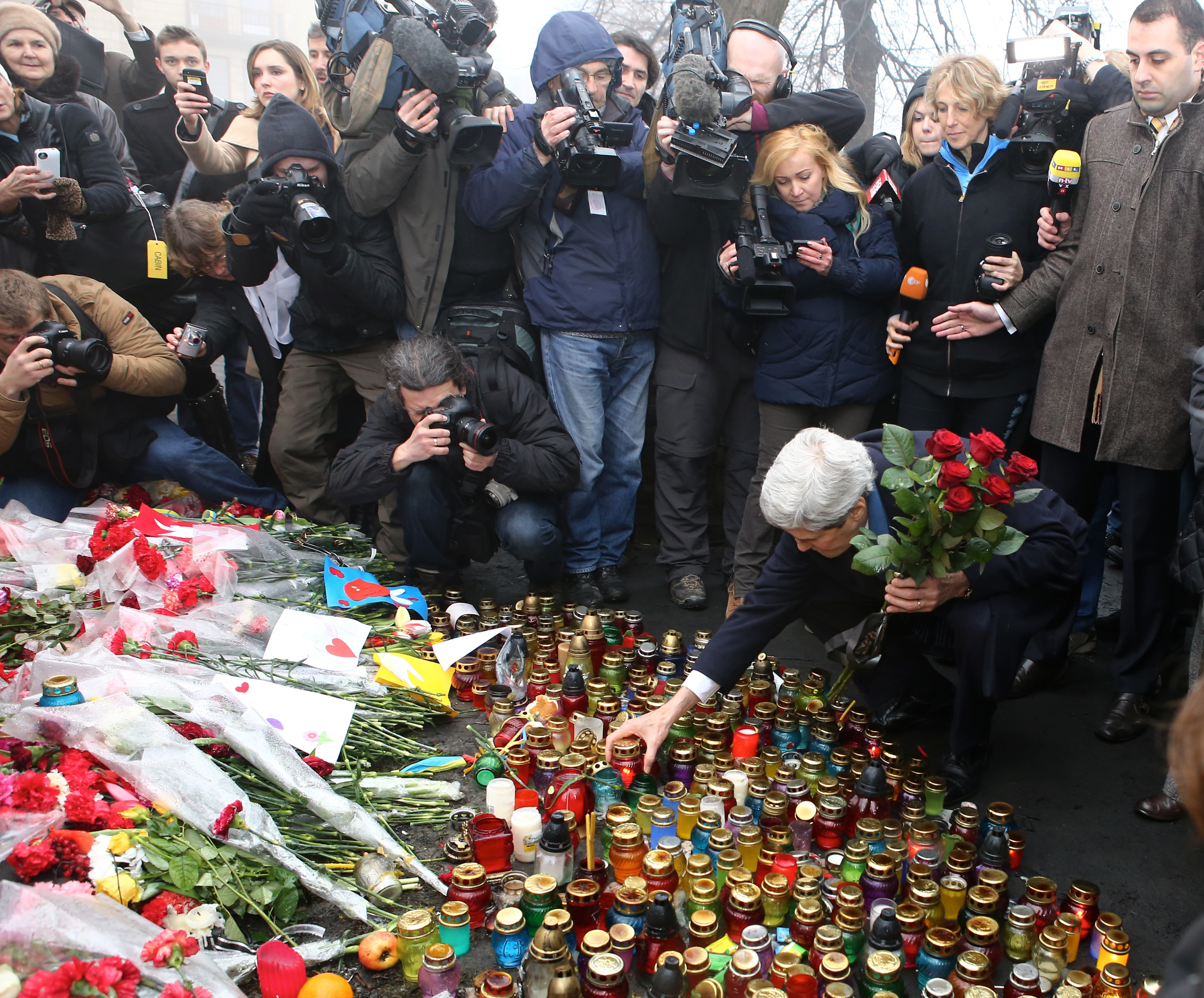
U.S. Secretary of State John Kerry places roses atop the Shrine of the Fallen in Kyiv

- United States – Secretary of State John Kerry stated on 28 November, the first day of the Eastern Partnership Summit in Vilnius, "Average citizens of each member country – Armenia, Azerbaijan, Belarus, Ukraine and Georgia – play a prominent role in the continuing integration with the international community and this is very important". After attacks on journalists on 29 November U.S. Ambassador to Ukraine Geoffrey R. Pyatt tweeted "We strongly support the right to freedom of speech, press and assembly, and condemn today's attack on Ukrainian journalists," and on Voice of America radio, warned about serious consequences for the use of force by the government against protesters in support for Ukraine's European integration in Kyiv. On 2 December, White House Press Secretary Jay Carney said that the White House did not consider those demonstrations in Ukraine to be coup attempts, and stated "the violence by government authorities against peaceful demonstrators in Kyiv on Saturday [30 November] morning was unacceptable". On 3 December he added "Violence and intimidation should have no place in today's Ukraine. We continue to support the aspirations of the Ukrainian people to achieve a prosperous European democracy. European integration is the surest course to economic growth and to strengthening Ukraine's democracy".

United States Secretary of State John Kerry issued a statement on the morning of 11 December during the clashes between police and protesters, saying "For weeks, we have called on President Yanukovych and his government to listen to the voices of his people who want peace, justice and a European future," Kerry said. "Instead, Ukraine's leaders appear tonight to have made a very different choice. We call for utmost restraint. Human life must be protected. Ukrainian authorities bear full responsibility for the security of the Ukrainian people. As church bells ring tonight amidst the smoke in the streets of Kyiv, the United States stands with the people of Ukraine. They deserve better." In December 2013, Victoria Nuland, the assistant secretary of state for European and Eurasian affairs, said in a speech to the US–Ukraine Foundation that the U.S. had invested over $5 billion on democratic skills and institutions, civic participation, and good governance in Ukraine since 1991, stating that these were preconditions for Ukraine to achieve its European aspirations.

U.S. President Barack Obama said in February 2014 that America hopes that negotiations with Ukraine's officials and political opposition will lead to "some sort of democratic process that creates a government with greater legitimacy and unity."

== Unofficial reactions ==
=== Leaked US State Department phone call ===
On 4 February 2014, a YouTube post revealed a phone conversation between Victoria Nuland, Assistant Secretary of State for European and Eurasian Affairs, and Geoffrey R. Pyatt, United States Ambassador to Ukraine, in which they discussed President Yanukovych's offer of cabinet positions to opposition leaders Vitali Klitschko and Arseniy Yatsenyuk. Nuland expressed frustration with the European Union during the call, saying "fuck the EU", and said that she wanted one of the opposition leaders to accept the offer, while saying the other was too inexperienced. Both later declined the offer.

=== Fight in Georgian parliament ===
In December 2013, a proposal of opposition deputy Giorgi Baramidze in the Parliament of Georgia "to encourage supporters of Ukraine's European integration with a special resolution and to condemn the violence on participants of peaceful rallies in Kiev" was met by counter demands by representatives of the parliamentary majority "that deputies of the former ruling party United National Movement should give a political assessment of forceful dispersals of the Georgian opposition rallies in Tbilisi in 2007 and 2011". The dispute between deputies escalated into a brawl, in which no one sustained serious injuries. On 21 February 2014, during President Giorgi Margvelashvili's annual address, the Georgian lawmakers observed a minute of silence to honor the victims of violence in Kyiv, with Ukrainian flags on display on the desks of many members of parliament.

=== Non-governmental organisations ===
- Amnesty International – Researcher on Ukraine, Heather McGill, stated that 30 November police actions against demonstrators was "a shameful disregard for peoples right to peacefully protest. In choosing to violently disperse the demonstration early this morning the Ukrainian authorities are violating the very standards and values towards which they claim to be aspiring." On 6 December the organization started a global action to ensure fair trial for (during Euromaidan) detained Ukrainian protesters.
- Association of Ukrainians in Great Britain – Called for "a protest condemning the decision of the Ukrainian government to halt the EU integration process" to be held near the Houses of Parliament in London on 23 November at noon; also called for protestors to confront the Ambassador of Ukraine to the United Kingdom after an official ceremony commemorating the Holodomor later that afternoon at London's Ukrainian Orthodox Church.
- Reporters Without Borders – "Reporters Without Borders is appalled by the scale of the violence against journalists during the pro-European demonstrations in Kiev [...] The frequency and gravity of the attacks on journalists indicate a deliberate desire to crush freedom of information [...]".
- Transparency International – "If you look at what is happening in Ukraine these days. They just don't want to accept what the government does. They want to take this European vector of development also because in doing so, they would become more transparent and the corruption would become much, much less in the country."
- Ukrainian Congress Committee of America – Issued a statement that "denounces the brutal barbaric attack on the peaceful demonstrators", and stated "We call upon the US government and its EU allies to immediately reiterate their support for the Ukrainian people and their aspirations to join the European community of democracies. We further call on immediate economic sanctions which will include freezing of assets and visa restrictions for Yanukovych and his government."
- Ukrainian Canadian Congress – Also issued a statement denouncing the violence used by authorities on protesters, and stated "We ask all western governments to immediately impose targeted, economic sanctions against those individuals responsible for these human rights abuses in Ukraine, including the freezing of assets and restrictions on visas."

=== Non-Ukrainian political parties and politicians ===
- European Democratic Party MEPs, including Nathalie Griesbeck and Marielle de Sarnez visited Kyiv on 7 December, stating "Europeans and Ukrainians have a common future, a common destiny. The European Union has to support Ukrainians who demonstrate for closer relationship with Europe". EDP delegation also met opposition leaders, such as Mykola Katerynchuk, leader of the European Party of Ukraine.
- European People's Party leaders, including former President of the European Parliament Jerzy Buzek visited Kyiv on 7 & 8 December "to express the support of the EPP family for the Ukrainian people and their European aspirations in light of the Euromaidan protests". They also met with opposition politicians.
- Jaroslaw Kaczynski, leader of Poland's largest opposition party Law and Justice, stated his intent along with other party members to travel to Kyiv on 1 December, stating "We believe that the response of the whole European Union is needed, but especially Poland's response. All major political forces in Poland have to speak out as Ukraine stands at a crossroads today. It's not just about the issues related to the European Union, it is a much deeper rooted problem. We are determined to support everything that leads Ukraine to Europe, everything that will strengthen and support Ukraine's democracy," calling on Radoslaw Sikorski, Polish Minister of Foreign Affairs; Carl Bildt, Swedish Minister of Foreign Affairs; Aleksander Kwasniewski and Pat Cox, both members of the European Parliament monitoring mission to join.
- Stanislav Aranovich, Leader of the Narodnaya Party of Russia, made on 3 December a statement that Russia, as a part of the CIS, (Note: Ukraine is not a member of the CIS. Although Ukraine was one of the three founding countries and ratified the Creation Agreement in December 1991, Ukraine chose not to ratify the CIS Charter. In 1993 Ukraine became an "Associate Member" of the CIS.) is obliged to support the Government of Ukraine against the opposition, down to military intervention by sending Russian Interior Ministry forces to help their Ukrainian colleagues.
- Republican Party of Russia co-leader Boris Nemtsov said on behalf of his party on 2 December: "We support Ukraine's course toward European integration [...] By supporting Ukraine, we also support ourselves." Four St. Petersburg regional branch representatives of the Republican Party of Russia – PFP visited Kyiv and joined Euromaidan protesters in Maidan Nezalezhnosti on 9 December because they "felt the emotional impulse to go there and back supporters of Ukraine's association agreement with the EU".
- United States Senator John McCain issued on 3 December a statement saying "The eyes of the world are on Ukraine. Ukraine's leaders should respect their people's basic rights, including freedom of expression and assembly, and refrain from acts of violence against peaceful demonstrators [...] Ukrainians should not be forced to choose between a future in the west or the east. They should be free to chart their nation's future as they choose, in the best interest of Ukraine's citizens.". McCain visited the Maidan and gave a speech there on 15 December Senator McCain at Euromaidan, 15 December 2013
- Former President of Georgia Mikheil Saakashvili delivered a speech on Euromaidan in Kyiv on 7 December. He said "Victory in Ukraine will put an end to the Putin regime, and they'll write in history books that the Russian Empire ceased to exist on the Euromaidan". In January he said, "What we have been witnessing in Ukraine, [...] is the first geopolitical revolution of the 21st century."
- Andrei Dmitriyev, head of The Other Russia Party's St. Petersburg regional branch, stated on 10 December he believed that the demonstrations (in Ukraine) were directed against Russia by people "who wipe their feet on the Soviet flag and topple Lenin monuments" and added "Both Russians and most Ukrainians do not like that. I think that Ukraine is heading toward a split".
- During December, Euromaidan was visited by nationalist leaders from Baltic countries who cooperate with Svoboda, namely National Alliance, Lithuanian Nationalist Union and Conservative People's Party of Estonia. Latvian nationalist Jānis Dombrava compared in his speech the Euromaidan to The Barricades of 1991, while Estonian Mart Helme urged in his address Ukrainian patriots not to succumb to Russian demands.
- The Communist Party of the Russian Federation published a series of photos of lynched dissidents and corpses, juxtaposed with photos of Ukraine's opposition leaders with the caption "Eurointegration 1991-2013" on 5 December 2013 under the title "Penalty for Eurointegration in 1946" . On 24 January, they posted on their Moscow branch website that the Berkut are heroes of Ukraine.

=== Religious leaders ===
- Pope Francis, he stated speaking to pilgrims gathered in St. Peter's Square in Vatican City on 26 January 2014, is praying for the victims in Ukraine in (then) recent days, and wished for a constructive dialogue between the government and the public.

== Solidarity demonstrations and protests ==
=== Euromaidans worldwide ===
Smaller protests or Euromaidans were also organized starting on 24 November by Ukrainians and local citizens of Ukrainian descent in countries such as Poland, the United Kingdom, Germany, France, Italy, Sweden, Austria, the Czech Republic, Bulgaria, the United States and Canada. More than one hundred Ukrainians had gathered in Prague to support Euromaidan in Ukraine. Conspicuously absent were non Ukrainian radical leftist organized demonstrations supporting Euromaidan.

Similar events were reported on 26 November in Warsaw, Kraków, Łódź, Poznań, Wrocław, Katowice, Lublin, Rzeszów, Olsztyn, Elbląg, Zamość, Biały Bór, London, Paris, Munich, Berlin, Frankfurt, Stuttgart, Budapest, Oslo, Bergen, Stockholm, Malmö, Lund, Vienna, Bratislava, Vilnius, Tbilisi, Toronto (150), Winnipeg (100+), Saskatoon, Edmonton (150), Cleveland (Parma), Sofia, and The Hague. Simultaneous support events were organized by Baltic nationalist youth movements on 3 December in Tallinn, Riga and Vilnius. And one in Amsterdam on 7 December.

In Vienna, hundreds came with banners to support the rapprochement between Ukraine and the EU. In London, the gathered Ukrainian community chanted the slogan "Ukraine to Europe".

In Sofia, Ukrainians in Bulgaria and Bulgarian citizens have called a rally for 27 November in support of pro-EU protesters in Ukraine. Bulgarian organizers have suggested a bond between Ukrainian protesters and anti-government protesters in Bulgaria, who have been calling for the resignation of left-wing PM Plamen Oresharski since mid-June. According to them, both nations must unite against "ever-hungry oligarchs who forcibly push us towards Russia."

In Armenia, on 2 December, hundreds of people marched through the capital Yerevan to denounce a visit of Russian President Vladimir Putin and to express their solidarity with the pro-European rallies in Ukraine. (Note: They also protested against Armenia's decision in September 2013 to pull out of an Association Agreement with the EU and instead to join the Customs Union of Belarus, Kazakhstan, and Russia.) Local media reported that 100 participants were arrested by police.

On 1 and 2 December, rallies were held in several Canadian cities, including Vancouver, Calgary, Edmonton (250 protesters), Saskatoon (100+), Regina, Winnipeg, Toronto, Ottawa, and Montreal. Protests were also held in the American cities of New York City (200+) Chicago (200+), Philadelphia (40), Miami (50), and Warren, Michigan (bordering Detroit).

On 8 December, Euromaidan solidarity rallies occurred in many North American cities, including New York (1000+), San Francisco (500+), Chicago, Boston, Philadelphia, Miami, San Diego. On 30 December, Niagara Falls was lit blue and yellow while a rally was held.

In Tashkent on 27 January, several activists gathered in front of Ukrainian embassy, supporting Euromaidan, waving flags of Ukraine, Georgia and Ukrainian Insurgent Army. They were detained by police.

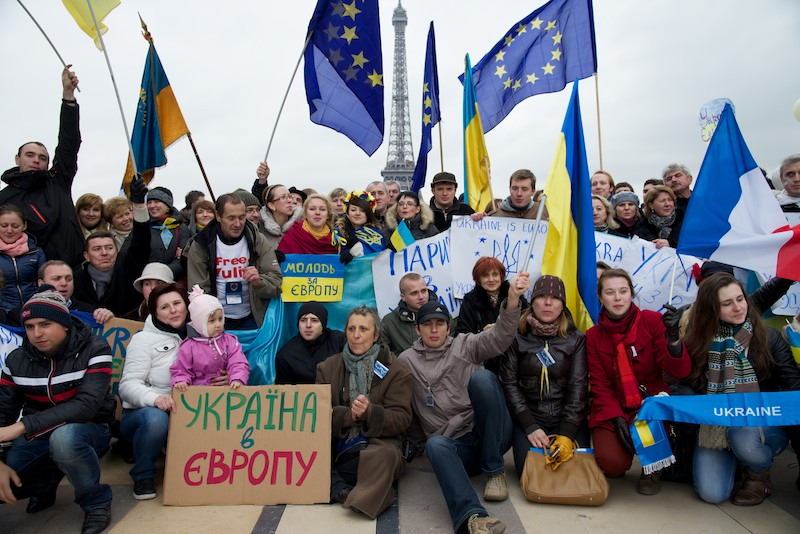
Euromaidan in Paris (24 November 2013)

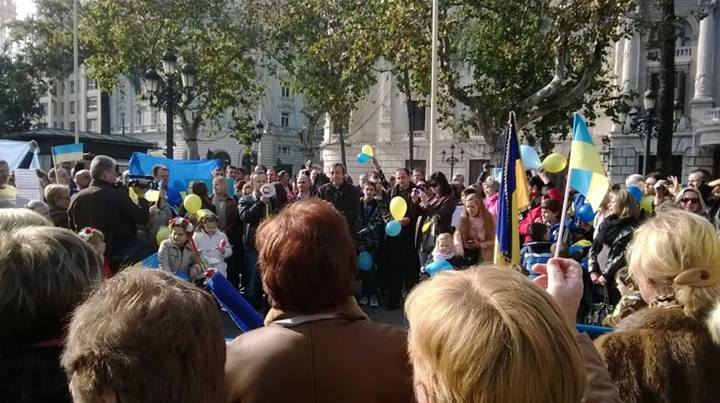
Euromaidan in Valencia (10 December 2013)

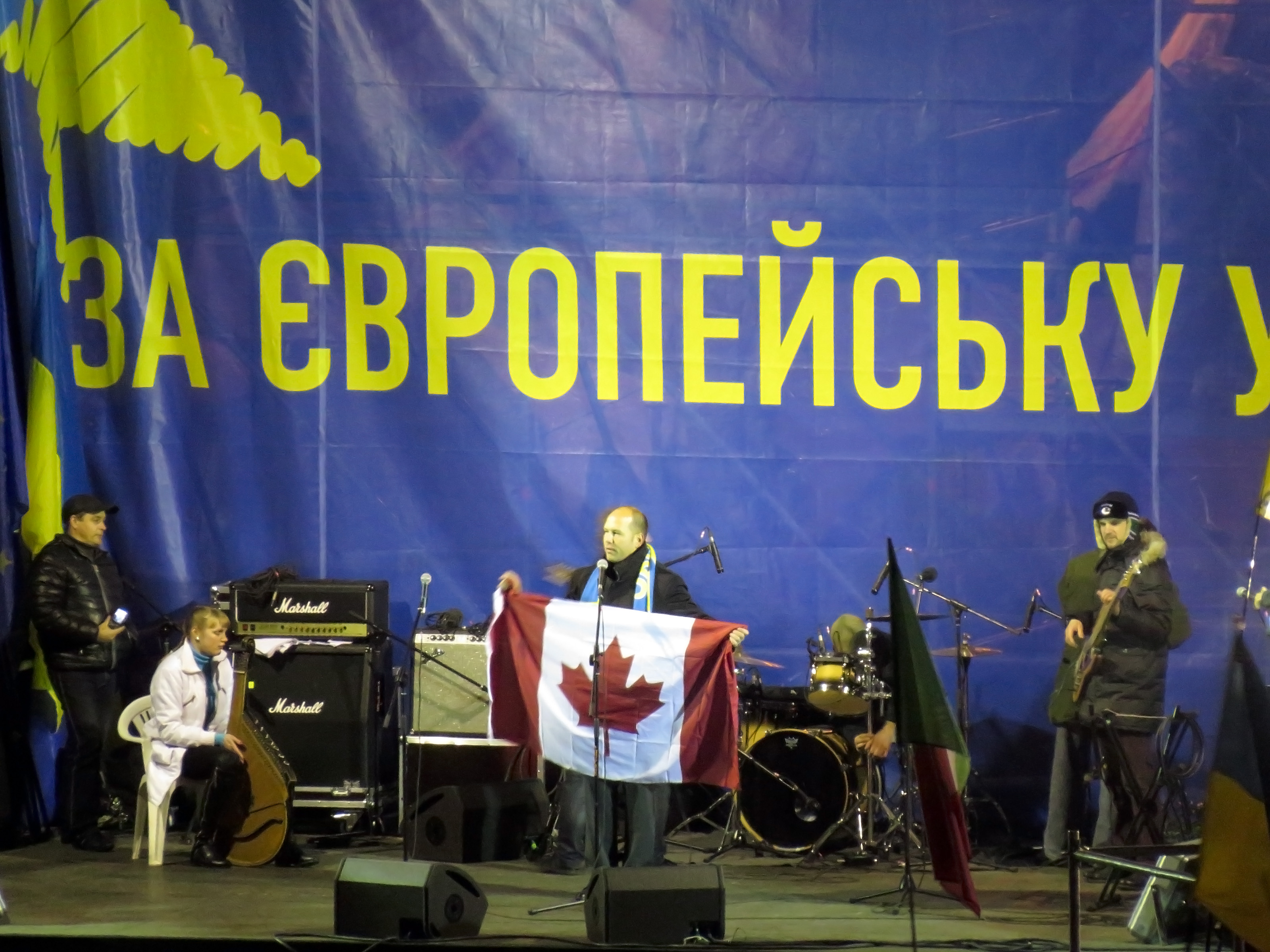
Canadian Minister of Foreign Affairs John Baird attends Euromaidan

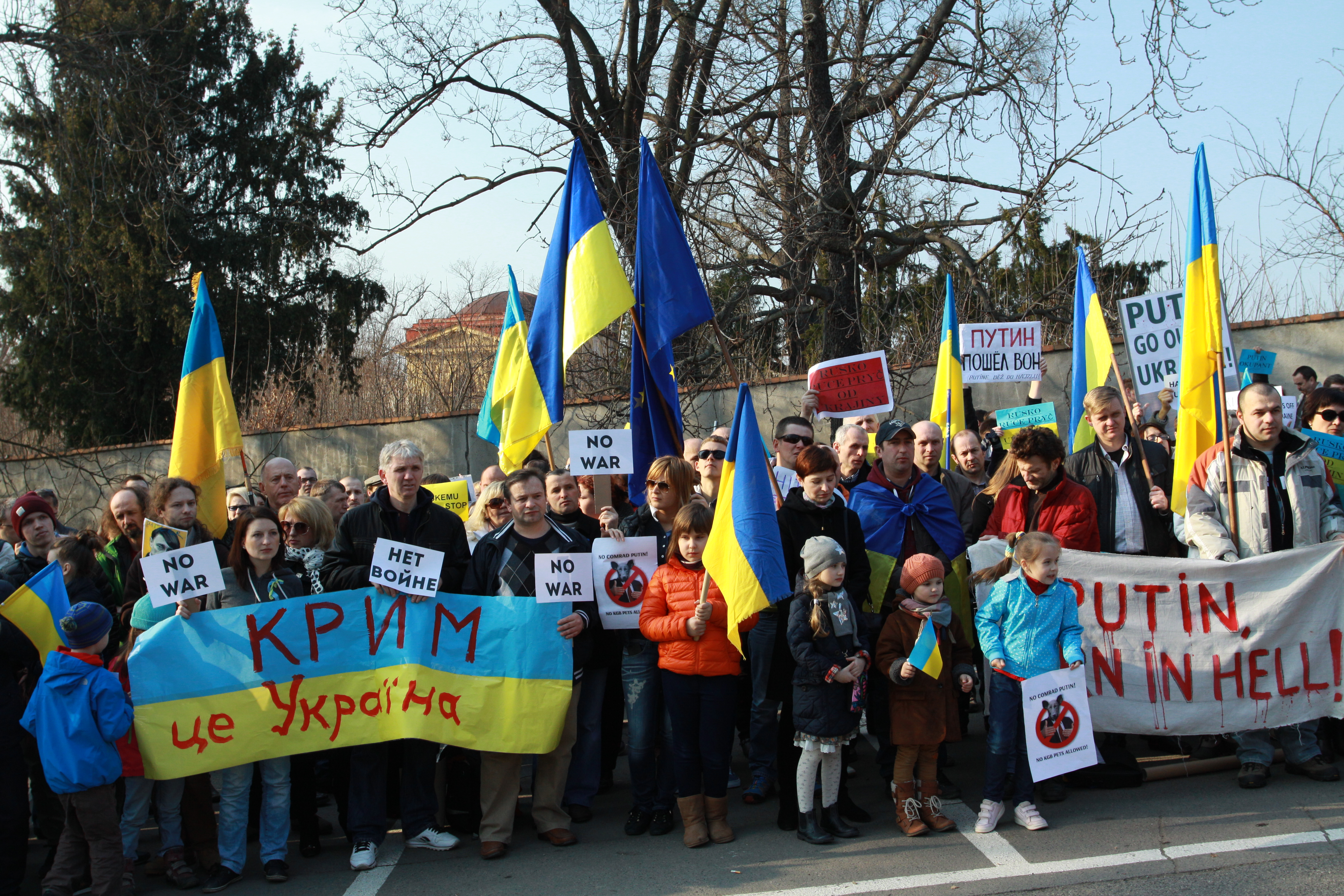
Euromaidan in Prague (2 March 2014)

=== Polish and Ukrainian human chain ===
On 29 November 2013, on the Polish-Ukrainian border crossing in Medyka, Poles and Ukrainians created a human chain as a symbol of a solidarity between the two nations, and as a sign of support for pro-EU protesters in Ukraine.

=== Demonstrations supporting Euromaidan in Russia ===
On 2 December, supporters picketed the Embassy of Ukraine in Moscow holding a banner reading "Ukraine, we are with you". 11 participants, including Yaroslavl Oblast Legislative Assembly member Boris Nemtsov, were detained by police and later released on grounds of "violating procedure". On 5 December, a rally in support of Euromaidan was also held in St. Petersburg.

=== Illumination of buildings ===
In December 2013, Warsaw's Palace of Culture and Science, Buffalo Electric Vehicle Company Tower in Buffalo, Cira Centre in Philadelphia, and the Tbilisi City Assembly in Georgia were illuminated in blue and yellow as a symbol of solidarity with Ukraine.

== Political experts ==
- Alexander J. Motyl, in an open letter to the president, called for his resignation: "In marching in the streets of Kyiv, Lviv, and other cities, Ukrainians have demonstrated that, after three years of your predations, they have not lost their spirit, dignity, and desire for freedom. They have shown that you have lost and that your attempt to build a gangster state has failed. Permit me to inform you that they have demoted you from president of Ukraine to the provisional occupant of the presidency of Ukraine. You should act accordingly and resign." In commenting on the political situation surrounding the protests, he stated, "The fact of the matter is that you have maneuvered yourself into a hopeless position. You have no allies in the world. You have minimal support in Ukraine. The economy is on the verge of collapse. The government is ineffective. Your regime is cracking. Your rule is evaporating. You know better than anyone that violence is not an option. The army and militia are unreliable, the internal troops are untested, and the special forces are too few. Do you really want to risk provoking a civil war that could destroy the country and that you will not be able to win?"
- Taras Kuzio – Less than 24 hours after the Ukrainian government decree suspended preparations for signing of the association agreement, political analyst Dr. Taras Kuzio taped an analysis with UkeTube, saying "If 100,000 Ukrainians don't protest, we'll fail. Moldova managed to mobilize thousands of people on the streets in support of EU integration. If they can do it, Ukraine is also able to do it." In subsequent video analysis with UkeTube, Kuzio says that "Yanukovych is not longer Ukraine's future" and submits that Yanukovych is neither "pro-European nor pro-Russian, he is only pro-Yanukovych." Kuzio echoes Yulia Mostova, Editor of Dzerkalo Tyzhnya, saying that Yanukovych's only goals are "to become the wealthiest man in Ukraine, the most powerful man in Ukraine, and to stay in power as long as possible, if not indefinitely."
- Anders Åslund – "While the democratic opposition seems set to take over, Yanukovych's own camp appears unready to apply harsh methods to suppress their protests. It is difficult to see any way out for Yanukovych [...] The main way out of the current crisis is for the regime to be ousted through defections from its ranks and for a roundtable negotiation to resolve the issues, as was the case during the Orange Revolution in December 2004."
- Timothy D. Snyder, a Yale University historian and specialist in Eastern Europe, commented: "If this is a revolution, it must be one of the most common-sense revolutions in history. But the desire of so many to be able to have normal lives in a normal country is opposed by two fantasies, one of them now exhausted and the other extremely dangerous. The exhausted fantasy is that of Ukraine's geopolitical significance. Ukrainian president Viktor Yanukovych seems to believe, and he is not alone, that because Ukraine lies between the European Union and Russia, each side must have an interest in controlling it, and therefore that smart geopolitics involves turning them against each other [...] The dangerous fantasy is the Russian idea that Ukraine is not really a different country, but rather a kind of Slavic younger brother. This is a legacy of the late Soviet Union and the Russification policies of the 1970s. It has no actual historical basis: East Slavic statehood arose in what is now Ukraine and was copied in Moscow, and the early Russian Empire was itself highly dependent upon educated inhabitants of Ukraine."
- Several, mostly European, political scientists and historians signed a letter to the Editor of The Guardian published on 3 January calling the Euromaidan demonstrations "a model for the defence of civil rights" and called for their governments "to support Ukrainians in their efforts to put an end to a corrupt and brutal regime and to the geopolitical vulnerability of their country."
- George Friedman, the founder of Stratfor, in an interview with Kommersant, was quoted as saying that the events related to the Euromaidan were "the most overt coup in history" and that one of the reasons the coup occurred was that the US wanted to weaken Russia, given that with its intervention in the Syrian crisis, Russia was showing signs of reemerging as a world power. Friedman later said that he was taken out of context and that "it was no coup".
- John Mearsheimer, best known for being a leading figure in the realist school of international relations, wrote in Foreign Affairs that "the Ukraine crisis Is the West's fault", and that "Although the full extent of U.S. involvement has not yet come to light, it is clear that Washington backed the coup."

== Russian media ==
When the existence of protests could no longer be denied, they were presented as a foreign plot. On television and on the Internet, two themes dominate: the Europeans want our historic territory, and the Europeans are gay. Fantasies of sex and domination displace description and analysis.

— Timothy D. Snyder, The New York Review of Books, Ukraine: Putin's Denial

=== Television ===
According to Radio Free Europe/Radio Liberty Russian state television reporting on Euromaidan "has been described as misleading, [and] at times downright odd"; it claimed "Russian television reporters have spared no efforts to portray the protesters as a horde of hooligans funded by the West to topple Yanukovych and sow chaos in Ukraine". A Russia-1 report on 1 December featured an eight-minute long live segment that contained no interviews and almost no additional footage. The reporter said the situation in Kyiv is pure "anarchy," adding that the streets were dangerous, especially for Russians, and said that the protests seem to be orchestrated by Western countries. On the same network, Dmitry Kiselyov (who during the protests was made head of the state news agency) described the Klitschko brothers on 8 December as "gay icons", and demonstrators in Kyiv were accused of surviving off of heated lard and using "ancient African military techniques" against police, and surmised "Under the slogan 'Ukraine is Europe,' life in central Kyiv is becoming more and more archaic." Attempts were made to link alleged "early sex from the age of 9 in Sweden" and pre-pubescent impotence, along with a rise in child abortions, with European integration. Also during a show on Russia-1, it was stated that the protests had been organised by Sweden, Poland and Lithuania "because they were still smarting from Russia's victory at the Battle of Poltava in 1709". "This week the coalition has shown its full strength," Kiselyov said on his weekly talk show, "It looked like a thirst for revenge for Poltava."

During the second week of protests, Russia-24 had made a link between "a sharp deterioration in the political climate in Ukraine" with "the change in the seasons". The station claimed that this was "a bold theory" of scientists at Columbia University (it added "And it appears that their Russian colleagues agree with them") and it advised protesters in Kyiv to go home for the sake of their health, warning of "a sharp rise in acute respiratory viral infections in Kiev". Russian state-owned Perviy Canal (First Channel) reported that only "several hundred people" showed up at the rally on 8 December, and that protests were "dying out", when in reality up to 500,000 attended. It was reported that Russian newscasters in Kyiv have opted to use unbranded microphones, so as to hide their channel's affiliation.

First Channel likened Ukraine's situation to that of Yugoslavia, of which the channel showed footage accompanied by somber music.

Otar Dovzhenko, a TV analyst and professor at Ukrainian Catholic University in Lviv, explained that "Russian media can't hide the protests in Ukraine, so they try to bring them down, make them look undesirable. Discrediting the protests in Ukraine is very important for the regime of President Vladimir Putin. The Orange Revolution of 2004 gave strong inspiration to the opposition in Russia." He also says that Russian media omit the genesis of the Euromaidan protests being the Ukrainian government, which is why foreign interests are usually focused on.

Police estimates of a pro-government rally in Kyiv on 14 December reported a maximum of 60,000.

Channel One Russia presenter and vice-president of Rosneft Mikhail Leontyev stated that "Ukraine is not a country at all, it is a part of our country".

On Russian state television, Andrey Illarionov, a former adviser to Russian president Vladimir Putin, political scientist, is frequently heard discussing preparations for a military invasion, and has stated "Ukraine is a failed state, and the historic chance for reunification of all the Russian lands can be lost in the next couple of weeks, so we mustn't put off the solution to the Ukrainian Question." The phrase "the solution to the Ukrainian Question" is considered to echo Adolf Hitler's Final Solution to the Jewish question.

=== Print ===
Komsomolskaya Pravda led its front page on 10 December with the headline "Ukraine may split into several parts" above a map showing the country's division into four areas. The following day, it ran a front-page headline declaring: "Western Ukraine is preparing for civil war".

== Artists' response ==
- Pyotr Verzilov, the husband of Nadezhda Tolokonnikova, member of the punk group Pussy Riot, took part in the protest in Kyiv.
- Hayden Panettiere, American actress and fiancée of Wladimir Klitschko (brother of Vitali Klitschko), visited the Euromaidan protests in Kyiv on 6 December 2013. She and her fiancée addressed the crowds.
- Belarusian rock band Lyapis Trubetskoy performed (in December 2013) for Euromaidan-protesters in Kyiv, Ukraine.
- George Clooney, American actor, film director, producer, and screenwriter, released a one-minute YouTube video on 9 December in support of Euromaidan in Ukraine.
- Nylon Jail, an alternative country band from Czech Republic played on Maidan Nezalezhnosti to show their support of the cause on 12 December 2013.
- Vera Farmiga, American actress, released a YouTube video on 19 December in support of Euromaidan in Ukraine.
- Arnold Schwarzenegger, American actor and politician, released a YouTube video on 24 January 2014 in support of Euromaidan in Ukraine.
- Sergio Pizzorno, British guitarist, songwriter, member of Kasabian, in support of protesters, sent out a message of solidarity via Kasabian's Twitter page on 20 February 2014.
- Jared Leto, American actor and lead vocalist for Thirty Seconds to Mars, in his speech after winning the best supporting actor Oscar, spoke in support of Ukraine during the 86th Academy Awards ceremony in Los Angeles on 2 March 2014.

== Ban for 36 foreigners to enter Ukraine ==
The newspaper Kommersant Ukraine reported on 24 December 2013 that the Ukrainian Foreign Ministry and the Security Service of Ukraine (SBU) had satisfied an inquiry of Party of Regions MP Oleh Tsariov to deny entry into Ukraine to 36 people. Tsariov himself had told Kommersant Ukraine that they were suspected of "consulting with the opposition to destabilize the situation in the country", and hinted that they would have attempted to organize a revolution (in Ukraine). Among the 36 people were former Georgian President Mikheil Saakashvili, academic Taras Kuzio, member of the expert council of the Verkhovna Rada Committee on European Integration Andreas Umland, Brian Fink, Myron Wasylyk, Alec Ross and Marko Ivkovic. The list was alleged to contain 29 citizens of Georgia, five US citizens and a citizen of Serbia.

== Ukrainian Prime Minister plea for help from EU politicians ==
On 24 January 2014, Ukrainian Prime Minister Mykola Azarov stated in an interview with RBC Information Systems "European politicians could give Ukraine real help in stabilizing the situation" and hinted they should "addressed the Ukrainian opposition and say that the seizure of state organizations and administrative buildings is illegal and contradicts the standards of democracy. And if you pursue such actions, we will not cooperate with you".
