= Oleh Yukhnovskyi =

Ukrainian politician and farmer

Merited Agricultural Worker Oleh Yukhnovskyi
- Олег Юхновський
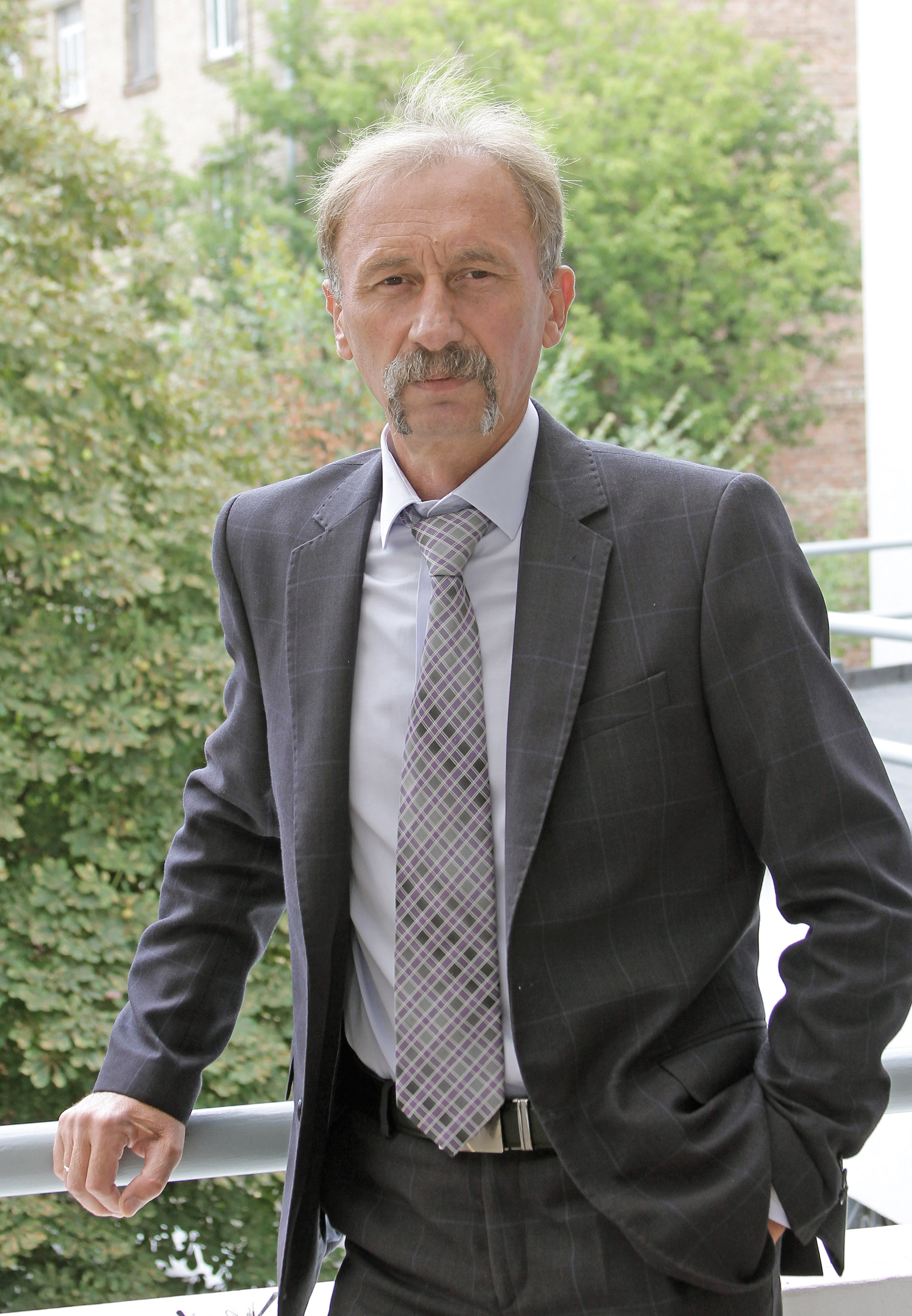
- Yukhnovskyi in 2015

People's Deputy of Ukraine
- In office 29 March 1998 – 25 May 2006
- Preceded by: Constituency established
- Succeeded by: Mykola Katerynchuk (2002)
- Constituency: Vinnytsia Oblast, No. 13 (1998–2002); Yulia Tymoshenko Bloc, No. 19 (2002–2006)

Personal details
- Born: 17 September 1962 (age 64) Korytuvata, Ukrainian SSR, Soviet Union (now Ukraine)
- Party: Independent
- Other political affiliations: Hromada (1998–1999); Batkivshchyna (1999–2002); Yulia Tymoshenko Bloc (2002–2006); For United Ukraine! (2004–2005); People's Party (2005–2006); Socialists (2016–2022)
- Education: Ukrainian Agricultural Academy (KSKhN)

Oleh Ivanovych Yukhnovskyi (Ukrainian: Оле́г Іва́нович Юхно́вський; born 17 September 1962) is a Ukrainian politician and farmer who served as a People's Deputy of Ukraine from 1998 to 2006, first from Ukraine's 13th electoral district and later on the proportional list of the Yulia Tymoshenko Bloc. Prior to his election, he was manager of Samohorodok Farm in Samohorodok. After losing re-election in 2006, he has remained actively involved in agricultural affairs, serving as chairman of the agricultural committee of the Chamber of Commerce of Ukraine.

== Early life and career ==
Oleh Ivanovych Yukhnovskyi was born 17 September 1962 in the village of Korytuvata, in what was then the Soviet Union. From 1979 to 1984 he studied at the Ukrainian Agricultural Academy (now the National University of Life and Environmental Sciences of Ukraine), graduating with a specialisation in mechanical engineering. By 1998, he was manager of Samohorodok Farm, located in Samohorodok.

== Political career ==
Yukhnovskyi was an independent candidate in Ukraine's 13th electoral district, located in Vinnytsia Oblast, during the 1998 Ukrainian parliamentary election. He was successfully elected, and became a People's Deputy of Ukraine. He won re-election in 2002 as the 19th candidate on the proportional list of the Yulia Tymoshenko Bloc.

Yukhnovskyi changed parties a total of seven times during his time in office. After being elected, he joined the Hromada party in May 1998. He left in March 1999, defecting to Batkivshchyna. He remained part of Batkivshchyna and was its chairman in Vinnytsia Oblast until November 2002, when he once again became an independent, before joining the Democratic Initiatives group in December of the same year. He changed his party yet again to become a member of the For United Ukraine! coalition in September 2004 before joining the People's Party a year later.

Yukhnovskyi was heavily involved in agricultural affairs as a People's Deputy. He was a member of the Verkhovna Rada Committee on Agricultural Policies and Land Relations from 1998 to 2002, and was appointed secretary of the Committee in 2002. He was additionally noted by Holos Ukrayiny as a leading voice for agricultural and peasant issues in the Verkhovna Rada (parliament of Ukraine). He criticised the government of Viktor Yushchenko in 2006, arguing that no government was paying sufficient attention to agricultural affairs or

Yukhnovskyi was awarded the title of Honoured Agricultural Worker of Ukraine on 25 March 2005.

Yukhnovskyi ran in the 2006 Ukrainian parliamentary election as a candidate on the proportional list of the Lytvyn Bloc. However, he was not successfully elected.

== Later career ==
Yukhnovskyi was a member of the council of the Socialists party from 2016. He is currently chairman of the agricultural committee within the Chamber of Commerce of Ukraine and has continued to advocate for increased government support to farmers. As chairman, Yukhnovskyi has provided support to smallholders who have refused to lease land to large farms and have instead cultivated it themselves, and he has additionally expressed opposition to bills backed by agribusinesses that would increase taxation on small farms.
