= European Party =

European Party may refer to:

- European Party (Cyprus), a centrist political party in Cyprus founded in 2005
- European Party of Ukraine, a Ukrainian political party
- a European political party, a European political alliance recognised as a political party operating transnationally in Europe and within the institutions of the European Union

== See also ==
- European Democratic Party, a centrist European political party in favour of European integration
- European Green Party, the Green European political party
- European People's Party, a centre-right European political party
- European Workers Party, a Swedish political party
