= Anatolii Hrytsenko =

Anatolii Hrytsenko, Anatoliy Hrytsenko or Anatoliy Grytsenko is a name of several Ukrainian politicians:

- Anatoliy Stepanovych Hrytsenko, a former Minister of Defense of Ukraine
- Anatoliy Pavlovych Hrytsenko, a former chairman of the Supreme Council of Crimea
