= Anatoliy Hrytsenko =

Ukrainian politician

- Анатолій Гриценко
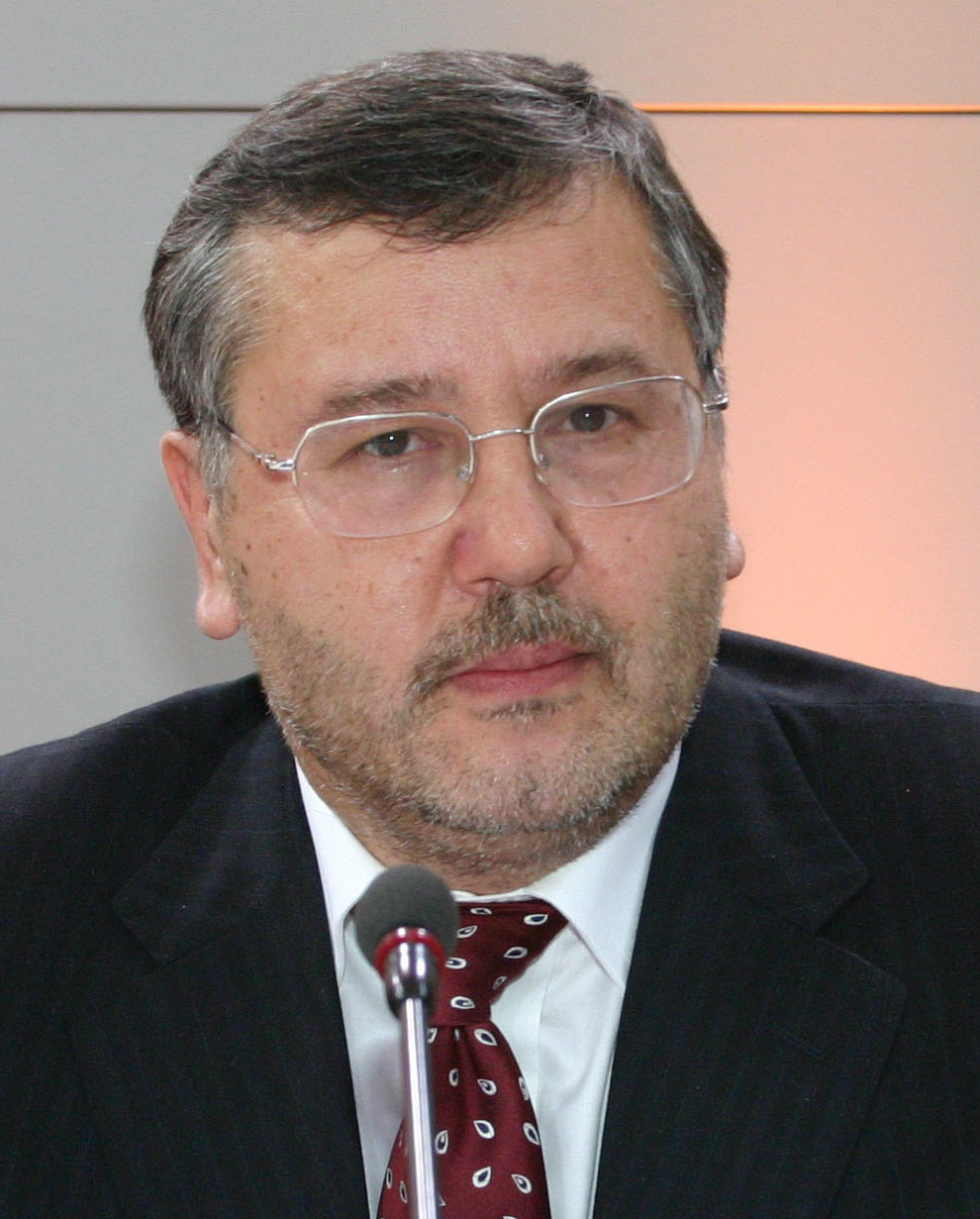
- Hrytsenko in 2006

Minister of Defence of Ukraine
- In office 4 February 2005 – 18 December 2007
- Prime Minister: Yulia Tymoshenko; Yuriy Yekhanurov; Viktor Yanukovych
- Preceded by: Oleksandr Kuzmuk
- Succeeded by: Yuriy Yekhanurov

People's Deputy of Ukraine
- In office 15 December 2007 – 27 November 2014

Personal details
- Born: 25 October 1957 (age 68) Bahachivka, Cherkasy Oblast, Ukrainian SSR, Soviet Union (now Ukraine)
- Party: Civil Position
- Spouses: Liudmyla Mykhailivna (m. 1978; div. 2002) Yuliia Volodymyrivna Mostova (m. 2003)
- Children: with Liudmyla Hrytsenko: –Oleksii (b. 1979); –Svitlana (b. 1982); with Yulia Mostova: –Hanna (b. 2004); –Hlib Razumkov (b. 1998, stepson)

Anatoliy Stepanovych Hrytsenko (Ukrainian: Анатолій Степанович Гриценко; born 25 October 1957) is a Ukrainian politician, independent (Note: In the Ukrainian context, an MP is considered independent if he/she does not belong to any faction represented in the parliament, hence, not necessarily non-partisan. The Ukrainian term is позафракційний which literally means out of a faction.) deputy of the 7th Ukrainian Verkhovna Rada, former Minister of Defence, and member of the Our Ukraine political party and leader of the Civil Position party.

== Education ==
Hrytsenko graduated from Kyiv Higher Military Aviation Engineering School on 23 June 1979. On 10 December 1984 he was awarded a Candidate of Sciences (Ph.D.) degree from Kyiv Higher Military Aviation Engineering School. In 1993 Hrytsenko graduated from the Defense Language Institute of the United States Department of Defense. On 6 June 1994 he graduated from the Resident Program of the U.S. Air War College and on 30 October 1995 Hrytsenko graduated from the Academy of the Armed Forces of Ukraine.

Hrytsenko is author of more than 100 scientific papers published in Ukraine, Belgium, the Netherlands, United States, Germany and Switzerland.

== Army career ==
Hrytsenko served 25 years in the Armed Forces of Ukraine, in combat units, as teacher at the military college and in staff positions in the Ministry of Defense of Ukraine. He retired with the rank of colonel. From December 1999 till 2004 he worked as a military consultant in various firms. In February 2000 Hrytsenko served as Freelance Consultant on the Committee on National Security and Defence of the Verkhovna Rada and in November 2000 as a member of the Public Council of Experts on domestic issues of the President of Ukraine.

== Political career ==
In 2004 Hrytsenko worked in the election headquarters (for the 2004 Ukrainian presidential election) of Viktor Yushchenko and took an active part in the writing his election program.

=== Minister of Defence ===
Hrytsenko became Minister of Defence in the First Tymoshenko Government in February 2005, he continued this position in the Yekhanurov Government. On 4 August 2006, he was appointed again as head of the Ministry of Defence in the government of Viktor Yanukovych on the quota of President Yushchenko.

As Minister of Defense, Hrytsenko took up the issues of financing and reforming the Armed Forces. In 2005, for the first time in recent years, the army was fully funded. In 2006, its budget grew by 51% and reached ₴8.9 billion. Compared to 2004, in 2005 combat training indicators increased by an average of 40-50%.

In 2007, when Hrytsenko was the Minister of Defense, a military hospital in Dnipropetrovsk was sold to a private company. After that, the former military facility was given to the Russian VTB Bank, which later received direct control over this hospital. Petro Poroshenko's commissioner for the peaceful settlement of the conflict in Donetsk and Lugansk Oblasts stated that "Today, in fact, the hospital where our guys are being treated belongs to the invader country." In October 2014, this information was confirmed by Valeriy Heletey who served as Minister of Defense at the time.

Hrytsenko resigned from his post as minister following a conflict with president Viktor Yushchenko, whom he accused of viewing the army property as "superfluous".

=== People's Deputy ===
In the early 2007 parliamentary elections he was elected into the Verkhovna Rada (Ukraine's parliament) as number 4 on the party list of the pro-president Yushchenko Our Ukraine–People's Self-Defense Bloc. Although this bloc was part of the Second Tymoshenko Government Yuriy Yekhanurov became Minister of Defense in this cabinet.

In January 2010 Hrytsenko became party leader of Civil Position. Hrytsenko was a candidate for President of Ukraine in the 2010 Ukrainian presidential elections, and in the election he received 1.2% of the votes (finishing ninth). In the second round he called on voting against both candidates (Yulia Tymoshenko and Viktor Yanukovych). Civil Position gained one seat in the Ternopil city council during the 2010 Ukrainian local elections.

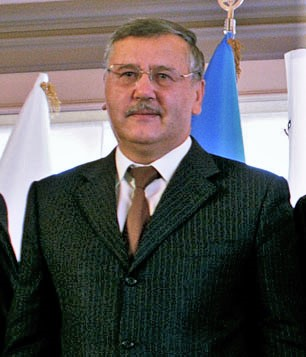
Hrytsenko in 2012

During the 2012 Ukrainian parliamentary election Hrytsenko was elected into the Verkhovna Rada as 3rd on the electoral list of Batkivshchyna., but he later resigned from Rada because of disagreements with the faction.

=== Post-2014 Activity ===
Hrytsenko was one of the candidates for presidency in the 2014 Ukrainian presidential election. According to the opinion poll ordered by 1+1 TV channel and conducted by GfK Ukraine on 6–8 May, 5.6 per cent of the surveyed planned to vote for him. In the election he received 5.48% of the vote, ranking him in 4th place.

In the 2014 parliamentary election Civil Position took part on a joint list with members of the Democratic Alliance. For elections in single member constituencies, both parties participated separately. In the election the alliance failed to clear the 5% election threshold (it got 3.1% of the votes) and also both parties did not win a constituency seat and thus no parliamentary seats.

On 4 April 2018, National Anti-Corruption Bureau of Ukraine (NABU) informed that the Specialized Anti-Corruption Prosecutor Office initiated a criminal proceeding based on results of state financial audit of "Viysktorhservis" consortium. Representatives of public organizations called on the Prosecutor General to check these facts.

Hrytsenko's Civil Position nominated Hrytsenko as a candidate in the 2019 Ukrainian presidential election on 11 January 2019. Hrytsenko's candidacy was supported by the European Party of Ukraine, Native Land, Alternative, and Wave. On 1 March (2019) fellow candidates Andriy Sadovyi and Dmytro Gnap withdrew from the election and urged (their) voters to support Hrytsenko. On 7 March Dmytro Dobrodomov stepped out of the election also in favor of Hrytsenko. During the 2019 presidential election campaign Hrytsenko proposed to create a Ukrainian military reserve force and to legalize firearms (including registration of all firearms). In the election Hrytsenko did not proceed to the second round of the election; in the first round he placed fifth with 6.91% of the votes.

In the 2019 Ukrainian parliamentary election Civil Position gained 1.04% of the national vote and no parliamentary seats.

== Awards ==
- Honorary weapon – Fort-12 pistol (25 October 2007)

== Earnings ==
According to the declaration, in 2016, Hrytsenko earned ₴150,000. He has four apartments in Kyiv (with an area of 56.2 m^{2}, 80.2 m^{2}, 32.9 m^{2} and 110.3 m^{2}), a car Volvo XC90, as well as €106,000 in bank accounts.

== Personal life ==
- From 1978 to 2002, he was married to Lyudmila. The couple had two children.
  - Oleksii (born 1979) graduated from the Kyiv Polytechnic Institute, he was a forward and then vice president of the Berkut Hockey Club, director of business development at the Enran Telecom research and production company, and first deputy head of the Youth Union of Our Ukraine party. In 2006, Enran Telecom (in which Oleksii Hrytsenko was working at the moment) became one of the co-executives of the project to create a unified automated system for managing of administrative and business processes in the Armed Forces of Ukraine. About ₴100 million was allocated for the implementation of the project.
  - The eldest daughter Svetlana (born 1982) graduated from school with a gold medal, received a bachelor's degree in international economics from the Kyiv National Economic University and a master's degree in international business from University of Stirling in Scotland. Svetlana worked as an expert at the Ukrainian Centre for Economic and Political Studies (UCEPS) and in the election headquarters of Viktor Yushchenko, then became the press secretary of the Berkut Hockey Club and the project manager for the Kyiv office of The PBN Company.
- Anatoliy Hrytsenko is married to Yulia Mostova, a chief editor of well known Ukrainian newspaper Dzerkalo Tyzhnia and a widow of Oleksandr Razumkov. Hrytsenko and Mostova had to celebrate the wedding seven times, most recently in June 2003, together with the then-future Ukrainian President Viktor Yushchenko and his wife Kateryna Chumachenko. On 6 March 2016, the couple married in the church.
  - Hrytsenko and Mostova have a daughter Anna (born 2004), also Mostova have a son Hlib (born 1999) - the youngest son of Razumkov.

== Notes ==
Political offices
Preceded by Oleksandr Kuzmuk	Minister of Defense; 2005–2007	Succeeded by Yuriy Yekhanurov
