= European Party of Ukraine =

European Party of Ukraine Європейська партія України
- Abbreviation: YePU
- Leader: Viktor Vasuliuk
- Founder: Mykola Katerynchuk
- Founded: 3 August 2006; 20 years ago
- Headquarters: Kyiv
- Ideology: Social liberalism Liberalism; Pro-Europeanism
- Political position: Centre
- European affiliation: Alliance of Liberals and Democrats for Europe Party
- Colours: Blue
- Verkhovna Rada: 0 / 450
- Regions: 39 / 43,122

Party flag

Website
- http://www.epu.in.ua/

The European Party of Ukraine (Ukrainian: Європейська партія України, romanized: Yevropeiska partiia Ukrainy) is a Ukrainian political party registered by the Ministry of Justice on 3 August 2006. Its ideology is social liberalism.

== History ==
=== Foundation ===
The date of registration of the European Party of Ukraine by the Ministry of Justice is 3 August 2006. The first party leader was Mykola Moskalenko, and Victor Zavalnyy was his deputy. Since September 2007, Mykola Katerynchuk has been the leader of the party.

=== 2007 parliamentary election ===
The European Party joined the single bloc of national democratic parties, Our Ukraine–People's Self-Defense Bloc, for the snap 2007 parliamentary election. Mykola Katerynchuk was included as the number 5 in the bloc's list for the election. He was elected to the Verkhovna Rada, after the bloc received 14,15% and 72 seats total in the snap election.

=== 2008 parliamentary election ===
During the 2008 Kyiv local election the party was part of Mykola Katerynchuk Bloc that won 3.47% of the votes and 5 seats in the Kyiv City Council. Mykola Katerynchuk ran for the position Mayor of Kyiv, finishing 5th overall with 4,44% of the vote.

=== 2010 presidential and local elections ===
During the 2010 presidential election, the European Party of Ukraine has endorsed Yulia Tymoshenko.

During the 2010 Ukrainian local elections, the party has won no seats in any Oblast Council. Its biggest success was winning a single seat on the Lutsk City Council. According to the results, the European Party of Ukraine has won a total of 150 seats in lower level councils.

=== 2012 parliamentary election ===
In October 2008, the party intended to run in the 2012 parliamentary election as part of any electoral coalition, and was holding negotiations with the Lytvyn Bloc, the Yulia Tymoshenko Bloc, Vitali Klitschko (in case he would participate in the elections independently) and other political forces. In August 2011, the party announced it would merge with the Civil Position. However, later, the Civil Position would run on list of the Batkivshchyna, together with several other parties, during the 2012 parliamentary elections. In these elections, YePU party leader, Mykola Katerynchuk, was re-elected in a 13th electoral district in Vinnytsia Oblast as a Batkivshchyna candidate. In the same election, the party was running candidates in 5 constituencies under its own name (Vinnytsia Oblast, Volyn Oblast, Donetsk Oblast, Ivano-Frankivsk Oblast, Poltava Oblast and Sumy Oblast; the party did not participate in the elections in the national multi-mandate electoral district), but it won in none and thus missed parliamentary representation. When several parties, that had competed under the Batkivshchyna umbrella in 2012, merged into the latter in June 2013, YePU decided to remain as a separate party.

=== 2014 parliamentary election ===
The party did not participate in the 2014 Ukrainian parliamentary election. Katerynchuk was running for re-election in the 13th electoral district as a candidate of the Petro Poroshenko Bloc, but has lost to an independent candidate, Petro Yurchyshyn, who received 44,79% of the vote, compared to the 41.29% won by Katerynchuk.

=== 2019 presidential and parliamentary election ===
The party has supported the candidacy of Anatoliy Hrytsenko for the 2019 presidential election. Katerynchuk became Hrytsenko's legal advisor in the latter's election headquarters in December 2018. In that election, Hrytsenko did not proceed to the second round, placing fifth with 6,91% of the votes.

The party did not take part in the parliamentary election being held the same year. Mykola Katerynchuk, however, became a candidate in the list of the Civil Position, being placed in the top five. Civil Position would receive just 1.04% of the vote and no parliamentary representation.

== Party structure ==
=== Leader ===
Party leader is Mykola Katerynchuk, the people's deputy of Ukraine (2002–2014). In 2004, he defended the interests of presidential candidate, Viktor Yushchenko, at the Supreme Court of Ukraine.

=== Governing bodies ===
- Party congress (convenes no less than once every two years; defines the party strategy and chooses its leader).
- Party council (held every one or two months).
- Party central executive committee (provides organizational, informational, analytical and resource support of the party; provides practical implementation of the party central executive bodies’ decisions, orders and instructions of its leader).
- Party conferences and executive committees at the primary level of the local party organizations.

== Ideology ==
The party adheres to the basic principles of social liberalism, according to that the state should intervene into economic processes to fight monopoly and maintain a competitive market environment. The society should have legitimate reasons if the income does not meet the contribution of a person to the common good, to withdraw some of this income through taxes and redistribute it for social needs. Improving the living conditions of the poorest strata of society will contribute to the growth of the internal market and economic growth.

=== Goals and priorities of the Party ===
- Integration of Ukraine into Europe as a single territory without internal borders and barriers with free flow of work force and financial resources.
- Approximation of Ukraine's living standards to European ones by implementing systemic reforms.
- Support of the course of the European Union as an institution founded on fundamental liberal principles of freedom, democracy and rule of law.
- Environmental protection and use of alternative sources of energy.
- Conducting educational campaigns and legislative initiatives aimed at preventing gender discrimination.
- Organization of educational events for young people to make them aware of the history of creation and the basics of activity of the EU institutions, ideas of the leading liberal ideologues and thinkers, as well as the peculiarities of the European integration of Ukraine.

=== European vector of activity ===
- Support to signing of the Association Agreement between Ukraine and the EU.
- Simplification of the visa regime for citizens of Ukraine with the EU.
- Promotion of European integration of Ukraine.
- Adaptation of European experience in different areas of social and political life in Ukraine.
