= Vasyl Burba =

Ukrainian former army officer

- Василь Бурба
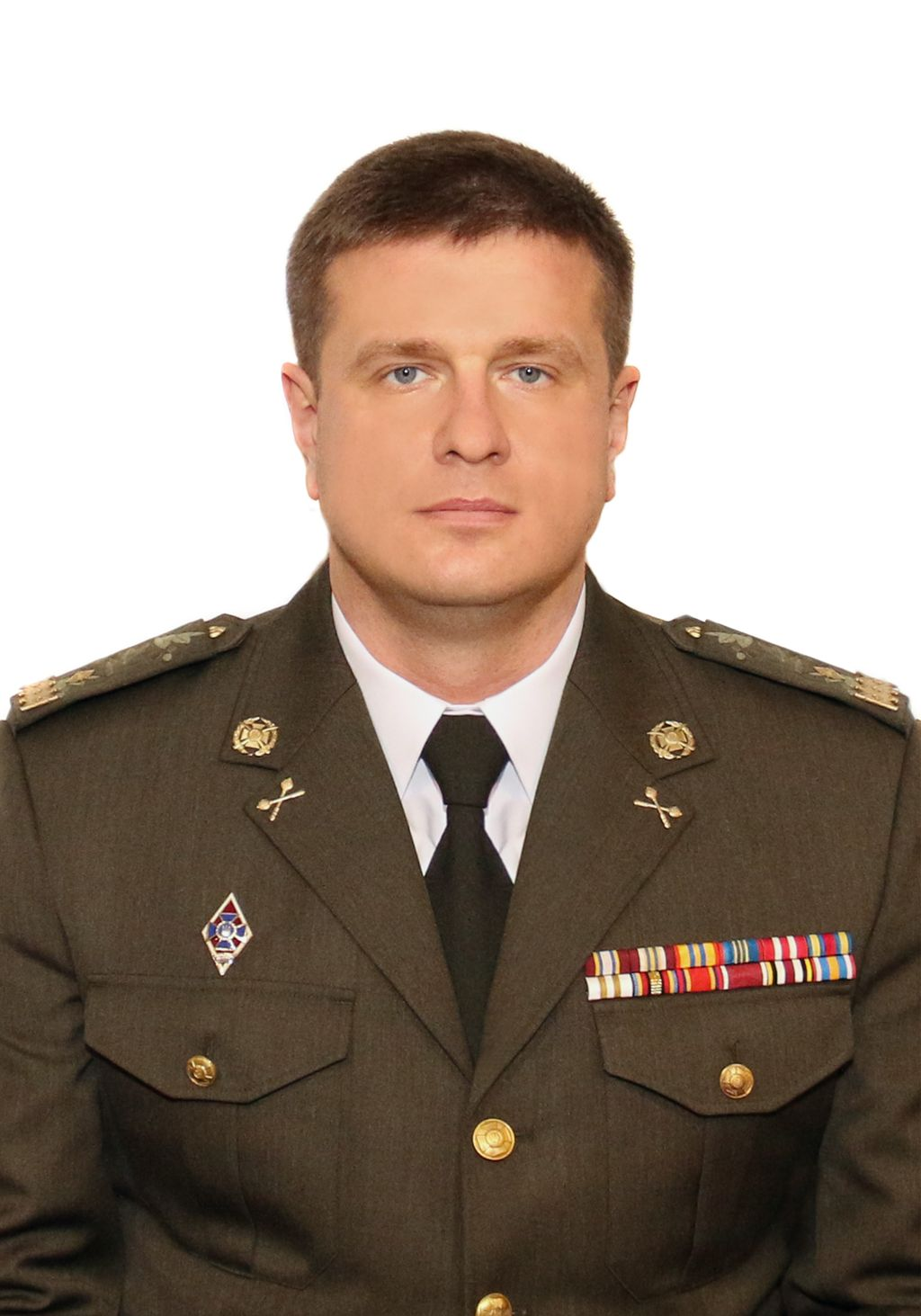
- Official portrait, 2016

Chief of the Main Directorate of Intelligence of Ukraine
- In office 15 October 2016 – 5 August 2020
- Preceded by: Valeriy Kondratyuk
- Succeeded by: Kyrylo Budanov

Personal details
- Born: 4 June 1978 (age 48) Rivne, Ukrainian SSR, Soviet Union
- Party: Independent

Military service
- Allegiance: Ukraine
- Branch/service: Armed Forces of Ukraine
- Years of service: 2011–2021
- Rank: Colonel General
- Commands: Main Directorate of Intelligence

Vasyl Vasylovych Burba (Ukrainian: Василь Васильович Бурба; born 4 June 1978) is a Ukrainian former army officer who was the Chief of the Main Directorate of Intelligence of Ukraine from 2016 to 2020.

He is a doctor of Law, and professor of the National Academy of the Security Service of Ukraine.

He was last ranked a colonel general as of 2018.

== Biography ==
Burba was born in Rivne on 4 June 1978.

He graduated from the SBU National Academy as a lawyer.

In 2011, in the rank of major, he was awarded the Order of Bohdan Khmelnytsky III class. He worked in the SBU. In 2016, he was awarded the Order of Bohdan Khmelnytsky II class.

=== Activities during the Euromaidan ===
During the Euromaidan, Burba worked as the head of the 2nd department "K" of the State Security Service of Ukraine, coordinated work with law enforcement agencies, the prosecutor's office, the Ministry of Defense, the Ministry of Emergency Situations, and the judicial branch of government.

According to the information of some Ukrainian mass media, he was involved in sources of funding for Anti-Maidan.

On February 24, 2014, Hennadiy Moskal made public photocopies of part of the plans for special operations to clean up the Euromaidan "Boomerang" and "Hvylia", in which it is indicated that Burba was responsible for blocking the roads at the entrances to Kyiv and for round-the-clock provision of the necessary number of emergency services with the involvement of engineering equipment.

Also on 26 November 2021, during a press conference, the President Volodymyr Zelenskyy repeated the information known from published documents that Burba "managed the blocking of traffic on the Maidan when the Maidan was accelerating.

Later, the former head of the Office of the President of Ukraine Andriy Bohdan denied Zelenskyy's regarding Burba's participation in blocking traffic on the Maidan.

Later, Burba himself stated that the law enforcement officers repeatedly checked his actions during the Euromaidan and no charges were brought against him.

=== Russo-Ukrainian War ===
According to "Information Resistance", in February 2014 he was appointed acting head of the Counterintelligence Department of the SBU, and in March he was sworn into office.

At Valery Kondratyuk's call, he joined the combat unit formed by the Counterintelligence Department. According to "Information Resistance", on 12 March 2014, this unit detained the personnel officer of the GRU of the General Staff of the ZSRF Roman Filatov (born 18 August 1981) in the area where military units of the Armed Forces of Ukraine are deployed in the Kherson region. Filatov had a Ukrainian passport in the name of Yevhen Arbuzov from Crimea. Along with Filatov's capture, the agency and intelligence group was also liquidated.

Filatov was later exchanged for Ukrainian activists and servicemen from Crimea, who were held by the Russian occupation forces. Yuliy Mamchur and Serhiy Hayduk were among those released. According to the "Information Resistance", as a result of this operation and the effective work of counterintelligence, the leadership of the Russia was forced to abandon the mass use of intelligence groups on Ukrainian territory.

During the war in the east of Ukraine, from May 2014 he participated in the anti-terrorist operation in the east of Ukraine, was a curator from the Main Intelligence Directorate of the Ministry of Defense of Ukraine. He coordinated the work of all counter-intelligence operational groups of the SBU in the ATO area.

Together with Kondratyuk, in 2015 he transferred to the Main Directorate of Intelligence of the Ministry of Defense of Ukraine, later he was appointed deputy head of the Ministry of Defense of Ukraine. For the successful conduct of a number of intelligence operations in April 2016, he was awarded the Order of Bohdan Khmelnytsky II degree, and in August he was promoted to major general.

On 15 October 2016, at the age of 38, Burba was appointed the head of the Main Directorate of Intelligence., replacing Kondratyuk in this position.

In 2019, he was included in the Interdepartmental Commission on the policy of military-technical cooperation and export control.

On 5 August 2020, Burba was dismissed from the position of the head of the GUR, and was replaced by his successor, Kyrylo Budanov.

The media associate the resignation with the so-called "Wagner case," which concerns the alleged disruption of the operation to detain members of the Wagner Group.

After his resignation, he worked as a professor at the National Academy of the Security Service of Ukraine. Since 2020, he has been engaged in advocacy, a member of the Kyiv Bar Council.

In December 2021, Burba resigned from the army.
