= Civil Position =

Civil Position/Civic Position Громадянська позиція
- Leader: Anatoliy Hrytsenko
- Founded: March 2005
- Ideology: Conservatism; Economic liberalism Centrism; Pro-Europeanism
- Political position: Centre
- European affiliation: Alliance of Liberals and Democrats for Europe
- Colours: Yellow and Blue
- Verkhovna Rada: 0 / 450
- Regions: 135 / 43,122

Party flag

Website
- gp.org.ua

Civil Position or Civic Position (Ukrainian: Громадянська позиція, romanized: Hromadianska pozytsiia) is a political party in Ukraine registered in March 2005. It is led by former Minister of Defence Anatoliy Hrytsenko.

== History ==
=== Mighty Ukraine ===
The party was registered in March 2005 under the name Mighty Ukraine (Ukrainian: Могутня Україна) and it was known as this until 2010. At this time the party did not participate in any parliamentary elections. The original party leader was Oleksandr Chubatenko. Chubatenko ran the election headquarters of Anatoliy Hrytsenko during the 2010 Ukrainian presidential election.

=== Civil Position ===
In February 2010, the party was renamed Civil Position, and at the same time Hrytsenko became party leader. The decision to rename the party and change its chairman was approved by a party Congress on 21 January 2010.

At the 2010 local elections, the party's results were infinitesimal. Civil Position gained one seat on the Ternopil city council.

In August 2011, the party announced it would merge with the European Party of Ukraine. Later, in December 2011 the Ukrainian Democratic Alliance for Reform and Civil Position announced they were negotiating a merger. However, in June 2012, the party announced it would compete on a single party list with other opposition parties during the 2012 parliamentary election.

In a December 2011 poll by Rating, the party scored 2.3%, then 2.4% in May 2012.

The party competed on an "umbrella" party list with Fatherland, along with several other opposition parties, for the 2012 parliamentary election. This list won 101 seats with 25.55% of the party vote. The breakdown was 62 seats from the party list and 39 seats from single-member constituencies. The party itself had competed in 1 constituency where it lost. Hrytsenko was placed 3rd on the joint list and was elected. When several of the other parties that had competed under the joint list merged into Fatherland in June 2013 the party did not join them and kept its independence. Hrytsenko left the Fatherland faction on 14 January 2014. On 17 January 2014 he submitted a letter of resignation to parliament.

Hrytsenko was a candidate for the party at the 2014 presidential election where he placed 4th in the first and only round. Previously, Hrytsenko was an independent candidate at the 2010 presidential election.

On 7 September 2014, party congress decided that the party would participate in the 2014 parliamentary election on a joint list with members of the Democratic Alliance. For elections in single member constituencies, both parties participated separately. In the election, the party failed to clear the 5% election threshold (it got 3.1% of the votes) and also did not win a constituency seat and thus no parliamentary seats.

Concerning the ongoing War in Donbas, the party advocates an end to the conflict by use of force.

The party was accepted into the Alliance of Liberals and Democrats for Europe (ALDE) on 4 June 2016.

The party nominated party leader Hrytsenko as a candidate in the 2019 Ukrainian presidential election on 11 January 2019. He placed fifth with 6.91% of the votes in the first round and thus did not proceed to the second round of the election.

In the 2019 Ukrainian parliamentary election, the party gained 1.04% of the national vote and no parliamentary seats, the party also failed to win a constituency seat.

In the 2020 Ukrainian local elections, the party gained 141 deputies (0.32% of all available mandates).

== Election results ==
=== Verkhovna Rada ===
Election	Popular vote	% of popular vote	Overall seats won	Seat change	Government
2012	352	0.00	0 / 450	0	Extra-parliamentary
2014	489,523	3.11	0 / 450	0	Extra-parliamentary
2019	153,225	1.05	0 / 450	0	Extra-parliamentary

=== Presidential elections ===
President of Ukraine
Election year	Candidate	# of 1st round votes	% of 1st round vote	# of 2nd round votes	% of 2nd round vote	Won/Loss
2014	Anatoliy Hrytsenko	989,029	5.48			Loss
2019	Anatoliy Hrytsenko	1,306,450	6.91			Loss
