= Kyiv Military Aviation Engineering Academy =

- Russian: Киевское Высшее Военное Авиационное Инженерное Училище (КВВАИУ)
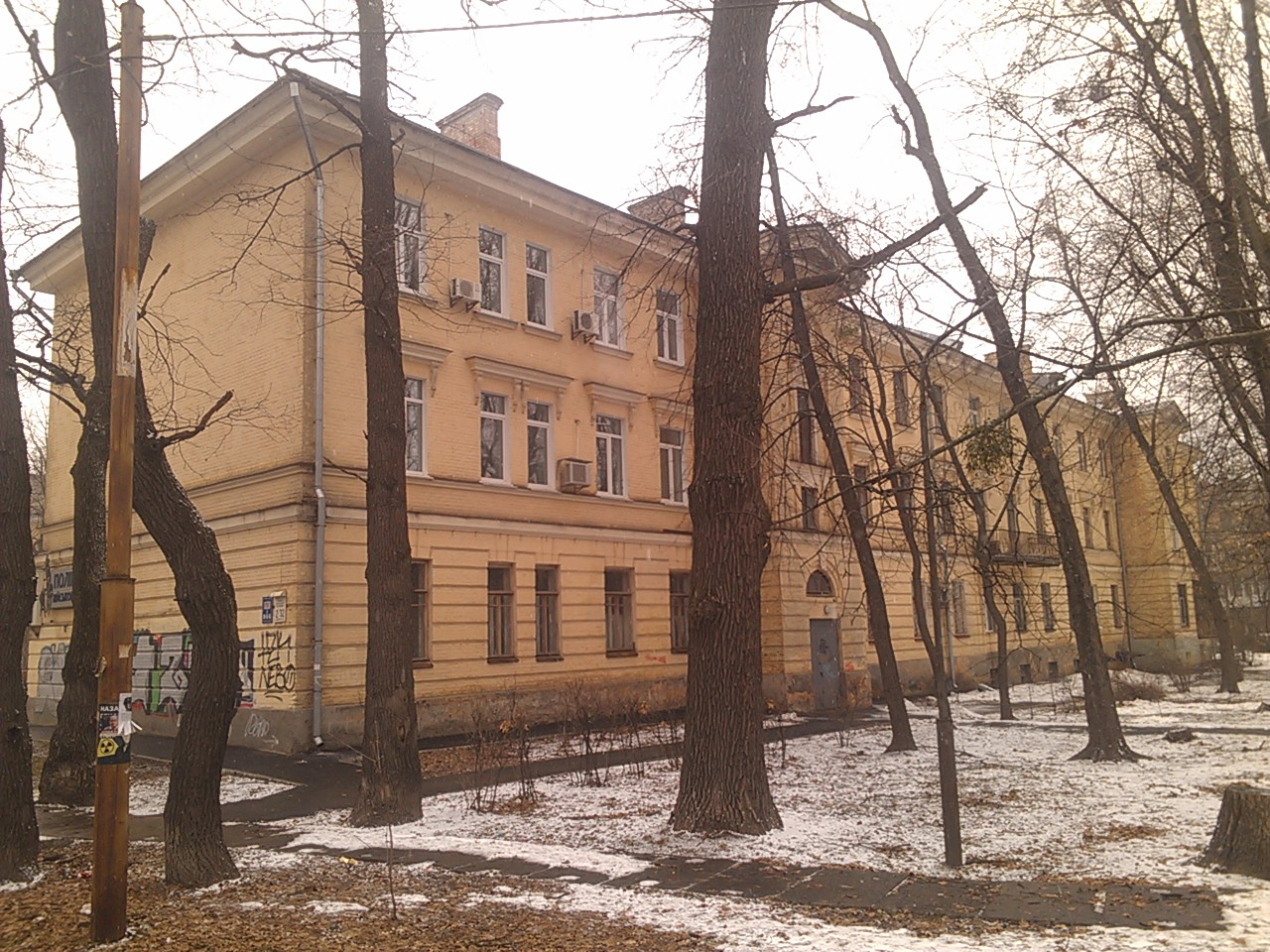
- Type: Military Academy for Aviation
- Established: 1951
- Students: Engineering personnel for the Air Force.
- Location: Kyiv, 1951–1991 Ukrainian Soviet Socialist Republic, USSR. After 1991, Ukraine.

Kyiv Military Aviation Engineering Academy (Ukrainian: Київське вище військове авіаційне інженерне училище, КВВАІУ) in Kyiv, Ukraine was one of the leading military university-level institutions and research centers of the Soviet Union for the preparation of highly qualified engineers of various specialties for the Soviet Air Forces and Soviet Air Defence Forces. After the breakdown of the Soviet Union, it became the main (and only) military school in Ukraine, preparing engineering and logistics officers for the Ukrainian Air Force.

All educational programs had five-year duration and graduates were granted a qualification and a degree of military engineer (corresponding to the western level from Bachelor to Master of Engineering). The same educational programs were used at the Zhukovsky Air Force Engineering Academy.

== History ==
It was founded on September 1, 1951 as the Kyiv Higher Engineering Radio-Technical College of the Soviet Air Force.

The academy had a very high reputation; competition for admission was 15 applicants per place. It had academic councils which were awarding Doktor nauk and Candidate of Sciences (Ph.D.) degrees.

The academy had two locations. The main academic campus was located at 30 Vozdukhoflotskii Avenue in a massive three-story building built in the 1910s, and a second building on Hryhoriia Andriuschenka Street. In addition, the academy had a training airfield near the Kyiv International Airport (Zhuliany). About a dozen planes and helicopters of various types were available there for engineering practice. The flights were not performed. Later, the training airfield was used to establish the Ukraine State Aviation Museum.

On July 3, 2000, the military institution has ceased to exist as such, has been reorganized, the staff and students were relocated to the Air Force University at Kharkiv. The main academic building now houses the Ivan Chernyakhovsky National Defense University of Ukraine.

== Faculties ==
- 1 - Aircraft and Engines
- 2 - Aviation Weapons
- 3 - Aviation Equipment (electrical, hydraulic, etc.)
- 4 - Avionics
- 5 - Foreign military specialists (primarily from African countries)
- 6 - Studies by correspondence

The faculties #1 and #2 admitted officers who previously completed training at the three-year technical military colleges and had experience of service in the Air Force. The faculties of Aviation Equipment and Avionics accepted high school graduates.

== Commanders ==
- Ivanov, AF (IV.1951 - II.1954) Иванов А. Ф.
- Bondarenko II (II.1954-VIII.1962) Бондаренко И. И.
- Maksimov, NA (VI.1962-X.1975) Максимов Н. А.
- Saints KF (X.1975-IV.1976) Угодников К. Ф.
- Chelyshev KB (V.1976 - VII.1990) Челышев К. Б.
- Gulyaev, VV (from VII.1990) Гуляев В. В.

== Notable Faculty and Personnel ==
- Alexander Balenko
- Pyotr Chinayev
- Grigory Golikov
- Anatoly Gritsenko
- Feodosy Iotka
- Georgy Kats
- Alexander Karpov
- Alexander Kucherenko
- Emelyan Kondrat
- Alexander Kornev
- Ivan Korovin
- Mark Lanovenko
- Igor Migulin
- Anatoly Nedbaylo
- Vladimir Polupanov
- Viktor Soshnikov
- Vasily Yakovlev

== Sample Monographs Published by Faculty ==
- Dudko, G., Reznikov, GB Doppler velocity meters, and drift angle plane. M. The Soviet radio., 1964. -344 pp. (Дудко Г.К., Резников Г.Б. Допплеровские измерители скорости и угла сноса самолета. М. Советское радио. -1964г. -344 с.)
- Reznikov, GB Aircraft antenna. "Soviet Radio", Moscow, 1962. - 456 pp. (Резников Г. Б. Самолетные антенны. «Советское радио», Москва, 1962. - 456 с.)
- Chinayev P. Self-tuning systems: calculation and design. - Moscow: Mashgiz. - 1963. - 303 pp. (Чинаев П.И. Самонастраивающиеся системы: расчет и проектирование. - Москва: Машгиз. - 1963. - 303 с.)
- Yakovlev VN Microelectronic pulse generators. - Kyiv: Tehnika, 1982. - 208 pp. (Яковлев В. Н. Микроэлектронные генераторы импульсов . - Киев : Технiка, 1982. - 208 с.)

== References and external links ==
- Alumni Social Website
- 25th Anniversary of the 1976 Graduation К 25-летию выпуска ФАРЭО КВВАИУ 1976 года
