= 2009 Ternopil Oblast local election =

Local election in Ukraine

- 15 March 2009

All 120 seats to the Ternopil Oblast Council
	First party	Second party	Third party
Leader	Oleh Tyahnybok	United Centre	Viktor Yanukovych
Party	Svoboda	United Centre	Party of Regions
Leader since	14 February 2004	27 March 2008	19 April 2003
Last election	0 seats, 2.69%	N/A	0 seats, 1.60%
Seats won	50	20	14
Seat change	+50	+20	+14
Popular vote	154,325	63,207	43,616
Percentage	34.69%	14.20%	9.80%
Swing	+32.00%	+14.20%	+8.20%
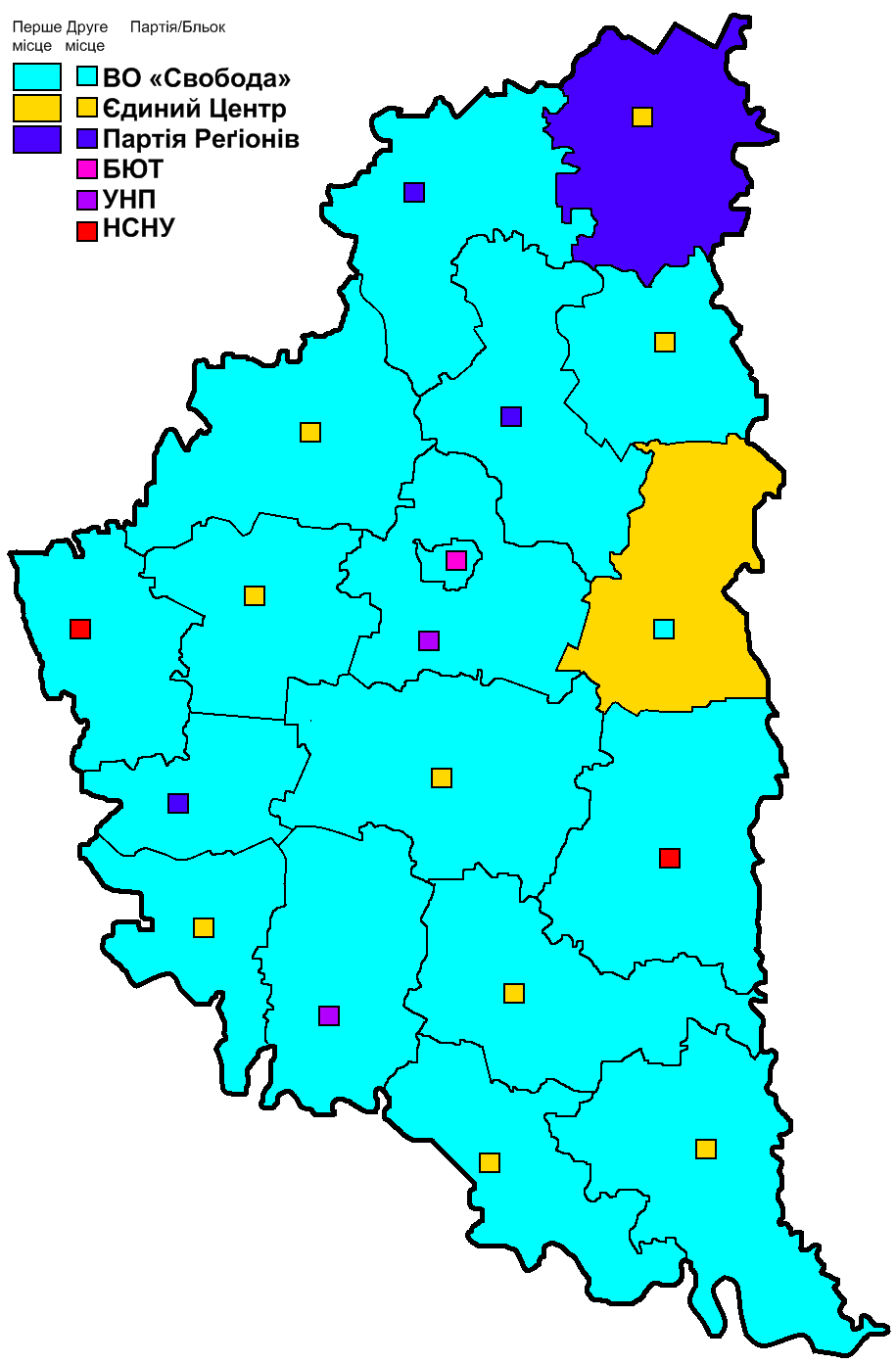
- Results of the 2009 Ternopil Oblast local election.
Head of Council before election
Mykhailo Mykolayenko
Tymoshenko Bloc
Elected Head of Council
Oleksiy Kaida
Svoboda

The Ternopil Oblast local election, 2009 elections in the Ternopil Oblast regional council, were held on March 15, 2009.

== Background ==
The vote was initially appointed on December 18, 2008 by a decision of Ukrainian Parliament initiated by the Bloc Yulia Tymoshenko (BYuT), but cancelled on 3 March 2009 by the same Parliament, with most members of BYuT voting against holding the snap elections, allegedly because of the fall of the party's ratings. Following a lawsuit filed by the Svoboda the Ternopil oblast` court acknowledged this decision to be illegal on March 11, 2009. The next day BYuT lodged an appeal in the Lviv Administrative Appeal Court against this decision.

On 13 March 2009, President Viktor Yushchenko asked the Constitutional Court to estimate the constitutionality of the Ukrainian Parliament’s decision to cancel the early regional council elections in Ternopil. According to Yushchenko the Constitution reads that Parliament can appoint elections or early elections into the local authorities, but cannot cancel them.

== Election ==
The elections were held on 15 March 2009. The Bloc Yulia Tymoshenko called the election "the presentation of cynical electoral fraud by Head of the Presidential Secretariat Viktor Baloha against expression of the will of the region's citizens".

Some villages reported cases Party of Regions representatives offering ₴50 per vote.

== Challenging the results ==
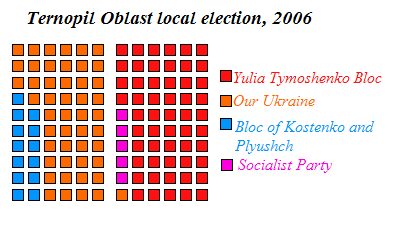

On March 24, the Ternopil district administrative court rejected a lawsuit from the Bloc of Yulia Tymoshenko (BYuT) challenging the results of the elections. Four days later the Kyiv district administrative court banned the official publication of the result of the elections.

On April 7 the Lviv administrative court of appeals ruled to cancel a decision of the Ternopil district administrative court denying consideration of a lawsuit from BYuT against the results of the elections to the Ternopil regional council. The Lviv administrative court of appeals instructed the Ternopil district administrative court to consider the essence of the lawsuit.

On May 11, 2009 BYuT members gave up their twelve seats in Ternopil regional council. As a result, the number of deputies in the regional Ternopil council became 208. The overall number of mandates in the council still constitutes 120, and all the decisions taken by the majority of the council still has to be passed by no less than 61 votes.

On June 16, 2009 the Constitutional Court of Ukraine deemed the parliamentary resolution on canceling early election to Ternopil Regional Council (of March 3, 2009) unconstitutional. This case was initiated by President Viktor Yuschenko.

== Results ==
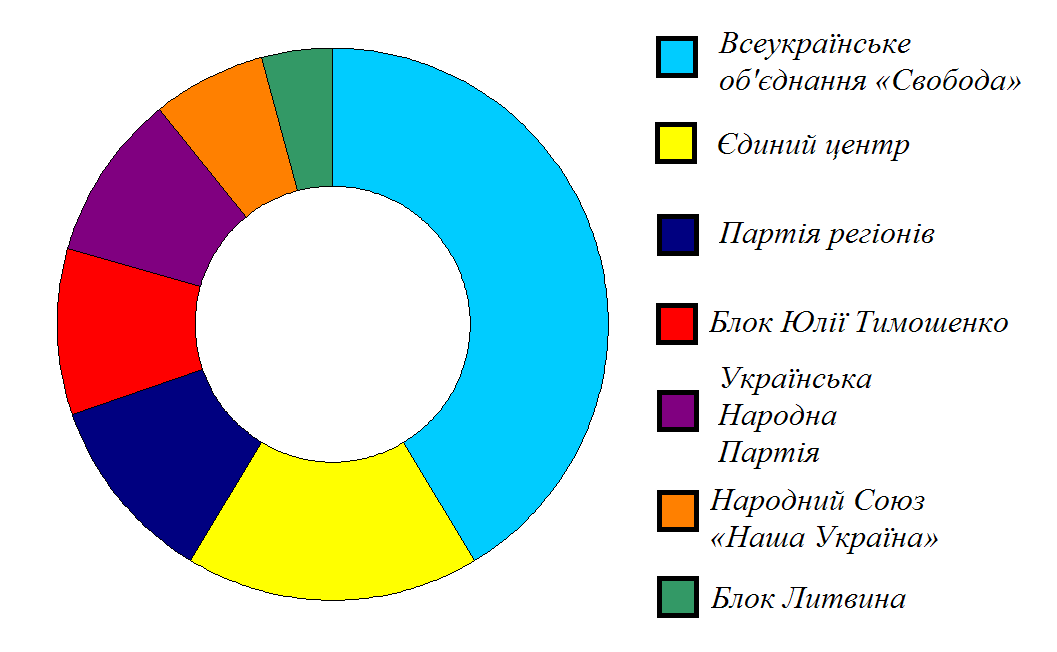
Results

The election have been conducted after the proportional electoral system. In an order to conduct the representatives in the Ternopil regional council, party or block must collect not less than 3% voices of electors.

According to political annalist the scores of United Centre and Party of Regions could be caused by mass fraud. Experts were less surprised by the high score of All-Ukrainian Union "Freedom" because (according to the think tank "Open Policy") support for rightist parties like "Freedom" typically builds up in conditions of economic and political crisis and "Freedom" has roots in the region. The turnout in Ternopil (city) was only 25%.

№	Party	Votes	Votes %
1	All-Ukrainian Union "Freedom"	153 038	34,45
2	United Centre	63 143	14,32
3	Party of Regions	43,432	9,78
4	Yulia Tymoshenko Bloc	36 056	8,12
5	Ukrainian People's Party	35 647	8,03
6	People's Union "Our Ukraine"	24 439	5,50
7	Lytvyn Bloc	15 908	3,58
8	Socialist Party of Ukraine	9 252	2,08
9	PORA	6 230	1,40
10	Congress of Ukrainian Nationalists	5 380	1,21
11	Civil Movement "People's Self-Defense"	2 895	0,65
12	Communist Party of Ukraine	2 291	0,52
13	Great Ukraine	1 726	0,47
14	Agrarian Party	1 501	0,43
15	New Politics	1 168	0,33
16	New Democracy	1 126	0,32
	Against all		6,16
	Invalid bulletins		3,13
	Total turnout 52.02%		

== Polls ==
Party:	Results last election	Sociological group "Rating" (January 27, 2009)	Den (February 7, 2009)
BYuT	34.23%	28,7%	20%
PR	<3%*	2,4%	np**
OU-PSD	31.27%	15%*** (PU-"OU")	2% - 3%
CPU	<3%	np	np
LB	<3%	5,6%	np
SPU	3.3%	0,7%	np
Svoboda	<3%	16,1%	12% - 15%
UNB Kostenko and Plyushch†	8.65%	1.6† (UPP)	np
PSD***	dnp**	3,0%	np
UC	dnp	2,8%	5%
PORA	3%	1,6%	
Against all			
Not going to vote			
Unsure			20%
* Political parties or election blocs need to collect at least 3% of the total vote for all parties in order to gain seats in parliament.
** "np" stands for "not polled". "dnp" stands for "did not participate".
*** As People's Union "Our Ukraine" running alone (without Civil Movement "People's Self-Defense" a.o.)
† UNB Kostenko and Plyushch became defunct, the original Bloc participant Ukrainian People's Party participated in the election alone

== Ternopil city council ==
The elections to Ternopil city council took place in fall of 2010.

Seats and percentage
Svoboda (34)	56.67%
Party of Regions (9)	15.00%
Our Ukraine (5)	8.33%
Front of Changes (3)	5.00%
Fatherland (2)	3.33%
Ukrainian party (2)	3.33%
UNP (2)	3.33%
For Ukraine! (2)	3.33%
Civil position (1)	1.67%

Mayor elections

- Serhiy Nadal (Svoboda) - 27% (25,988 votes)
- Roman Zastavny (For Ukraine!) - 16% (15,709 votes)
- Petro Hoch (Party of Regions) - 13% (12,630 votes)

== See also ==
- 2010 Ukrainian local elections
- 2008 Kyiv local election
