= Petro Yurchyshyn =

Ukrainian politician

Merited Agricultural Worker Petro Yurchyshyn
- Петро Юрчишин

People's Deputy of Ukraine
- Incumbent
- Assumed office 27 November 2014
- Preceded by: Mykola Katerynchuk
- Constituency: Vinnytsia Oblast, No. 13

Personal details
- Born: 13 July 1958 (age 66); Antratsyt, Ukrainian SSR, Soviet Union (now Ukraine)
- Political party: Independent

Petro Vasyliovych Yurchyshyn (Ukrainian: Петро Васильович Юрчишин; born 13 July 1958) is a Ukrainian politician currently serving as a People's Deputy of Ukraine from Ukraine's 13th electoral district, located in Vinnytsia Oblast. He was previously a member of the Khmilnytsky District Council of the 5th and 6th convocations.

== Biography ==
From 1973 to 1977 he studied at the Kamyanets-Podilsky Agricultural Technical School and received a diploma in mechanical engineering. After graduation, he worked as a senior and later as a chief engineer in the collective farm "Family" (Ukrainian: Родина) Starosinyavsky district of Khmelnytsky region.

1978–1980 – conscript service in the Soviet Army. 1980–1981 – engineer of the Khmilnytsky District Department of Agriculture. 1981–1983 – Chief Engineer of the Great Poultry Farm. 1983–1987 – supply and sales department of Khmelnytsky food factory.

1987–1992 – worked in the system of consumer cooperation. In 1992 he graduated from Vinnytsia Polytechnic Institute, majoring in mechanical engineering. From 1993 to 2001 he was the director of "Experiment" (Ukrainian: Експеримент) LLC. Since 2001 – Director of the agro-industrial research and production enterprise "Visit" (Ukrainian: Візит). Member of the Khmilnytsky District Council of the 5th and 6th convocations.

== Parliamentary activity ==
In 2014, he was elected People's Deputy of Ukraine of the VIII convocation in constituency No. 13, Vinnytsia region, self-nominated.

Date of taking office on 4 December 2014.

Member of the Bloc of Petro Poroshenko parliamentary faction.

Chairman of the Subcommittee on Food Industry and Trade in Agro-industrial Goods of the Verkhovna Rada Committee on Agrarian Policy and Land Relations.

== State awards ==
Diploma of the Cabinet of Ministers of Ukraine (2004)

Merited Agricultural Worker of Ukraine (2006)
