= Ukraine's 13th electoral district =

- Electoral district for the Verkhovna Rada
- Region: Vinnytsia Oblast
- Electorate: 146,373

Current Electoral district
- Created: 2012
Members
Petro Yurchyshyn
Independent

Ukraine's 13th electoral district is a Verkhovna Rada constituency in Vinnytsia Oblast, Central Ukraine. Established in its current form in 2012, it includes the cities of Koziatyn and Khmilnyk and most of the Khmilnyk Raion's territory. The district is home to 146,373 registered voters, and has 235 polling stations. Its member of parliament has been independent Petro Yurchyshyn since 2014.

== People's Deputies ==
Party	Member	Portrait	Took office	Left office	Election	Notes
Batkivshchyna	Mykola Katerynchuk		12 December 2012	27 November 2014	2012	–
Independent	Petro Yurchyshyn		27 November 2014	29 August 2019	2014	Joined Petro Poroshenko Bloc faction
Independent	Petro Yurchyshyn		29 August 2019	Incumbent	2019	Joined For the Future group

== Elections ==
=== 2019 ===
2019 Ukrainian parliamentary election
Party	Candidate	Votes	%	±%
Independent	Petro Yurchyshyn	26,742	36.4	−8.4
Servant of the People	Yuriy Maksymenko	20,033	27.3	New
Holos	Iryna Kolesnyk	6,284	8.6	New
European Solidarity	Oleksandr Krucheniuk	6,204	8.4	−32.9
SiCh	Yurii Boiko	3,664	5.0	New
Independent	Serhii Matviiuk (Note: A member of the Batkivshchyna party, yet ran as an independent.)	3,154	4.3	New
Independent	Valerii Stakhov	2,705	3.7	New
Independent	Oleksandr Repiakh	1,625	2.2	New
Opposition Platform	Andrii Moskaliuk	1,299	1.8	New
Independent	Andrii Verbetskyi (Note: A member of the National Corps party, yet ran as an independent.)	645	0.9	New
Opposition Bloc	Yurii Yaremchuk	630	0.9	−0.1
Social Justice (Ukraine)	Oleh Poberezhnyi	454	0.6	New
Total votes		73,439	100.0	
Independent hold				

=== 2014 ===
2014 Ukrainian parliamentary election
Party	Candidate	Votes	%	±%
Independent	Petro Yurchyshyn	42,025	44.8	+29.4
Petro Poroshenko Bloc	Mykola Katerynchuk	38,744	41.2	−23.1
Independent	Ihor Isakov	7,533	8.0%	New
Independent	Yurii Yaremchuk	1,708	1.8%	+1.3
Radical Party	Serhii Prokhorov	1,356	1.4%	New
Opposition Bloc	Fedir Pavlov	926	1.0%	New
Independent	Iryna Filimonova	881	0.9%	New
Independent	Oleh Kuts	353	0.4%	New
Independent	Serhii Mustia	289	0.3%	New
Total votes		93,815	100.0	
Independent gain from Batkivshchyna				

=== 2012 ===
2012 Ukrainian parliamentary election
Party	Candidate	Votes	%
Batkivshchyna	Mykola Katerynchuk	62,393	64.3%
Independent	Petro Yurchyshyn	14,939	15.4%
KPU	Yurii Haidaiev	8,192	8.4%
Independent	Ihor Zubko	5,266	5.4%
People's	Vasyl Chernii	1,290	1.3%
Party of Regions	Andrii Kavunets	1,200	1.2%
Independent	Oleksandr Shepelev	597	0.6%
Independent	Ihor Dobrutskyi	533	0.5%
Independent	Yurii Yaremchuk	493	0.5%
Independent	Oleksandr Klymchuk	477	0.5%
European Platform	Iryna Herasymova	455	0.5%
KUN	Taras Koval	352	0.4%
Independent	Taras Borysiuk	207	0.2%
New Politics	Mykola Nehrub	203	0.2%
Independent	Lina Palii	191	0.2%
Independent	Serhii Onishchenko	101	0.1%
Independent	Vasyl Susla	72	0.1%
Total votes		96,961	100.0
Batkivshchyna win (new seat)			

== See also ==
- Electoral districts of Ukraine
- Foreign electoral district of Ukraine
