= Chernovetskyi (name) =

Chernovetskyi is a surname. Notable people with the surname include:

- Leonid Chernovetskyi
- Stepan Chernovetskyi

== See also ==
- Leonid Chernovetskyi Bloc
