= Volodymyr Makeyenko =

Ukrainian politician

- Володимир Макеєнко; Владимир Макеенко
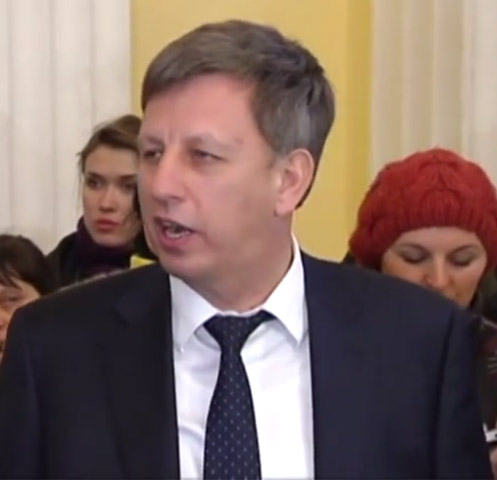

Head of the Kyiv City State Administration
- In office 25 January 2014 – 7 March 2014
- Preceded by: Anatoliy Holubchenko
- Succeeded by: Volodymyr Bondarenko

Personal details
- Born: Vladimir Vladimirovich Makeyenko; 17 July 1965 (age 61) Klintsy, Russian SFSR
- Party: Party of Regions (2003–2014); Solidarity (2000); Socialist Party of Ukraine (1991–2003); Communist Party of Ukraine (????–1991)
- Spouse: Svitlana
- Children: Volodymyr; Pavlo; Maria
- Education: Leningrad Academy of Civil Aviation; Taras Shevchenko National; University
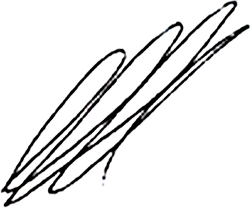
- Signature

Volodymyr Makeyenko (Ukrainian: Володимир Володимирович Макеєнко; Russian: Владимир Владимирович Макеенко, Vladimir Makeienko; born 17 July 1965 in Klintsy, Russia (Note: Both Russia and Ukraine were part of the Soviet Union since 1920 till Ukraine declared its independence from the Soviet Union on 24 August 1991.)) is a Ukrainian politician. From 25 January 2014 to 7 March 2014, he was head of the Kyiv City State Administration.

Makeyenko has a past in various political parties including the Communist Party of the Soviet Union (1986–1991), the Socialist Party of Ukraine (1991–2000) and (he was member of the presidium of its political council) the Party of Regions (2006 till 2015).

== Biography ==
In 1987, Makeyenko graduated from the Leningrad Academy of Civil Aviation in Leningrad in the Russian SFSR and started his working life in 1987 as a manager of an air traffic control center in Boryspil in the Ukrainian SSR. In the 1990 parliamentary election Makeyenko was elected into the Verkhovna Rada (Ukrainian parliament) as a member of the Communist Party of Ukraine elected from constituency number 209 in Boryspil. In parliament he became a member of the Group of 239. In 1992 Makeyenko graduated from the Taras Shevchenko National University of Kyiv. From 1994 till 1995 Makeyenko was Deputy Head of the trade and economic mission of the Embassy of Ukraine in Moscow. After a brief stint as Adviser to Prime Minister of Ukraine Yevhen Marchuk in 1995 and 1996 Makeyenko became Head of the Board of Joint Stock Bank Ukrgazprombank till 1998. In the 1998 parliamentary election Makeyenko was elected into the Verkhovna Rada as a member of the Socialist Party of Ukraine-Peasants' Party of Ukraine Bloc. But in parliament he eventually joined in October 2000 the faction of the party Solidarity. During the 2002 election on an Our Ukraine ticket. This made Makeyenko the youngest ever elected (24 years old) and reelected greatest number of times member of the Verkhovna Rada and a head of the Committee on Rules and Regulation of Verkhovna Rada of Ukraine. In parliament he again left the faction of his election ticket and joined in October 2000 the faction Regions of Ukraine (later to become the biggest party of Ukraine as Party of Regions). At the 2006 parliamentary elections and the 2007 parliamentary elections Makeyenko was elected on the Party of Regions list, of which he is a deputy head in the faction. At the 2012 parliamentary elections he was re-elected into the Verkhovna Rada as number 19 on the Party of Regions national election list. On 25 January 2014, Makeyenko was appointed head of the Kyiv City State Administration by President Viktor Yanukovych. The same day Oleksandr Popov was fired as Head of Kyiv City Administration. (Note: On 14 December 2013 President Yanukovych had suspended Popov. The same day the General Prosecutor of Ukraine's Office handed "a notification on suspicion of abuse of power when ordering the Euromaidan police actions of 30 November 2013" out to Popov.) Acting President Oleksandr Turchynov dismissed Makeyenko from the post of the head of Kyiv City State Administration on 7 March 2014.

In the 2014 Ukrainian parliamentary election Makeyenko was placed 31st on the electoral list of Strong Ukraine. In the election Strong Ukraine failed to clear the 5% election threshold (it got 3.11% of the votes) thus he did not return to parliament.

He did not survive the first round of the Mayoral election.

== Notes ==
Political offices
Preceded by Anatoliy Holubchenko Acting	Head of the Kyiv City State Administration; 2014	Succeeded by Volodymyr Bondarenko
