= Popko =

Popko is a surname. Notable people with the surname include:

- Dmitry Popko (born 1996), Russian-born Kazakhstani tennis player
- Serhiy Popko, Ukrainian military general and the Commander of the Ukrainian Ground Forces
