= Volodymyr Bondarenko (politician) =

Ukrainian politician (1952–2021)

- Володимир Бондаренко
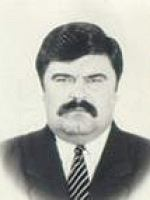

People's Deputy of Ukraine
- In office 23 November 2007 – 13 May 2014
- Constituency: Yulia Tymoshenko Bloc (2007–2012); 219th electoral district (2012–2014)
- In office 7 April 1996 – 25 May 2006
- Constituency: Kyiv, No. 8 (1996–1998); Kyiv, No. 212 (1998–2002); Kyiv, No. 219 (2002–2006)

Head of the Kyiv City State Administration
- In office 7 March 2014 – 25 June 2014
- Preceded by: Volodymyr Makeyenko
- Succeeded by: Vitali Klitschko

Personal details
- Born: 4 December 1952 Okhinky, Ukrainian SSR, Soviet Union (now Ukraine)
- Died: 24 August 2021 (aged 68) Kyiv, Ukraine
- Party: Batkivshchyna (2012–2021); Reforms and Order Party (2002–2012); Independent (1991–2002); Communist Party of the Soviet Union (1977–1991)
- Spouse: Halyna
- Children: 2
- Education: Taras Shevchenko National; University

Volodymyr Dmytrovych Bondarenko (Ukrainian: Володимир Дмитрович Бондаренко; 4 December 1952 – 24 August 2021) was a Ukrainian politician who served as People's Deputy of Ukraine and as member of the citizens' association Choice. Bondarenko was the Head of the Kyiv City Administration from 7 March 2014 until 25 June 2014.

== Biography ==
Bondarenko was born on 4 December 1952 in the village of Okhinky, in Chernihiv Oblast of what was then the Ukrainian Soviet Socialist Republic.

=== Education ===
In 1972, he graduated from Pryluky pedagogical college named after I. Franko, Department of Labor

In 1977, he graduated from Kyiv State University named after T. Shevchenko, History Department, with qualification of history and social science teacher.

In 1998, he graduated from the same university, law faculty, with qualification of lawyer

=== Career ===
From 1976 to 1977, he was a history and geography teacher at Kalynivska 8-year school, Gorodyshchensky district, Cherkasy region.

From 1977 to 1986, he worked at Komsomol and was a member Communist Party of the Soviet Union, and had been part of the Leningradsky Rayon Komsomol Committee, Kyiv Komsomol Committee and Leningrad Rayon Communist Party Committee of Kyiv.

From 1986 to 1990, he was the deputy chairman, the 1st vice-chairman of the Leningrad Rayon Council of People's Deputies of Kyiv.

From 1990 to 1991, he was the Chairman of the Leningrad Rayon Council of People's Deputies of Kyiv.

From 1991 to 1992, he was the Head of the housing department, Deputy Head of the Kyiv City State Administration.

From 1992 to March 1996, he was Head of Marketing Department, JSC "KyivNaftoProduct"

On 27 March 1996, Bondarenko was appointed the Deputy Minister of Justice of Ukraine, Chief of Administrative Service of the Ministry of Justice. He was dismissed from that position on 27 July.

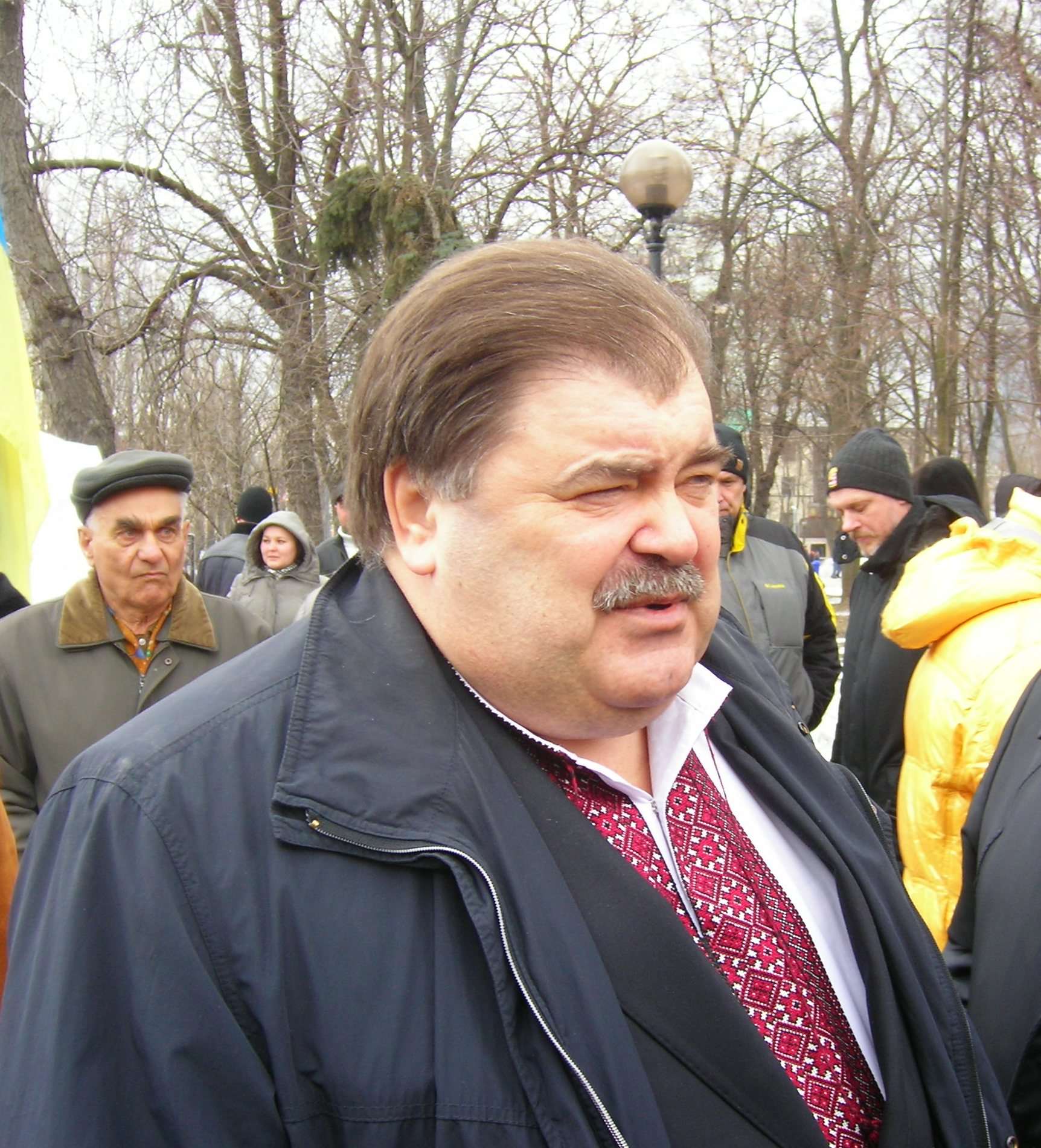
Bondarenko during a rally on 7 April 2013

On 7 March 2014, Bonarenko was appointed the Head of the Kyiv City State Administration.

Bondarenko also entered the faction of Reforms and Order party (leader – Viktor Pynzenyk). He as well actively participated in the Orange Revolution.

=== Business and social activities ===
- JSC "Aktiv"
- JSC "Ukzovnіshpalyvo"
- research and production enterprise (rus. – NPP) "Linoplast" (recycling and waste disposal)
- LLC "Anvi"
- Public Association "We"
- Public organization Festival “Kyivska Rus"
- Charitable Foundation "Ridna Oselya"

== Verkhovna Rada ==
In April 1996, he became the People's Deputy of the 2nd convocation of the Verkhovna Rada of Ukraine in Leningradsky electoral district No. 8 in Kyiv. At the time, he was a member of the committee on the basic industries and social-economic development of the regions.

In March 1998, he was elected to the 3rd convocation of the Verkhovna Rada in electoral district No. 212 in Kyiv. That time, he was a member of the Committee on Industrial Policy.

In April 2002, he was reelected to 4th Verkhovna Rada in electoral district No. 219 in Kyiv, elected from the Yushchenko bloc "Our Ukraine". He was a member of the State Committee on national construction and local self-government issues in June 2002, and was the chairman of the subcommittee on election laws and citizens associations. At the 2006 national parliamentary elections his Reforms and Order Party won in an alliance with PORA 1.47 percent of the popular vote and no seats. After the Kyiv local election 2006 Volodymyr Bondarenko became a deputy in the Kyiv City Council for the Vitaliy Klychko Bloc and was in rigid opposition to the team of then mayor Leonid Chernovetsky. He took an active part in political battles that were unfolding almost at every session of the Kyiv City Council. He actively supported the idea of holding a referendum for impeachment of the mayor and City Council team.

In November 2007, he was reelected to the 6th Verkhovna Rada from the Yulia Tymoshenko Bloc, No. 100 in the list, and was a member of the Budget Committee in December, and was chairman of the subcommittee on tracking the influence of legislation on the budget performance in January 2008.

He had been the chairman of the Subcommittee on tracking the impact of legislation on the budget performance, Budget committee of Verkhovna Rada.

He was the Deputy member of the permanent delegation to the Parliamentary Assembly of the Organization for Security and Cooperation in Europe. He was the Member of the Group for Interparliamentary Relations with China, Chile, Japan, Canada, South Africa, Afghanistan, and Italy,

In the 2012 Ukrainian parliamentary election Bondarenko was Batkivshchyna's candidate in single-member districts number 219 (first-past-the-post wins a parliament seat) located in Kyiv; with 44.2 percent of the votes he was reelected into parliament. His Reforms and Order Party merged into All-Ukrainian Union "Fatherland" in June 2013.

In the 2014 parliamentary election Bondarenko was a candidate in single-member districts number 219 in Kyiv, but this time was defeated by Petro Poroshenko Bloc candidate Oleksandr Tretiakov.

== Local politics ==
In the 2014 Kyiv mayoral elections he finished third, after Vitali Klitschko who won with almost 57% of the vote, with 8% of the vote. He was elected into the Kyiv City Council since his party won three seats.

In the October 2015 Kyiv local elections Bondarenko was again candidate for Mayor of Kyiv for Batkivshchyna. He lost this election (again to Klitschko), but was elected into the Kyiv City Council.

In the October 2020 Kyiv local election Bondarenko was placed third on a Kyiv City Council district list in Kyiv's Shevchenkivskyi District by Batkivshchyna. He was not elected.

== Death ==
Bonderenko died in Kyiv on 24 August 2021.

== Family and hobbies ==
Bondarenko was married to his wife, Halyna (born in 1951), who is a historian,

The couple has two daughters, Oksana (born in 1976). Oksana Velychko (later Rotmanskyi), is a coordinator of the government and civic initiative Together against corruption, while Olha (born in 1981) is working at the law firm Salkom

His hobbies were gardening, horticulture, beekeeping and folk art.

== Criminal charges ==
Bondarenko was the owner of an ethnographic complex "Ukrainian Village" just outside Kyiv, a careful reconstruction of rural life in 19th-century Ukraine. However, there are criminal allegations that he built the village by appropriating State-owned land, and with no license. Bondarenko was investigated in 2005.

As well, the origin of the wealth of the daughter, Ms. Oksana Velychko, has been under severe judicial and press scrutiny, and her credibility as an anti-corruption activist put in doubt

== See also ==
- 2002 Ukrainian parliamentary election
- Our Ukraine-People's Self-Defense Bloc
- 2007 Ukrainian parliamentary election
- List of Ukrainian Parliament Members 2007

Political offices
Preceded by Volodymyr Makeyenko	Head of the Kyiv City State Administration; 2014	Succeeded by Vitali Klitschko
