= Anatoliy Holubchenko =

Ukrainian politician

- Анатолій Голубченко
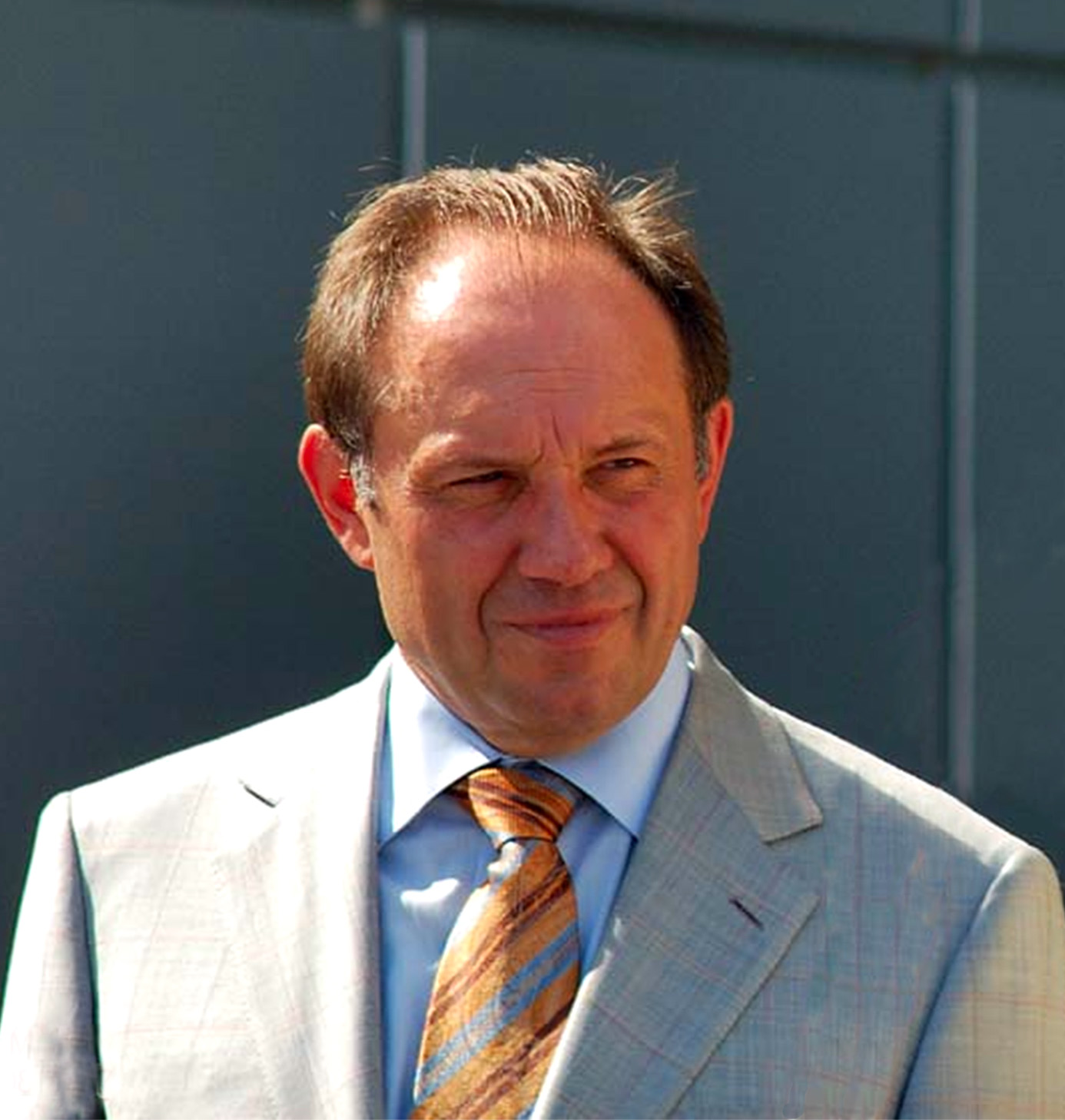
- Holubchenko in 2007

temporary acting Head of the Kyiv City State Administration
- In office 14 December 2013 – 25 January 2014
- Preceded by: Oleksandr Popov
- Succeeded by: Volodymyr Makeyenko

First Vice Prime Minister
- In office 8 August 1997 – 14 January 1999
- Preceded by: Vasyl Durdynets
- Succeeded by: Volodymyr Kuratchenko

Minister of Industry
- In office October 1992 – July 1995
- Preceded by: Mykhailo Pavlovsky
- Succeeded by: Valeriy Mazur

Personal details
- Born: Anatoliy Kostiantynovych Holubchenko; 6 June 1950 (age 76) Zhdanov, Ukrainian SSR
- Party: Party of Regions
- Education: Zhdanov Metallurgy Institute
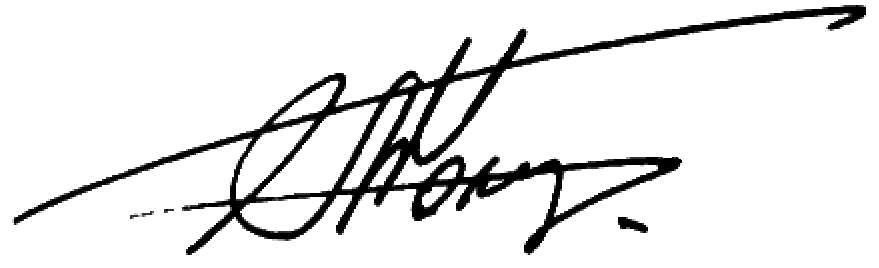
- Signature

Anatoliy Kostiantynovych Holubchenko (Ukrainian: Анатолій Костянтинович Голубченко; born 6 June 1950) is a Ukrainian politician. From 14 December 2013 to 25 January 2014, he was a temporary acting head of the Kyiv City State Administration.

== Early life ==
Holubchenko was born on 6 June 1950 in Zhdanov, which was then part of Donetsk Oblast in the Soviet Union (now Mariupol). In 1972, he graduated from the Zhdanov Metallurgical Institute, and afterwards working as a hot-rolling mill operator for the Illich Steel and Iron Works factory. He then served his mandatory military services in the Armed Forces of the Soviet Union, before returning to the Illich plant where he worked for the next twelve years. In 1986, he moved to Dnipro where he worked in the Ministry of Ferrous Metallurgy of the Ukrainian SSR, and then as Deputy General Director of Zaporizhstal.

== Political career ==
Upon the collapse of the Soviet Union, he moved to Kyiv to start working in politics and became First Deputy Chairman of the State Committee of Ukraine for the Metallurgical Industry, before eventually being promoted to Minister of Industry of Ukraine. Following his term as minister, during the 1994 Ukrainian parliamentary election he was elected a member of the Verkhovna Rada in its 2nd convocation for the city of Berdiansk in Zaporizhzhia. In the Rada, he was a member of the Commission on Basic Industries and Socio-Economic Development of Regions. He was appointed First Vice Prime Minister afterwards under then Prime Minister Valeriy Pustovoitenko. However, he resigned after a short amount of time to serve as First Deputy Chairman of the State Property Fund but left politics shortly after to serve as a consultant to the Stakhanov Ferroalloy Plant in Luhansk Oblast. He then, for some time, returned to metallurgy and became part of the board of Ukrelectroapparat in Khmelnytskyi.

On 14 December 2013 President Viktor Yanukovych suspended Holubchenko's predecessor Oleksandr Popov. The same day the General Prosecutor of Ukraine's Office handed "a notification on suspicion of abuse of power when ordering the Euromaidan police actions of 30 November 2013" out to Popov and Holubchenko was appointed acting Head of Kyiv City Administration. On 24 December 2013 Holubchenko stated that he regularly met with (his predecessor) Popov.

Holubchenko led a crackdown against the sex trade in Kyiv during the Euro 2012 football tournament, ordering the police and SBU to investigate brochures advertising massage parlors across the city.

== Personal life ==
As of 2025, he resides in Ukraine in the village of Kozyn, which he has owned since working in Kyiv.

Political offices
| Preceded by Oleksandr Popov | Head of the Kyiv City State Administration; 2013-2014 | Succeeded by Volodymyr Makeyenko |
