= Stepan Chernovetskyi =

Ukrainian businessman (born 1978)

- Степан Черновецький
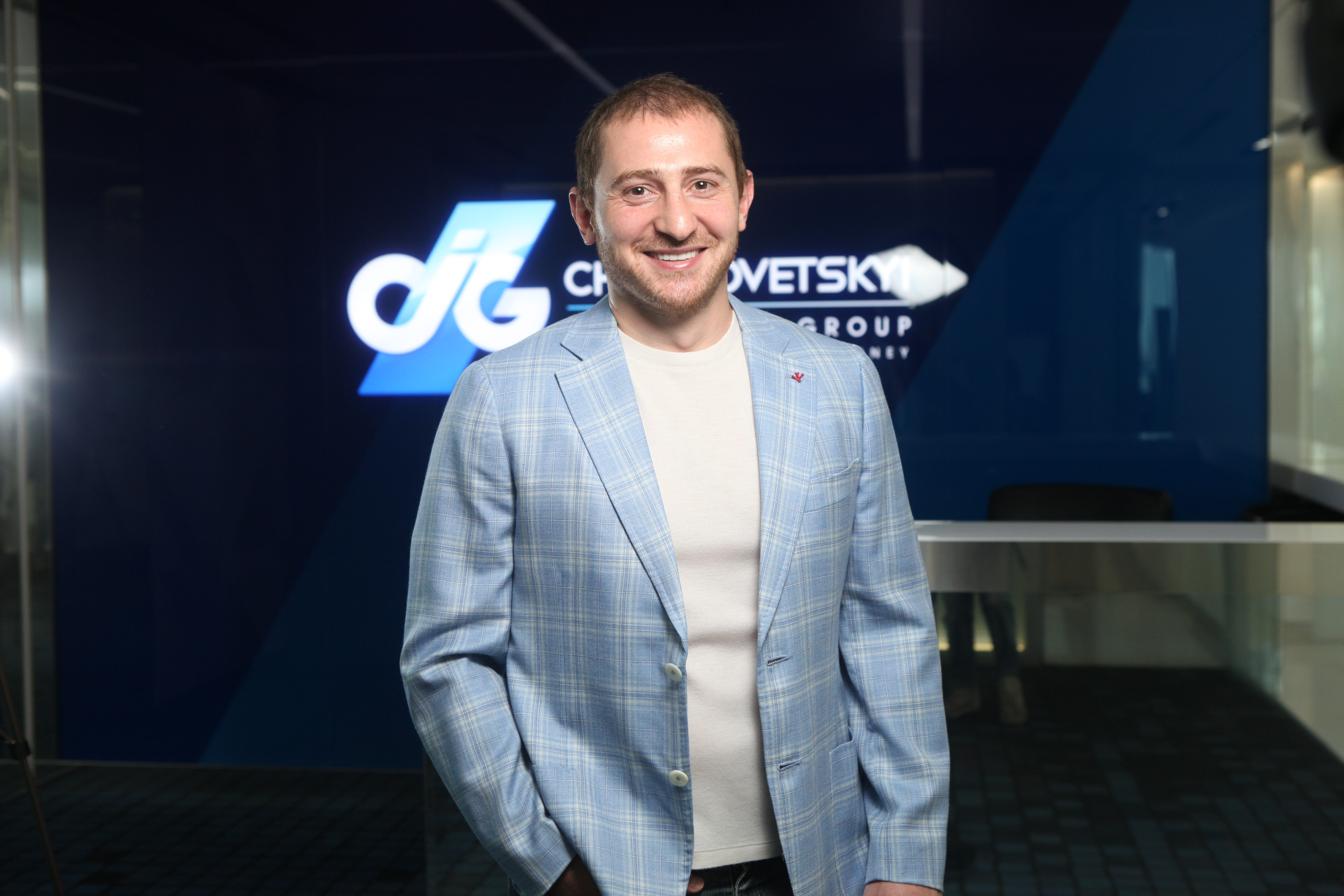
- Chernovetskyi in 2008
- Born: 28 October 1978 (age 48); Tbilisi, Georgian SSR, Soviet Union
- Occupations: Businessman; investor
- Political party: Independent
- Spouse: Zhanna Chernovetska
- Children: 5

Stepan Leonidovych Chernovetskyi (Ukrainian: Степан Леонідович Черновецький; born 28 October 1978) is a Ukrainian businessman, investor, and founder of Chernovetskyi Investment Group (CIG).

== Biography ==
Chernovetskyi was born in Tbilisi on 28 October 1978.

In 2003, he graduated from the Faculty of Law of Taras Shevchenko National University of Kyiv.

== Business ==
In 1997, Chernovetskyi started working as a customer service manager at Pravex-Bank, established by his father Leonid Chernovetskyi, and then headed various departments of the bank, including the Main Department of the branch network.

Until 2006, Chernovetskyi Jr. was the bank's senior vice president. In May 2006, he became the president of the Supervisory Board of Pravex Bank.

The shareholders decided to sell the bank in 2007. Chernovetskyi negotiated the deal with an Italian banking group Intesa Sanpaolo. In February 2008, Pravex Bank was sold for $750 million. In September 2008, at the shareholders' meeting, it was decided that Chernovetskyi would resign as the head of the bank's supervisory board.

In early 2021, Stepan Chernovetskyi became the owner of a company that financed the construction of three residential complexes in Kyiv – Asset Management Company "Valprim".

== CIG ==
Chernovetskyi is the owner and president of Chernovetskyi Investment Group (CIG), a company founded in 2013 specializing in the investments in IT-projects, e-commerce, infrastructure, healthcare, and agricultural sector.

As of September 2018, CIG is one of the largest investment companies in Eastern Europe with an investment potential of over $100 million.

The company has more than 30 projects in seven countries. The fund's portfolio includes Ukrainian IT companies Doc.ua, Softcube and Zakaz.ua.

In 2017, CIG invested in InnerChef (India), a delivery service of ready meals, and in a startup Kray Technologies (Ukraine), a manufacturer of industrial drones for agricultural enterprises.

In Forbes Ukraine's ranking "10 Venture Capital Funds" CIG ranks 9th with the fund’s size of $100 million.

In Forbes Ukraine's "Top 20 Wealthiest Ukrainians 2022", Chernovetskyi ranked 18th, with an estimated fortune of $350 million. In the Top 100 Wealthiest Ukrainians 2021 published by Novoye Vremya, he ranks 32nd, with an estimated fortune of $346 million.

Korrespondent magazine in its ranking The Wealthiest 2021, estimated the wealth of Chernovetskyi at $132 million.

In 2021 Forbes Ukraine's "Top 100 Wealthiest Businessmen" ranked Chernovetskyi 13th with an estimated fortune of $545 million.

== Social projects ==
In 2017, CIG established the CIG R&D Lab educational scholarship program to implement innovative projects by students and young scientists. In the 2017–2018 academic year, a pilot phase of the program was held jointly with Odesa Polytechnic University (ONPU). In August 2018, CIG signed a memorandum of cooperation with Kharkiv Polytechnic Institute, and in September 2019 – with the Lviv Polytechnic National University.

In January 2018, the Kyiv School of Economics and CIG signed a partnership agreement in the area of development and research in the field of IT and economics for the project "Development of ProZorro.Sales". Within the framework of cooperation, CIG provided financial assistance in the amount of 100 thousand US dollars. As a prerequisite, CIG does not participate in the project.

== Charity ==
Chernovetskyi is a sponsor of social projects within the Chernovetskyi Charity Fund, which implements projects mainly in Georgia. Chernovetskyi participated in the work of the fund "Social Partnership", which operated until 1 January 2017.

== Politics ==
In 2008 and 2009, Chernovetskyi was a representative at the Kyiv City Council and a member of the "Leonid Chernovetskyi Bloc" party. He participated in the Commission on budget and socio-economic development. He left the office before the end of term. As of September 2018, Chernovetskyi does not belong to any political party.

== Criminal Investigation in Spain ==
In July 2016, Spanish police detained Chernovetskyi as a part of "Variola" special operation against financial crimes.

In August 2016, the Barcelona Court of Appeal discharged Chernovetskyi from custody citing insufficient evidence in the detention report.

In October 2019, the court in Barcelona closed a criminal case (preliminary investigation) against Chernovetskyi establishing the legal origin of his investments in Spain and lack of evidence of criminal offense.

The Spanish media reported that the case against Chernovetskyi was closed, in particular, on the basis of forensic reports on origination of funds.

The Public Prosecutor's Office filed an appeal against decision of the Barcelona Court of 30 October 2019 which closed the criminal case (preliminary investigation) against Chernovetskyi.

On 1 July 2020, the Barcelona Court of Appeal rejected the Prosecutor's appeal and upheld the Barcelona court's decision of 30 October 2019.

The Barcelona Court of Appeal confirmed the legal origin of investment made by Chernovetskyi in Spain.

In its decision, the Court indicated that there was no evidence of any connection between the invested funds and any criminal offenses.

== Elite Boxing Promotion ==
Chernovetskyi owns "Elite Boxing Promotion", a company which organizes boxing tournaments and engages in the development of boxing in Ukraine. Their leading boxer Victor Postol is an ex-WBC light-welterweight world champion.

== Personal life ==
Chernovetskyi's father is Leonid Chernovetskyi, Ukrainian statesman and politician, businessman, and former mayor of Kyiv. His mother is Alina Aivazova, a fellow businesswoman.

Chernovetskyi is married to Zhanna Chernovetska. They have five children.
