= 2020 Kyiv local elections =

- 25 October 2020
- Mayoral election
- Turnout: 34,38% ▼7.45 pp
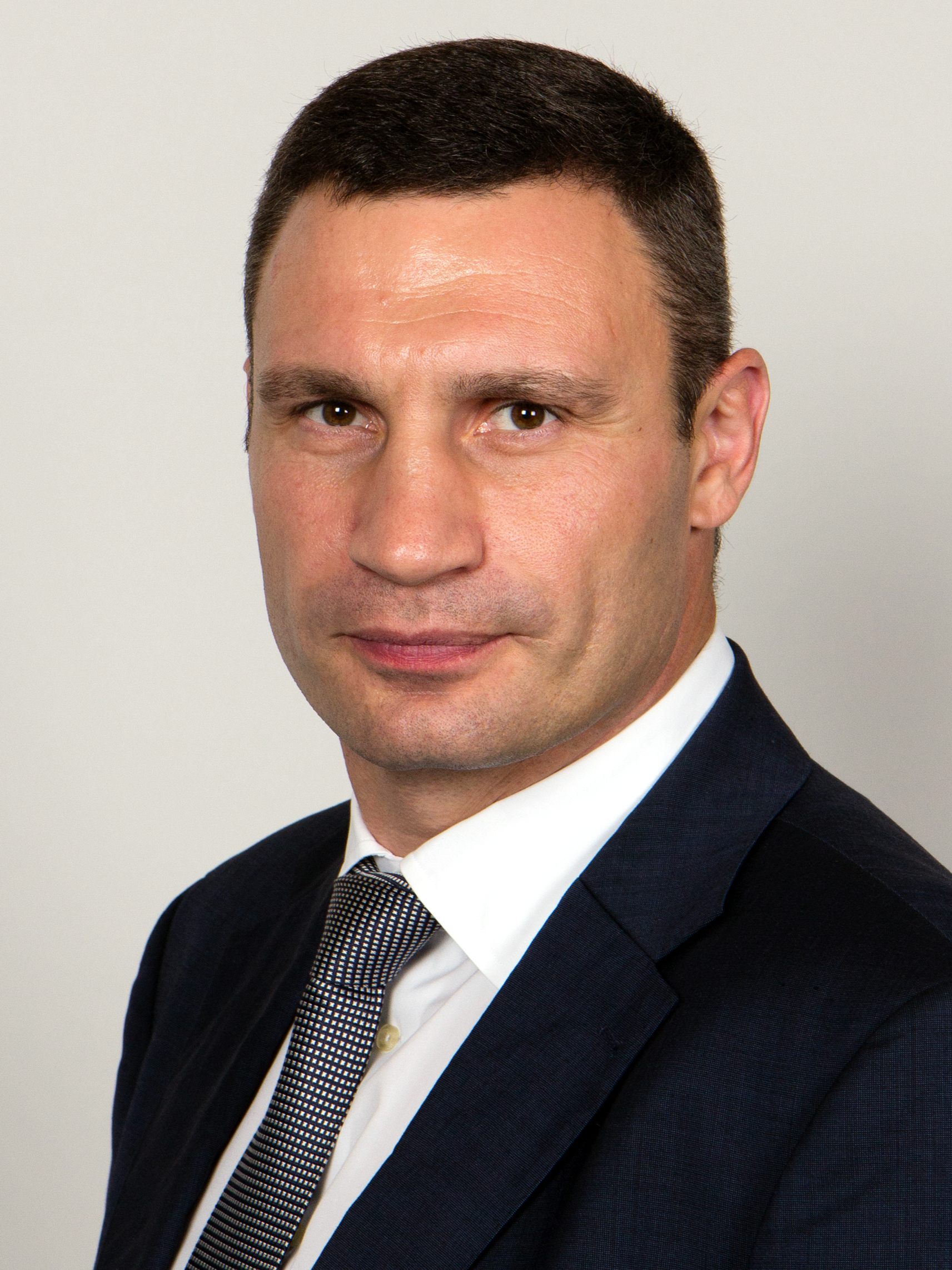

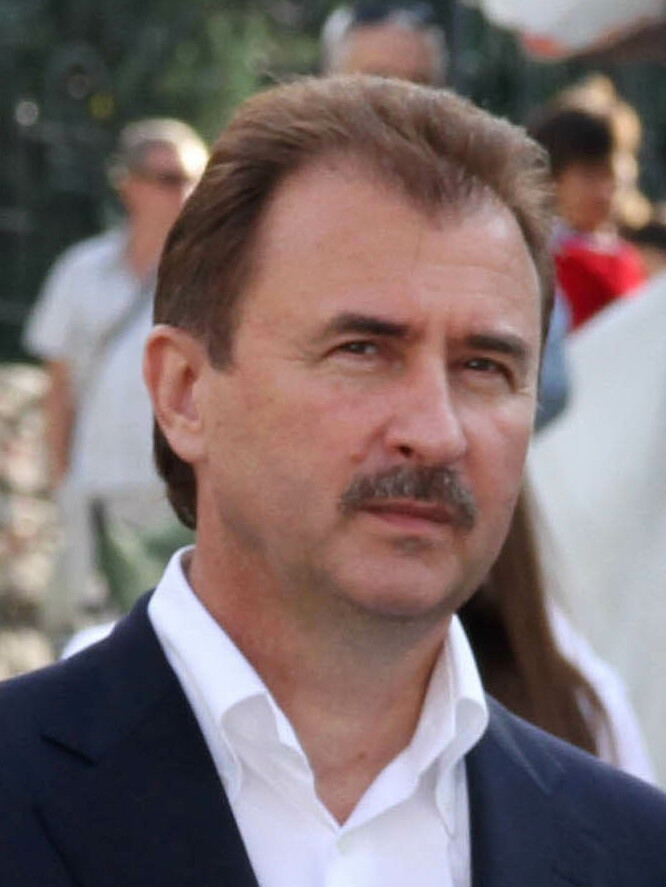

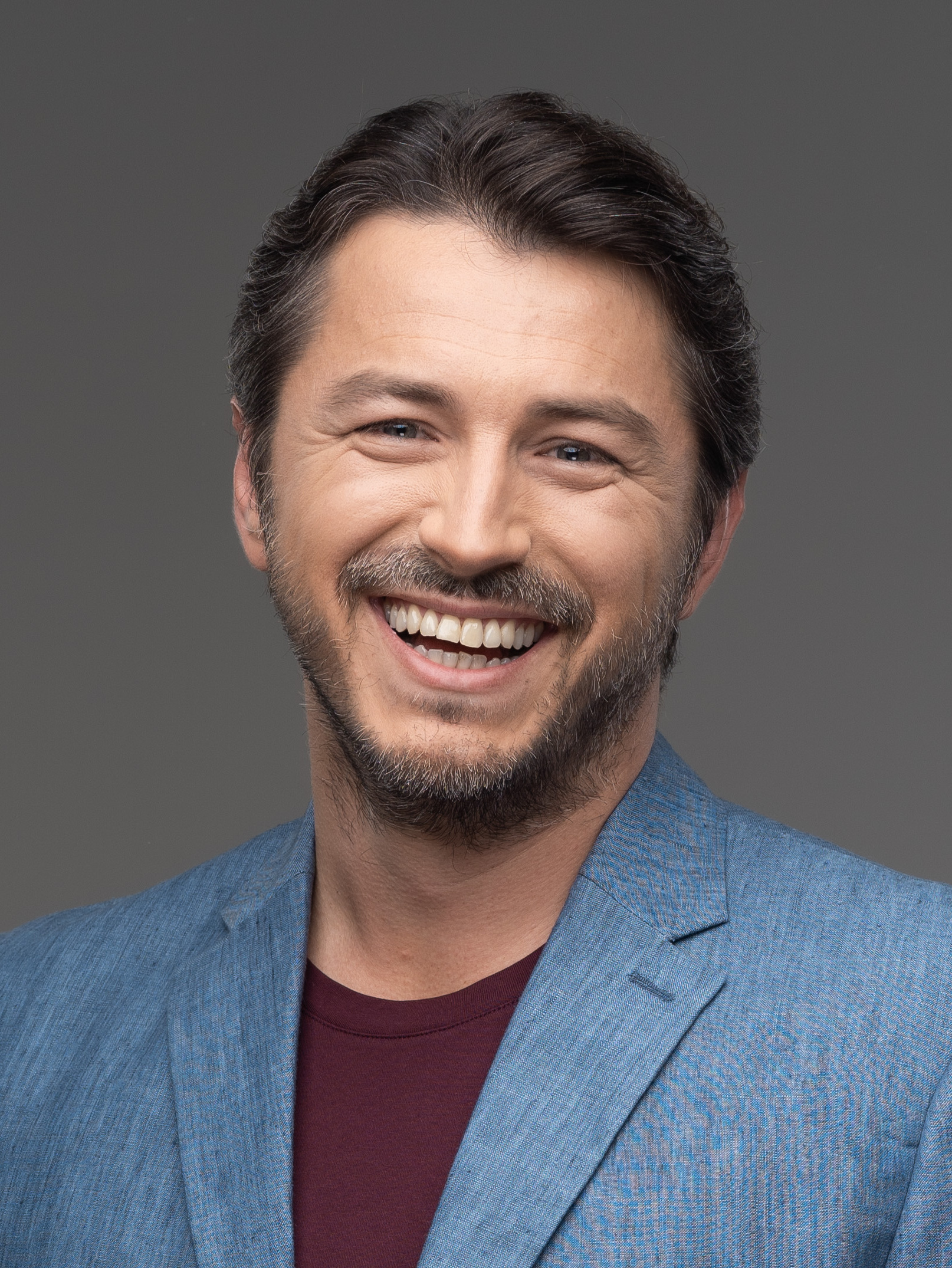

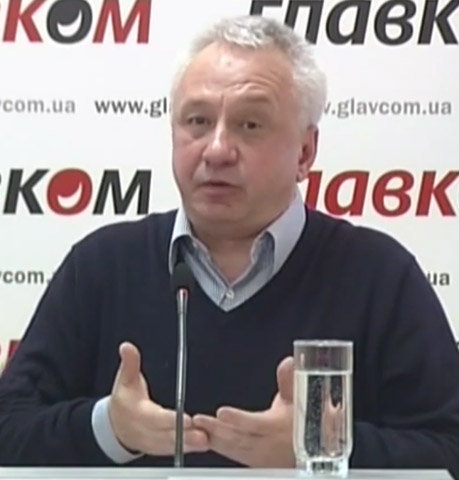

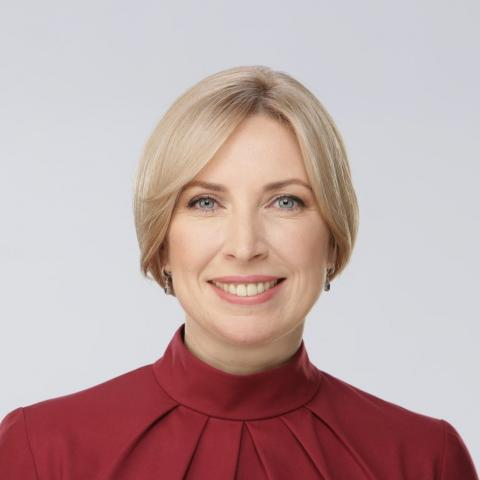

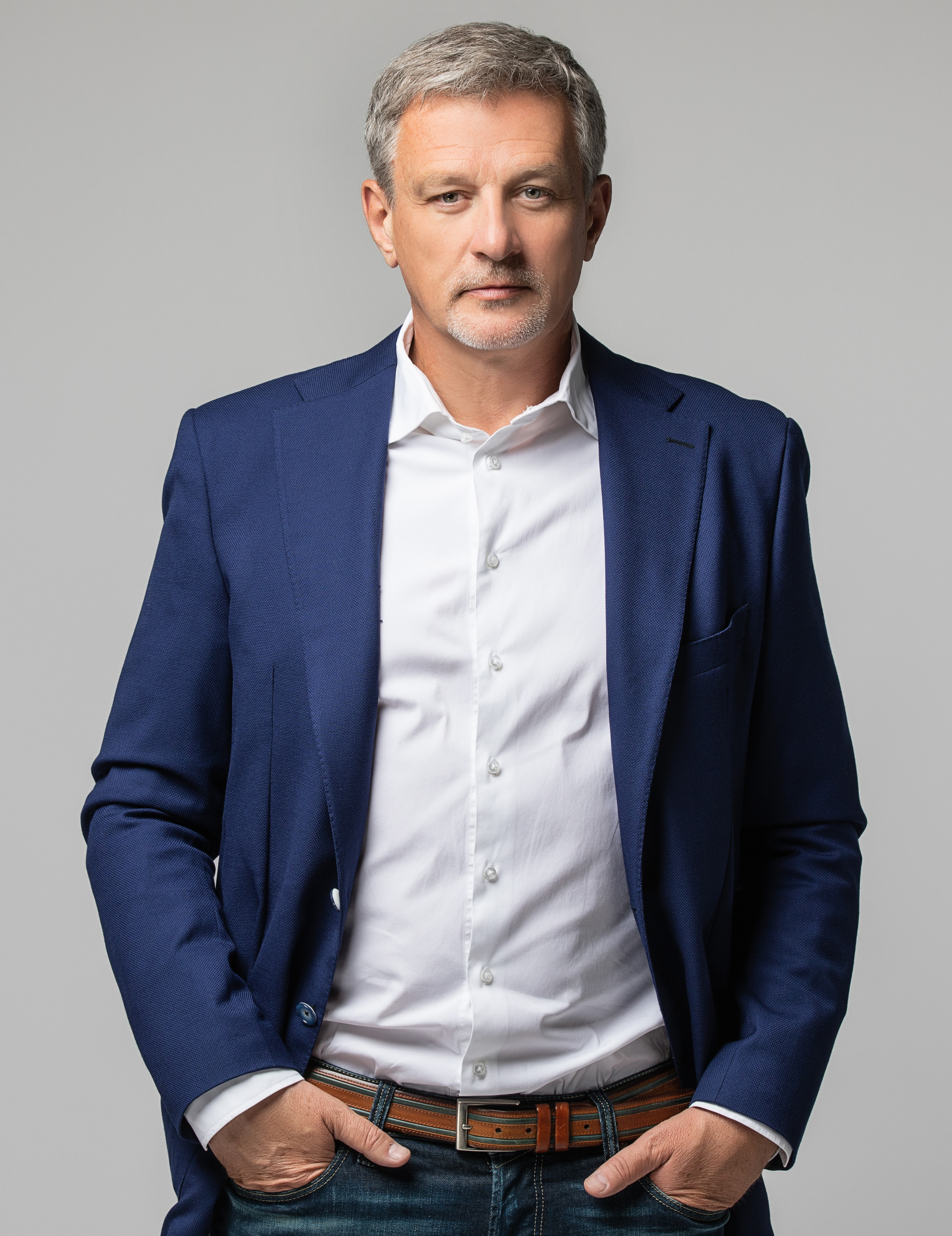
Candidate	Vitali Klitschko	Oleksandr Popov	Serhiy Prytula
Party	UDAR	Opposition Platform	Holos
Popular vote	365,161	68,757	56,900
Percentage	50.51%	9.51%	7.87%
Candidate	Oleksiy Kucherenko	Iryna Vereshchuk	Andriy Palchevskyi
Party	Batkivshchyna	Servant of the People	PP
Popular vote	56,900	39,321	38,360
Percentage	6.33%	5.44%	5.35%
Mayor before election
Vitali Klitschko
BPP
Elected mayor
Vitali Klitschko
UDAR
- Council election
- All 120 seats in the Kyiv City Council; 61 seats needed for a majority
Party	Leader	Vote %	Seats	+/–
YeS (Note: YeS (then BPP) ran together with UDAR in 2015 Kyiv local election)	Maryna Poroshenko	20.53	31	−21
UDAR	Vitali Klitschko	19.99	30	New
Unity	Oleksandr Omelchenko	8.75	14	−1
OPZZh	Oleksandr Popov	7.81	12	New
SN	Yevhenia Kuleba	7.54	12	New
Batkivshchyna	Oleksiy Kucherenko	7.50	12	−5
Holos	Maksym Nefyodov	5.98	9	New
This lists parties that won seats. See the complete results below.
Detailed results map of the election per district
Secretary before	Secretary after
Volodymyr Prokopiv; BPP	Volodymyr Bondarenko; UDAR

The 2020 Kyiv local elections were held on 25 October 2020 to elect the Mayor of Kyiv and the 120-seat City Council as a part of wider 2020 Ukrainian local elections, which took place on the same day.

== Electoral system ==
These were the first elections held under the newly adopted Electoral Code, which provided a fully proportional electoral system at the both local and national levels.

Kyiv was divided into 13 districts with an unfixed amount of seats. Each party had to form two lists: the first is united for the entire city, and the second is for individual territorial districts. The party would receive a mandate if it overcomes the 5% threshold. In this case, the №1 candidate on the list is guaranteed to receive a seat. Candidates who receive 25% or more of the electoral quota of their district get to the top of the list in descending order of the number of votes for them. In the case of an equal number of votes, the order of candidates will remain as determined by the party at the time of voting. After the candidates who passed to the council according to the quota, the rest are placed in the order determined by the party.

Electoral quota is the number of votes needed to obtain one seat. The electoral quota is determined by the territorial election commission. For this, the commission needed to divide the total number of votes for those parties that won at least 5 percent of the voters' votes and are now participating in the distribution of mandates by the number of mandates. The number of seats into which the electoral votes had to be divided is the difference between the number of seats in the council and the number of guaranteed seats for each party that entered the council (one seat per party).

== Opinion polls ==
=== City Council election ===
Fieldwork date	Polling firm	Sample size		Ukrainian Democratic Alliance for Reform	Self Reliance (political party)	Batkivshchyna		Svoboda (political party)		Opposition Bloc				Holos (political party)	Opposition Platform — For Life	Servant of the People				Other	Lead
25 October 2020	Rating	10,402	18,0	21,3	—	6,6	6,8	3,0	—	—	—	—	—	7,2	6,7	9,5	3,5	1,6	3,9	12,0	3,3
25 October 2020	Liberty Report/Ukraine 24	39,622	17,8	19,7	—	8,6	5,9	3,7	—	—	—	—	—	5,7	7,8	10,3	4,5	1,3	4,1	10,6	1,9
Exit polls
20-22 September 2020	Info Sapiens/IRI	540	22	13	0	5	1	1	—	1	—	—	0	7	7	13	3	—	3	24	10
4-9 September 2020	Rating	1,200	13,1	23,6	—	7,3	2,3	1,7	—	—	—	—	1,5	8,2	7,4	13,6	3,4	—	3,9	14,1	10,0
31 August-1 September 2020	Rating	1,200	14,0	28,6	0,8	6,4	2,7	2,6	—	—	—	—	0,4	6,5	6,8	10,7	5,5	—	6,9	8,0	14,6
1-2 August 2020	Active Group	1,204	17,9	20,1	—	5,8	2,5	4,1	—	—	—	—	—	3,2	8,8	18,7	1,9	1,6	7,1	8,3	1,4
24 July-2 August 2020	Razumkov Centre	2,019	11,4	19,8	0,6	5,5	2,6	3,4	—	—	—	—	0,4	4,3	11,5	15,0	5,5	2,1	7,1	10,8	4,8
26-27 July 2020	Rating	2,000	19,8	17,1	1,3	5,7	1,4	2,5	—	0,3	—	—	1,3	4,6	8,0	19,3	3,0	—	4,5	11,0	0,5
20 June-2 July 2020	Razumkov Centre	2,205	20,4	11,5	0,6	7,5	1,4	2,0	—	1,7	—	—	2,2	1,2	10,6	19,3	5,1	0,6	6,2	9,8	1,1
30 June-1 July 2020	Active Group	812	9,9	22,4	1,8	10,5	2,7	4,2	—	2,9	—	—	—	2,9	6,8	21,2	2,4	0,5	3,9	7,9	1,2
17-19 June 2020	Active Group	800	7,4	23,1	—	8,1	2,7	4,2	—	3,3	—	—	—	3,3	6,1	22,7	2,8	—	—	16,4	0,4
10-15 June 2020	SMC	1,000	13,5	17,6	—	6,5	4,2	3,2	—	3,3	—	—	—	5,7	4,0	23,8	4,7	6,3	—	7,1	6,2
4-7 April 2020	Rating/	2,000	18,6	13,5	1,2	9,4	1,8	2,9	—	0,8	—	—	1,9	5,9	7,2	22,3	3,2	—	—	11,4	3,7
25 January-17 February 2020	Rating/IRI	585	15,2	7,6	—	10,6	—	3,0	—	1,5	—	—	3,0	4,5	7,6	27,3	3,0	—	—	16,6	12,1
15-16 February 2020	Active Group	1,500	12,7	5,5	3,9	12,0	—	5,5	—	—	—	—	2,0	9,5	6,9	28,9	5,6	—	—	7,3	16,2
19-24 December 2019	SMC	1,000	11,0	14,1	0,3	7,3	1,9	5,6	1,9	3,1	—	—	—	3,7	6,2	27,1	4,1	5,3	—	8,4	13
12-16 December 2019	Rating	1,000	8,9	12,4	0,7	6,4	3,0	4,6	2,3	0,3	—	—	3,3	6,9	4,8	32,2	2,6	1,3	—	10,1	19,8
6 September-10 October 2019	Rating/IRI	647	11,9	4,5	—	7,5	—	3,0	—	1,5	—	—	1,5	4,5	4,5	50,8	1,5	—	—	9,5	38,9
16-17 November 2019	Active Group	1,500	12,8	—	—	16,1	—	4,2	—	—	—	—	3,6	7,9	8,1	34,8	4,0	—	—	8,6	18,7
6-11 November 2019	SMC	1,014	8,6	7,5	1,1	7,5	2,1	3,1	2,1	2.1	—	—	2,3	4,2	5,3	34,1	6,3	2,1	—	12,8	25,5
4-13 September 2018	KIIS	800	12,1	4,3	7,4	11,8	—	5,3	—	1,8	—	—	6,3	14,9	6,7	6,7	—	—	—	22,4	2,8
25 October 2015	2015 Kyiv local election		27,56		11,81	8,92	7,81	7,73	4,83	4,80	4,57	3,14	2,85	—	—	—	—	—	—	15,97	15,75

=== Mayoral election ===
Fieldwork date	Polling firm	Sample size	Klychko	Poroshenko	Honcharenko	Bereza	Omelchenko	Bondarenko	Kucherenko	Nestor	Husovskyi	Myrnyi	Illienko	Puzanov	Dumchev	Hatsko	Prytula	Popov	Tkachenko	Vereshchuk	Tyshchenko	Liashko	Smeshko	Tomenko	Palchevskyi	Other	Lead
25 October 2020	Rating	10,402	47,8	—	—	1,1	2,6	—	6,3	—	0,6	—	2,2	—	—	—	8,3	8,6	—	8,0	—	—	3,4	2,2	4,5	2,9	39,2
25 October 2020	Liberty Report/Ukraine 24	39,622	45,9	—	—	1,8	2,7	—	7,8	—	0,6	—	2,5	—	—	—	7,3	9,6	—	8,5	—	—	3,7	2,1	4,8	2,7	36,3
Exit polls
20-22 September 2020	Info Sapiens/IRI	521	47	—	3	2	3	—	2	—	—	—	1	—	—	—	10	9	—	6	—	—	—	1	5	12	37
4-9 September 2020	Rating	1,200	43,6	—	—	1,5	4,2	—	5,7	—	0,4	—	1,1	—	—	—	9,8	5,8	—	6,9	—	—	—	2,0	6,4	12,5	33,8
1-2 August 2020	Active Group	1,204	36,4	—	4,8	2,8	5,1	—	—	2,0	—	—	4,0	—	—	—	8,0	5,6	—	11,3	—	—	—	2,1	11,6	6,4	24,8
24 July-2 August 2020	Razumkov Centre	2,019	41,2	—	3,1	2,0	3,9	—	—	1,4	—	—	2,5	—	—	—	5,5	8,3	—	6,2	—	—	4,6	2,4	9,1	10,8	9,7
26-27 July 2020	Rating	2,000	41,7	—	5,4	2,0	3,3	—	—	2,1	—	—	2,6	—	—	—	11,6	4,5	—	9,4	—	—	—	—	9,0	11,0	8,7
20 June-2 July 2020	Razumkov Centre	2,205	43,7	—	3,2	2,4	4,2	—	—	2,1	—	—	3,3	—	—	—	3,8	3,8	—	—	—	6,3	5,0	2,1	11,0	9,8	9,1
30 June-1 July 2020	Active Group	812	38,0	—	4,1	—	5,6	—	6,0	2,4	—	—	4,6	—	—	—	4,2	7,2	7,8				—	2,5	9,2	8,6	28,8
17-19 June 2020	Active Group	800	36,6	—	3,1	—	6,4	—	2,9	—	—	—	—	—	—	—	4,5	3,0	—	—	—	2,8	—	6,1	9,5	27,9	27,1
10-15 June 2020	SMC	1,000	47,0	—	2,3	2,9	4,2	—	—	2,9	—	—	2,8	—	—	—	4,4	6,4	—	—	3,7	—	—	6,8	11,6	12,2	35,4
4-7 April 2020	Rating/	2,000	38,7	—	—	4,4	6,4	3,5	—	—	—	—	3,7	—	—	—	9,1	5,2	8,8	—	—	—	—	—	8,2	12	29,6
19-24 December 2019	SMC	1,000	36,7	—	—	3,6	—	2,1	—	—	0,9	—	3,2	—	—	—	8,9	7,2	5,9	—	—	—	—	8,3	11,8	5,3	24,9
6-11 November 2019	SMC	1,014	26,9	—	—	3,2	6,5	3,2	—	—	2,2	—	2,2	—	—	—	4,3	6,5	7,5	—	—	—	4,3	5,4	8,6	19,2	20,2
11-22 October 2019	KIIS	803	36,6	—	—	5,7	—	3,2	—	—	1,5	—	4,7	—	—	—	—	8,6	18,0	—	—	—	—	8,1	12,6	1,5	18,6
2-3 March 2019	Active Group	1,800	38,1	—	—	6,6	11,6	3,6	—	—	3,2	1,1	—	1,3	—	—	—	—	—	—	—	—	—	—	—	35,0	26,5
4-13 September 2018	KIIS	800	48,8	—	—	15,7	—	6,1	—	—	5,7	0,6	—	0,2	—	—	—	—	—	—	—	—	—	19,5	—	3,5	29,3
22-31 May 2017	Rating	826	52,5	—	—	11,3	6,1	7,9	—	—	2	1,1	—	1,9	1,1	1,6	—	—	—	—	—	—	—	—	—	15,0	41,2
16-20 September 2016	Rating	1,000	34,6	—	—	11,9	8,4	8,9	—	—	5,3	2,4	—	3,7	3,2	2,4	—	—	—	—	—	—	—	—	—	19,2	22,7
25 October 2015	2015 Kyiv local election		40,57			8,85	8,47	7,86			7,72	4,39		4,19	3,92	2,77	—	—	—				—	—	—	11,26	31,72

== Results ==
=== City Council election ===
Graph of the party split among 120 seats.
Party	Votes	%	Seats	+/-
European Solidarity	141,978	20.53	31	–21
Ukrainian Democratic Alliance for Reform	138,239	19.99	30	New
Unity of Oleksandr Omelchenko	60,496	8.75	14	–1
Opposition Platform — For Life	54,025	7.81	12	New
Servant of the People	52,124	7.54	12	New
Batkivshchyna	51,855	7.50	12	–5
Holos	41,327	5.98	8	New
Victory of Palchevskyi	31,547	4.56	0	New
Strength and Honour	22,915	3.31	0	0
Svoboda	21,754	3.15	0	–14
Party of Shariy	18,779	2.72	0	New
Democratic Axe	11,299	1.63	0	New
Native Country	10,499	1.52	0	New
People's Power	7,766	1.12	0	New
For the Future	5,141	0.74	0	New
Ecological Alternative	4,529	0.65	0	New
EcoParty of Bereza	4,491	0.65	0	New
Our Land	3,477	0.50	0	0
Right Sector	2,560	0.37	0	New
Radical Party of Oleh Liashko	2,340	0.34	0	0
Proposition	1,688	0.24	0	New
Wave	1,496	0.22	0	New
Together We Are Strength	634	0.09	0	New
Party of National Egoism	629	0.09	0	New
Total	691,588	100.00	120	0
Valid votes	691,588	95.73		
Invalid/blank votes	30,825	4.27		
Total votes	722,449	100.00		
Registered voters/turnout	2,101,350	34.38		
Source: CEC

=== Mayoral election ===
Candidate	Party	Votes	%
Vitali Klitschko	Ukrainian Democratic Alliance for Reform	365,161	50.51
Oleksandr Popov	Opposition Platform — For Life	68,757	9.51
Serhii Prytula	Holos	56,900	7.87
Oleksiy Kucherenko	Batkivshchyna	45,823	6.33
Iryna Vereshchuk	Servant of the People	39,321	5.44
Andrii Palchevskyi	Victory of Palchevskyi	38,360	5.35
Ihor Smeshko	Strength and Honour	22,418	3.14
Oleksandr Omelchenko	Unity of Oleksandr Omelchenko	21,542	2.98
Mykola Tomenko	Native Country	15,039	2.08
Andrii Illienko	Svoboda	14,519	2.01
Boryslav Bereza	EcoParty of Bereza	7,448	1.03
Yurii Levchenko	People's Power	6,570	0.95
Serhii Husovskyi	For the Future	3,119	0.43
Yehor Firsov	Ecological Alternative	2,759	0.38
Viktor Petruk	Wave	1,844	0.25
Maksym Holdarb	Independent	1,659	0.23
Serhii Shakhov	Our Land	1,608	0.22
Mykhailo Pozhyvanov	Radical Party of Oleh Liashko	1,388	0.19
Diana Hrantseva	Independent	844	0.11
Olena Filonova	Together We Are Strength	456	0.06
Total		715,535	100.00
Valid votes		715,535	99.04
Invalid/blank votes		6,914	0.96
Total votes		722,449	100.00
Registered voters/turnout		2,101,350	34.38
Source: CEC
