= Ukrainian Credit-Banking Union =

Ukrainian banking association

The Ukrainian Credit-Banking Union (Ukrainian: Український кредитно-банківський союз, romanized: Ukrainskyi kredytno-bankivskyi soyuz) is a banking association created as the Kyiv Banking Union in 1994 by twenty commercial banks operating in the city of Kyiv, Ukraine, for the purpose of cooperation between Kyiv's financial institutions, and to manage collective interaction with authorities.

== History ==
The organization has expanded to nearly a hundred members, operating throughout the country and in 2005 reincorporated under its current name. The Ukrainian Credit-Banking Union works with Committees of the Verkhovna Rada (the Ukrainian parliament); the National Bank of Ukraine (Ukraine's central bank); the Ukrainian Ministry of Justice, and the tax administration of Ukraine to discuss improvement of banking legislation and other relevant matters.

Prominent banker and politician Leonid Chernovetsky was the founder and leader of the union.
