= State Archives of the City of Kyiv =

Державний архів міста Києва (ДАК) State Archives of the City of Kyiv
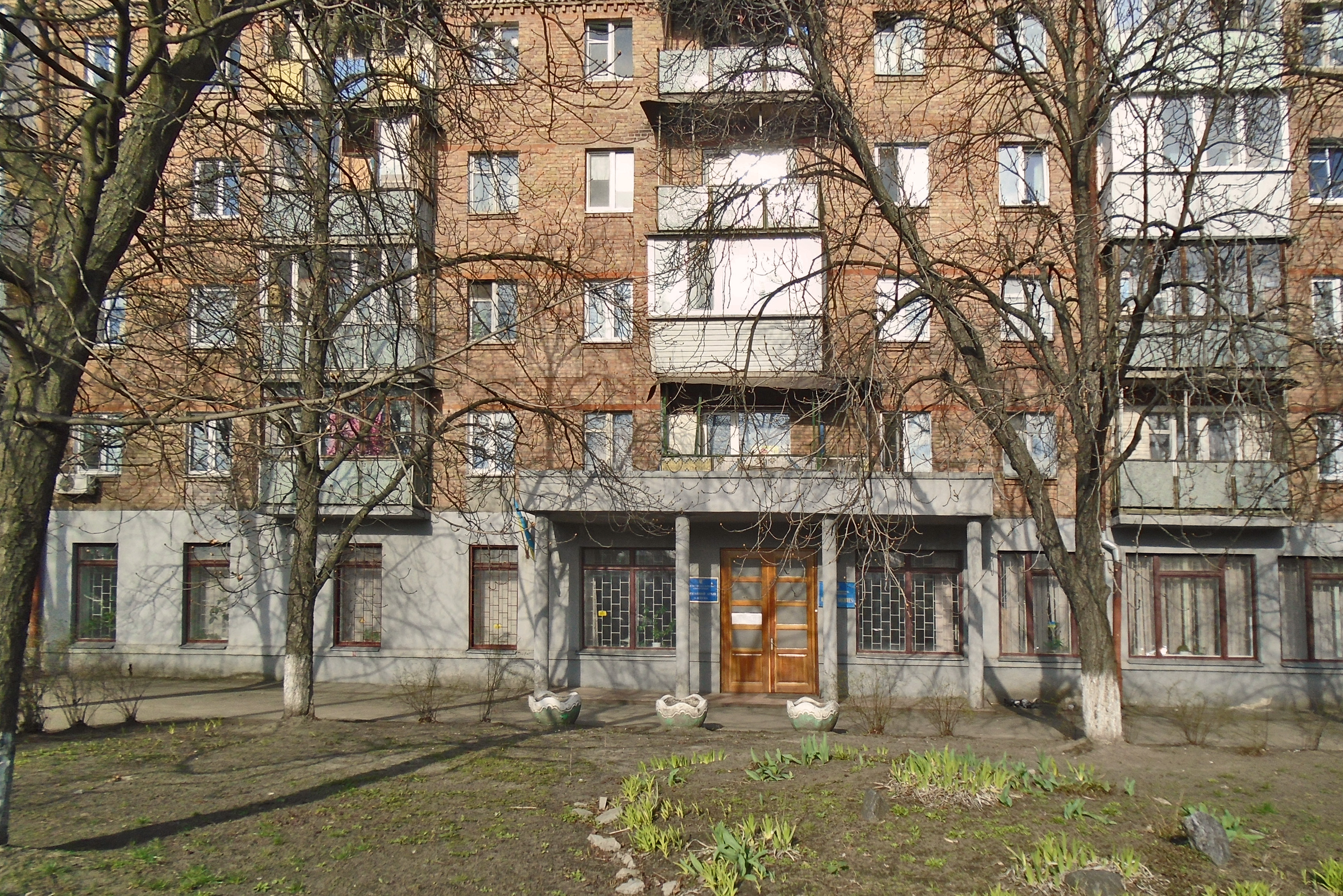
- The Kyiv Archives entrance in March 2017
- Interactive map of Державний архів міста Києва (ДАК); State Archives of the City of Kyiv
- 50°28′30″N 30°26′52″E
- Alternative name: Kyiv Archives
- Location: 04060, Olena Teliha street 23; Volodymyr Salsky street 33а, Kyiv, Ukraine
- Established: 1932
- Director: Oleksandr Panchenko (since 2018)
- Collection size: 337 fonds from the pre-1917 period, 1,233 fonds from the Soviet period, 30 from the period of Ukraine’s independence, 36 of personal origin
- Period covered: 17th century–present
- Website: archive.kyivcity.gov.ua

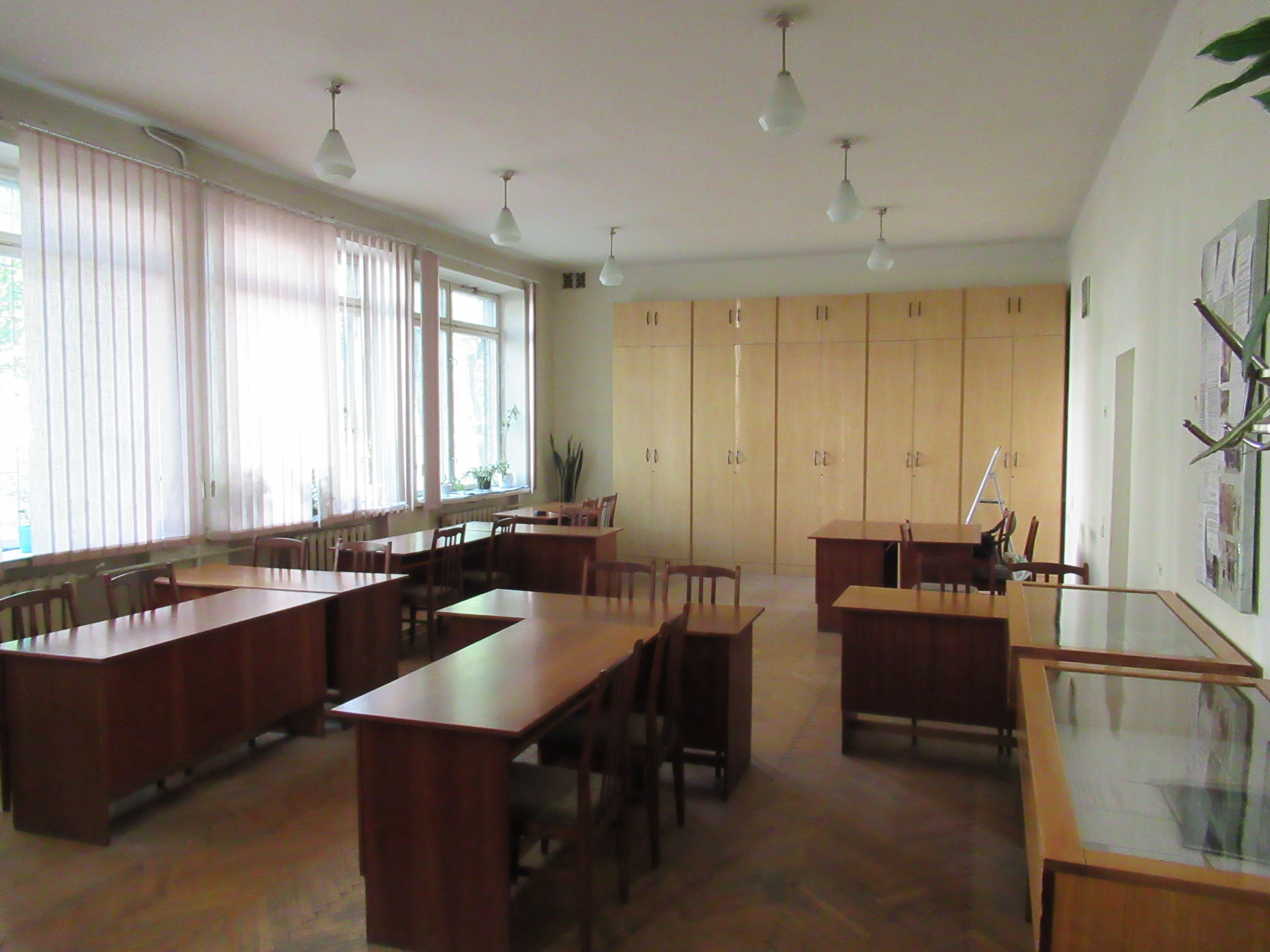
Archive reading room

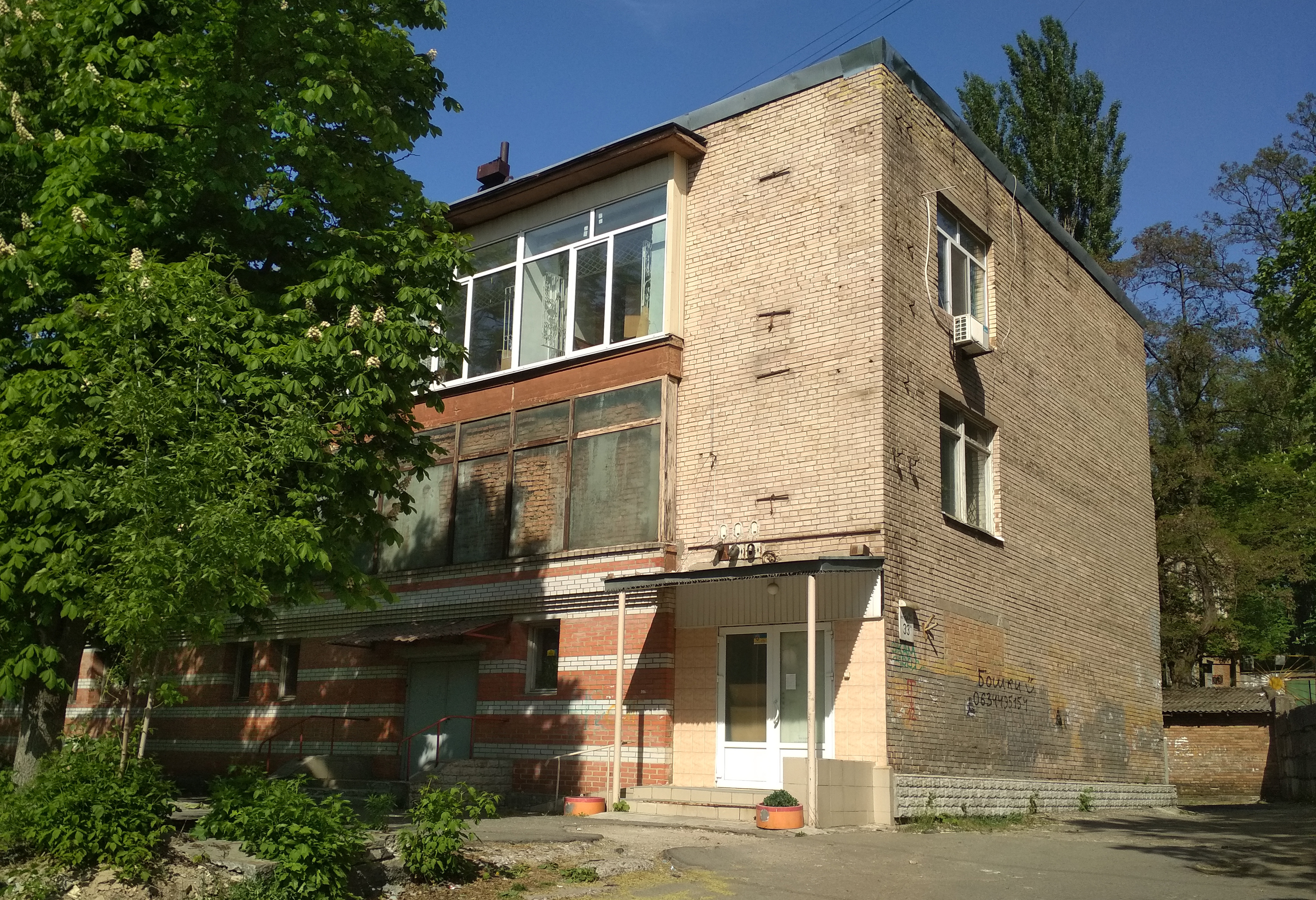
The building at Volodymyr Salsky street 33a

The State Archives of the City of Kyiv (Ukrainian: Державний архів міста Києва (ДАК) is a regional state archive institution responsible for the acquisition, cataloguing and preservation of documents relating to the history of Kyiv from the 17th century to the present day (see also History of Kyiv (1657–1811) and History of Kyiv (1811–1917)).

== History ==
The State Archives of the City of Kyiv is a structural unit of the Kyiv City State Administration, accountable to and under the supervision of the Kyiv City Council and reporting to the mayor of Kyiv, and, in matters relating to the exercise of state executive powers, to the State Archival Service of Ukraine.

In May 1932, the Kyiv City Archive began operations. In 1958, the archive was granted the status of the Kyiv City State Archive with a variable collection of documents. From 1962, it became the Kyiv City State Archive with a permanent collection of documents. In 1980, the archive was renamed the State Archive of the City of Kyiv.

Three distinct periods can be identified in the history of the DAK’s formation. The first phase — the 1960s and 1970s — was characterised by the fact that the leadership was part of the communist party apparatus, and was therefore assigned supervisory and ideological functions. The State Archival Commission’s activities were focused on preserving documents within its area of responsibility. The second phase — the 1980s — was characterised by closer cooperation with the city’s executive authorities. The third stage (from 1990 onwards) — operations in independent Ukraine within the framework of new legislation and new socio-political conditions. Thus, the adoption of the Law of Ukraine ‘On the National Archival Fund and Archival Institutions’ (1993) led to the drafting of the Regulations on the State Archive of the City of Kyiv, as well as documents governing the archive’s activities, and so on.

The systematic acquisition of the archive began in 1962, when the right to preserve documents with a permanent retention period was granted. During the existence of the USSR, command-and-control methods were characteristic of the management of the acquisition process. Following independence, the acquisition of the archive required solutions to new challenges relating to the appraisal of the value of new types of documents, as the regulatory framework was no longer up to date, whilst the sources of acquisition were expanding — a process was underway to establish new state, cooperative, public and industrial structures, as well as inter-sectoral and joint-stock associations.

The oldest documents in the archive are held in the collections of the Kyiv City Magistrate, the City Duma and the City Council: copies of charters and decrees issued by Russian tsars, Polish kings and hetmans of the Zaporizhian Host granting and confirming rights and privileges to the city of Kyiv and its inhabitants (1645–1764), decrees of the Senate; circulars from the Governors-General of Kyiv, Podillia (Podolia) and Volyn (Volhynia), and from the governors of Kyiv; minutes of meetings and decisions of the magistrate; registers of decisions by the City Council and the City Administration; and records relating to magistrate and City Council elections.

The vast majority of the documents date from the period after 1917, including documents of local executive authorities and local government bodies, and records from factories such as Arsenal and Aviant. A separate group consists of the archives of the electoral commissions for the elections of the president of Ukraine, members of the Verkhovna Rada of Ukraine and the mayor of Kyiv.

== Archive structure ==
The following units operate within the archive's structure:

- Department for the development of the National Archival Fund of Ukraine and records keeping
- Department for the preservation of documents, record keeping and reference services
- Information and records keeping department
- Finance and economics department
- Business support sector
- Information technology sector
- Classified information sector
- Document restoration department
- Logistics and facilities management department
- Human resources department

== Fonds ==
According to guidebooks published by the archive, as of 2007, the archive held:

- 337 fonds from the period prior to 1917
- 1,233 fonds from the Soviet period
- 30 fonds from the period of Ukraine’s independence
- 36 fonds of a personal nature

== Directors ==
- 1983—2002: Boris Panteleimonovich Kurinnyi
- 2018– : Oleksandr Panchenko

== Sources ==
- Boryak, Hennadiy Volodymyrovych; Matyash, Iryna Borysivna; Papakin, Heorhiy Volodymyrovych, eds. (2005). Архівні установи України: Довідник. Т.1. Державні архіви. Arkhivni ustanovy Ukraïny. Tom 1: Derz︠h︡avni arkhivy [Archival institutions in Ukraine: A Handbook. Volume 1: State Archives] (PDF) (in Ukrainian). Kyiv: State Archive Committee of Ukraine. pp. 520–526. ISBN 978-966-625-029-5.
- Державний архів міста Києва: Путівник. Том 1. Фонди дорадянського періоду [Kyiv City State Archives: A Guide. Volume 1. Collections from the pre-Soviet period.] (PDF) (in Ukrainian). Kyiv: State Archive Committee of Ukraine. 2007. p. 128. ISBN 978-966-96940-1-0. Archived (PDF) from the original on 14 March 2022.
- Анотований реєстр описів. Т. 2 [An annotated register of descriptions. Volume 2] (PDF) (in Ukrainian). Kyiv: State Archive Committee of Ukraine. 2007. p. 406. ISBN 978-966-96940-2-7. Archived (PDF) from the original on 20 April 2019.
- Kupchenko, Vira Petrivna (2004). Науково-методичні засади комплектування державного архіву (на прикладі Державного архіву м. Києва): автореферат дисертації на здобуття наукового ступеня кандидата історичних наук [Scientific and Methodological Principles of Collection Development in State Archives (using the State Archive of Kyiv as an example): abstract of a thesis for the degree of Candidate of Historical Sciences.] (Thesis) (in Ukrainian). Kyiv: Ukrainian Research Institute of Archival Affairs and Records Keeping. p. 15.
