= Oleksiy Kucherenko =

Ukrainian politician

- Олексій Кучеренко
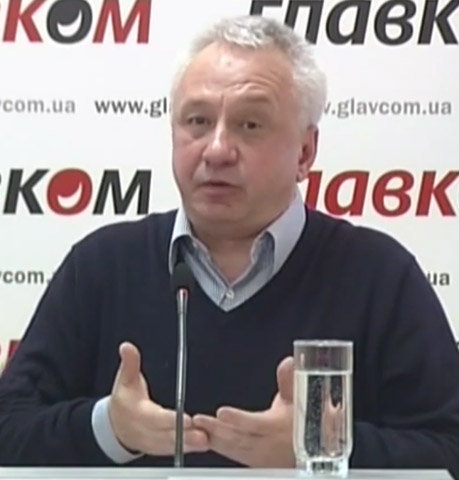
- Kucherenko in 2014

Minister of Housing and Communal Services
- In office December 18, 2007 – March 11, 2010
- President: Viktor Yushchenko
- Prime Minister: Yulia Tymoshenko
- Preceded by: Oleksandr Popov
- Succeeded by: Oleksandr Popov

Governor of Zaporizhzhia Oblast
- In office June 14, 2000 – March 19, 2001
- President: Leonid Kuchma
- Preceded by: Volodymyr Kuratchenko
- Succeeded by: Serhiy Sazonov (acting)

Personal details
- Born: April 3, 1961 (age 65) Vinnytsia, Ukrainian SSR, Soviet Union (now Ukraine)
- Party: Batkivshchyna
- Other political affiliations: Our Ukraine
- Education: Kyiv University; National Academy for Public Administration under the President of Ukraine
- Occupation: politician

Oleksiy Yuriyovych Kucherenko (Ukrainian: Олексій Юрійович Кучеренко; born April 3, 1961) is a Ukrainian politician. He was Minister of Housing and Communal Services from 2007 to 2010. Kucherenko previously served as Governor of Zaporizhzhia Oblast from 2000 to 2001.

== Biography ==
Kucherenko was a Member of Ukrainian parliament (Verkhovna Rada) of III (he won a seat in constituency number 80 located in Zaporizhia Oblast as a self-nominated candidate), V (as a candidate of the Our Ukraine Bloc), VI convocation (as a candidate for the Our Ukraine–People's Self-Defense Bloc). The following election, the 2014 Ukrainian parliamentary election, Kucherenko failed as a candidate for the Petro Poroshenko Bloc to win a parliamentary seat in constituency 216 located in Kyiv, he lost by a small margin of 100 votes. In the 2019 Ukrainian parliamentary election he returned to parliament for Batkivshchyna.

He is a Candidate of Sciences (PhD) in sociological sciences.

Kucherenko was the candidate of Batkivshchyna for the post of Mayor of Kyiv in the 2020 Kyiv local election set for October 25, 2020. In the election he received 45,823 votes, securing fourth place but losing the election to incumbent Mayor Vitali Klitschko who was re-elected in the first round of the election with 50.52% of the votes, 365,161 people had voted for him.

Political offices
| Preceded by Volodymyr Kuratchenko | Governor of Zaporizhzhia Oblast; 2000–2001 | Succeeded by Serhiy Sazonov (acting) |

Political offices
| Preceded by Oleksandr Popov | Minister of Housing and Communal Services of Ukraine; 2007–2010 | Succeeded by Oleksandr Popov |
