= Kyiv City State Administration =

Kyiv City State Administration Київська міська державна адміністрація
- City with special status
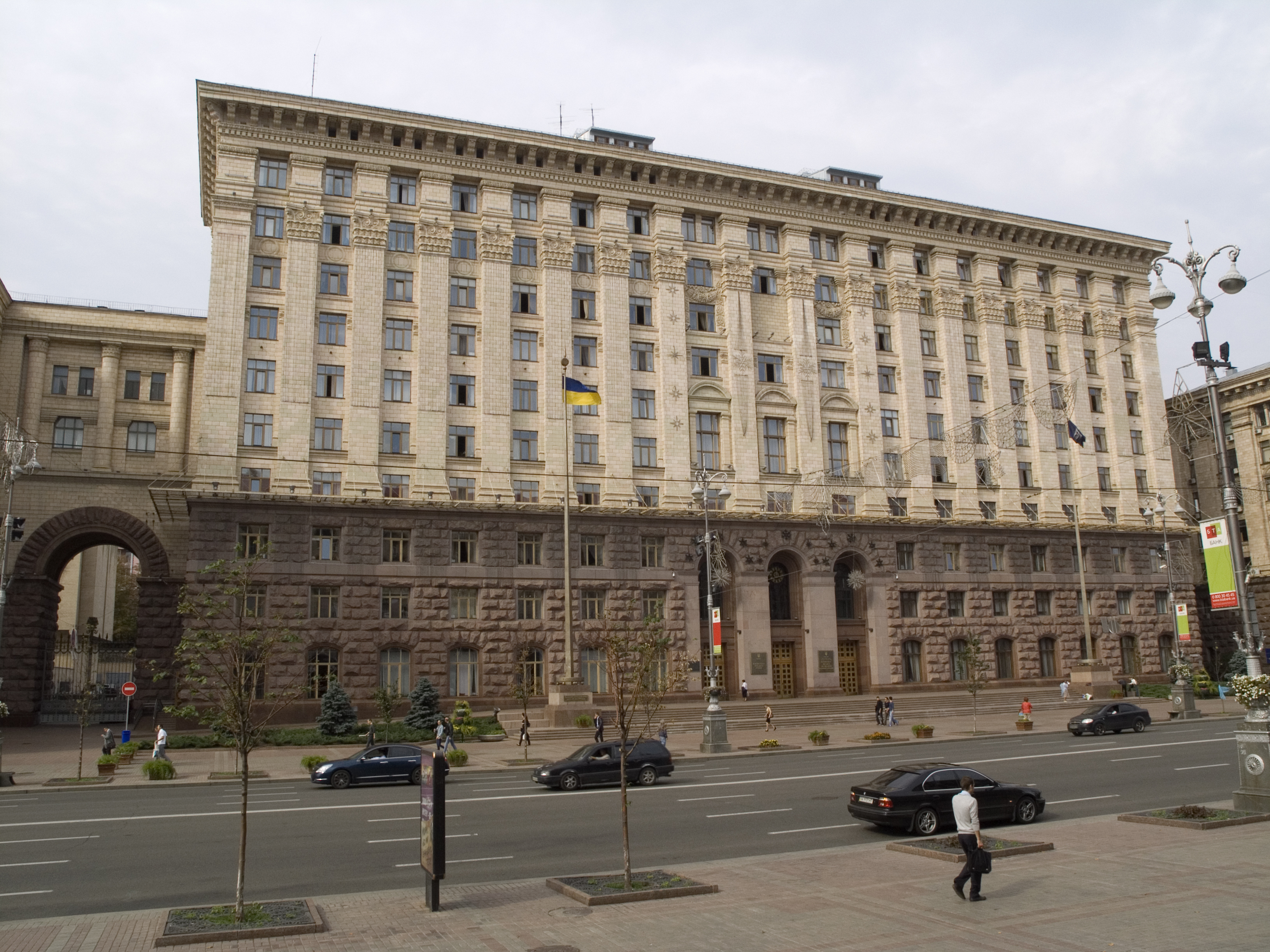
- Building of Kyiv city government in Khreshchatyk Street

- Coat of arms

Government
  - Head: Vacant since 16 July 2026; 2 months ago
- Administration center: 36 Khreshchatyk street, Kyiv, Ukraine
- Website: https://kyivcity.gov.ua/

Kyiv City State Administration (Ukrainian: Київська міська державна адміністрація, romanized: Kyivska miska derzhavna administratsiia, commonly abbreviated as KMDA Ukrainian: КМДА) is the national-level branch of the Government of Ukraine that administers Kyiv, the capital of Ukraine. Since the beginning Russian invasion of Ukraine in 2022, the institution has been transformed into the Kyiv City Military Administration (Ukrainian: Київська Міська Військова Адміністрація, romanized: Kyivska Miska Viiskova Administratsiia, abbreviated as KMVA (Ukrainian: КМВА), with Mayor of Kyiv mayor Vitali Klitschko, who had previously served as its head, being replaced with direct presidential appointees.

== Special status ==
Kyiv is a "city with special status" (Ukrainian: місто зі спеціальним статусом, romanized: misto zi spetsialnym statusom) within Ukraine compared to the other administrative subdivisions of the country — the most significant difference is that the city is subordinated directly to the national-level branches of the Government of Ukraine, skipping the regional level authorities of Kyiv Oblast. Its special administrative status is recognized in the Ukrainian Constitution in Chapter IX: Territorial Structure of Ukraine and the Law on the local state administration and is governed in accordance with laws passed by Ukraine's parliament, the Verkhovna Rada.

Local government is carried out by Kyiv City Council and district councils, headed by their chairpersons who are elected from among the councilors.

Although Kyiv is Ukraine's capital, the city also serves as the administrative center for Kyiv Oblast (province). The oblast entirely surrounds the city, making it into an enclave. In addition, until 2020 Kyiv also served as the administrative center for the oblast's Kyiv-Sviatoshyn Raion (district).

According to the Constitution, the head of the Kyiv City State Administration should resign after a new President is elected.

=== 2010 amendments ===
The Ukrainian parliament amended the law on "The capital of Ukraine – hero city of Kyiv" on September 7, 2010, making it possible for the President to appoint the (chairman) Head of Kyiv City Administration at his discretion. Before these amendments, the elected mayor of the Kyiv City Council was automatically appointed also as head of the Kyiv City State Administration. A Presidential decree relieved (then) Mayor of Kyiv Leonid Chernovetsky of the office of "Head of the Kyiv State Administration", while still preserving the post of mayor. This led to Chernovetsky being deprived of any official decision-making role and most power in the capital was handed over to the Head of Kyiv City Administration.

Oleksandr Popov was then appointed as Head of Kyiv City Administration by President Viktor Yanukovych on 16 November 2010. On 14 December 2013 President Yanukovych suspended Popov. The same day the General Prosecutor of Ukraine's Office handed "a notification on suspicion of abuse of power when ordering the Euromaidan police actions of 30 November 2013" out to Popov and Anatoliy Holubchenko was appointed as acting Head of Kyiv City Administration. On 24 December 2013 Holubchenko stated that he regularly met with (his predecessor) Popov. Volodymyr Makeyenko was appointed Head of Kyiv City Administration on 25 January 2014 by President Yanukovych. The same day Popov was fired as Head of Kyiv City Administration. Acting President Oleksandr Turchynov dismissed Makeyenko from the post of the head of Kyiv City State Administration on 7 March 2014 and gave the post to Volodymyr Bondarenko On 25 June 2014 the newly elected President Petro Poroshenko appointed Vitali Klitschko, the Mayor of Kyiv since 5 June 2014, as head of the administration.

=== Russo-Ukrainian War (since 2022) ===
With the start of the 2022 Russian invasion of Ukraine, Kyiv City State Administration was superseded by the Kyiv City Military Administration, which serves as a temporary body of city government functioning during wartime. On 1 March 2022 President Volodymyr Zelenskyy appointed professional military officer Mykola Zhyrnov as its head. On 21 October Zhyrnov was replaced by presidential decree with Serhiy Popko On 31 December 2024 Tymur Tkachenko was appointed new head of Kyiv City State Administration by President Zelenskyy and serving on that post until his dismissal in July 2026.

On 23 August 2025 head of KMVA issued a decree, according to which all demonstrations and mass events in Kyiv have to receive a prior permission from the General Staff of the Ukrainian Armed Forces, with their organizers having to inform the administration on the existence of such permission. Some media have connected this measure with the recent anti-corruption protests, which had taken place in the capital.

== List of heads ==
- 1990–1991 Hryhoriy Malyshevsky (from Boryspil Raion) (as head of city executive committee, simultaneously city's mayor)
  - 1991–1992 Oleksandr Mosiyuk (from Lutsk) (as acting head of city executive committee, simultaneously acting city's mayor)
- March 1992 Ivan Dankevych (from Bobrovytsia Raion) (as head of city executive committee)
- March 1992–April 1993 Ivan Saliy (from Ichnia Raion) (as Presidential representative and city's governor)
  - April 1993 Ivan Dankevych (from Bobrovytsia Raion) (as acting)
- April 1993–July 1994 Leonid Kosakivsky (from Mohyliv-Podilskyi Raion) (as Presidential representative)
- July 1995–July 1996 Leonid Kosakivsky (from Mohyliv-Podilskyi Raion) (as Head of Kyiv City Administration) (mayor in 1994–1998)
- August 1996–April 2006 Oleksandr Omelchenko (from Lypovets Raion) (as Head of Kyiv City Administration) (mayor in 1999–2006)
- April 2006–November 2010 Leonid Chernovetskyi (from Kharkiv) (as Head of Kyiv City Administration) (mayor in 2006–2012)
- November 2010–December 2013 Oleksandr Popov (from Kryvyi Rih) (as Head of Kyiv City Administration)
  - December 2013–January 2014 Anatoliy Holubchenko (from Mariupol) (acting)
- January 25, 2014 – March 7, 2014 Volodymyr Makeyenko (from Klintsy, Russia) (as Head of Kyiv City Administration)
- March 7, 2014 – June 25, 2014 Volodymyr Bondarenko
- June 25, 2014 - March 1, 2022 Vitali Klitschko (mayor in 2014–present)
- March 1, 2022 - October 21, 2022 Mykola Zhyrnov (head of Kyiv City Military Administration)
- October 21, 2022 - December 31, 2024 Serhiy Popko (head of Kyiv City Military Administration)
- December 31, 2024 - July 16, 2026 Tymur Tkachenko (head of Kyiv City Military Administration)
- Since July 16, 2026 Andrii Tkachov (acting head of Kyiv City Military Administration)

== See also ==
- Subdivisions of Kyiv
- State Archives of the City of Kyiv
