= Oleksandr Popov =

Ukrainian politician

- Олександр Попов
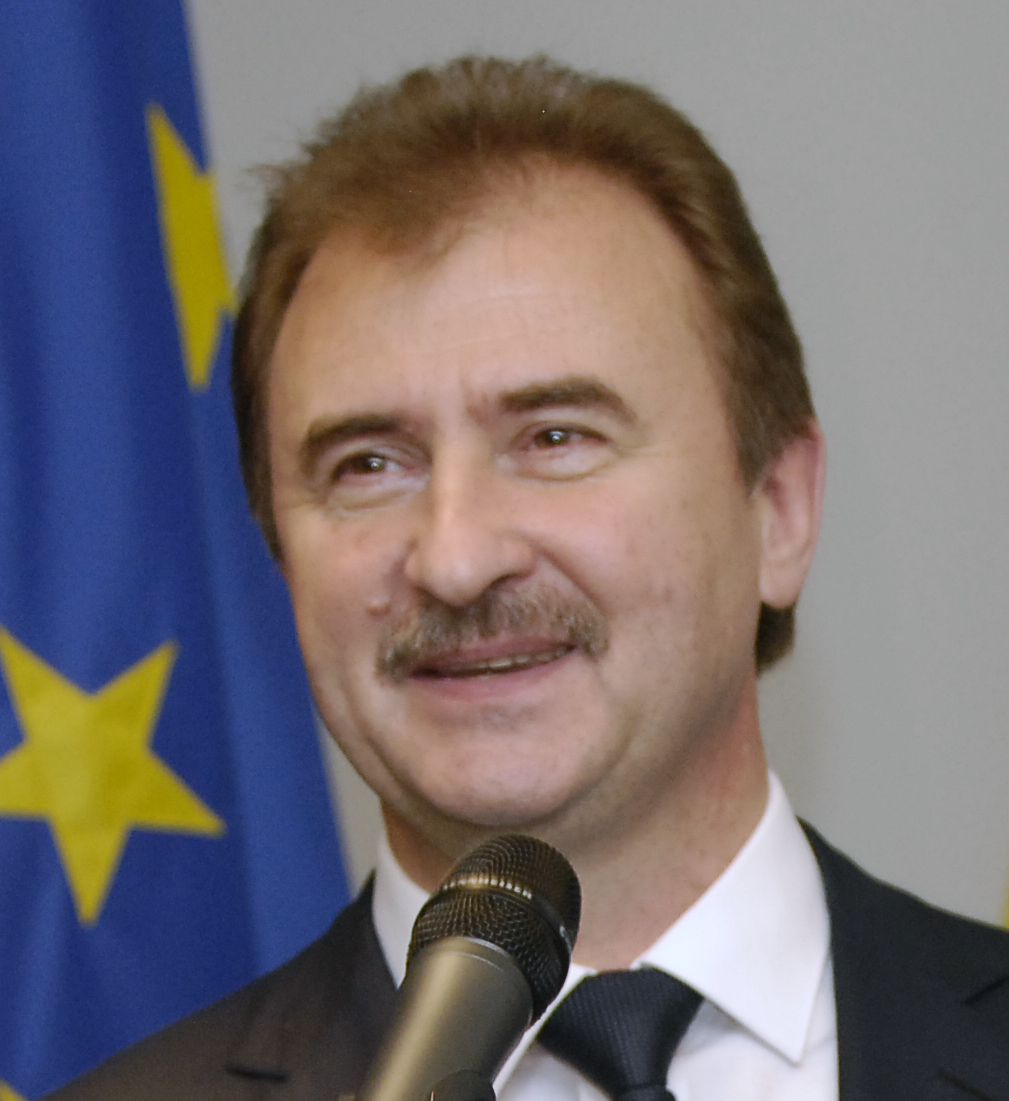
- Popov in 2012

Head of the Kyiv City State Administration
- In office 16 November 2010 – 14 December 2013
- Preceded by: Leonid Chernovetskyi
- Succeeded by: Anatoliy Holubchenko (acting)

Minister of Housing and Communal Services
- In office 11 March 2010 – 17 June 2010
- Preceded by: Oleksiy Kucherenko
- Succeeded by: Yuriy Khivrych

Minister of Housing and Communal Services
- In office 21 March 2007 – 18 December 2007
- Preceded by: (post created)
- Succeeded by: Oleksiy Kucherenko

Mayor of Komsomolsk
- In office 1994–2007
- Preceded by: (post created)
- Succeeded by: Serhiy Suprun

Personal details
- Born: Oleksandr Pavlovych Popov; 22 November 1960 (age 65) Kryvyi Rih, Ukrainian SSR, Soviet Union
- Party: Party of Regions, Opposition Platform — For Life
- Education: Tyumen Civil Engineering Institute
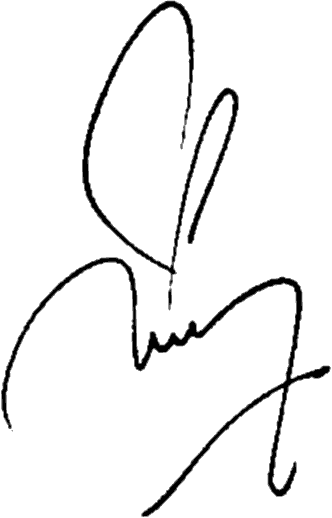
- Signature

Oleksandr Pavlovych Popov (Ukrainian: Олександр Павлович Попов; born 22 November 1960) is a Ukrainian politician, businessman, former head of the Kyiv City State Administration.

== Biography ==
He graduated Tyumen Civil Engineering Institute and Higher School of the KGB in Kyiv.

From 1982 to 1984, he served in the Soviet Army. From 1984 to 1986, he worked as a foreman of the Kremenchugrudstroy trust. In 1987 he was a foreman of the repair and construction department of Poltava GOK.

In 1987–1991, he served in a KGB unit of Support for the economy. Until 1993, he served in Security Service of Ukraine. Has is ranked reserve lieutenant colonel.

In 1993–1994, he was the head of the marketing department, vice-president for marketing and economics of construction concern Inkomstroy. In 1994 Oleksandr Popov won the election of the mayor of Komsomolsk (in 2016, the town was renamed Horishni Plavni) of the Poltava region. He stayed in this position until 2007.

In 1995–2006, he was deputy chairman of the board, Head of the Association of Cities in Poltava Region. In 1998–2000, he was a member of the Coordination Council on Local Self-Government Issues under President Leonid Kuchma. In 2007, he headed the Ministry of Housing and Utilities in the government of Mykola Azarov, and held this position for seven months. In the Verkhovna Rada of the 6th convocation, from December 2007 to March 2010, he was People's Deputy from the Party of Regions. He passed through the list of the party at number 97.

Traditionally, the elected mayor of Kyiv also automatically became chair of Kyiv City Council and head of the city's state administration (i.e. head of government). However, following dispute between the mayor and the president in 2010, President Viktor Yanukovych asked the parliament to give him the power to appoint the head of the state administration. Parliament acquiesced, and mayor Leonid Chernovetskyi was dismissed from the state administration and replaced with presidential appointee Popov. Though Chernovetskyi remained the mayor, effective power then started to rests with the appointee Popov, not mayor Chernovetskyi. Kyiv then did not have an elected mayor until mayor Vitali Klitschko was sworn in on 5 June 2014. (Note: Chernovetskyi tendered his resignation on 1 June 2012. The City Council decided the same day that Halyna Hereha would temporarily act as the mayor of Kyiv.)

Among his merits as the head of the Kyiv City State Administration, Popov listed the opening of five new metro stations, two museums and one library, the construction of road junctions, the launch of a city train, the repair of five schools and 30 kindergartens.

On 14 December 2013 President Viktor Yanukovych suspended Popov. The same day the General Prosecutor of Ukraine's Office handed "a notification on suspicion of abuse of power when ordering the Euromaidan police actions of 30 November 2013" out to Popov and Anatoliy Holubchenko was appointed as acting Head of Kyiv City Administration.

The trial against Popov is ongoing since late 2013. In it Popov denies any wrongdoing. Since the trial he has started an export company aimed at EU markets.

In the 2019 Ukrainian parliamentary election Popov was a self-nominated candidate in Kyiv's electoral constituency 212 (located in Darnytskyi District). In the election Popov was not elected to parliament since he gained fourth place with 9.52% of the votes (the constituency was won by Maksym Perebyinis of the Servant of the People party with 34.43%).

In the 2020 Kyiv local election (set for 25 October 2020) Popov was a candidate for Mayor of Kyiv nominated by Opposition Platform — For Life. In the election he received 68,757 votes, securing second place but losing the election to incumbent Mayor Vitali Klitschko who was re-elected in the first round of the election with 50.52% of the votes, 365,161 people had voted for him.

== Wealth ==
According to the 2012 declaration, Olexandr Popov owns two apartments (71 and 43 sq.m.). His family members have an apartment in Kyiv (86 sq.m.) and a land plot (529 sq.m.).

In the declaration, he also mentioned a Lexus ES car (2007) and a bank account with UAH 168,000.

The firm Ofer.Ua actively participates in tenders. One of the latest tenders it won was in August 2020. Popov will supply heat energy to the surgical and children's buildings of the intensive care hospital in Horishni Plavni.

== Awards ==
- Order of Prince Yaroslav the Wise, 5th Class (2012)
- Order of Merit, 1st Class (2011), 2nd Class (2006), 3rd Class (2001)

== Notes ==
Political offices
Preceded by Leonid Chernovetskyi	Head of the Kyiv City State Administration; 2013–2014	Succeeded by Anatoliy Holubchenko (acting)
