= Pravex Bank =

- Type: Public joint-stock company
- Industry: banking
- Founded: 1992
- Headquarters: Kyiv, Ukraine
- Key people: Silvio Pedrazzi, Chairman of the Supervisory Board. Sergii Naumov, Chairman of the Management Board
- Owner: Intesa Sanpaolo
- Website: www.pravex.com.ua

Intesa Sanpaolo Bank (formerly Pravex Bank) is a private commercial bank based in Kyiv. It is currently part of the Intesa Sanpaolo group.

The bank was first started in 1992. It was sold for 504 million euros to Intesa by the former Mayor of Kyiv, Leonid Chernovetsky. In January 2014, the bank was acquired by CentraGas Holding GmbH, a subsidiary of Group DF, for a price of 74 million euros. However, by 2017, it had already been bought back by Intesa. In 2021, the European Investment Bank started helping the bank finance Ukrainian enterprises following the COVID-19 pandemic. After the start of the Russian invasion of Ukraine, the bank stayed open, primarily in its locations in western Ukraine, with Intesa confirming it would help the bank during the war.

== History ==
The bank was first registered by the National Bank of Ukraine in December 1992. In February 2008, it was agreed to that 100% of its shares would be sold to the Intesa Sanpaolo group for $750 million (504 million euros). The owner prior to this was the family of the former Mayor of Kyiv, Leonid Chernovetsky. Shortly thereafter, the Anti-Monopoly Committee of Ukraine granted permission for the acquisition. However, just a few years later in January 2014 Intesa sold the bank to CentraGas Holding GmbH, which is held by Group DF under Dmytro Firtash. It was sold for only 74 million euros, which was much less than the initial 2008 sale of 504 million euros. This occurred during a time of lots of foreign banks exiting Ukraine. However, it was confirmed by 2017 that Intesa had eventually bought the bank back, and it was operating as part of their network again. In November 2017, the bank updated its logo and style to align with Intesa.

In March 2021, the European Investment Bank signed a 30 million euros credit line agreement with the bank to support Ukrainian enterprises effected by the COVID-19 pandemic. This was part of the economic recovery program in EU Eastern Neighbourhood countries. Following the start of the Russian invasion of Ukraine, the bank continued to operate, but fluctuated between closing and opening some branches due to safety reasons. They primarily kept their banks open in western Ukraine. Intesa later released a statement confirming that it would support the bank through the war and that they were helping with foreign exchange services due to the large amounts of people displaced into western Ukraine. In 2023, the bank was identified as one of five that needed to increase capital levels due to the National Bank of Ukraine's stability assessment. In April 2024, Intesa did so by recapitalising the bank by 1.1 billion hryvnias. The bank was also required to ensure capital adequacy by the end of September 2024 and by the end of March 2026, following two stages.

== Interesting facts ==
- Former lawyer of this bank Iryna Mudra became later Deputy Minister of Justice of Ukraine.

== See also ==
- List of banks in Ukraine
