= Serhiy Popko =

Ukrainian military general (born 1961)

Serhiy Mikolayovych Popko
- Сергі́й Микола́йович Попко́
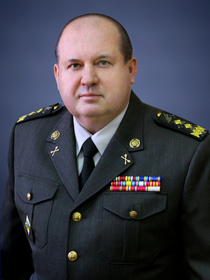
- Born: 13 February 1961 (age 65); Kiev, Ukrainian SSR, Soviet Union (now Kyiv, Ukraine)
- Alma mater: Kyiv Higher Combined Arms Command School
- Military career
- Allegiance: Soviet Union; Ukraine
- Service years: 1978—2020
- Rank: Colonel general
- Commands: Commander of the Ukrainian Ground Forces the Chief position of the Kyiv City Military Administration

Serhiy Mikolayovych Popko (Ukrainian: Сергі́й Микола́йович Попко́, born 13 February 1961 in Kyiv) is a Ukrainian military general. He served as Chief of the Kyiv City Military Administration from 2022 to 2024. Prior to that, he was Commander of the Ukrainian Ground Forces from 2016 to 2019.

== Early career ==
Born on February 13, 1961 in Kiev, which was then part of the Ukrainian SSR in the Soviet Union. He is a graduate of the Kyiv Higher Combined Arms Command School. For some time, he was part of the Ukrainian peacekeeping mission in Iraq. From September 2011 to July 2012 he served as Commander of the 13th Army Corps, which was stationed in the city of Rivne. On 24 August 2012 he was promoted to the rank of lieutenant general. After 2012, he served as Head of the Main Command Center of the General Staff of the Armed Forces of Ukraine and as acting commander of the Ukrainian Anti-Terrorist Operation, both positions of which he did until 2016. He was the commander of the Ukrainian Ground Forces (2016-2019).

In 2017, he was promoted to colonel general. From August 2019 to May 2020 Popko was Chief Inspector of the Ministry of Defense. On 7 May 2020 he was released into the reserves.

== Kyiv Military Administration ==
On 21 October 2022, President Volodymyr Zelenskyy appointed Popko Chief of the Kyiv City Military Administration. Popko’s tenure was accompanied with the Russian armed forces targeting Kyiv with missile attacks. In December 2023, Ukrainian NGO Chesno stated that there was no clear demarcation of city management duties between Popko and Kyiv Mayor Vitali Klitschko. They both co-chair the Kyiv Defense Council.

On 31 December 2024, Popko was dismissed from the Chief position of the Kyiv City Military Administration.

== See also ==
- Ukrainian Anti-Terrorist Operation
- Ukrainian Ground Forces
