= Leonid Chernovetskyi =

Ukrainian politician

- Леонід Черновецький
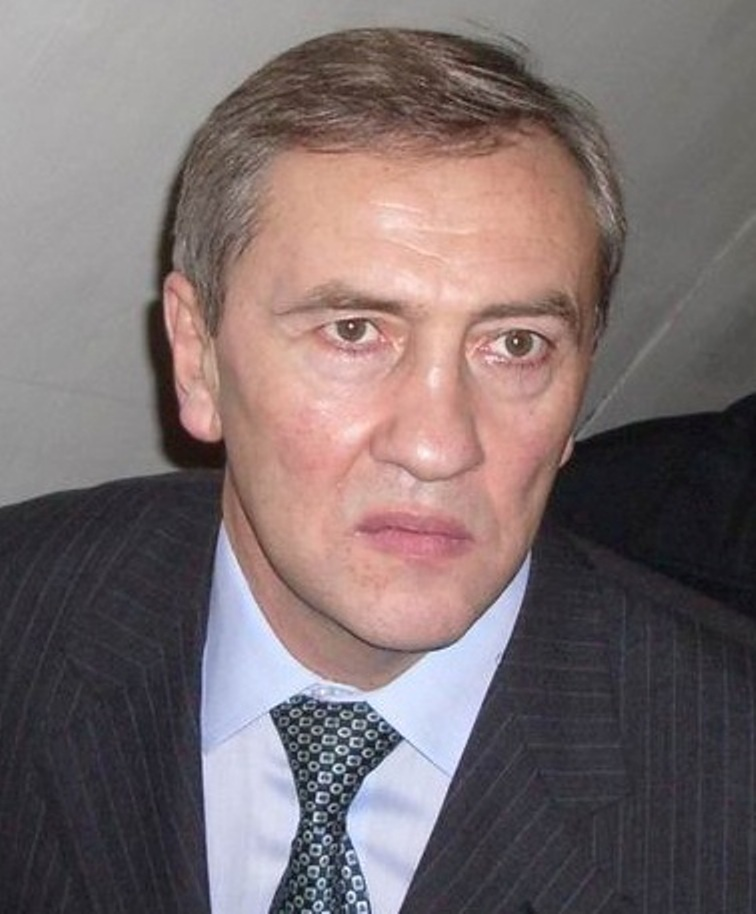
- Chernovetskyi in 2006

4th Mayor of Kyiv
- In office 14 April 2006 – 3 June 2012
- Preceded by: Oleksandr Omelchenko
- Succeeded by: Halyna Hereha

Head of the Kyiv City State Administration
- In office 20 April 2006 – 16 November 2010
- Preceded by: Oleksandr Omelchenko
- Succeeded by: Oleksandr Popov

Personal details
- Born: 25 November 1951 (age 74) Kharkiv, Kharkiv Oblast, Ukrainian SSR, USSR
- Party: Christian Liberal Party of Ukraine
- Spouse(s): Alina Aivazova (divorce); Elena Savchuk
- Children: 3, including Stepan
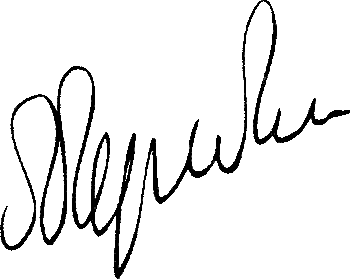
- Signature
- Website: www.chernovetskiy.com.ua/

Leonid Mykhaylovych Chernovetskyi (Ukrainian: Леонід Михайлович Черновецький; born 25 November 1951) is a Ukrainian politician and former entrepreneur, who was Mayor of Kyiv from 2006 to 2012. He was a successful businessman, founder and controlling stakeholder of the Pravex Group and Pravex Bank, one of the largest banks in Ukraine. Since the appointment of Oleksandr Popov by President Viktor Yanukovych as Head of Kyiv City State Administration on 16 November 2010, Chernovetskyi was deprived of any real decision-making role in Kyiv. He tendered his resignation on 1 June 2012.

After this resignation Chernovetsky and his family moved to the Georgian town Kobuleti and he received Georgian citizenship.

== Early life ==
Chernovetskyi quit school when he was 14 and went to work as a fitter at an aviation factory, but soon returned to resume his education, graduating from the Kharkiv public school #4. From 1970 until 1972, Chernovetsky served his military obligations. In 1977, he graduated from the Kharkiv Law School with specialization in jurisprudence. He worked as the senior detective in the prosecutor's office of Kyiv Oblast. In 1981, he returned to Kharkiv Law School attending aspirantura and obtained his doctorate in 1984 with a dissertation about Methods of investigation of plunders conducted by officials. Until 1989 he was a teacher at Kyiv University.

== Career ==
Soon after perestroika, he went into private business, becoming one of the earliest big businesspeople in Kyiv. He founded the Pravex Group (Ukrainian: Правекс, an abbreviated from "Law, Economics and Sociology"). Later the banking division of the Pravex Group rose into the Pravex Bank - one of the largest banks in Ukraine, possessing a dense network of offices in Kyiv and other regions. In 2001, Chernovetskyi and his bank founded the "Kyiv Bank Union" banking association. Pravex Bank was sold in 2008 to Banca Intesa São Paulo for 509 million euros. Chernovetskyi has acknowledged giving millions in bribes during his days as a businessman.

In 2012, Leonid Chernovetskyi founded the Chernovetskyi Investment Group, a venture capital group based in Kyiv. In 2015, the Chernovetskyi Investment Group made an investment of $1 million into Busfor, a Moscow-based online tour company.

On 18 August 2008 President Victor Yushchenko granted him the Order of Yaroslav the Wise, though it was harshly opposed by Prime Minister Yulia Tymoshenko who urged to "stop granting decorations to corruptionists".

Chernovetskyi is a member of the Embassy of God, an evangelical church founded by Nigerian immigrant Sunday Adelaja. He is also a longtime philanthropist of Kyiv, caring for the city's old and poor.

In January 2009 Chernovetskyi bought FC Arsenal Kyiv for 1 Hryvnia from Ukrainian businessman Vadim Rabinovich.

In February 2009 he released a compact disc with "popular songs of the 1980s" sung by him.

In 2009 he became the man of the year according to Korrespondent magazine.

On 2 January 2013 Leonid Chernovetskyi founded Chernovetskyi Investment Group, investment potential of which exceeds 750 million dollars.

He is currently Honorary President of Chernovetskyi Investment Group.

Chernovetskyi was nicknamed "Cosmos" (Ukrainian: Космос) after he publicly announced that he intends to fly in outer space with his cat. However, that name got stuck with him later due to his non-ordinary administrative and political decisions and announcements that have been viewed as "bizarre". He has sung at rallies and offered to auction off his kisses. That behavior prompted some officials to call for a medical examination into whether he is mentally healthy to govern the city. In response, Chernovetskyi posed, on 18 March 2009, in tight swimming trunks in front of scores of reporters to try to show he was both physically and mentally fit.

Chernovetskyi was the subject of several personal and political attacks when he took office as mayor of Kyiv. Some were critical about his lack of experience and his authoritarianism. Others considered him off-balance or speculated that he has drug or alcohol problems. However, none of these accusations have been proven to date.

== Controversies ==
Pravex Bank, one of the largest retail banks of Ukraine formerly controlled by Chernovetskyi and his family, was rumoured to submit its new employees to a polygraph test and to use coercive methods to recover impaired loans. However, the Bank came out to be one of the most profitable financial institutions in Ukraine despite strong competition from foreign-owned banks.

In 2003, Chernovetskyi made headlines for his links to the deaths of two pedestrians who had died on separate occasions after being run over at high speed by cars linked to Chernovetskyi on the road leading to his mansion in the elite Koncha-Zaspa residential neighborhood. Chernovetskyi, who is a collector of expensive souped-up automobiles, was behind the wheel in the second incident; his wife was a passenger in the first. Neither Chernovetskyi nor his driver has been found guilty of any wrongdoing in connection with the incidents.

On 16 February 2010 the Kyiv city administration denied reports that Chernovetskyi's daughter Khrystyna Chernovetska was robbed in France on 15 February 2010, after foreign media had reported that Chernovetska had €4.5 million worth of jewels stolen in Paris.

In April 2011, Interpol issued an international arrest warrant for Chernovetskyi's son-in-law Viacheslav Suprunenko, a member of the Kyiv city council's Chernovetskyi Bloc faction. According to Kyiv Post, he was arrested in Italy in May 2011.

Chernovetskyi's son, Stepan was arrested in Barcelona in July 2016 on charges of money laundering and fraud despite his father's denials and threats of legal action against Spanish authorities. Leonid Chernovetskyi released a statement on his Facebook page announcing the release of his son in August 2016.

== Political career ==
Chernovetskyi is the leader of the Christian Liberal Party of Ukraine. He joined the party in 1996 and was elected to the Ukrainian Parliament, the Verkhovna Rada, representing one of Kyiv's constituencies. He was reelected in 1998 and 2002. During his last term (2002–2006) he was a member of the Committee of National Budget and head of the Committee for Budget Control and Spending. He also was a member of the Our Ukraine fraction in Parliament. In 1998-1999 Chernovestkyi was a co-chair, and in 1999-2000 the chair of the "For Beautiful Ukraine" party. From 1997 to 2001 he was a member of the Economic Advisory Council to the President of Ukraine.

While being a member of Verkhovna Rada Leonid Chernovetskyi advocated for citizens in disputes with officials of Kyiv City State Administration. During this time his office helped thousands of Kyiv citizens. In some cases he personally sought positive resolutions.

In 2003, he introduced a bill in parliament "On the protection of public morals", which governs the state regulation on the circulation of information and media products which negatively affect public morality. The law also imposed prohibition on the production and circulation of pornographic materials.

2004 presidential elections

Chernovestkyi was a self-nominated candidate in the 2004 presidential election, believed to be one of the "technical candidates" whose actual purpose was to assist Viktor Yushchenko's struggle for the presidency by placing additional representatives in electoral commissions.

2006 parliamentary and mayor elections

According to the Kyiv city election commission, Chernovetskyi garnered 32 percent of the vote to win the election for mayor of Kyiv. Vitali Klitschko placed second with 24 percent and incumbent Oleksandr Omelchenko placed third with 21 percent. Opponents say Chernovetskyi won because of a dirty campaign marred by bribing impoverished elderly voters with food; Chernovetskyi has denied this. Chernovetskyi was also elected to the Verkhovna Rada in the list of the Our Ukraine Bloc, but had to reject the parliamentary seat.

In first year after the election victory Chernovetskyi increased Kyiv budget 5 times and developed anti-alcohol and anti-tobacco programs during his tenure as mayor.

2008 snap Kyiv local election and political unrest

Leonid Chernovetskyi won another term as Mayor of Kyiv with 38% of the vote in the 25 May 2008 snap local election, called by the Verkhovna Rada in March 2008.

Former deputy head of Leonid Chernovetskyi Bloc Alla Shlapak highlighted Chernovetskyi's support for aid programs for pensioners, teachers, medics and other groups. In 2010 he founded a charitable service “Social Patrol”, which was delivering warm clothes, food, medical assistance and advising to homeless people.

On 12 April 2012, in Georgia Chernovetskyi established a charitable fund called “Social partnership”. The main projects of Social Partnership fund are: “Home care” (providing medication and medical assistance to those who are in need); “Family-type orphanage”; “Large family support”; “Gathering of clothes” (system for gathering and distributing clothes for people in need); “Food collecting program” (gathering of food for poor people).

After his resignation from the post of mayor he continued to engage in charitable work. According to his own statement, the former mayor donates not less than 1 million dollars to charity per year. In September 2013, he opened an orphanage in Georgia.

Leonid Chernovetskyi has been known to organize contests to generate ideas to help resolve Ukrainian social and political crises, with cash prizes for winners.

Chernovetskyi did not participate in the 2014 Ukrainian parliamentary election.

In December 2015 Chernovetskyi made an announcement of his intention to enter the political arena in Georgia in an interview with a Georgian media outlet, stating, “I decided to go into politics because I want to spend the last days of my life here, in Georgia. Georgia is my destiny!”.

Following the Russian Invasion of Ukraine, on 25 February 2022 Chernovetskyi published a post on Facebook saying that Russia was only striking military targets and that Ukraine should recognise the borders of the Russian-backed Donetsk People's Republic and Luhansk People's Republic to end the war. He also urged Ukrainians not to take up arms and claimed the war had stemmed from Ukraine not implementing the Minsk Agreements. Following this, in June 2022, the Office of the Prosecutor General of Ukraine announced that Chernovetskyi would be charged under Article 110 for "encroachment on the territorial integrity of Ukraine" due to his social media posts. Chernovetskyi responded to the charges, saying that the accusation was a misunderstanding and that he supported a united Ukraine that was aligned with Europe and that the war was a crime by the Russian government. As of April 2025, the case still has not progressed, with no indictment being sent to court, and is now being handled by the Security Service of Ukraine (SBU) in its Kyiv office.

== Klychko - Chernovetsky stand-off ==
On 6 February 2009 the Vitaliy Klychko Bloc stated it will apply to the Verkhovna Rada, the Cabinet of Ministers, the National Security and Defense Council, and the Kyiv prosecutor's office with a request to take into consideration the unlawfulness of Kyiv Mayor Leonid Chernovetskyi's actions and to call early mayoral elections in the city. Earlier on 12 December 2008 Prime Minister Yulia Tymoshenko also hinted that new early mayoral elections should be held again in Kyiv. This was based on Tymoshenko's disapprove of the handling of Chernovetskyi of the local energy crises of December 2008 when the Kyivenergo utility company began cutting the supply of hot water to about 5,000 homes in Kyiv because of the Kyiv municipal administration's failure to compensate the company for the difference between the tariffs charged by Kyivenerho and the actual cost of its services, with Tymoshenko alleging that the difference was siphoned off to fund Chernovetskyi's election campaign.

In May 2008, preliminary results showed Leonid Chernovetsky as clear leader ahead of Aleksandr Turchinov, a member of Ukraine Prime Minister Yulia Timoshenko's Bloc and Vitaly Klychko.

Within a year, Chernovetskyi's popularity was waning among the residents of Kyiv. On 13 March 2009 a temporary committee of the Verkhovna Rada for investigating the Kyiv city state administration and the Kyiv city council came to the conclusion that it was necessary to examine the mental and physical state of Chernovetskyi, however, the procedure could be performed against his will only under a court ruling.

in May 2009, Klychko threatened to sue Chernovetskyi for claims he demanded two hectares of land on which to erect a boxing club. In 2011, the feud continued with Klychko alleging that Chernovetskyi was responsible for the theft of 70 billion hryvni. Chernovetskyi responded with intent to counter sue.

Yanukovych presidency

Chernovetskyi announced in March 2009 he would participate in the 2010 Ukrainian presidential election. But did not do so.

A March 2010 poll indicated that a large majority of Kyiv residents (more than 89%) were unhappy with his work and would like the mayor to resign without delays (80%). On 15 November 2010 President Viktor Yanukovych dismissed Leonid Chernovetskyi from the post of Head of the Kyiv's State Administration and appointed Oleksandr Popov to this post. Popov is seen as Chernovetskyi's replacement since he was not elected but appointed by President Viktor Yanukovich. The appointment was made possible by the Ukraine's national parliament which had amended the law on “the capital of Ukraine – hero city of Kyiv” on 7 September 2010, making it possible for the President to appoint the chairman of the city administration at his discretion (before the amendments the elected Kyiv mayor was automatically appointed head of the city administration). Another presidential decree relieved Chernovetskyi of the office "head of the Kyiv State Administration", while still preserving the post of Kyiv mayor.

Popov stated early 2011 "we've definitely limited the activity of the city council and the mayor to some extent". In November 2010 Prime Minister Mykola Azarov compared Chernovetskyi to the Queen of the United Kingdom, saying he had a title but no official decision-making role. The Azarov Government then opened several investigations into the allegedly illegal sale of city land and property by Chernovetskyi's top officials and then sales of those lands to friends and their companies. By then Chernovetskyi was not to be seen in Kyiv and rumors appeared he was in "quasi-retirement" in Switzerland, was seeking political asylum in Israel or that he had secretly tendered his resignation. In a pressconference on 28 January 2011 Prime Minister Azarov asked Popov “to find by all means” Chernovetskyi "to bring him back to the work". According to UNIAN Azarov "could not suppress a laugh" when asked about Chernovetskyi. Popov has stated he last met with the mayor toward the end of 2010. Chernovetskyi's spokeswoman Marta Hrymska told The Associated Press on 8 February 2011 in a phone text message that the mayor resumed duties after a vacation in Georgia. Commentators suggested that by failing to fulfill his duties, Chernovetskyi was trying to force President Yanukovich to stop the investigations into his close aides and that Yanukovych was reluctant to see Chernovetskyi go just yet and share power with a new mayor, because his protégé Popov, was unlikely to get elected. On 24 February 2011 Chernovetskyi did attend a meeting of the Kyiv City Council.

On 3 August 2011 it was reported that Chernovetskyi has secretly left Ukraine and moved to Israel. According to Agence France Press, he was discovered by a crew of Ukrainian television channel 1+1 in an apartment in Tel Aviv. In a brief statement, Chernovetskyi, who was surprised they had found him, called it "an unofficial holiday". It had been reported earlier, that he has held Israeli citizenship since 1994, having run for president and for Kyiv mayor while holding dual Israeli and Ukrainian citizenships in violation of Ukrainian law, which does not allow its citizens to hold dual citizenship.

In February 2012 Chernovetskyi stated he will not run for re-election.

Chernovetskyi tendered his resignation on 1 June 2012. The city council accepted the early termination of office on 12 July 2012. The city council decided the same day that Halyna Hereha would temporarily act as the mayor of the capital city. Kyiv then did not have an elected mayor until mayor Vitali Klitschko was sworn in on 5 June 2014.

After the resignation of mayor Leonid Chernovetskyi continued to engage actively in charity. Ex-mayor is spending at least $1 million a year for charity according to his own statement. In September 2013 he opened children's home in Georgia.

== Charity ==
After tragic events in Ukraine in February 2014, Chernovetskyi donated 10 million UAH to bereaved families. “I clearly understand that money will not compensate a loss of close relatives and loved ones, but I cannot stand aside”, he said. Leonid Chernovetskyi founded charity foundation in Georgia and for today it is the biggest local charity foundation called as Chernovetskyi Charity Fund. Leonid Chernovetskyi has been doing charity work for more than 18 years. Today he runs the same name fund - Chernovetskyi Foundation in Georgia, which supplies more than 3,500 extremely needy Georgians daily and also provides free nursing services to 500 elderly bedridden people who can not move independently. There are 3 orphanages in Georgia under the management and financing of the Chernovetskyi Foundation. Chernovetskyi actively participates in the daily life of Georgia. He repeatedly announced rewards for catching various criminals wanted by the Georgian authorities. Leonid Chernovetskyi donated 25,000 lari to the family of the special forces deceased in the international anti-terrorist operation. He also handed monetary awards to all wounded special forces and employees of the security agency who took part in the anti-terrorist operation.

== Family and private life ==
In 2013 grandson of Leonid Chernovetskyi became a champion of Catalonia in freestyle wrestling.

In 2014, Chernovetskyi has christened his son Gabriel. This event attracted a lot of mass media attention.

Stepan, the eldest son of Leonid Chernovetskyi, is known for his passion for boxing. According to several mass media, Stepan Chernovetskyi owns promotion company "Elit boxing" and periodically conducts box tournaments.

After this resignation as Kyiv Mayor Chernovetskyi and his family moved to the Georgian town Kobuleti and he has Georgian citizenship

== Interesting Facts ==
In 2008 Chernovetskyi opened, at its own expense, a monument to Georgiy Gongadze and other journalists who died for freedom of speech In 2009 Chernovetskyi published his second and third book “How to become a millionaire” and “History of success” It is noteworthy that Chernovetskyi's second book was inspired by his cat Yasha. At the same time ex-mayor several times stated that image of “immoral politic with mental disorders” was artificially created by mass media that belongs to his opponents oligarchs. Against all accusations in immorality from his political adversaries Leonid Chernovetskyi few times was awarded orders for revival of spirituality and protection of moral values In 2009 Kharkiv publishing house "Folio", in the series “Famous Ukrainians” published a book about Leonid Chernovetskyi.

In 2017 the ex-mayor of Kyiv Leonid Chernovetskyi published a new book "The Crazy Story". Presenting his autobiography Chernovetskyi appealed to remembrances and summed up his life. "I have lived an unusual full life! Life complete of victories and disappointments, friendship and betrayal. But the main thing I'm proud of: I have never asked anyone for anything, I did what I thought was fair, I did not cooperate with any power or bandits, and I have achieved everything that any simple person can only dream about, especially growing up without a father and without any material support from the side, " - he said.

On 1 July 2011 Kyiv Shevchenko district court upheld in full the claim for the protection of honor and dignity of Kyiv Mayor Leonid Chernovetskyi to the publishing house "Economics" and journalist Fеdor Orishuk, the author of the investigation material "The Tithes of the Chernovetskiy Team", published in the newspaper "Delo" (No.10) from 8–14 April 2011. The court considered the information set out in the article that "every tenth object in Kyiv over the past four years has been sold through "converting centers" to companies controlled by "the young team" of Chernovetskiy Leonid Mikhailovich," is unreliable. Commenting on the adopted decision, the plaintiff's counsel stated that the defendants could not provide an evidence base in support of their false, unsubstantiated allegations against Leonid Chernovetskyi and his team. In addition, the lawyer denied the mayor's involvement in the sale of capital objects through the converting centers.

On 1 June 2012 Pechersk court of Kyiv obliged Vitali Klitschko, the leader of a faction in the Kyiv City Council, to refute unreliable information from his pre-election article "Vitali Klitschko: I will run for mayor of Kyiv, And I have nothing to negotiate with Bankova". In the article published in the newspaper and on the website of the "Mirror of the Week", Klitschko claimed that "the Mayor Chernovetskyi, who stole $70 billion, travels abroad." According to Leonid Chernovetskiy, by the decision the court sent a clear signal to politicians that they should be responsible for their words and respect their voters, and not deceive them in the pursuit of the rating.

On 11 July 2017 Pechersk district court of Kyiv recognized individual comments of Karl Volokh in the article "Chernovetskyi will not buy the Georgian parliament for buckwheat" (from 30 August 2016) on the site Новости Украины сегодня. Последние новости дня as unreliable and discrediting honor, dignity and business reputation of Leonid Chernovetskyi, and ordered the last one to pay the plaintiff one thousand UAH of compensation for moral reparations. As stated in the court's decision, the speech, in particular, is about the phrases: "... the former head of Kyiv is the marauder number one in Ukraine" and "Georgia is interested in Chernovetskyi Leonid Mikhailovych as a person who hands out large bribes".

In April 2018 the information portal "Informant" published a misinformation about Leonid Mikhailovich Chernovetskyi: "In 2002, Chernovetskyi from the stage called on сongregation to sell their apartments and pass money to the pastor to finance the election campaigns of the representatives of the sect. During the proceedings it was revealed that Leonid Mikhailovich never appealed to сongregation either or anyone else to "sell apartments" and "fund election campaigns" of anyone. Between the two sides an agreement was concluded on the settlement of the defamation dispute. In pursuance of the agreement, the "Informant" refuted these inaccurate facts, posted relevant refutation and apologized to Leonid Chernovetskyi for distributing unconfirmed and inappropriate information.

== Honours and awards ==
- The order of "St. Michael the Archangel" (24 July 2004) – h.c. of spirituality revival in Ukraine
- Honor of the Supreme Court of Ukraine "For fidelity to the law" (5 May 2006)
- Medal of the Prosecutors Association "For cooperation in approving the law" (26 November 2009)
- "The order for Humanity and Mercy" of St. Mary's Foundation - charitable activity, a significant contribution to the revival of spirituality and moral values (23 June 2006)
- Order of Prince Yaroslav the Wise, 5th class (19 August 2008) - for his significant contribution to the socio-economic and cultural development of the Ukrainian state, significant work achievements and on the occasion of the 17th anniversary of Independence of Ukraine
- Order of Merit, 3rd class (23 August 2005) - for his significant contribution to the socio-economic, scientific and cultural development of Ukraine, significant work achievements and active citizenship activities
- Honoured Lawyer of Ukraine (4 October 1997) - for outstanding contribution to strengthening the rule of law, professionalism
- Commander of the Order of the Three Stars (Latvia, 19 June 2008)
- Order of Honour (Georgia, 2007)

== See also ==
- List of mayors of Kyiv

Political offices
Preceded by Oleksandr Omelchenko	Mayor of Kyiv; 2006 - 2012	Succeeded by Halyna Hereha Acting
Preceded by Oleksandr Omelchenko	Head of the Kyiv City State Administration; 2006 - 2010	Succeeded by Oleksandr Popov
