= 8th Ukrainian Verkhovna Rada =

2014-2019 meeting of the Ukrainian Verkhovna Rada

(Ukraine) Verkhovna Rada of Ukraine of the 8th convocation
←	7th Verkhovna Rada	9th Verkhovna Rada	→
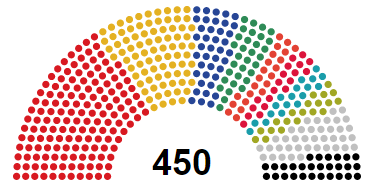
- Seat composition of the 8th Verkhovna Rada

Overview
- Meeting place: Verkhovna Rada building
- Term: 27 November 2014 – 29 August 2019
- Election: 2014 parliamentary election
- Website: iportal.rada.gov.ua
- Members: 423 / 450 (since December 9, 2014)
- Chairman: Volodymyr Groysman; Andriy Parubiy
- First Deputy: Andriy Parubiy; Iryna Herashchenko
- Deputy: Oksana Syroyid
- Party control: Coalition

Sessions
- 1st: November 2014 – January 2015
- 2nd: February 2015 – August 2015
- 3rd: September 2015 – February 2016
- 4th: February 2016 – July 2016
- 5th: September 2016 – January 2017
- 6th: February 2017 – July 2017
- 7th: September 2017 – February 2018
- 8th: February 2018 – July 2018
- 9th: September 2018 – January 2019
- 10th: February 2019 – July 2019

The Verkhovna Rada of Ukraine of the 8th convocation (Ukrainian: Верховна Рада України VIII скликання, Verkhovna Rada Ukrayiny VIII sklykannia) was a convocation of the legislative branch of the Verkhovna Rada, Ukraine's unicameral parliament. The 8th convocation met at the Verkhovna Rada building in Kyiv, having begun its term on 27 November 2014 following the last session of the 7th Verkhovna Rada. Its five-year term came to an end on July 24, 2019, marking the end of its tenth session.

The 8th Verkhovna Rada's composition was based upon the results of the October 26, 2014 parliamentary election, which was contested eight months after the February 2014 Revolution of Dignity, which resulted in the overthrow of the pro-Russian regime of Viktor Yanukovych, alongside the subsequent Russian occupation and annexation of Crimea, as well as the outbreak of the Russian-backed War in Donbas (2014-2022). Ukraine's head of state during the parliament's 8th term was President Petro Poroshenko. Altogether, eleven parties were represented in the Verkhovna Rada, although only six of them surpassed the mandatory five percent election threshold to gain representation based on the proportional representation system.

On the first day of the parliament's session, five of the parliament's pro-European parties, the Petro Poroshenko Bloc, People's Front, Self Reliance, Fatherland, and Radical Party, signed a coalition agreement. Per the coalition agreement, the convocation of parliament was tasked with passing major reforms to ensure Ukrainian membership in European institutions such as the European Union and NATO, while dealing with the threat of further Russian aggression in the Donbas.

President Volodymyr Zelenskyy dissolved the 8th Verkovna Rada on 21 May 2019.

== Post-election developments ==
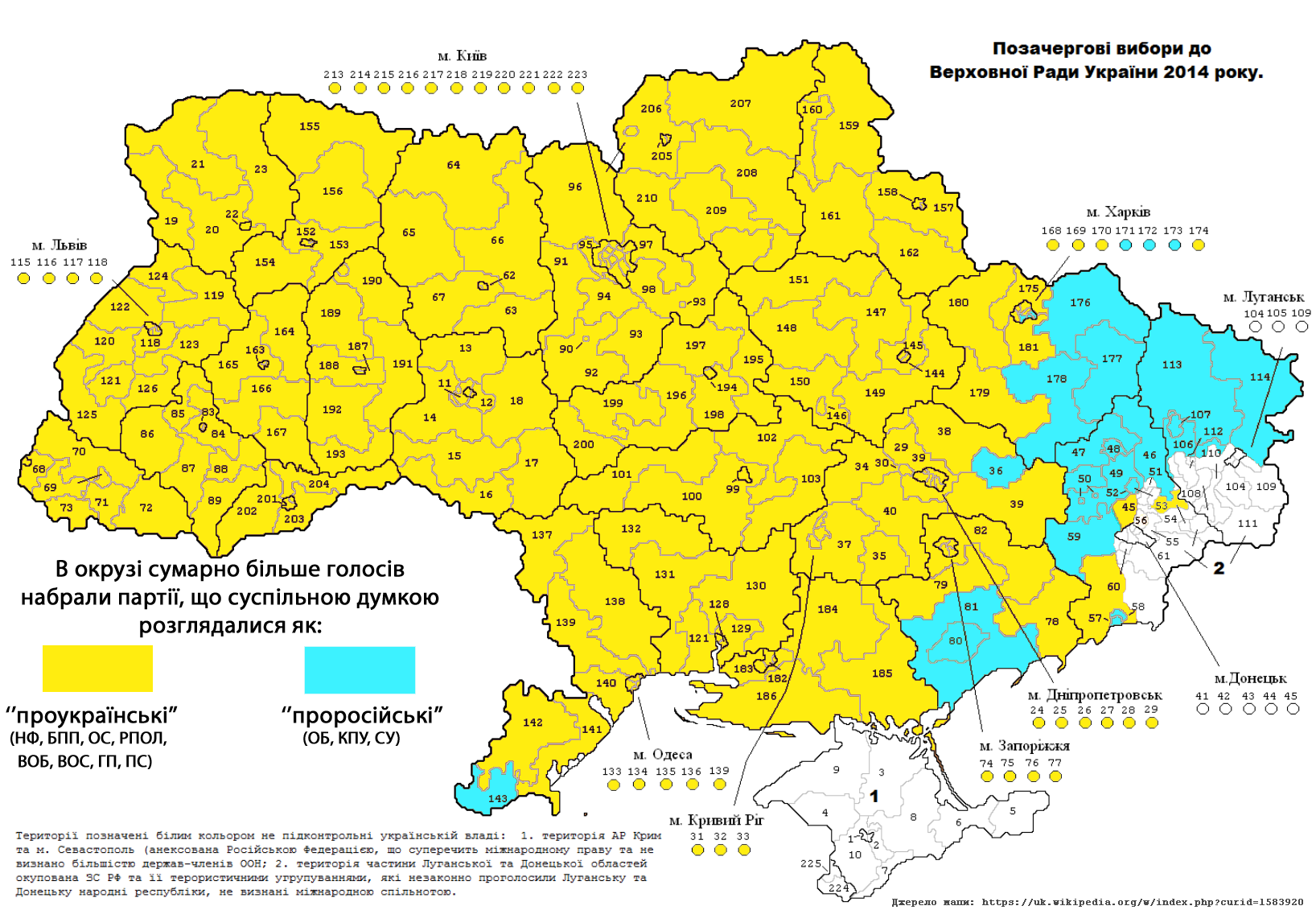
Results of the 2014 election per electoral district. "Pro-Ukrainian" parties are represented in yellow.

Before the parliament's official swearing-in ceremony, Volodymyr Groysman was the chairman of the parliament's preparatory deputy group, with Oksana Syroyid as deputy, and Pavlo Pynzenyk as the secretary. Two deputies, Vitali Klitschko and Ihor Palytsia, rejected their parliamentary mandates to remain in office as Mayor of Kyiv and Governor of Odesa Oblast, respectively. Meanwhile, the parliament's preparatory deputy group adopted a resolution that accepted Nadiya Savchenko's handwritten letter stating that she assumed her parliamentary mandate. Savchenko was held captive by the Russian government from June 2014 until May 2016, after being abducted during the pro-Russian unrest.

Eventually, a total of 27 constituencies were left unelected due to the civil unrest and armed conflict taking place in the country. Precisely speaking, a total of 10 constituencies in the Autonomous Republic of Crimea and two in the City of Sevastopol were not elected due to the 2014 Crimean crisis and subsequent annexation of Crimea by Russia, while a further nine constituencies in Donetsk Oblast and six constituencies in Luhansk Oblast were not elected due to the war that Russian-backed separatists waged in Donbas. Elections in these regions can only take place after the reintroduction of Ukrainian control over the territories that have remained under the Russian occupation to this day (September 2025).

== Major legislation ==
- November 27, 2014: Arseniy Yatsenyuk is confirmed as Prime Minister for a second term with 341 votes in favor.
- December 2, 2014: The second Yatsenyuk government is approved with 288 votes in favor.
- December 23, 2014: Ukraine's status as that of a neutral country, one of the coalition's key points of action, is removed with 303 votes in favor.
- December 25, 2014: The National Security and Defense Council's jurisdiction and authority is expanded with 316 votes in favor.
- December 29, 2014: Along with a collection of other economic policy laws, the 2015 Ukraine budget is approved with 233 votes in favor.

== Leadership ==
=== Leadership (November 2014 – April 2016) ===
On 27 November 2014, the parliament elected Volodymyr Groysman from the Petro Poroshenko Bloc as the Chairman of the Verkhovna Rada. The parliament's chairman, first deputy chairman, and deputy chairman are all unaffiliated people's deputies according to parliamentary procedure. Oksana Syroyid is the first woman to ever hold a deputy chairman position in the Verkhovna Rada.

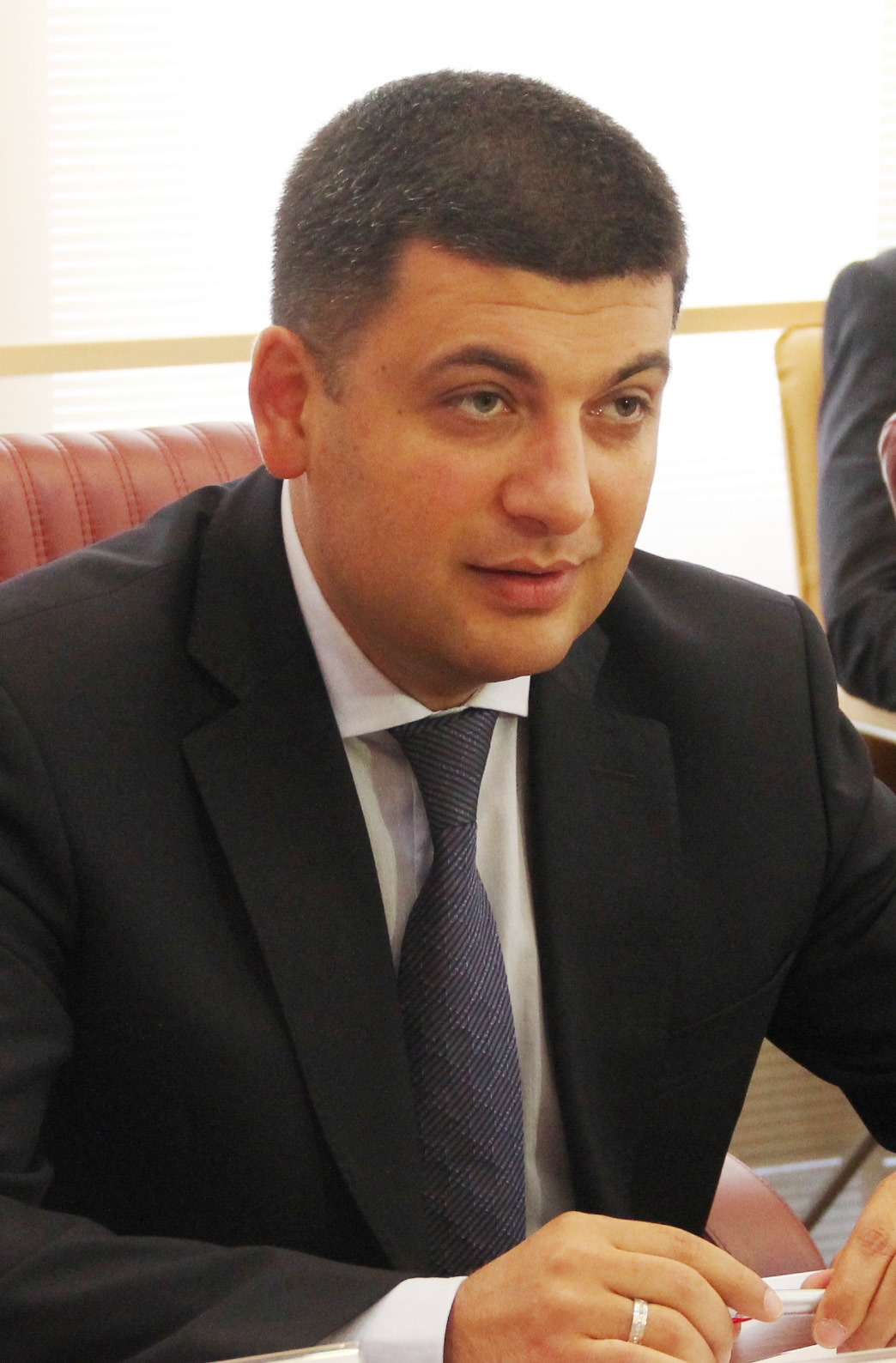
Volodymyr Groysman (from the Petro Poroshenko Bloc) worked as Chairman of the Verkhovna Rada.

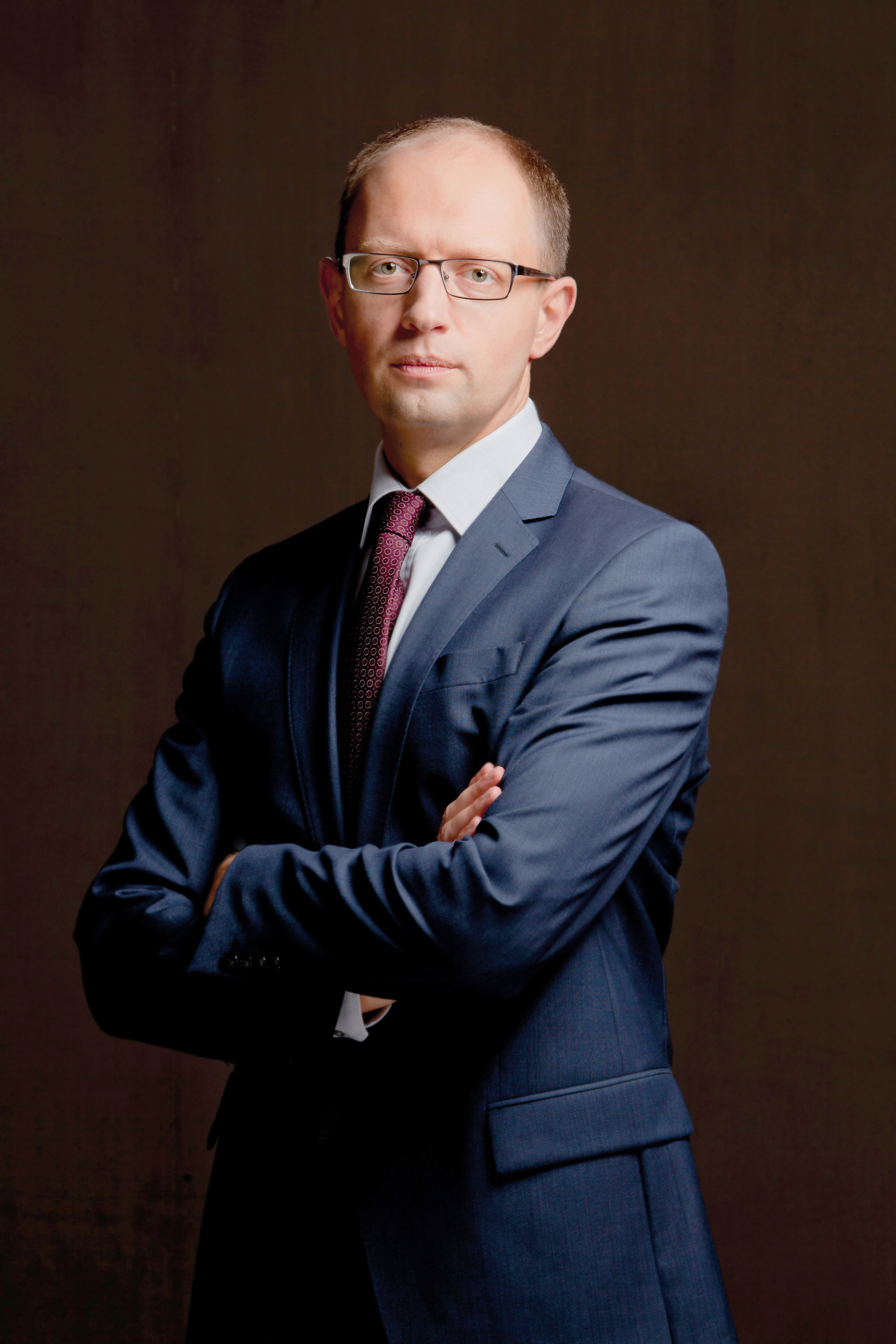
Arseniy Yatsenyuk (from the People's Front) was re-appointed as Prime Minister with 341 votes.

Office	MP	Vote	Since	Parliamentary affiliation
Chairman	Volodymyr Groysman	359–0–3	27 November 2014	Non-affiliated
First Deputy Chairman	Andriy Parubiy	313–23–4	2 December 2014	Non-affiliated
Deputy Chairwoman	Oksana Syroyid	313–23–4	2 December 2014	Non-affiliated
Faction leader(s)	Yuriy Lutsenko		27 November 2014	Petro Poroshenko Bloc
Faction leader(s)	Oleksandr Turchynov		27 November 2014	People's Front
Faction leader(s)	Yuriy Boyko		27 November 2014	Opposition Bloc
Faction leader(s)	Oleh Bereziuk		27 November 2014	Self Reliance
Faction leader(s)	Oleh Lyashko		27 November 2014	Radical Party of Oleh Lyashko
Faction leader(s)	Yulia Tymoshenko		27 November 2014	All-Ukrainian Union "Fatherland"
Group leader(s)	Ihor Yeremeyev		27 November 2014	People's Will
Group leader(s)	Vitaliy Khomutynnik		27 November 2014	Revival

=== Leadership (April 2016 – July 2019) ===
Office	MP	Vote	Since	Parliamentary affiliation
Chairman	Andriy Parubiy	284-30-9	14 April 2016	Non-affiliated
First Deputy Chairwoman	Iryna Herashchenko	260-4-20	14 April 2016	Non-affiliated
Deputy Chairwoman	Oksana Syroyid		2 December 2014	Non-affiliated
Faction leader(s)	Ihor Hryniv		17 May 2016	Petro Poroshenko Bloc
Faction leader(s)	Maksym Burbak		3 July 2015	People's Front
Faction leader(s)	Yuriy Boyko		27 November 2014	Opposition Bloc
Faction leader(s)	Oleh Bereziuk		27 November 2014	Self Reliance
Faction leader(s)	Oleh Lyashko		27 November 2014	Radical Party of Oleh Lyashko
Faction leader(s)	Yulia Tymoshenko		27 November 2014	All-Ukrainian Union "Fatherland"
Group leader(s)	Ihor Yeremeyev		27 November 2014	People's Will
Group leader(s)	Vitaliy Khomutynnik		27 November 2014	Revival

== Members ==
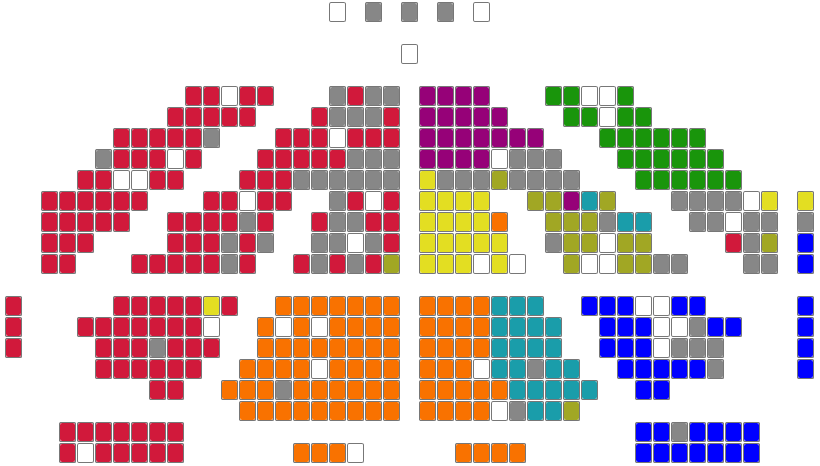
Location of parliamentary factions in the 8th Verkhovna Rada: – Poroshenko Bloc – People's Front – Opposition Bloc / – Self Reliance – Radical Party – People's Will / – Fatherland – Revival – Unaffiliated

During its 8th term, from November 2014 to August 2019, the Verkhovna Rada consisted of a total of 420 deputies, who belonged to one of six political parties' parliamentary factions, two parliamentary groups, alongside the 38 unaffiliated people's deputies. Moreover, for the first time in Ukrainian history, the Communist Party of Ukraine has failed to gain enough votes to pass the threshold required to have any representatives in the Verkhovna Rada.

Meanwhile, the Ukrainian Democratic Alliance for Reform (UDAR), which had 40 seats in the previous parliament's convocation, did not participate in the election independently. For the 2014 parliamentary election, UDAR merged its electoral lists with those of the Petro Poroshenko Bloc, being allocated 30 percent of the bloc's electoral list.

A large portion of the 8th Verkhovna Rada's deputies were first-term deputies without prior legislative service. Additionally, this convocation of parliament also had the largest representation of women in the Ukrainian parliament's history. While the women's participation rate in parliament was lower than the 25.3 percent average of the OSCE member states, 49 of the deputies in parliament were women (approximately 12 percent).

Out of the newly elected deputies, 410 possessed an academic degree; a further 144 deputies possessed two or more such degrees. At that time, fifty-four deputies were candidates for doctoral studies, while 27 of them already possessed a doctoral degree. The oldest member of parliament was the Opposition Bloc's Yukhym Zvyahilsky, who was elected from a constituency seat in northern Donetsk.

The 8th Ukrainian Verkhovna Rada began its term on 27 November 2014. 421 people's deputies were elected during the 2014 Ukrainian parliamentary elections.

=== Party list People's Deputies ===
Party list number	Deputy	Assumed office	Left office	Lifespan
People's Front, No. 1	Arseniy Yatsenyuk	2007	2014	Born 22 May 1974 (age 52)
People's Front, No. 2	Tetiana Chornovol	2014	2019	Born 4 March 1979 (age 47)
People's Front, No. 3	Oleksandr Turchynov	2012	2015	Born 31 March 1964 (age 62)
People's Front, No. 4	Andriy Parubiy	2007	2019	Born 31 January 1971 (age 55)
People's Front, No. 5	Andriy Teteruk	2014	2019	Born 15 May 1973 (age 53)
People's Front, No. 6	Arsen Avakov	2014	2014	Born 1 February 1964 (age 62)
People's Front, No. 7	Viktoria Siumar	2014	2019	Born 23 October 1977 (age 49)
People's Front, No. 8	Vyacheslav Kyrylenko	1998	2014	Born 7 June 1968 (age 58)
People's Front, No. 9	Liliya Hrynevych	2012	2016	Born 13 May 1965 (age 61)
People's Front, No. 10	Yuriy Bereza	2014	2019	Born 8 February 1970 (age 56)
People's Front, No. 11	Pavlo Petrenko	2012	2014	Born 17 July 1979 (age 47)
People's Front, No. 12	Serhiy Pashynskyi	2006	2019	Born 14 October 1966 (age 60)
People's Front, No. 13	Dmytro Tymchuk	2014	2019	27 June 1972 – 19 June 2019 (aged 46)
People's Front, No. 14	Mykola Martynenko	1998	2015	Born 12 January 1961 (age 65)
People's Front, No. 15	Lyudmyla Denisova	2012	2018	Born 6 July 1960 (age 66)
People's Front, No. 16	Andriy Ivanchuk	2012	2019	Born 16 June 1973 (age 53)
People's Front, No. 17	Ihor Vasiunyk	2012	2019	Born 1 August 1969 (age 57)
People's Front, No. 18	Ruslan Lukianchuk	2006	2019	Born 19 March 1972 (age 54)
People's Front, No. 19	Valerii Lunchenko	2012	2019	Born 13 October 1982 (age 44)
People's Front, No. 20	Tetiana Donets	2012	2019	Born 11 July 1980 (age 46)
People's Front, No. 21	Anton Herashchenko	2014	2019	Born 10 February 1979 (age 47)
People's Front, No. 22	Yuriy Savchuk	2012	2019	Born 22 June 1967 (age 59)
People's Front, No. 23	Andriy Levus	2014	2019	Born 9 August 1979 (age 47)
People's Front, No. 24	Denys Dzenzerskyi	2012	2019	Born 22 December 1978 (age 47)
People's Front, No. 25	Volodymyr Shkvaryliuk	2012	2019	Born 9 July 1974 (age 52)
People's Front, No. 26	Kostiantyn Mateichenko	2014	2019	Born 17 December 1970 (age 55)
People's Front, No. 27	Olena Ledovskykh	2014	2019	Born 6 April 1960 (age 66)
People's Front, No. 28	Olena Kolhanova	2014	2019	Born 9 December 1969 (age 56)
People's Front, No. 29	Serhiy Faiermark	2012	2019	Born 14 March 1962 (age 64)
People's Front, No. 30	Vadym Sydorchuk	2014	2019	Born 2 November 1979 (age 47)
People's Front, No. 31	Roman Zastavnyi	2014	2019	Born 1 May 1972 (age 54)
People's Front, No. 32	Yevhen Deidei	2014	2019	Born 12 July 1987 (age 39)
People's Front, No. 33	Ostap Semerak	2014	2016	Born 27 June 1972 (age 54)
People's Front, No. 34	Mykola Kniazhytskyi	2012	2019	Born 2 June 1968 (age 58)
People's Front, No. 35	Valery Babenko	2014	2019	Born 2 February 1964 (age 62)
People's Front, No. 36	Oleksandr Ksenzhuk	2014	2019	Born 11 June 1968 (age 58)
People's Front, No. 37	Georgii Logvynskyi	2014	2019	Born 3 August 1978 (age 48)
People's Front, No. 38	Viktor Yelensky	2014	2019	Born 26 March 1957 (age 69)
People's Front, No. 39	Maksym Polyakov	2014	2019	Born 23 April 1982 (age 44)
People's Front, No. 40	Mykola Velychkovych	2014	2019	Born 18 November 1972 (age 53)
People's Front, No. 41	Oleksandr Horbunov	2014	2019	Born 13 February 1969 (age 57)
People's Front, No. 42	Mykhailo Khmil	2014	2019	Born 11 May 1973 (age 53)
People's Front, No. 43	Pavlo Unguryan	2014	2019	Born 12 November 1979 (age 46)
People's Front, No. 44	Serhiy Vysotskyi	2014	2019	Born 13 July 1985 (age 41)
People's Front, No. 45	Petro Vanat	2014	2017	28 January 1938 – 8 February 2017 (aged 79)
People's Front, No. 46	Svitlana Voitsekhovska	2014	2019	Born 12 September 1959 (age 67)
People's Front, No. 47	Ihor Brychenko	2014	2019	Born 7 July 1970 (age 56)
People's Front, No. 48	Ihor Kotvitskyi	2014	2019	Born 24 January 1970 (age 56)
People's Front, No. 49	Pavlo Pynzenyk	2014	2019	Born 20 March 1976 (age 50)
People's Front, No. 50	Oleksandr Sochka	2014	2019	Born 19 February 1971 (age 55)
People's Front, No. 51	Mykola Kadykalo	2014	2019	Born 19 December 1974 (age 51)
People's Front, No. 52	Olena Masorina	2014	2019	Born 17 March 1986 (age 40)
People's Front, No. 53	Oleksandr Prysiazhniuk	2014	2019	Born 20 April 1981 (age 45)
People's Front, No. 54	Nataliya Katser-Buchkovska	2014	2019	Born 15 March 1983 (age 43)
People's Front, No. 55	Volodymyr Soliar	2014	2019	Born 6 February 1981 (age 45)
People's Front, No. 56	Dmytro Storozhuk	2014	2016	Born 12 February 1985 (age 41)
People's Front, No. 59	Taras Kremin	2014	2019	Born 10 June 1978 (age 48)
People's Front, No. 60	Vadym Kryvenko	2014	2019	Born 8 September 1968 (age 58)
People's Front, No. 63	Iryna Yefremova	2014	2018	Born 26 March 1959 (age 67)
People's Front, No. 64	Ihor Aleksieiev	2014	2019	Born 23 April 1986 (age 40)
People's Front, No. 66	Olena Boiko	2014	2019	Born 7 August 1972 (age 54)
People's Front, No. 67	Vitaliy Korchyk	2014	2019	Born 18 April 1984 (age 42)
People's Front, No. 68	Andriy Pomazanov	2014	2019	Born 2 August 1983 (age 43)
People's Front, No. 69	Hennadii Kryvosheia	2014	2019	Born 2 July 1977 (age 49)
People's Front, No. 70	Dmytro Stetsenko	2014	2019	Born 6 November 1987 (age 38)
People's Front, No. 71	Serhii Draiuk	2014	2019	Born 18 June 1953 (age 73)
People's Front, No. 72	Oleksandr Romanovskyi	2014	2019	Born 10 August 1952 (age 74)
People's Front, No. 74	Oleksandr Drozdyk	2014	2019	Born 14 June 1983 (age 43)
People's Front, No. 75	Yuriy Babiy	2015	2019	Born 14 June 1983 (age 43)
People's Front, No. 76	Vadym Pidberezniak	2015	2019	Born 22 March 1972 (age 54)
People's Front, No. 77	Yaroslav Yedakov	2016	2019	Born 25 January 1976 (age 50)
People's Front, No. 78	Kvycha Meparishvili	2016	2019	Born 7 August 1972 (age 54)
People's Front, No. 79	Vladyslav Danilin	2016	2019	Born 2 March 1983 (age 43)
People's Front, No. 80	Fedir Bendiuzhenko	2017	2019	Born 23 July 1982 (age 44)
People's Front, No. 81	Mykhailo Pobochikh	2018	2019	Born 6 October 1986 (age 40)
People's Front, No. 84	Ivan Savka	2018	2019	Born 29 February 1972 (age 54)
Petro Poroshenko Bloc, No. 2	Yuriy Lutsenko	2014	2016	Born 18 November 1977 (age 48)
Petro Poroshenko Bloc, No. 3	Olha Bohomolets	2014	2019	Born 22 March 1966 (age 60)
Petro Poroshenko Bloc, No. 4	Volodymyr Groysman	2014	2016	Born 20 January 1978 (age 48)
Petro Poroshenko Bloc, No. 5	Mustafa Dzhemilev	1998	2019	Born 13 November 1943 (age 82)
Petro Poroshenko Bloc, No. 6	Yuliy Mamchur	2014	2019	Born 15 August 1971 (age 55)
Petro Poroshenko Bloc, No. 7	Maria Matios	2012	2019	Born 19 December 1959 (age 66)
Petro Poroshenko Bloc, No. 8	Mykola Tomenko	2006	2016	Born 11 December 1964 (age 61)
Petro Poroshenko Bloc, No. 9	Iryna Herashchenko	2007	2019	Born 15 May 1971 (age 55)
Petro Poroshenko Bloc, No. 10	Vitalii Kovalchuk	2012	2015	Born 23 May 1969 (age 57)
Petro Poroshenko Bloc, No. 11	Serhiy Kvit	2014	2014	Born 26 November 1965 (age 60)
Petro Poroshenko Bloc, No. 12	Ruslan Kniazevych	2006	2019	Born 28 June 1974 (age 52)
Petro Poroshenko Bloc, No. 13	Yuriy Stets	2007	2014	Born 29 December 1975 (age 50)
Petro Poroshenko Bloc, No. 14	Ihor Hryniv	2014	2019	Born 10 March 1961 (age 65)
Petro Poroshenko Bloc, No. 15	Oksana Prodan	2012	2019	Born 16 May 1974 (age 52)
Petro Poroshenko Bloc, No. 16	Natalia Novak	2012	2019	Born 21 November 1955 (age 70)
Petro Poroshenko Bloc, No. 17	Viktor Pynzenyk	2012	2019	Born 15 April 1954 (age 72)
Petro Poroshenko Bloc, No. 18	Svitlana Zalishchuk	2014	2019	Born 24 October 1982 (age 44)
Petro Poroshenko Bloc, No. 19	Serhiy Leshchenko	2014	2019	Born 30 August 1980 (age 46)
Petro Poroshenko Bloc, No. 20	Mustafa Nayyem	2014	2019	Born 28 June 1981 (age 45)
Petro Poroshenko Bloc, No. 21	Oleksandr Chernenko	2014	2019	Born 26 February 1976 (age 50)
Petro Poroshenko Bloc, No. 22	Rostyslav Pavlenko	2012	2015	Born 19 August 1976 (age 50)
Petro Poroshenko Bloc, No. 23	Maria Ionova	2012	2019	Born 31 May 1978 (age 48)
Petro Poroshenko Bloc, No. 24	Artur Palatnyi	2012	2014	Born 15 July 1973 (age 53)
Petro Poroshenko Bloc, No. 25	Roman Romanyuk	2012	2019	Born 18 October 1961 (age 65)
Petro Poroshenko Bloc, No. 26	Pavlo Rozenko	2012	2014	Born 15 July 1970 (age 56)
Petro Poroshenko Bloc, No. 27	Hryhoriy Zabolotnyi	2012	2019	Born 6 January 1952 (age 74)
Petro Poroshenko Bloc, No. 28	Nina Yuzhanina	2014	2019	Born 11 January 1965 (age 61)
Petro Poroshenko Bloc, No. 29	Igor Kononenko	2014	2019	Born 21 August 1965 (age 61)
Petro Poroshenko Bloc, No. 30	Iryna Friz	2014	2019	Born 25 September 1974 (age 52)
Petro Poroshenko Bloc, No. 31	Bohdan Onufryk	2014	2019	Born 15 April 1958 (age 68)
Petro Poroshenko Bloc, No. 32	Anatoliy Matviyenko	2014	2019	Born 22 March 1953 (age 73)
Petro Poroshenko Bloc, No. 33	Andriy Pavelko	2012	2019	Born 7 October 1975 (age 51)
Petro Poroshenko Bloc, No. 35	Viktor Korol	2014	2019	Born 3 March 1948 (age 78)
Petro Poroshenko Bloc, No. 36	Mykola Palamarchuk	2012	2019	Born 25 April 1954 (age 72)
Petro Poroshenko Bloc, No. 37	Valerii Ishchenko	2012	2019	Born 11 November 1973 (age 52)
Petro Poroshenko Bloc, No. 38	Valerii Patskan	2012	2018	Born 21 April 1975 (age 51)
Petro Poroshenko Bloc, No. 39	Andriy Antonyshchak	2014	2019	Born 23 June 1969 (age 57)
Petro Poroshenko Bloc, No. 40	Oleksiy Goncharenko	2014	2019	Born 16 September 1980 (age 46)
Petro Poroshenko Bloc, No. 41	Leonid Kozachenko	2014	2019	Born 14 May 1955 (age 71)
Petro Poroshenko Bloc, No. 42	Hennadii Tkachuk	2012	2019	Born 27 August 1968 (age 58)
Petro Poroshenko Bloc, No. 43	Artur Herasymov	2014	2019	Born 23 August 1972 (age 54)
Petro Poroshenko Bloc, No. 44	Natalia Kovalchuk	2012	2019	Born 19 September 1977 (age 49)
Petro Poroshenko Bloc, No. 45	Vadym Denysenko	2014	2019	Born 7 April 1974 (age 52)
Petro Poroshenko Bloc, No. 46	Serhii Tryhubenko	2014	2019	Born 6 March 1972 (age 54)
Petro Poroshenko Bloc, No. 47	Olga Bielkova	2012	2019	Born 16 June 1975 (age 51)
Petro Poroshenko Bloc, No. 48	Oleksii Savchenko	2014	2017	Born 19 November 1977 (age 48)
Petro Poroshenko Bloc, No. 49	Olha Chervakova	2014	2019	Born 6 April 1975 (age 51)
Petro Poroshenko Bloc, No. 50	Mykhailo Kobtsev	2014	2019	Born 10 January 1969 (age 57)
Petro Poroshenko Bloc, No. 51	Roman Nasirov	2014	2019	Born 3 March 1979 (age 47)
Petro Poroshenko Bloc, No. 52	Glib Zagoriy	2014	2019	Born 21 August 1976 (age 50)
Petro Poroshenko Bloc, No. 53	Mykhailo Hvozdov	2014	2019	Born 18 February 1973 (age 53)
Petro Poroshenko Bloc, No. 54	Yehor Firsov	2014	2016	Born 1 December 1988 (age 37)
Petro Poroshenko Bloc, No. 55	Serhii Alieksieiev	2014	2019	Born 9 February 1977 (age 49)
Petro Poroshenko Bloc, No. 56	Vitalii Chepynoha	2014	2019	Born 28 May 1969 (age 57)
Petro Poroshenko Bloc, No. 57	Oleksandr Bakumenko	2014	2019	29 April 1959 – 11 April 2022 (aged 62)
Petro Poroshenko Bloc, No. 58	Oleksandr Hranovskyi	2014	2019	Born 25 December 1979 (age 46)
Petro Poroshenko Bloc, No. 59	Stepan Kubiv	2012	2016	Born 19 March 1962 (age 64)
Petro Poroshenko Bloc, No. 60	Oleksii Mushak	2014	2019	Born 28 February 1982 (age 44)
Petro Poroshenko Bloc, No. 61	Ivanna Klympush-Tsintsadze	2014	2016	Born 5 July 1972 (age 54)
Petro Poroshenko Bloc, No. 62	László Brenzovics	2014	2019	Born 25 April 1964 (age 62)
Petro Poroshenko Bloc, No. 63	Serhii Kudlaienko	2014	2019	Born 13 October 1975 (age 51)
Petro Poroshenko Bloc, No. 64	Olena Matuzko	2014	2019	Born 4 November 1976 (age 49)
Petro Poroshenko Bloc, No. 65	Stepan Barna	2014	2015	Born 9 October 1979 (age 47)
Petro Poroshenko Bloc, No. 66	Davyd Makarian	2014	2019	Born 12 August 1984 (age 42)
Petro Poroshenko Bloc, No. 67	Ihor Pober	2014	2019	Born 17 December 1968 (age 57)
Petro Poroshenko Bloc, No. 68	Serhiy Kunitsyn	2014	2019	Born 27 July 1960 (age 66)
Petro Poroshenko Bloc, No. 69	Yaroslav Lesiuk	2015	2019	Born 8 May 1952 (age 74)
Petro Poroshenko Bloc, No. 70	Iryna Lutsenko	2015	2019	Born 7 February 1966 (age 60)
Petro Poroshenko Bloc, No. 71	Refat Chubarov	2015	2019	Born 22 September 1957 (age 69)
Petro Poroshenko Bloc, No. 72	Hryhorii Shverk	2015	2019	Born 20 July 1957 (age 69)
Petro Poroshenko Bloc, No. 74	Vladyslav Sevriukov	2016	2019	Born 13 May 1975 (age 51)
Petro Poroshenko Bloc, No. 75	Oleksandr Bryhynets	2016	2019	Born 14 April 1962 (age 64)
Petro Poroshenko Bloc, No. 76	Dmytro Bilotserkovets	2016	2019	Born 21 February 1986 (age 40)
Petro Poroshenko Bloc, No. 77	Valerii Karpuntsov	2016	2019	Born 15 June 1968 (age 58)
Petro Poroshenko Bloc, No. 78	Oleh Belikin	2016	2019	Born 6 May 1971 (age 55)
Petro Poroshenko Bloc, No. 79	Maksym Savrasov	2016	2019	Born 7 August 1980 (age 46)
Petro Poroshenko Bloc, No. 80	Oksana Bilozir	2016	2019	Born 30 May 1957 (age 69)
Petro Poroshenko Bloc, No. 81	Yurii Buhlak	2017	2019	Born 7 February 1965 (age 61)
Petro Poroshenko Bloc, No. 82	Roman Zvarych	2018	2019	Born 20 November 1953 (age 72)
Petro Poroshenko Bloc, No. 86	Volodymyr Kurennoi	2018	2019	Born 2 August 1967 (age 59)
Self Reliance, No. 1	Hanna Hopko	2014	2019	Born 4 March 1982 (age 44)
Self Reliance, No. 2	Semen Semenchenko	2014	2019	Born 6 March 1974 (age 52)
Self Reliance, No. 3	Oleksiy Skrypnyk	2014	2019	Born 8 March 1964 (age 62)
Self Reliance, No. 4	Oksana Syroyid	2014	2019	Born 2 May 1976 (age 50)
Self Reliance, No. 5	Viktor Kryvenko	2014	2019	Born 9 January 1982 (age 44)
Self Reliance, No. 6	Iryna Suslova	2014	2019	Born 5 August 1988 (age 38)
Self Reliance, No. 7	Pavlo Kyshkar	2014	2019	Born 22 September 1980 (age 46)
Self Reliance, No. 8	Aliona Babak	2014	2017	Born 27 September 1969 (age 57)
Self Reliance, No. 9	Natalia Veselova	2014	2019	Born 27 August 1975 (age 51)
Self Reliance, No. 10	Oleksandr Danchenko	2014	2019	Born 14 November 1974 (age 51)
Self Reliance, No. 11	Olena Sotnyk	2014	2019	Born 21 December 1982 (age 43)
Self Reliance, No. 12	Oleh Lavryk	2014	2019	Born 20 April 1973 (age 53)
Self Reliance, No. 13	Yehor Soboliev	2014	2019	Born 26 February 1977 (age 49)
Self Reliance, No. 14	Yaroslav Markevych	2014	2019	Born 3 December 1972 (age 53)
Self Reliance, No. 15	Ivan Miroshnichenko	2014	2019	Born 29 August 1972 (age 54)
Self Reliance, No. 16	Andriy Zhurzhiy	2014	2019	Born 19 March 1978 (age 48)
Self Reliance, No. 17	Ostap Yednak	2014	2019	Born 21 November 1980 (age 45)
Self Reliance, No. 18	Ihor Didenko	2014	2019	Born 8 February 1967 (age 59)
Self Reliance, No. 19	Tetiana Ostrikova	2014	2019	Born 22 January 1979 (age 47)
Self Reliance, No. 20	Oleksandr Opanasenko	2014	2019	Born 20 April 1977 (age 49)
Self Reliance, No. 21	Ruslan Sydorovych	2014	2019	Born 20 October 1974 (age 52)
Self Reliance, No. 22	Victoria Voytsitska	2014	2019	Born 27 November 1974 (age 51)
Self Reliance, No. 23	Viktoria Ptashnyk	2014	2019	Born 1 January 1983 (age 43)
Self Reliance, No. 25	Iryna Sysoyenko	2014	2019	Born 6 March 1982 (age 44)
Self Reliance, No. 26	Lev Pidlisetskyi	2014	2019	Born 29 May 1977 (age 49)
Self Reliance, No. 27	Roman Semenukha	2014	2019	Born 30 July 1977 (age 49)
Self Reliance, No. 28	Oleh Bereziuk	2014	2019	Born 8 October 1969 (age 57)
Self Reliance, No. 29	Pavlo Kostenko	2014	2019	Born 9 October 1976 (age 50)
Self Reliance, No. 30	Anna Romanova	2014	2019	Born 21 February 1985 (age 41)
Self Reliance, No. 31	Andriy Miroshnyk	2014	2015	Born 2 November 1980 (age 46)
Self Reliance, No. 32	Serhiy Kiral	2014	2019	Born 21 March 1975 (age 51)
Self Reliance, No. 33	Andriy Nemyrovskyi	2015	2019	Born 23 September 1983 (age 43)
Self Reliance, No. 34	Liubomyr Zubach	2015	2019	Born 21 January 1978 (age 48)
Opposition Bloc, No. 1	Yuriy Boyko	2014	2019	Born 9 October 1958 (age 68)
Opposition Bloc, No. 2	Oleksandr Vilkul	2014	2019	Born 24 May 1974 (age 52)
Opposition Bloc, No. 3	Mykhailo Dobkin	2014	2019	Born 26 January 1970 (age 56)
Opposition Bloc, No. 4	Vadim Rabinovich	2014	2019	Born 4 August 1953 (age 73)
Opposition Bloc, No. 5	Oleksii Bilyi	2006	2019	Born 1 May 1961 (age 65)
Opposition Bloc, No. 6	Serhiy Larin	2014	2019	Born 11 January 1962 (age 64)
Opposition Bloc, No. 7	Nestor Shufrych	2007	2019	Born 29 December 1966 (age 59)
Opposition Bloc, No. 8	Natalia Korolevska	2014	2019	Born 18 May 1975 (age 51)
Opposition Bloc, No. 9	Tatyana Bakhteeva	2002	2019	Born 27 November 1953 (age 72)
Opposition Bloc, No. 10	Mykola Skoryk	2014	2019	Born 27 November 1972 (age 53)
Opposition Bloc, No. 11	Vadym Novynskyi	2013	2019	Born 3 June 1963 (age 63)
Opposition Bloc, No. 12	Serhiy Lyovochkin	2014	2019	Born 17 July 1972 (age 54)
Opposition Bloc, No. 13	Yuriy Boropayev	2007	2019	Born 11 January 1955 (age 71)
Opposition Bloc, No. 14	Taras Kozak	2014	2019	Born 6 April 1972 (age 54)
Opposition Bloc, No. 15	Volodymyr Husak	2014	2019	Born 21 November 1974 (age 51)
Opposition Bloc, No. 16	Yulia Lyovochkina	2007	2019	Born 17 February 1977 (age 49)
Opposition Bloc, No. 17	Andriy Kiselov	2014	2019	Born 2 January 1981 (age 45)
Opposition Bloc, No. 18	Ivan Myrnyi	2013	2019	Born 7 June 1954 (age 72)
Opposition Bloc, No. 19	Yuriy Moroko	2012	2019	Born 6 May 1953 (age 73)
Opposition Bloc, No. 20	Yuriy Miroshychenko	2006	2019	Born 3 February 1970 (age 56)
Opposition Bloc, No. 21	Dmytro Koliesnikov	2014	2019	Born 27 March 1972 (age 54)
Opposition Bloc, No. 22	Mykhailo Papiev	2014	2019	Born 1 October 1960 (age 66)
Opposition Bloc, No. 23	Oleksandr Dolzhenkov	2014	2019	Born 26 April 1983 (age 43)
Opposition Bloc, No. 24	Yurii Pavlenko	2002	2019	Born 20 March 1975 (age 51)
Opposition Bloc, No. 25	Vasyl Nimchenko	2014	2019	Born 13 September 1950 (age 76)
Opposition Bloc, No. 26	Oleksandr Nechayev	2012	2019	Born 15 June 1963 (age 63)
Opposition Bloc, No. 27	Ihor Shurma	2014	2019	Born 26 September 1958 (age 68)
Radical Party of Oleh Liashko, No. 1	Oleh Liashko	2006	2019	Born 3 December 1972 (age 53)
Radical Party of Oleh Liashko, No. 2	Andriy Lozovoy	2014	2019	Born 3 March 1989 (age 37)
Radical Party of Oleh Liashko, No. 3	Serhiy Melnychuk	2014	2019	Born 26 January 1972 (age 54)
Radical Party of Oleh Liashko, No. 4	Zlata Ognevich	2014	2015	Born 12 January 1986 (age 40)
Radical Party of Oleh Liashko, No. 5	Yurii Shukhevych	2014	2019	28 March 1933 – 22 November 2022 (aged 89)
Radical Party of Oleh Liashko, No. 6	Ihor Popov	2014	2019	Born 18 April 1972 (age 54)
Radical Party of Oleh Liashko, No. 7	Artem Vitko	2014	2019	Born 31 January 1983 (age 43)
Radical Party of Oleh Liashko, No. 8	Valeriy Voshchevsky	2014	2014	Born 12 June 1956 (age 70)
Radical Party of Oleh Liashko, No. 9	Ihor Mosiychuk	2014	2019	Born 5 May 1972 (age 54)
Radical Party of Oleh Liashko, No. 10	Viktor Halasiuk	2014	2019	Born 28 August 1981 (age 45)
Radical Party of Oleh Liashko, No. 11	Oleksiy Lenskyi	2014	2019	Born 25 February 1975 (age 51)
Radical Party of Oleh Liashko, No. 12	Denys Sylantyev	2014	2019	Born 3 October 1976 (age 50)
Radical Party of Oleh Liashko, No. 13	Alona Koshelieva	2014	2019	Born 14 July 1990 (age 36)
Radical Party of Oleh Liashko, No. 16	Andriy Artemenko	2014	2017	Born 14 January 1969 (age 57)
Radical Party of Oleh Liashko, No. 17	Oleh Kupriyenko	2014	2019	Born 18 August 1964 (age 62)
Radical Party of Oleh Liashko, No. 18	Oleksiy Kyrychenko	2014	2019	Born 18 August 1964 (age 62)
Radical Party of Oleh Liashko, No. 19	Serhiy Skuratovskyi	2014	2019	Born 4 February 1971 (age 55)
Radical Party of Oleh Liashko, No. 20	Dmytro Linko	2014	2019	Born 14 July 1987 (age 39)
Radical Party of Oleh Liashko, No. 21	Vasyl Amelchenko	2014	2019	Born 28 November 1962 (age 63)
Radical Party of Oleh Liashko, No. 22	Serhiy Rybalka	2014	2019	Born 22 July 1978 (age 48)
Radical Party of Oleh Liashko, No. 23	Viktor Vovk	2014	2019	Born 20 May 1962 (age 64)
Radical Party of Oleh Liashko, No. 24	Oksana Korchynska	2014	2019	Born 17 November 1970 (age 55)
Radical Party of Oleh Liashko, No. 25	Yuriy Chyzhmar	2014	2019	Born 27 October 1984 (age 42)
Radical Party of Oleh Liashko, No. 26	Tetiana Yuzkova	2015	2018	Born 1 September 1963 (age 63)
Radical Party of Oleh Liashko, No. 28	Valeria Zaruzhko	2017	2019	Born 2 December 1978 (age 47)
Radical Party of Oleh Liashko, No. 30	Oleksandr Hulak	2018	2019	Born 6 October 1974 (age 52)
Batkivshchyna, No. 1	Nadiya Savchenko	2014	2019	Born 11 May 1981 (age 45)
Batkivshchyna, No. 2	Yulia Tymoshenko	2014	2019	Born 27 November 1960 (age 65)
Batkivshchyna, No. 3	Ihor Lutsenko	2014	2019	Born 10 November 1978 (age 47)
Batkivshchyna, No. 4	Serhiy Sobolyev	2014	2019	Born 5 September 1961 (age 65)
Batkivshchyna, No. 5	Alyona Shkrum	2014	2019	Born 2 January 1988 (age 38)
Batkivshchyna, No. 6	Vadym Ivchenko	2014	2019	Born 29 January 1980 (age 46)
Batkivshchyna, No. 7	Hryhoriy Nemyria	2014	2019	Born 8 June 1966 (age 60)
Batkivshchyna, No. 8	Ivan Krulko	2014	2019	Born 20 July 1981 (age 45)
Batkivshchyna, No. 9	Oleksiy Ryabchyn	2014	2019	Born 22 April 1983 (age 43)
Batkivshchyna, No. 10	Ihor Zhdanov	2014	2014	Born 29 December 1967 (age 58)
Batkivshchyna, No. 11	Dmytro Shlemko	2006	2015	Born 24 January 1950 (age 76)
Batkivshchyna, No. 12	Borys Tarasyuk	2012	2019	Born 1 January 1949 (age 77)
Batkivshchyna, No. 13	Andriy Kozhemiakin	2006	2019	Born 13 November 1965 (age 60)
Batkivshchyna, No. 14	Ivan Kyrylenko	2006	2019	Born 2 October 1956 (age 70)
Batkivshchyna, No. 15	Serhiy Vlasenko	2008	2019	Born 7 March 1967 (age 59)
Batkivshchyna, No. 16	Oleksandra Kuzhel	2012	2019	Born 4 July 1953 (age 73)
Batkivshchyna, No. 17	Oleksandr Abdullin	1998	2019	Born 29 June 1962 (age 64)
Batkivshchyna, No. 18	Olena Kondratiuk	2014	2019	Born 17 November 1970 (age 55)
Batkivshchyna, No. 19	Valeriy Dubil	2015	2019	Born 26 June 1973 (age 53)

=== Single-mandate district People's Deputies ===
Oblast	District	Deputy	Party	Assumed office	Left office	Lifespan
Autonomous Republic of Crimea	No. 1	Occupied by Russia; see Annexation of Crimea by the Russian Federation				
Autonomous Republic of Crimea	No. 2	Occupied by Russia; see Annexation of Crimea by the Russian Federation				
Autonomous Republic of Crimea	No. 3	Occupied by Russia; see Annexation of Crimea by the Russian Federation				
Autonomous Republic of Crimea	No. 4	Occupied by Russia; see Annexation of Crimea by the Russian Federation				
Autonomous Republic of Crimea	No. 5	Occupied by Russia; see Annexation of Crimea by the Russian Federation				
Autonomous Republic of Crimea	No. 6	Occupied by Russia; see Annexation of Crimea by the Russian Federation				
Autonomous Republic of Crimea	No. 7	Occupied by Russia; see Annexation of Crimea by the Russian Federation				
Autonomous Republic of Crimea	No. 8	Occupied by Russia; see Annexation of Crimea by the Russian Federation				
Autonomous Republic of Crimea	No. 9	Occupied by Russia; see Annexation of Crimea by the Russian Federation				
Autonomous Republic of Crimea	No. 10	Occupied by Russia; see Annexation of Crimea by the Russian Federation				
Vinnytsia Oblast	No. 11	Oleksandr Dombrovskyi	Petro Poroshenko Bloc	2012	2019	Born 7 July 1962 (age 64)
Vinnytsia Oblast	No. 12	Oleksiy Poroshenko	Petro Poroshenko Bloc	2014	2019	Born 6 March 1985 (age 41)
Vinnytsia Oblast	No. 13	Petro Yurchyshyn	Petro Poroshenko Bloc (Note: Elected as an independent.)	2014	2019	Born 13 July 1958 (age 68)
Vinnytsia Oblast	No. 14	Ivan Melnychuk	Petro Poroshenko Bloc	2014	2019	Born 8 February 1969 (age 57)
Vinnytsia Oblast	No. 15	Ivan Sporysh	Petro Poroshenko Bloc	2014	2019	Born 8 August 1959 (age 67)
Vinnytsia Oblast	No. 16	Yuriy Makedon	Petro Poroshenko Bloc	2014	2019	Born 24 October 1980 (age 46)
Vinnytsia Oblast	No. 17	Mykola Kucher	Petro Poroshenko Bloc	2014	2019	Born 24 August 1959 (age 67)
Vinnytsia Oblast	No. 18	Ruslan Demchak	Petro Poroshenko Bloc	2014	2019	Born 5 July 1974 (age 52)
Volyn Oblast	No. 19	Ihor Huz	People's Front	2014	2019	Born 11 January 1982 (age 44)
Volyn Oblast	No. 20	Serhiy Martyniak	People's Will	2012	2019	Born 4 March 1971 (age 55)
Volyn Oblast	No. 21	Stepan Ivakhiv	Independent	2012	2019	Born 24 January 1968 (age 58)
Volyn Oblast	No. 22	Ihor Lapin	People's Front	2014	2019	Born 28 May 1969 (age 57)
Volyn Oblast	No. 23	Ihor Yeremeyev	People's Will	2014	2015	3 April 1968 – 13 August 2015 (aged 47)
Volyn Oblast	No. 23	Iryna Konstankevych	UKROP	2016	2019	Born 23 June 1965 (age 61)
Dnipropetrovsk Oblast	No. 24	Yakiv Bezbakh	Independent	2012	2019	Born 8 September 1957 (age 69)
Dnipropetrovsk Oblast	No. 25	Maksym Kuriachyi	Petro Poroshenko Bloc	2014	2019	Born 8 November 1979 (age 46)
Dnipropetrovsk Oblast	No. 26	Andriy Denysenko	Petro Poroshenko Bloc	2014	2019	Born 1 January 1973 (age 53)
Dnipropetrovsk Oblast	No. 27	Borys Filatov	Independent	2014	2019	Born 7 March 1972 (age 54)
Dnipropetrovsk Oblast	No. 27	Tetiana Rychkova	Petro Poroshenko Bloc	2014	2019	Born 7 October 1978 (age 48)
Dnipropetrovsk Oblast	No. 28	Ivan Kulichenko	Petro Poroshenko Bloc	2014	2019	Born 7 July 1955 (age 71)
Dnipropetrovsk Oblast	No. 29	Vitaliy Kupriy	Independent (Note: Elected as a member of Petro Poroshenko Bloc.)	2014	2019	Born 20 August 1973 (age 53)
Dnipropetrovsk Oblast	No. 30	Oleksandr Dubinin	Petro Poroshenko Bloc	2014	2019	Born 16 May 1959 (age 67)
Dnipropetrovsk Oblast	No. 31	Kostiantyn Pavlov	Opposition Bloc	2014	2019	Born 12 January 1973 (age 53)
Dnipropetrovsk Oblast	No. 32	Andriy Halchenko	Opposition Bloc	2014	2019	Born 13 August 1971 (age 55)
Dnipropetrovsk Oblast	No. 33	Kostiantyn Usov	Petro Poroshenko Bloc	2014	2019	Born 9 August 1988 (age 38)
Dnipropetrovsk Oblast	No. 34	Oleh Kryshyn	People's Front	2014	2019	Born 27 December 1967 (age 58)
Dnipropetrovsk Oblast	No. 35	Andriy Shypko	Revival	2012	2019	Born 26 March 1970 (age 56)
Dnipropetrovsk Oblast	No. 36	Artur Martovytskyi	Opposition Bloc	2012	2019	Born 20 December 1978 (age 47)
Dnipropetrovsk Oblast	No. 37	Dmytro Shpenov	Independent	2012	2019	Born 20 December 1978 (age 47)
Dnipropetrovsk Oblast	No. 38	Vadym Nesterenko	Independent	2014	2019	Born 5 December 1970 (age 55)
Dnipropetrovsk Oblast	No. 39	Dmytro Yarosh	Right Sector	2014	2019	Born 30 September 1971 (age 55)
Dnipropetrovsk Oblast	No. 40	Valentyn Didych	Petro Poroshenko Bloc	2014	2019	Born 11 October 1947 (age 79)
Donetsk Oblast	No. 41	Occupied by Russia; see Russian occupation of Donetsk Oblast				
Donetsk Oblast	No. 42	Occupied by Russia; see Russian occupation of Donetsk Oblast				
Donetsk Oblast	No. 43	Occupied by Russia; see Russian occupation of Donetsk Oblast				
Donetsk Oblast	No. 44	Occupied by Russia; see Russian occupation of Donetsk Oblast				
Donetsk Oblast	No. 45	Yukhym Zvyahilsky	Opposition Bloc	1990	2019	20 February 1933 – 6 November 2021 (aged 88)
Donetsk Oblast	No. 46	Serhiy Klyuyev	Independent	2006	2019	Born 19 August 1969 (age 57)
Donetsk Oblast	No. 47	Yuriy Solod	Opposition Bloc	2014	2019	Born 27 April 1972 (age 54)
Donetsk Oblast	No. 48	Maksym Yefimov	Petro Poroshenko Bloc	2014	2019	Born 1 November 1974 (age 52)
Donetsk Oblast	No. 49	Denys Omelianovych	Independent	2012	2019	Born 17 August 1977 (age 49)
Donetsk Oblast	No. 50	Yevhen Heller	Independent	2006	2019	Born 12 May 1974 (age 52)
Donetsk Oblast	No. 51	Occupied by Russia; see Russian occupation of Donetsk Oblast				
Donetsk Oblast	No. 52	Ihor Shkiria	Independent	2002	2019	Born 20 August 1965 (age 61)
Donetsk Oblast	No. 53	Oleh Nedava	Petro Poroshenko Bloc	2014	2019	Born 26 October 1969 (age 57)
Donetsk Oblast	No. 54	Occupied by Russia; see Russian occupation of Donetsk Oblast				
Donetsk Oblast	No. 55	Occupied by Russia; see Russian occupation of Donetsk Oblast				
Donetsk Oblast	No. 56	Occupied by Russia; see Russian occupation of Donetsk Oblast				
Donetsk Oblast	No. 57	Serhiy Matiyenkov	Opposition Bloc	1998	2019	Born 8 November 1956 (age 69)
Donetsk Oblast	No. 58	Serhiy Taruta	Osnova	2014	2019	Born 23 August 1955 (age 71)
Donetsk Oblast	No. 59	Serhiy Sazhko	Opposition Bloc	2014	2019	Born 19 August 1969 (age 57)
Donetsk Oblast	No. 60	Dmytro Lubinets	Petro Poroshenko Bloc	2014	2019	Born 4 August 1981 (age 45)
Donetsk Oblast	No. 61	Occupied by Russia; see Russian occupation of Donetsk Oblast				
Zhytomyr Oblast	No. 62	Boryslav Rozenblat	Petro Poroshenko Bloc	2014	2019	Born 25 May 1969 (age 57)
Zhytomyr Oblast	No. 63	Oleksandr Reveha	Petro Poroshenko Bloc	2014	2019	Born 22 August 1966 (age 60)
Zhytomyr Oblast	No. 64	Volodymyr Areshonkov	Petro Poroshenko Bloc	2014	2019	Born 27 December 1957 (age 68)
Zhytomyr Oblast	No. 65	Volodymyr Lytvyn	Independent	2007	2019	Born 28 April 1956 (age 70)
Zhytomyr Oblast	No. 66	Pavlo Dziublyk	People's Front	2014	2019	Born 27 August 1979 (age 47)
Zhytomyr Oblast	No. 67	Viktor Razvadovsky	People's Will	2012	2019	Born 3 June 1959 (age 67)
Zakarpattia Oblast	No. 68	Robert Khorvat	Independent	2014	2019	Born 17 February 1969 (age 57)
Zakarpattia Oblast	No. 69	Viktor Baloha	Andriy Baloha's Team	2012	2019	Born 15 June 1963 (age 63)
Zakarpattia Oblast	No. 70	Mykhailo Lano	Independent	2012	2019	Born 17 November 1964 (age 61)
Zakarpattia Oblast	No. 71	Pavlo Baloha	Independent	2012	2019	Born 27 May 1977 (age 49)
Zakarpattia Oblast	No. 72	Vasyl Petiovka	Independent	2012	2019	Born 30 January 1967 (age 59)
Zakarpattia Oblast	No. 73	Ivan Baloha	Independent	2012	2019	Born 10 November 1966 (age 59)
Zaporizhzhia Oblast	No. 74	Petro Sabashuk	Petro Poroshenko Bloc	2014	2019	Born 13 August 1957 (age 69)
Zaporizhzhia Oblast	No. 75	Ihor Artiushenko	Petro Poroshenko Bloc	2014	2019	Born 21 October 1984 (age 42)
Zaporizhzhia Oblast	No. 76	Mykola Frolov	Petro Poroshenko Bloc	2014	2019	Born 9 January 1959 (age 67)
Zaporizhzhia Oblast	No. 77	Vyacheslav Boguslayev	People's Will	2006	2019	Born 28 October 1938 (age 88)
Zaporizhzhia Oblast	No. 78	Oleksandr Ponomarov	People's Will	2012	2019	Born 7 January 1962 (age 64)
Zaporizhzhia Oblast	No. 79	Volodymyr Bandurov	People's Will	2012	2019	Born 6 May 1973 (age 53)
Zaporizhzhia Oblast	No. 80	Yevgeny Balitsky	Opposition Bloc	2012	2019	Born 10 December 1969 (age 56)
Zaporizhzhia Oblast	No. 81	Serhiy Valentyrov	Petro Poroshenko Bloc	2014	2019	Born 7 August 1978 (age 48)
Zaporizhzhia Oblast	No. 82	Vadym Kryvokhatko	Petro Poroshenko Bloc	2014	2019	Born 7 January 1962 (age 64)
Ivano-Frankivsk Oblast	No. 83	Oleksandr Shevchenko	Petro Poroshenko Bloc	2014	2019	Born 8 April 1971 (age 55)
Ivano-Frankivsk Oblast	No. 84	Mykhailo Dovbenko	Petro Poroshenko Bloc	2014	2019	Born 31 October 1954 (age 72)
Ivano-Frankivsk Oblast	No. 85	Ihor Nasalyk	Petro Poroshenko Bloc	2014	2019	Born 25 November 1962 (age 63)
Ivano-Frankivsk Oblast	No. 86	Anatoliy Dyriv	People's Front	2012	2019	Born 1 February 1970 (age 56)
Ivano-Frankivsk Oblast	No. 87	Yuriy Derevyanko	Liberty	2014	2019	Born 7 May 1973 (age 53)
Ivano-Frankivsk Oblast	No. 88	Yurii Tymoshenko	People's Front	2014	2019	Born 3 April 1961 (age 65)
Ivano-Frankivsk Oblast	No. 89	Yuriy Solovey	Petro Poroshenko Bloc	2014	2019	Born 13 July 1978 (age 48)
Kyiv Oblast	No. 90	Oleksandr Marchenko	Svoboda	2014	2019	Born 14 January 1965 (age 61)
Kyiv Oblast	No. 91	Ruslan Solvar	Petro Poroshenko Bloc	2014	2019	Born 12 May 1971 (age 55)
Kyiv Oblast	No. 92	Vitaliy Hudzenko	Petro Poroshenko Bloc	2014	2019	Born 15 August 1971 (age 55)
Kyiv Oblast	No. 93	Oleksandr Onyshchenko	5.10	2012	2019	Born 1 April 1969 (age 57)
Kyiv Oblast	No. 94	Viktor Romaniuk	People's Front	2014	2019	Born 28 August 1975 (age 51)
Kyiv Oblast	No. 95	Mykhailo Havryliuk	People's Front	2014	2019	Born 15 August 1979 (age 47)
Kyiv Oblast	No. 96	Yaroslav Moskalenko	People's Will	2012	2019	Born 28 April 1975 (age 51)
Kyiv Oblast	No. 97	Pavlo Rizanenko	Petro Poroshenko Bloc	2012	2019	Born 12 July 1975 (age 51)
Kyiv Oblast	No. 98	Serhiy Mishchenko	Independent	2006	2019	Born 13 August 1971 (age 55)
Kirovohrad Oblast	No. 99	Kostiantyn Yarunin	Petro Poroshenko Bloc	2014	2019	Born 10 September 1970 (age 56)
Kirovohrad Oblast	No. 100	Stanislav Berezkin	Independent	2012	2019	Born 12 May 1959 (age 67)
Kirovohrad Oblast	No. 101	Mykhailo Poplavskyi	Independent	2014	2019	Born 28 November 1949 (age 76)
Kirovohrad Oblast	No. 102	Oles Dovhiy	Independent	2014	2019	Born 1 November 1980 (age 46)
Kirovohrad Oblast	No. 103	Anatoliy Kuzmenko	Petro Poroshenko Bloc	2014	2019	Born 29 August 1950 (age 76)
Luhansk Oblast	No. 104	Occupied by Russia; see Russian occupation of Luhansk Oblast				
Luhansk Oblast	No. 105	Occupied by Russia; see Russian occupation of Luhansk Oblast				
Luhansk Oblast	No. 106	Yevhen Bakulin	Opposition Bloc	2012	2019	Born 26 September 1956 (age 70)
Luhansk Oblast	No. 107	Serhiy Dunaiev	Opposition Bloc	2012	2019	Born 19 August 1973 (age 53)
Luhansk Oblast	No. 108	Occupied by Russia; see Russian occupation of Luhansk Oblast				
Luhansk Oblast	No. 109	Occupied by Russia; see Russian occupation of Luhansk Oblast				
Luhansk Oblast	No. 110	Occupied by Russia; see Russian occupation of Luhansk Oblast				
Luhansk Oblast	No. 111	Occupied by Russia; see Russian occupation of Luhansk Oblast				
Luhansk Oblast	No. 112	Yuliy Ioffe	Independent	2012	2019	Born 10 December 1940 (age 85)
Luhansk Oblast	No. 113	Vitalii Kurylo	Petro Poroshenko Bloc	2014	2019	Born 2 February 1957 (age 69)
Luhansk Oblast	No. 114	Yuriy Harbuz	Petro Poroshenko Bloc	2014	2016	Born 18 November 1971 (age 54)
Luhansk Oblast	No. 114	Serhii Shakhov	Our Land	2016	2019	Born 7 May 1975 (age 51)
Lviv Oblast	No. 115	Dmytro Dobrodomov	Independent	2014	2019	Born 13 January 1977 (age 49)
Lviv Oblast	No. 116	Iryna Podoliak	Self Reliance	2014	2019	Born 2 May 1967 (age 59)
Lviv Oblast	No. 117	Oksana Yurynets	Petro Poroshenko Bloc	2014	2019	Born 27 February 1978 (age 48)
Lviv Oblast	No. 118	Bohdan Dubnevych	Petro Poroshenko Bloc	2014	2019	Born 10 May 1962 (age 64)
Lviv Oblast	No. 119	Mykhailo Bondar	People's Front	2014	2019	Born 17 November 1973 (age 52)
Lviv Oblast	No. 120	Yaroslav Dubnevich	Petro Poroshenko Bloc	2012	2019	Born 7 August 1969 (age 57)
Lviv Oblast	No. 121	Bohdan Matkivskyi	Independent	2014	2019	Born 14 February 1980 (age 46)
Lviv Oblast	No. 122	Volodymyr Parasyuk	Independent	2014	2019	Born 9 July 1987 (age 39)
Lviv Oblast	No. 123	Taras Batenko	Petro Poroshenko Bloc	2014	2019	Born 20 June 1974 (age 52)
Lviv Oblast	No. 124	Oleh Musiy	Independent	2014	2019	Born 12 May 1965 (age 61)
Lviv Oblast	No. 125	Andriy Lopushanskyi	Petro Poroshenko Bloc	2014	2019	Born 4 December 1962 (age 63)
Lviv Oblast	No. 126	Andriy Kit	Petro Poroshenko Bloc	2014	2019	Born 2 November 1971 (age 55)
Mykolaiv Oblast	No. 127	Borys Kozyr	Petro Poroshenko Bloc	2014	2019	Born 6 March 1975 (age 51)
Mykolaiv Oblast	No. 128	Artem Iliuk	Independent	2012	2019	Born 17 April 1979 (age 47)
Mykolaiv Oblast	No. 129	Oleksandr Zholobetskyi	Petro Poroshenko Bloc	2014	2019	Born 24 April 1966 (age 60)
Mykolaiv Oblast	No. 130	Andriy Vadaturskyi	Petro Poroshenko Bloc	2014	2019	Born 11 April 1973 (age 53)
Mykolaiv Oblast	No. 131	Oleksandr Livik	Petro Poroshenko Bloc	2014	2019	Born 30 June 1970 (age 56)
Mykolaiv Oblast	No. 132	Arkadiy Kornatskiy	Petro Poroshenko Bloc	2014	2019	Born 7 July 1953 (age 73)
Odesa Oblast	No. 133	Eduard Matviychuk	Independent	2002	2019	Born 27 April 1963 (age 63)
Odesa Oblast	No. 134	Hennadiy Chekita	Petro Poroshenko Bloc	2014	2019	Born 17 July 1966 (age 60)
Odesa Oblast	No. 135	Serhiy Kivalov	Opposition Bloc	1998	2019	Born 1 May 1954 (age 72)
Odesa Oblast	No. 136	Dmitri Golubov	Petro Poroshenko Bloc	2014	2019	Born 16 October 1983 (age 43)
Odesa Oblast	No. 137	Leonid Klimov	Independent	2002	2019	Born 31 March 1953 (age 73)
Odesa Oblast	No. 138	Ivan Fursin	People's Will	2012	2019	Born 16 September 1971 (age 55)
Odesa Oblast	No. 139	Oleksandr Presman	Revival	2012	2019	Born 10 April 1961 (age 65)
Odesa Oblast	No. 140	Vasyl Huliaiev	Independent	2014	2019	Born 3 September 1963 (age 63)
Odesa Oblast	No. 141	Vitaly Barvinenko	Independent	2011	2019	Born 3 June 1981 (age 45)
Odesa Oblast	No. 142	Anton Kisse	Independent	2012	2019	Born 10 October 1958 (age 68)
Odesa Oblast	No. 143	Oleksandr Urbanskyi	Strong Ukraine	2014	2019	Born 3 January 1982 (age 44)
Poltava Oblast	No. 144	Serhiy Kaplin	Petro Poroshenko Bloc	2012	2019	Born 15 December 1979 (age 46)
Poltava Oblast	No. 145	Yuriy Bublyk	Svoboda	2012	2019	Born 1 December 1973 (age 52)
Poltava Oblast	No. 146	Yurii Shapovalov	Revival	2012	2019	Born 14 March 1972 (age 54)
Poltava Oblast	No. 147	Oleh Kulinich	Revival	2012	2019	Born 25 November 1966 (age 59)
Poltava Oblast	No. 148	Kostiantyn Ishcheykin	Petro Poroshenko Bloc	2014	2019	Born 11 September 1975 (age 51)
Poltava Oblast	No. 149	Andriy Reka	People's Front	2014	2019	Born 1 December 1953 (age 72)
Poltava Oblast	No. 150	Kostyantyn Zhevago	Independent	1998	2019	Born 7 January 1974 (age 52)
Poltava Oblast	No. 151	Taras Kutovy	Petro Poroshenko Bloc	2012	2016	Born 25 February 1976 (age 50)
Poltava Oblast	No. 151	Ruslan Bohdan	Batkivshchyna	2016	2019	Born 28 January 1972 (age 54)
Rivne Oblast	No. 152	Oleh Osukhovskyi	Svoboda	2012	2019	Born 18 June 1978 (age 48)
Rivne Oblast	No. 153	Yuriy Vozniuk	People's Front	2012	2019	Born 31 January 1980 (age 46)
Rivne Oblast	No. 154	Oleksandr Dekhtiarchuk	Petro Poroshenko Bloc	2014	2019	Born 17 August 1971 (age 55)
Rivne Oblast	No. 155	Vasyl Yanitskyi	Petro Poroshenko Bloc	2014	2019	Born 14 January 1973 (age 53)
Rivne Oblast	No. 156	Serhiy Yevtushok	Batkivshchyna	2014	2019	Born 13 November 1973 (age 52)
Sumy Oblast	No. 157	Oleh Medunytsia	People's Front	2012	2019	Born 27 August 1971 (age 55)
Sumy Oblast	No. 158	Oleksandr Suhoniako	Petro Poroshenko Bloc	2014	2019	Born 8 January 1958 (age 68)
Sumy Oblast	No. 159	Andrii Derkach	Independent	2007	2019	Born 19 August 1967 (age 59)
Sumy Oblast	No. 160	Ihor Molotok	People's Will	2012	2019	Born 4 September 1967 (age 59)
Sumy Oblast	No. 161	Mykola Lavryk	Petro Poroshenko Bloc	2014	2019	Born 30 June 1952 (age 74)
Sumy Oblast	No. 162	Vladyslav Bukhariev	Batkivshchyna	2014	2019	Born 14 March 1969 (age 57)
Ternopil Oblast	No. 163	Taras Pastukh	Independent	2014	2019	Born 20 March 1978 (age 48)
Ternopil Oblast	No. 164	Mykhailo Holovko	Svoboda	2012	2019	Born 3 May 1983 (age 43)
Ternopil Oblast	No. 165	Taras Yuryk	Petro Poroshenko Bloc	2014	2019	Born 9 December 1980 (age 45)
Ternopil Oblast	No. 166	Mykola Liushniak	Petro Poroshenko Bloc	2014	2019	Born 8 February 1974 (age 52)
Ternopil Oblast	No. 167	Oleh Barna	Petro Poroshenko Bloc	2014	2019	18 April 1967 – 17 April 2023 (aged 55)
Kharkiv Oblast	No. 168	Valeriy Pysarenko	Revival	2006	2019	Born 8 August 1980 (age 46)
Kharkiv Oblast	No. 169	Oleksandr Kirsh	People's Front	2014	2019	Born 24 September 1961 (age 65)
Kharkiv Oblast	No. 170	Dmytro Svyatash	Revival	2002	2019	Born 15 June 1971 (age 55)
Kharkiv Oblast	No. 171	Vitaliy Khomutynnik	Revival	2002	2019	Born 4 August 1976 (age 50)
Kharkiv Oblast	No. 172	Volodymyr Mysyk	People's Will	2012	2019	Born 31 January 1965 (age 61)
Kharkiv Oblast	No. 173	Anatoliy Denysenko	Independent	2012	2019	Born 10 March 1971 (age 55)
Kharkiv Oblast	No. 174	Oleksandr Feldman	People's Will	2012	2019	Born 6 January 1960 (age 66)
Kharkiv Oblast	No. 175	Volodymyr Katsuba	Independent	2012	2019	Born 14 August 1957 (age 69)
Kharkiv Oblast	No. 176	Dmytro Shentsev	Opposition Bloc	2012	2019	Born 28 November 1964 (age 61)
Kharkiv Oblast	No. 177	Viktor Ostapchuk	Revival	2012	2019	Born 16 May 1955 (age 71)
Kharkiv Oblast	No. 178	Dmytro Dobkin	Opposition Bloc	2012	2019	Born 8 January 1975 (age 51)
Kharkiv Oblast	No. 179	Anatoliy Hirshfeld	Independent	2012	2019	Born 7 August 1947 (age 79)
Kharkiv Oblast	No. 180	Oleksandr Bilovol	Independent	2002	2019	Born 11 January 1962 (age 64)
Kharkiv Oblast	No. 181	Yevhen Murayev	Independent	2012	2019	Born 2 December 1976 (age 49)
Kherson Oblast	No. 182	Oleksandr Spivakovskyi	Petro Poroshenko Bloc	2014	2019	Born 28 March 1957 (age 69)
Kherson Oblast	No. 183	Andrii Gordieiev	Petro Poroshenko Bloc	2014	2016	Born 13 June 1983 (age 43)
Kherson Oblast	No. 183	Yuriy Odarchenko	Batkivshchyna	2016	2019	Born 5 April 1960 (age 66)
Kherson Oblast	No. 184	Ivan Vinnyk	Petro Poroshenko Bloc	2014	2019	Born 3 January 1979 (age 47)
Kherson Oblast	No. 185	Serhiy Khlan	Petro Poroshenko Bloc	2014	2019	Born 29 June 1972 (age 54)
Kherson Oblast	No. 186	Fedir Nehoi	Independent	2012	2019	Born 9 March 1958 (age 68)
Khmelnytskyi Oblast	No. 187	Serhiy Melnyk	Petro Poroshenko Bloc	2014	2019	Born 22 February 1965 (age 61)
Khmelnytskyi Oblast	No. 188	Serhiy Labaziuk	People's Will	2012	2019	Born 4 June 1980 (age 46)
Khmelnytskyi Oblast	No. 189	Andriy Shynkovych	Petro Poroshenko Bloc	2014	2019	Born 12 March 1976 (age 50)
Khmelnytskyi Oblast	No. 190	Roman Matsola	Petro Poroshenko Bloc	2014	2019	Born 11 August 1974 (age 52)
Khmelnytskyi Oblast	No. 191	Viktor Bondar	Revival	2012	2019	Born 5 November 1975 (age 50)
Khmelnytskyi Oblast	No. 192	Oleksandr Hereha	Independent	2012	2019	Born 27 June 1967 (age 59)
Khmelnytskyi Oblast	No. 193	Volodymyr Melnychenko	Petro Poroshenko Bloc	2014	2019	Born 1 February 1965 (age 61)
Cherkasy Oblast	No. 194	Oleh Petrenko	Petro Poroshenko Bloc	2014	2019	Born 17 September 1973 (age 53)
Cherkasy Oblast	No. 195	Volodymyr Zubyk	Independent	2006	2019	Born 28 February 1958 (age 68)
Cherkasy Oblast	No. 196	Hennadiy Bobov	Revival	2012	2019	Born 15 November 1965 (age 60)
Cherkasy Oblast	No. 197	Vladyslav Holub	Petro Poroshenko Bloc	2014	2019	Born 22 April 1983 (age 43)
Cherkasy Oblast	No. 198	Serhii Rudyk	Petro Poroshenko Bloc	2014	2019	Born 11 October 1970 (age 56)
Cherkasy Oblast	No. 199	Valentyn Nychyporenko	Independent	2012	2019	Born 25 February 1961 (age 65)
Cherkasy Oblast	No. 200	Anton Yatsenko	Independent	2007	2019	Born 13 July 1977 (age 49)
Chernivtsi Oblast	No. 201	Mykola Fedoruk	People's Front	2012	2019	Born 20 March 1954 (age 72)
Chernivtsi Oblast	No. 202	Ivan Rybak	Petro Poroshenko Bloc	2014	2019	Born 11 March 1978 (age 48)
Chernivtsi Oblast	No. 203	Hryhoriy Timish	Petro Poroshenko Bloc	2014	2019	Born 11 December 1970 (age 55)
Chernivtsi Oblast	No. 204	Maksym Burbak	People's Front	2012	2019	Born 27 June 1971 (age 55)
Chernihiv Oblast	No. 205	Valeriy Kulich	Petro Poroshenko Bloc	2014	2015	Born 28 August 1973 (age 53)
Chernihiv Oblast	No. 205	Serhiy Berezenko	Petro Poroshenko Bloc	2015	2019	Born 11 April 1984 (age 42)
Chernihiv Oblast	No. 206	Vladyslav Atroshenko	Petro Poroshenko Bloc	2012	2016	Born 5 December 1968 (age 57)
Chernihiv Oblast	No. 206	Maksym Mykytas	People's Will	2016	2019	Born 13 June 1980 (age 46)
Chernihiv Oblast	No. 207	Anatoliy Yevlakhov	Petro Poroshenko Bloc	2014	2019	Born 14 April 1981 (age 45)
Chernihiv Oblast	No. 208	Valeriy Davydenko	Zastup	2014	2019	16 March 1973 – 23 May 2020 (aged 47)
Chernihiv Oblast	No. 209	Oleksandr Kodola	People's Front	2014	2019	Born 17 February 1982 (age 44)
Chernihiv Oblast	No. 210	Oleh Dmytrenko	Petro Poroshenko Bloc	2014	2019	Born 17 October 1973 (age 53)
Kyiv	No. 211	Yevhen Rybchynskyi	Petro Poroshenko Bloc	2014	2019	Born 21 December 1969 (age 56)
Kyiv	No. 212	Vitaliy Stashuk	People's Front	2014	2019	Born 15 October 1972 (age 54)
Kyiv	No. 213	Boryslav Bereza	Independent	2014	2019	Born 13 June 1974 (age 52)
Kyiv	No. 214	Viktor Chumak	Petro Poroshenko Bloc	2012	2019	Born 5 June 1958 (age 68)
Kyiv	No. 215	Andriy Illienko	Svoboda	2012	2019	Born 24 June 1987 (age 39)
Kyiv	No. 216	Oleksandr Suprunenko	Independent	2014	2019	Born 31 January 1971 (age 55)
Kyiv	No. 217	Andriy Biletsky	Independent	2014	2019	Born 8 May 1979 (age 47)
Kyiv	No. 218	Volodymyr Ariev	Petro Poroshenko Bloc	2007	2019	Born 31 March 1975 (age 51)
Kyiv	No. 219	Oleksandr Tretiakov	Petro Poroshenko Bloc	2002	2019	Born 20 March 1970 (age 56)
Kyiv	No. 220	Vyacheslav Konstantinovsky	People's Front	2014	2019	Born 11 November 1960 (age 65)
Kyiv	No. 221	Leonid Yemets	People's Front	2012	2019	Born 30 August 1979 (age 47)
Kyiv	No. 222	Dmytro Andriyevskyi	Petro Poroshenko Bloc	2012	2019	Born 6 January 1967 (age 59)
Kyiv	No. 223	Yuriy Levchenko	Svoboda	2014	2019	Born 1 October 1984 (age 42)
Sevastopol	No. 224	Occupied by Russia; see Annexation of Crimea by the Russian Federation				
Sevastopol	No. 225	Occupied by Russia; see Annexation of Crimea by the Russian Federation				

== Parliamentary factions and deputy groups summary ==
Bold indicates majority caucus.

	(Shading indicates majority caucus)									Total	Vacant
	Petro Poroshenko Bloc	People's Front	Opposition Bloc	Self Reliance	Radical Party	Fatherland	Revival (Note: Revival was briefly called Economic Development in 2014. It was also a parliamentary group like People's Will until 2015.)	People's Will (Note: People's Will is a parliamentary group. Parliamentary groups consist of non-partisan deputies or representatives of parties that did not overcome election threshold (i.e. Svoboda, Strong Ukraine, etc.).) (Note: The People's Will deputy group in previous convocation was known as Sovereign European Ukraine.)	Non-affiliated (Note: Parties that did not pass the 5% threshold of the 2014 Ukrainian parliamentary election, Svoboda (7 seats), Right Sector (1 seat), Strong Ukraine (1 seat), Volia (1 seat), and Zastup (1 seat) are part of non-affiliated. After the 17 July 2016 constituency mid-term elections the parties UKROP and Our Land joined them.)	Total	Vacant
End of previous convocation	DNP (Note: 30% of the Petro Poroshenko Bloc election list was filled by members of the Ukrainian Democratic Alliance for Reform (UDAR), which did not participate in the 2014 election independently. UDAR participated in the 2012 election, consisting of a faction of 41 deputies in the previous convocation.)	DNP (Note: People's Front is a September 2014 split off from Fatherland; many current members of the People's Front were members of the Fatherland faction of the previous convocation.)	DNP (Note: The Opposition Bloc consists mainly of former members of former President Yanukovych's Party of Regions, which formed the largest caucus after the 2012 election with 185 deputies, although after the removal of Yanukovych and the 2014 Ukrainian revolution, the caucus consisted of only 78 members.)	DNP	1	**86**	41	35	93	445	5
Seats won in 2014 election	**132**	82	29	33	22	19	DNP	DNP	96	423	27
November 27, 2014 (first session)	**145**	83	40	32	22	19	19	20	38	418	32
December 2, 2014	**147**	83	40	32	22	19	19	20	38	420	30
February 5, 2015	**150**	82	40	31	21	19	19	18	42	422	28
June 24, 2015	**144**	81	43	31	21	19	22	19	42	422	28
October 22, 2015	**142**	81	43	26	21	19	22	20	48	422	28
February 13, 2016	**136**	81	43	26	21	19	23	20	53	422	28
April 11, 2016	**141**	81	43	26	21	19	23	20	47	422	28
April 12, 2016	**145** (Note: The addition of these four deputies made it possible for Petro Poroshenko Bloc and People's Front to form a government without additional parties.)	81	43	26	21	19	23	19	44	422	28
July 19, 2016	**142**	81	43	26	21	19	23	19	42	422	28
September 21, 2016	**143**	81	43	26	21	21	23	19	46	422	28
December 23, 2016	**142**	81	43	26	21	20	24	18	48	422	28
September 10, 2017	**138**	81	43	26	21	20	20	17	51	422	28
July 31, 2017	**135**	81	43	25	21	20	24	19	55	422	28
November 22, 2018	**135**	81	38	25	21	20	24	19	60	422	28
Latest voting share	**32.7%**	19.2%	10.2%	6.2%	4.7%	4.7%	6.2%	4.0%	12.1%	93.8%	6.2%

== Coalition ==
On November 21, 2014, the Petro Poroshenko Bloc, People's Front, Self Reliance, Fatherland, and Radical Party signed a coalition agreement. The coalition consists of a total of 302 deputies, which is more than the constitutional majority required by the constitution. The coalition agreement prioritized several key points, namely:

- foundation of a national police force within a reformed Ministry of Internal Affairs
- integration of Ukraine into the European Union, and implementing all points of the Association Agreement
- revocation of Ukraine's neutral country status, and pursuing membership in NATO
- abolishment of parliamentary immunity, while approving a reformed impeachment process
- establishment of the Anti-Corruption Bureau and the National Agency Against Corruption
- reformation of the Ukrzaliznytsia state railroad company
- privatizing the coal mines
- adoption of additional tax cuts
- decentralization of the administrative divisions
- conduction of mayoral elections in cities with two rounds, alongside lowering the number of deputies in local councils
- reformation of the electoral system based on proportional representation with open party lists
- reintegration of Crimea under Ukrainian control and submission of an international claim for reparations against Russia for the Crimean occupation and annexation
- establishment of permanent Ukrainian armed forces locations in the east, while allocating at least 3 percent of the GDP for defense spending
- implementation of decommunization and prohibition of Soviet and Nazi symbols and propaganda

Meanwhile, the parliamentary opposition consists of the Opposition Bloc faction, People's Will, and Revival. The Opposition Bloc represents politicians from the Party of Regions, which formed the Second Azarov Government and the majority caucus in parliament after the 2012 elections.

On May 17, 2019, People's Front exited the ruling coalition in order to prevent the incoming President from dissolving the parliament ahead of schedule.

== Committees ==
On December 4, 2014, the Verkhovna Rada approved the composition of its 27 committees and one special control commission. On 11 December 2014, parliament voted in favor of recalling all of the deputies who voted for the January 16 "dictatorship laws" of the previous convocation from their positions in committee leadership. Deputy Chairman Oksana Syroyid proposed this measure, which was adopted with 264 votes in favor.

Numbers in parentheses indicate the number of deputies in each committee and the special control commission

- Committee on taxation and customs policy (33)
- Committee on agrarian policy and land relations (30)
- Committee on legal policy and justice (32)
- Committee on budget (27)
- Committee on fuel and energy complex, nuclear policy, and nuclear safety (23)
- Committee on preventing and combating corruption (22)
- Committee on national security and defense (20)
- Committee on transport (20)
- Committee on legislative support of law enforcement (19)
- Committee on state construction, regional policy, and local government (17)
- Committee on economic policy (15)
- Committee on ecological policy, natural resources, and elimination of the consequences of the Chornobyl Catastrophe (15)
- Committee on European Integration (14)
- Committee on financial policy and banking (13)
- Committee on construction, housing and communal services (11)
- Committee on health (11)
- Committee on freedom of speech and information policy (10)
- Committee on foreign affairs (10)
- Committee on industrial policy and entrepreneurship (10)
- Committee on rules and organization of the Verkhovna Rada of Ukraine (10)
- Committee on information and communication (9)
- Committee on veterans and the disabled (9)
- Committee on human rights, national minorities, and international relations (8)
- Committee on social policy, employment and pensions (8)
- Committee on culture and spirituality (7)
- Committee on science and education (7)
- Committee on family, youth and sports (6)
- Special Control Commission of the Verkhovna Rada of Ukraine on privatization (1)

== Calls for reform ==
On 11 December 2014, the Yatsenyuk Government presented its course of action for the following year. It was proposed that the number of deputies in parliament be decreased to 150. According to estimates, adopting such a constitutional amendment would save ₴424 million annually (approx. US$26 million). As part of a separate reform effort, the governing coalition proposed removing parliamentary immunity for deputies.

In the Verkhovna Rada, impersonal voting (referred to as button pushing, from the Ukrainian: "кнопкодавство") has been a serious problem in parliament for many years. The deputies of the 2014's convocation to vote impersonally have already been recognized less than a week into parliament's first session. Members of the nationalist Svoboda political party, which was elected into the parliament's previous convocation, proposed making deputies criminally liable for impersonating voters and banning them from holding any future parliamentary mandates. Additionally, members of the coalition's Petro Poroshenko Bloc have also recognized the need to ban impersonal voting.
