= Sidorowicz =

Derived from the given name Sidor (Isidore). Russian equivalent: Sidorovich, Belarusian: Sidarovich, Ukrainian: Sydorovych. (In East Slavic names, "Sidorovich", etc. is also a patronymic part of the full name.)

- Władysław Sidorowicz
- Natalia Sidorowicz
- Roman Sidorowicz
