= Ivchenko =

Ivchenko is a Ukrainian surname. Notable people with the surname include:

- Aleksandr Ivchenko (born 1952), Russian football coach
- Borys Ivchenko
- Dmitry Ivchenko
- Oleksandr Ivchenko (1903–1968), Ukrainian aircraft engine designer
- Vadym Ivchenko
- Viktor Ivchenko
- Yevgeniy Ivchenko
