= Serhiy Kiral =

Ukrainian politician

Serhiy Kiral Сергій Кіраль
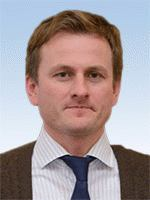
- In office November 27, 2014 – August 29, 2019

Personal details
- Born: March 21, 1975 (age 51) Sokal, Lviv Oblast, Ukraine
- Party: Samopomich Union
- Education: Lviv State I. Franko University

Serhiy Ivanovych Kiral (Ukrainian: Сергій Іванович Кіраль; born March 21, 1975) is a Ukrainian politician, Member of Parliament of Ukraine of 8th convocation from Samopomich Union and former Head of the Department for International Economy and Investments on Lviv City Council.

Kiral again took part in the July 2019 Ukrainian parliamentary election for Samopomich on its national election list. But in the election the party won 1 seat (in one of the electoral constituencies) while only scoring 0.62% of the national (election list) vote.

== Biography ==
Serhiy Kiral was born in Ukrainian town Sokal, Lviv Oblast and attended local School#3 with specialisation in English language, which he graduated with honours in 1992. The same year he enrolled into Lviv State I. Franko University, the faculty of English Language and Literature, which he graduated in 1997 with Specialist degree.

In 2002 he received an MBA from Lviv Management School, specialising in international business, finance and management of organisations. As a part of learning experience, Kiral attended courses abroad in Spain, and Canada (University of Western Ontario). Starting career as an interpreter, in 2002 Kiral decided to launch the business in consulting.

Kiral was Head of the Department for International Economy and Investments on Lviv City Council.

He is fluent in English and Polish, and has basic knowledge of Spanish and French. Kiral is married and has three children.
