= Tetiana Ostrikova =

Ukrainian politician and lawyer

Tetiana Ostrikova Тетяна Острікова
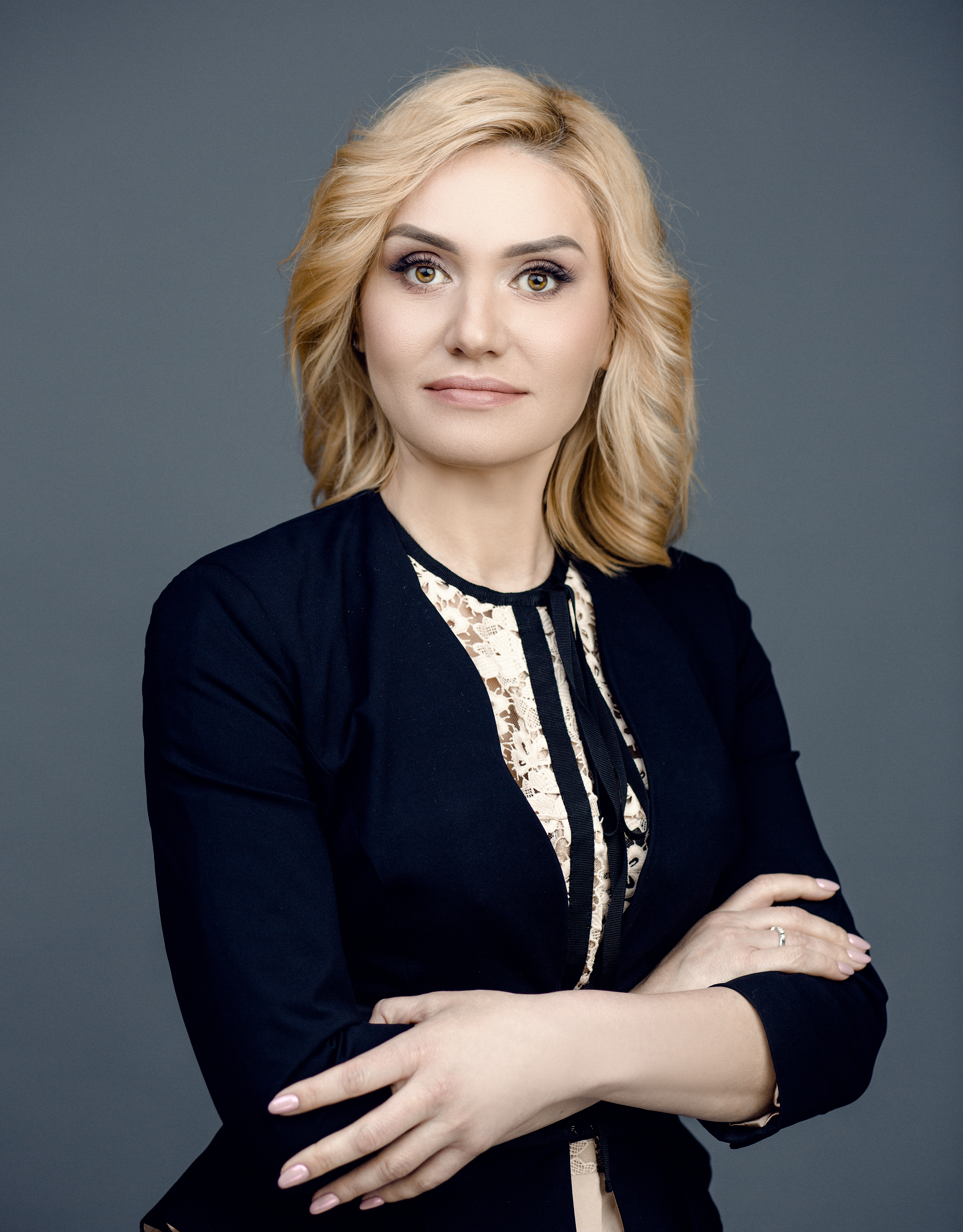
- Tetiana Ostrikova, April 2018
- In office 27 November 2014 – 29 August 2019

Personal details
- Born: 22 January 1979 (age 47) Rivne, Ukraine
- Party: Samopomich Union
- Education: National University of Kyiv Mohyla Academy

Tetiana Heorhiyivna Ostrikova (Ukrainian: Тетяна Георгіївна Острікова, born 22 January 1979) is a Ukrainian politician and lawyer. She is a for member of parliament of Ukraine of the 8th convocation. Member of the parliamentary faction Samopomich Union. Member of the Intra-faction Deputies Union 'Deputy Control' and the Ukraine National Association of Lawyers.

== Biography ==
Tetiana Ostrikova was born in Rivne, Ukraine. She attended school No. 15 with specialisation in English, which she graduated in 1996. In 1996–1997, Ostrikova was studying at the Preparation department at the University of Ljubljana (Slovenia). In 1997–2002 she studied at the National University of Kyiv Mohyla Academy, where she obtained the Specialist degree in Law. In 2002–2007, she was working as Assistant professor and then Professor at the Department of Sectoral Law Studies, Faculty of Law at the National University of Kyiv Mohyla Academy.

In 2003–2009, she has been working as lawyer at Investment-Consulting Company Universal-Contact, Attorney Union Volkov and Partners. Since 2009 was the head of Unico-Estate, a real estate company. Ostrikova is married and a mother to two sons.

Ostrikova is a co-hosts on the talk show "By and large" on "24 Channel".

Ostrikova again took part in the July 2019 Ukrainian parliamentary election for Self Reliance on its national election list. But in the election the party won 1 seat (in one of the electoral constituencies) while only scoring 0.62% of the national (election list) vote.
