= Oleh Bereziuk =

Ukrainian politician

- Олег Березюк
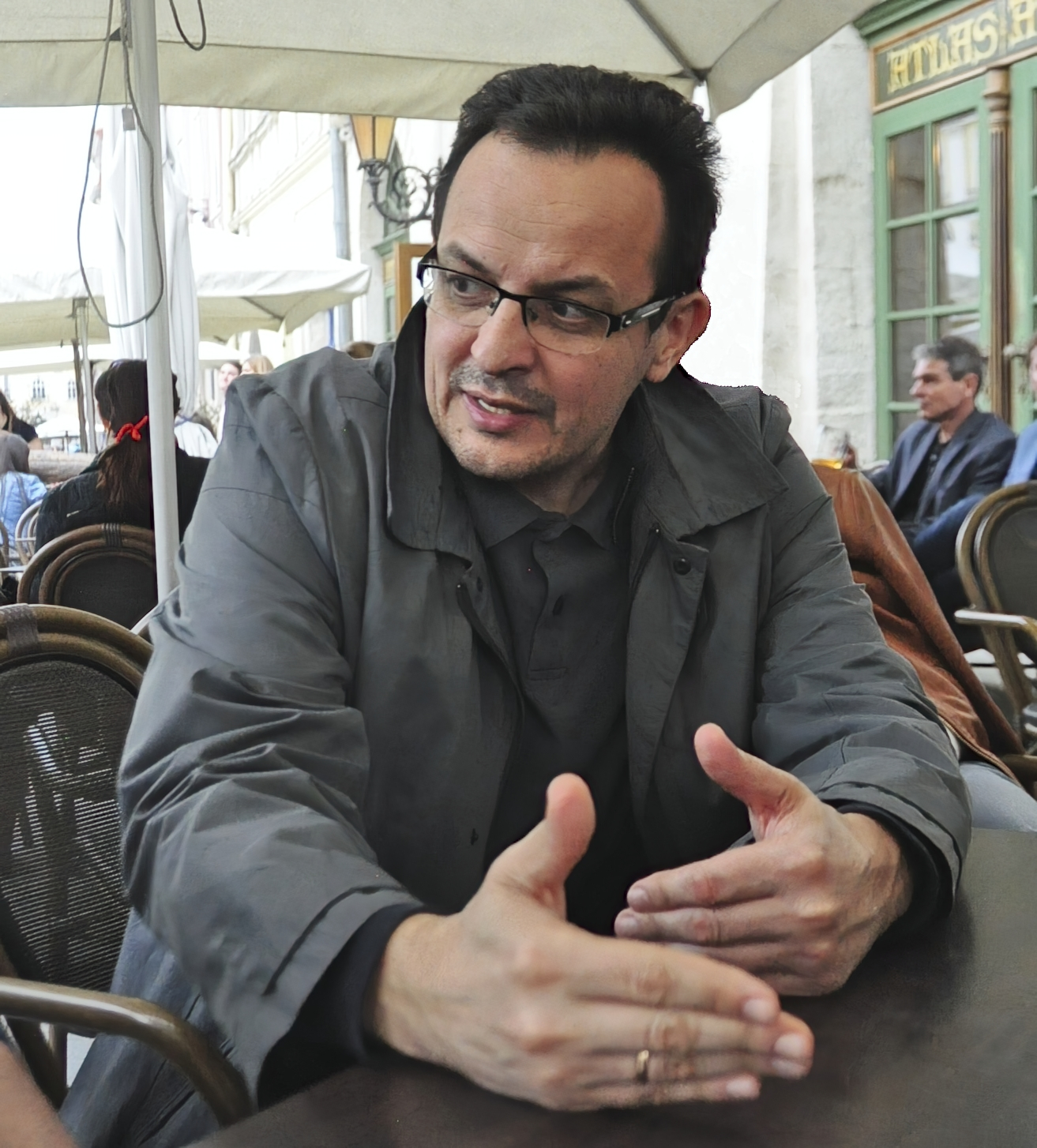

People's Deputy of Ukraine

8th convocation
- In office November 27, 2014 – August 29, 2019
- Constituency: Self Reliance, No.28

Personal details
- Born: 8 October 1969 (age 56) Lviv, Ukrainian SSR, USSR
- Party: Self Reliance

Bereziuk Oleh Romanovych (Ukrainian: Олег Романович Березюк, born October 8, 1969, in Lviv) is a Ukrainian politician, Member of the Parliament of Ukraine of 8th convocation where he chaired the Parliamentary faction of Samopomich Union, Member of the Ukrainian Association of Psychotherapists. He failed to win reelection for his party in the 2019 Ukrainian parliamentary election.

== Biography ==
Oleh Bereziuk was born in Lviv. In 1986-1988 attended Lviv Basic Medical College. In 1988 he entered the faculty of Treatment in Lviv Medical University, from where he graduated with honours in 1999. In 1991-1996 studied biology and psychology in the University of Illinois, having graduated with honours and golden medal.

In 2000-2006 Bereziuk worked as psychiatrist. Since 2000 he held the position of Assistant at the Department of Psychiatric and Psychotherapy in Lviv National Medical University named after Danylo of Halych. In 1996-2006 he was the author and host of the psychological discussions program 'Let's Talk' on the Lux FM radio station.

From September 2006 and until November 2014 Bereziuk worked in the Lviv City Council, in 2007-2012 he was the Head of the Mayor Administration Department. Starting September 2012, he worked as a Director of the Department of Humanitarian Politics at the Lviv City Council, and acting Deputy Mayor of Lviv for Humanitarian Issues.

Bereziuk was one of the founders of the NGO Samopomich in 2004, and political party Self Reliance in 2012.

Representing Self Reliance, he was elected to the Verkhovna Rada during the Ukrainian parliamentary election in October 2014.

Bereziuk again took part in the July 2019 Ukrainian parliamentary election for Self Reliance on its national election list. But in the election the party won 1 seat (in one of the electoral constituencies) while only scoring 0.62% of the national (election list) vote.

Married to Uliana Krynytsyna-Bereziuk, with whom he has three children.
