= Ihor Didenko =

Ukrainian politician

Ihor Anatoliyovych Didenko
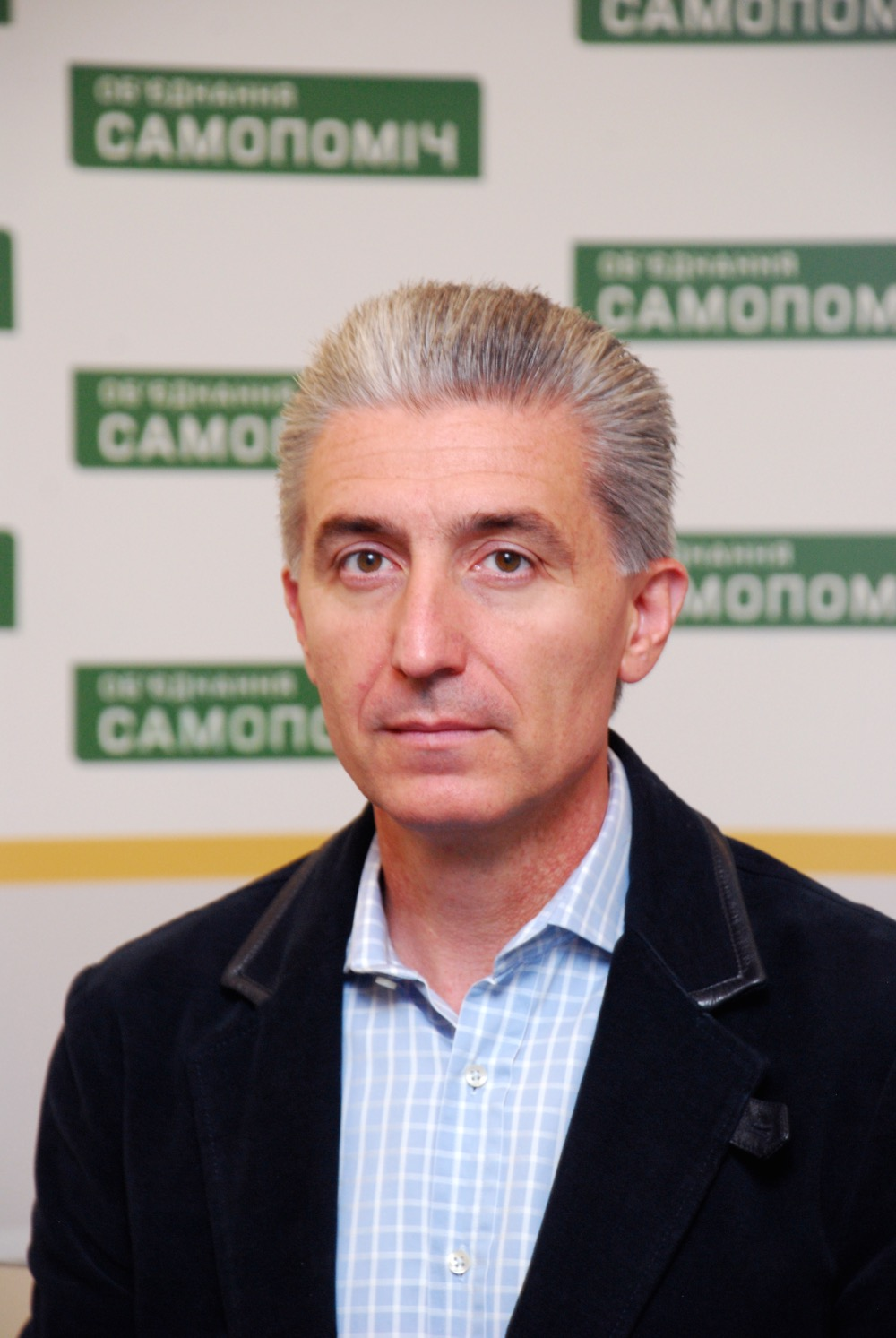
- In office 27 November 2014 – 29 August 2019

Personal details
- Born: February 8, 1967 (age 59) Bila Tserkva, Ukrainian SSR, Soviet Union (now Ukraine)
- Party: Samopomich
- Education: Kyiv Polytechnic Institute
- Profession: lawmaker

Ihor Anatoliyovych Didenko (born 8 February 1967) is a Ukrainian politician, People's Deputy of Ukraine of the 8th Convocation, member of the parliamentary faction Self Reliance.

Didenko again took part in the July 2019 Ukrainian parliamentary election for Samopomich on its national election list. But in the election the party won 1 seat (in one of the electoral constituencies) while only scoring 0.62% of the national (election list) vote.

== Biography ==
Ihor Didenko was born in town Bila Tserkva, Kyiv Oblast. He studied in the city school number 17. In 1984-1993 Didenko was a student of Kyiv Polytechnic Institute, in the faculty of Device Construction. In 1991 he became an intern with the Department of Enterprise Management in University of Valencia, Spain.

In 1995, he became the director of the magazine Auto Photo Trade. In 1996 Didenko founded the magazine Autocentre. Since 1997 has been publishing the weekly Autobazar. In 2003 he started publishing licensed German and British magazines Auto Bild, T3, Digital Foto Camera.

In 2008 Didenko founded the TV channel First Automobile. Since 2010 has been the president of the Autocenter Media-Group, which included magazines Autocenter, Autobazar, Auto Bild, Motor News, Commercial Automobiles and the TV channel First Automobile.

Didenko is supporting transparent competition in the Ukrainian automobile market for the support of which in 1999 he launched nationwide event Ukraine's Car of the Year and Ukraine's Best Driver. Didenko has worked with the Ukrainian Association of Press Publishers, and the World Newspaper Congress.
