= Olha Chervakova =

Ukrainian journalist and politician

- Ольга Червакова
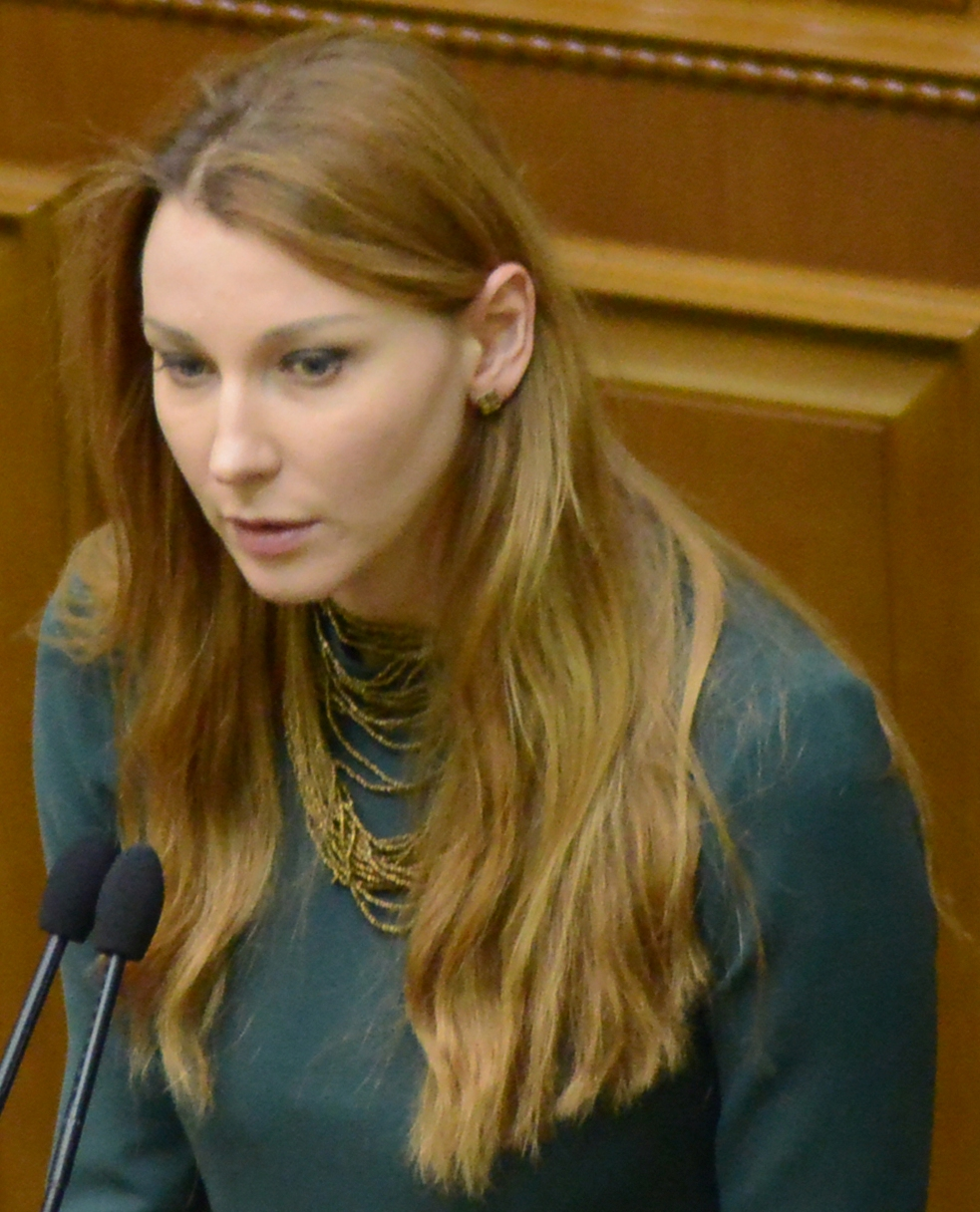
- Chervakova in 2015

People's Deputy of Ukraine

8th convocation
- In office 27 November 2014 – 29 August 2019

Personal details
- Born: 6 April 1975 (age 51) Dnipropetrovsk, Ukrainian SSR, Soviet Union
- Party: Petro Poroshenko Bloc
- Education: Oles Honchar Dnipro National University

Olha Valeriyivna Chervakova (Ukrainian: Ольга Валеріївна Червакова; born 6 April 1975) is a Ukrainian journalist and politician, who served as a People's Deputy of Ukraine in the eighth convocation.

== Journalistic career ==
While studying at Oles Honchar Dnipro National University, Chervakova worked at the Dnepropetrovsk radio station "Mriya", on the local television channels OGTRK and Channel 34, and the newspapers "Business Vremya" and "Dneprovskaya Pravda". From 1997 to 1998, she worked as a journalist, and from 1998 to 2000 as editor of the news department of the Vostok-Center TV channel. In 2001, Chervakova was a special correspondent for the Dnepropetrovskaya Pravda newspaper. From 2001 to 2002, she was the editor of the information department of CJSC Diorama. She began working in Kyiv in 2001 as an editor in the information department of ZAO Diorama. From 2002 to 2003, she worked as a special correspondent for the National Television Company of Ukraine.

From 2003 to 2013, Chervakova worked as a parliamentary correspondent for the STB television channel, which she left due to disagreement with the news editorial policy aimed at covering "black-ish" topics. In June 2013, she became a news correspondent for the Inter TV channel, but at the end of 2013 she left the channel. Only in March 2014 did she return to Inter, becoming the editor-in-chief of "Details of the Week".

In 1998, Chervakova became a member of the National Union of Journalists of Ukraine. From 2008 to 2011, she was a member and chairman of the primary cell of the Mediafront trade union.

== Political career ==
In the 2014 parliamentary elections, Chervakova was elected to the Verkhovna Rada (Ukrainian parliament) representing the Petro Poroshenko Bloc in position 49, but remained non-partisan. She was the first deputy chairperson of the Verkhovna Rada Committee on Freedom of Speech and Information Policy.
