= Liubomyr Zubach =

Ukrainian politician and lawyer

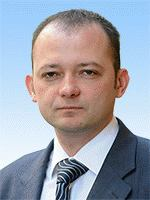
- Incumbent
- Assumed office 27 November 2014

Personal details
- Born: 21 January 1978 (age 48) Lviv
- Party: Samopomich Union
- Education: Lviv National University

Liubomyr Lvovych Zubach (born January 21, 1978) is a Ukrainian politician and lawyer, Member of Parliament of the 8th convocation, member of the Parliamentary faction Samopomich Union.

== Biography ==
Liubomyr Zubach was born in Western Ukraine city of Lviv. He studied at School#28, specialising in German. Zubach graduated with bachelor's degree in law from Lviv National I. Franko University in 1999. In 2011 he graduated with Masters in Public Administration from the Lviv Regional Institute of the President of Ukraine National Academy of Public Administration.

Zubach started working as a law consultant in 1999, at the shoe factory Malvy Enterprise LTD. In 2000–2002 he was the assistant lawyer at the Advocate Company Pavlenko, Stetsenko & Osinchuk. In 2002 he started working at the Institute of City Development. He also worked as a counsellor for CEO of the Pivdenzahidelektromerezhbud (2003–2004), and member of the board for Teleradiocompany Luks (2005–2006). In 2006 Zubach started cooperating with Lviv City Council, volunteering as a counsellor the mayor. Later he became the deputy head of the Department of the Council Secretariat, in 2007 he became the head of the department.

Zubach has been involved in civic activism since his student years, participating in the movement 'Youth for Reforms' as a member of its managing board. In 2004 he co-founded and participated in NGO Samopomich.

Zubach is a member of the Association of Media Lawyers in Lviv Region and the Centre for Law Development. He is a member of the Samopomich Union political party and is in its executive committee.
