= Maksym Polyakov =

Ukrainian politician (born 1982)

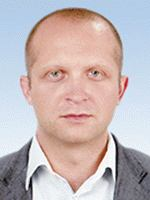
Official Verkhovna Rada portrait, 2014

Maksym Anatoliyovych Polyakov (Ukrainian: Максим Анатолійович Поляков; born April 23, 1982) is a Ukrainian politician, economist and public figure. Polyakov served on Uman City Council as Deputy Mayor for Economic Activities from 2011 to 2012. He is the head of the Uman Center Political Party's section Front for Change. He also heads the Bridge youth organization and Green world. He is the co-founder of the Uman International Economic Forum. Since March 12, 2014 - Member of the National Commission for the State Regulation of Financial Services.

Polyakov is suspected of receiving a $7,500 bribe through dealing with illegal amber and since August 2017 has been imprisoned awaiting trial.

== Early life ==
Maksym Anatoliyovych Polyakov was born in Uman (then part of the Soviet Union). After leaving school, Polyakov enrolled as an economics student in the Uman State Pedagogical University named after Pavlo Tychyna. He graduated from the university in 2004, and later continued his postgraduate studies.

== Career ==
After working for several private companies from 2006 to 2010, including Impexagro and KwadroAutoGroup, he taught economics at the Uman affiliate of the European University and at the Uman State Pedagogical University.

He became head of the Uman Center Public Organisation Front for Change and its sister political party in 2009 and 2010 respectively. On 15 June 2013 his Front for Change (party) merged into "Fatherland".

He also helmed a study on the Scientific and methodological principles of socio-economic development of the Cherkasy region.

In the October 2014 Ukrainian parliamentary election Polyakov was elected into parliament placed 39th on the electoral list of People's Front.

Polyakov is suspected of receiving a $7,500 bribe through dealing with illegal amber. His parliamentary immunity was lifted by the Ukrainian parliament on 11 July 2017. Polyakov has been imprisoned since August 2017 awaiting trial.
