= Anna Romanova =

Ukrainian politician

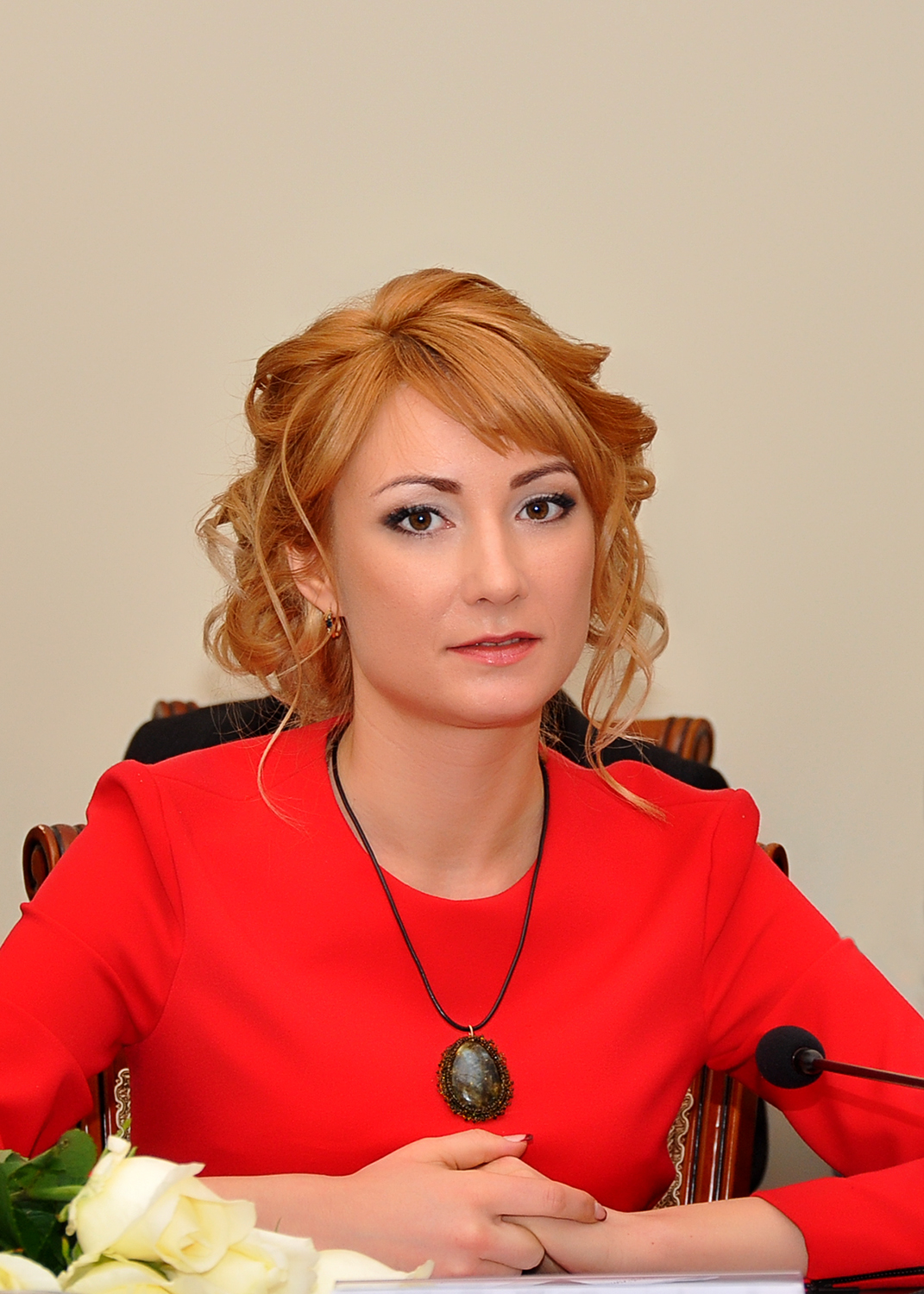
- Romanova in February 2015

Member of the Verkhovna Rada
- In office 27 November 2014 – 29 August 2019

Personal details
- Born: 21 February 1985 (age 41) Chernihiv, Ukraine, Soviet Union
- Party: Samopomich Union

Anna Anatoliyivna Romanova (born 21 February 1985) is a Ukrainian politician, former Member of the Ukrainian Parliament, former member of the parliamentary faction Samopomich Union. She is former deputy mayor of Chernihiv. Anna Romanova is an Executive Director of the Association of Hospitality Industry of Ukraine tourism and hospitality expert

In the 2019 Ukrainian parliamentary election she was #21 on the election ballot of Samopomich. But in the election the party did get not enough votes to clear the 5% election threshold and thus won no parliamentary seats.

== Biography ==
Romanova was born in Chernihiv. She attended high school in Chernihiv, before enrolling in the Taras Shevchenko Chernihiv State Pedagogic University, which she graduated in 2006, with a degree in History and Social Politics. In 2009 she received a degree in Organization Management from Chernihiv State Technologic University. In 2014 she finished the course of studies at the President of Ukraine's National Academy of State Administration, obtaining a degree in Social Development Administration.

Additionally, Romanova studied at the leadership school ASPEN-Ukraine and the Ukrainian School of Political Studies (USPS). In 2014 Romanova completed PhD studies on city development regulations. She is an expert in territorial branding and increasing competitiveness of the territories. Romanova publishes extensively in academia in her field of expertise.

Before becoming the Deputy Mayor of Chernihiv in 2010, Romanova worked in management and marketing. Since 2010 she was coordinating City Council policy on tourism, international relations, culture, sport, family and youth. She left this position, following disagreement with the Mayor of the city, who refused to support Ukrainian soldiers in the Antiterrorist operation area.

Since 2001 she has been involved in volunteer activities, in 2008 Romanova became the head of Chernihiv NGO 'Civic Thought'. Since 2014 she is the Chair of Chernihiv regional representative office of the Samopomich Union.

In the Parliament, Romanova became the Secretary of the Committee on Family, Youth, Sport and Tourism Policies. She is the Head of the Sub-committee on Tourism, Resorts and Recreational activities.

== Personal life ==
Romanova has two daughters Viktoriya and Emma Romanova.
