= Vadym Ivchenko =

Ukrainian politician (born 1980)

Vadym Yevhenovych Ivchenko
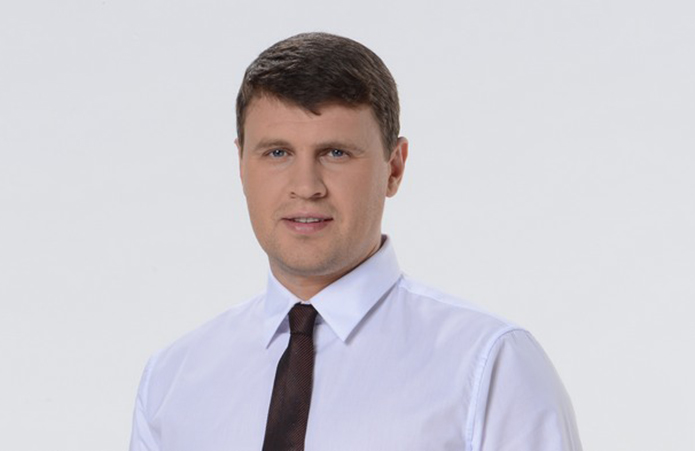

People's Deputy of Ukraine
- Incumbent
- Assumed office 27 November 2014

Personal details
- Born: 29 January 1980 (age 46) Ussuriysk, Russian Soviet Federative Socialist Republic, Soviet Union (now Russia)
- Party: All-Ukrainian Union "Fatherland"

Vadym Yevhenovych Ivchenko (Ukrainian: Вадим Івченко; born 29 January 1980) is a Ukrainian politician who has served as a People's Deputy of Ukraine in the 8th and 9th convocations of the Verkhovna Rada. Ivchenko is an advocate for pro-Western reforms in Ukraine and anti-corruption culture in Ukraine. In 2022, Mr. Ivchenko became a member of the Ukrainian delegation to the Parliamentary Assembly of the Black Sea Economic Cooperation (PABSEC). Member of the Verkhovna Rada Committee on National Security, Defence and Intelligence. Chairman of the Inter-Factional Parliamentary Association "For Ukraine's Military-Technical Might." He was the first to invite companies such as Northrop Grumman, Textron Systems, and Bell Helicopter to Ukraine. Today, projects associated with these companies are already actively developing.

== Career ==
In 2014 Ivchenko was elected as a People's Deputy of Ukraine in the 2014 Ukrainian parliamentary election. He became the assistant to the chairman of the Verkhovna Rada's Committee on Agricultural Policy and Sustainable Farming, as well as the representative of the All-Ukrainian Association of Village and Settlement Councils in the Verkhovna Rada and the Trade Unions of the Ukrainian Agricultural Sector.

Ivchenko was re-elected to parliament in the 2019 Ukrainian parliamentary election. For both elections he was on the Batkivshchyna election list, as the number 6 in 2014 and the number 24 in 2019.

Ivchenko actively participated in the 46th, 48th, 49th and 50th sessions of the Parliamentary Assembly of the Black Sea Economic Cooperation.

He is Deputy Co-Chair of the Group for Interparliamentary Relations with the People's Republic of China. • 2025 — Kyiv-Mohyla Business School (kmbs) / NaUKMA, Strategic Leadership Programme in Security and Defence Sector of Ukraine (qualification in Governance and Administration).

=== Legislative work ===
Vadym Ivchenko is the author and co-author of a number of important legislative bills for Ukraine, which became laws:

- to stimulate the establishment and operation of the family farms;
- to bring the legislation in the field of seeding and sending nurseries, so that they could function in line with European and international requirements;
- to reduce the administrative burden; and many more.

=== Business ===
Ivchenko is involved at the executive level in several enterprises that produce green energy, such as BC SOLAR LLC and ECO-ENERGY LDN LLC as well as the founder of the farm AGRO-CITY.

== Sports ==
Ivchenko supported and sponsored the All-Ukrainian boxing tournament, dedicated to the memory of the renown coaches V.I. Kurilova and S.I. Kosyakova

Ivchenko is a member of the National Parliament football team
