= Serhii Draiuk =

Ukrainian politician

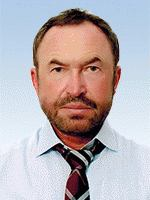
- Born: 18 June 1953 (age 72); Ladyzhyn, Ukrainian SSR, Soviet Union
- Political party: People's Front

Serhii Yevseyevych Draiuk (June 18, 1953, Ladyzhyn, Vinnytsia Oblast) is a Ukrainian politician and People's Deputy of Ukraine.

== Biography ==
In 1970, he graduated from Ladyzhyn Secondary School, receiving a high school diploma.

From 1971 to 1973, he served in the Soviet Army.

From 1974 to 1976, he worked as a mechanic at the "Vinnytsiaenerhoremont" enterprise.

From 1976 to 1980, he studied at Kharkiv Law Institute. After graduation, from 1980 to 1994, he worked in the Prosecutor's Office of Volyn and Dnipropetrovsk Oblasts, holding positions such as Senior Assistant District Prosecutor, Special Investigator of the Regional Prosecutor's Office, and Dnipropetrovsk Prosecutor overseeing law enforcement in correctional labor institutions.

From 1994 to 1997, he worked as deputy director of the auditing firm "VDT Audit."

From June to December 1997, he worked as a legal counsel at "PrivatBank."

From 1998 to 2007, he worked at the FZP "Veritas" as a legal expert, auditor, and deputy director for Legal Affairs.

From April 2007 to May 2009, he worked in the Prosecutor's Office of Kirovohrad Oblast, holding positions as Deputy Prosecutor of Kropyvnytskyi (then Kirovohrad) and Senior Assistant Regional Prosecutor.

From July 2009 to December 2010, he served as deputy director of the Legal Department of the public organization "Front for Change."

Since May 2014, he worked as an assistant to the Minister of Justice of Ukraine. In June 2014, he was appointed Head of the Organizational and Personnel Support Department of the State Enforcement Service of Ukraine.

Since December 2014, he has been a People's Deputy of Ukraine.

Despite being one of the older members of the Verkhovna Rada, Draiuk was considered one of the top 100 reformist deputies by Vox Ukraine's 2016 report.

== Controversy ==
In October 2015, media outlets published material stating that the deputy had failed to declare his ownership stakes in 10 companies.
