= Oleksandr Opanasenko =

Ukrainian politician

Oleksandr Opanasenko Олександр Опанасенко
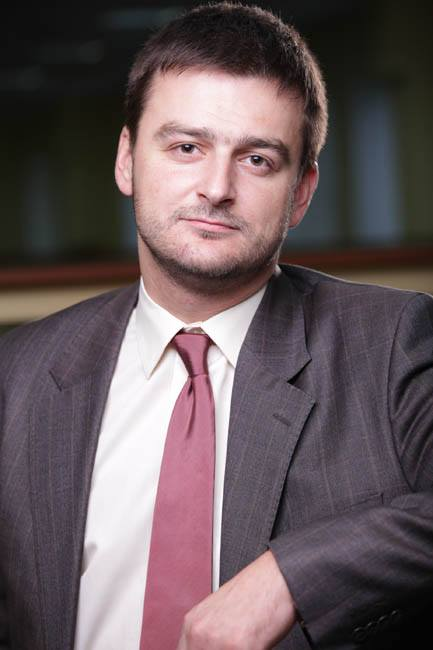
- In office 27 November 2014 – 29 August 2019

Personal details
- Born: April 20, 1977 (age 49) Tommot, Aldansky District, Yakut ASSR, Russian SFSR
- Party: Samopomich Union
- Education: Taras Shevchenko National University of Kyiv
- Occupation: lawmaker

Oleksandr Valeriyovych Opanasenko (Ukrainian: Олександр Валерійович Опанасенко, born April 20, 1977) is a Ukrainian politician, former Member of Parliament of Ukraine as a member of the Parliamentary faction Samopomich Union. Opanasenko did not return to parliament following the 2019 Ukrainian parliamentary election.

== Early life ==
Opanasenko was born in Tommot, Aldansky District, Yakut ASSR, Russian SFSR. He is a son of Valeriy Opanasenko, geophysics engineer and Natalia Opanasenko, telephonist. In 1986 the family moved from Russia to Ukrainian town Hlevakha in Kyiv oblast. Opanasenko went to school in Boyarka, which he graduated in 1994. In 1999 graduated with Specialist degree in Finances from Taras Shevchenko National University of Kyiv. In 2000–2001 studied at the MBA programme at the International Management Institute in Kyiv.

== Career ==
Opanasenko worked in advertising, insurance, and finances. He was the executive director at Forex Club Ukraine in 2004-2006 and financial director at VAB Insurance, Credit Collection Group, and Factoring Ukraine. In 2013 he became CEO of Holli Industrial.
