= Oleh Lavryk =

Ukrainian politician

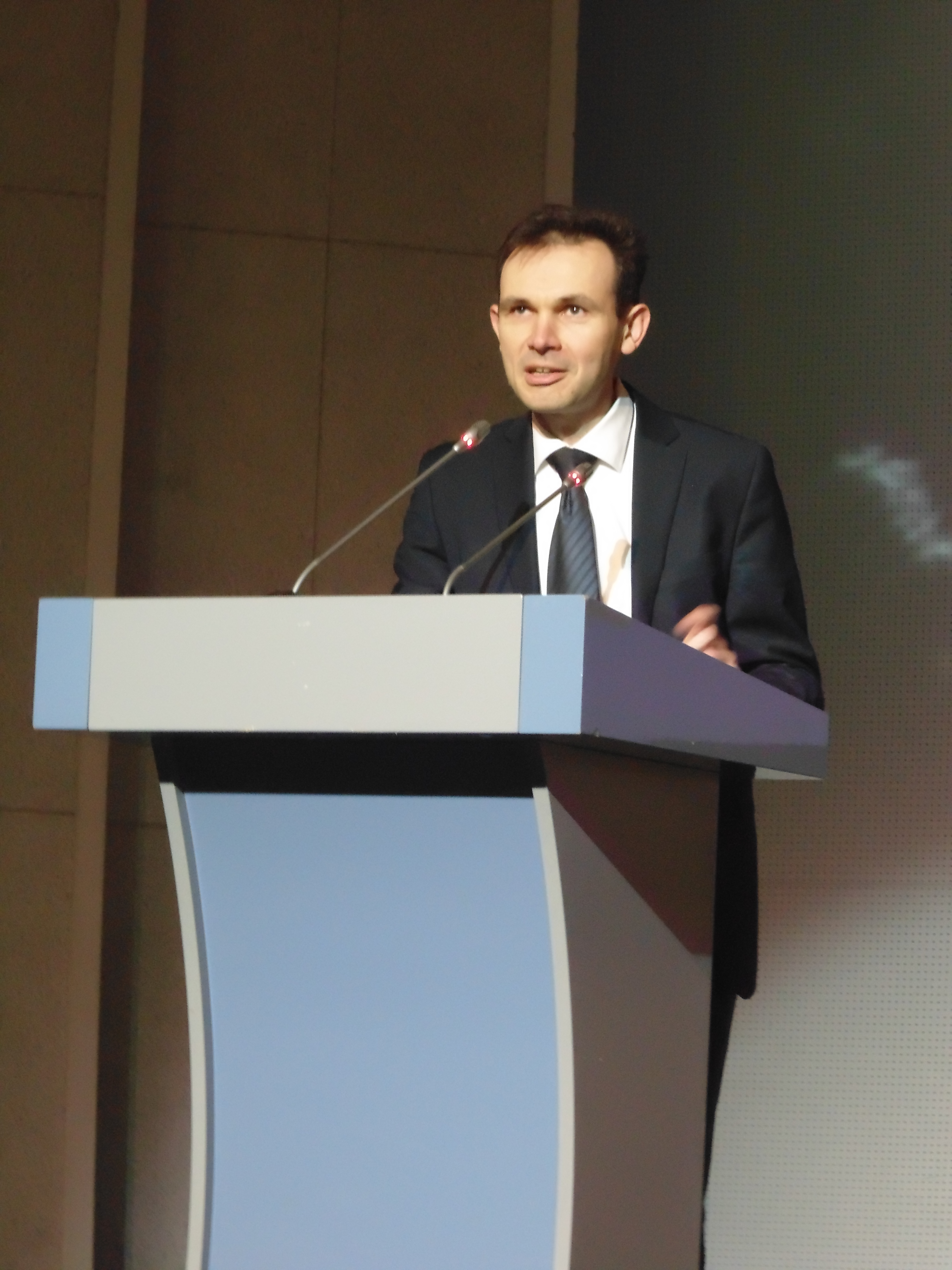
- Ukrainian politician
- Incumbent
- Assumed office November 27, 2014

Personal details
- Born: April 20, 1973 (age 53) Lviv, Ukraine
- Party: Samopomich Union
- Education: Lviv State I. Franko University
- Occupation: lawmaker

Oleh Vasyliovych Lavryk (born April 20, 1973) is a Ukrainian politician, Member of Parliament of Ukraine of the 8th convocation, member of the parliamentary faction Samopomich Union and NGO Samopomich Union.

== Biography ==
Oleh Lavryk was born in Lviv. He attended Lviv State I. Franko University, which he graduated in 1995 with a degree in physics. In 1996 he graduated from the same university with a degree in economy of enterprise. In 1996 Lavryk received master's degree in business management from Lviv Management Institute. Also, he studied in the Vein University in Detroit, US.

Lavryk started career in finances in 1996, taking a job as an expert-analytic in the investment company 'Halytski investytsii', in which he attained the post of director by 1999. Starting from April 1999, he became the head of the development department in the bank 'Lviv'. In 2001 started working in insurance, taking the job of director of the company Insurance Broker Expert, where he remained until January 2014. Starting January 2006, worked as the head of company 'Pivdenzahidelectromerezhbud'.

Lavryk was elected to the Lviv City Council. He is the head of the executive committee of the Samopomich Union party.

Lavryk is married and has two children.
