= Viktor Halasiuk =

Ukrainian economist

- Віктор Галасюк
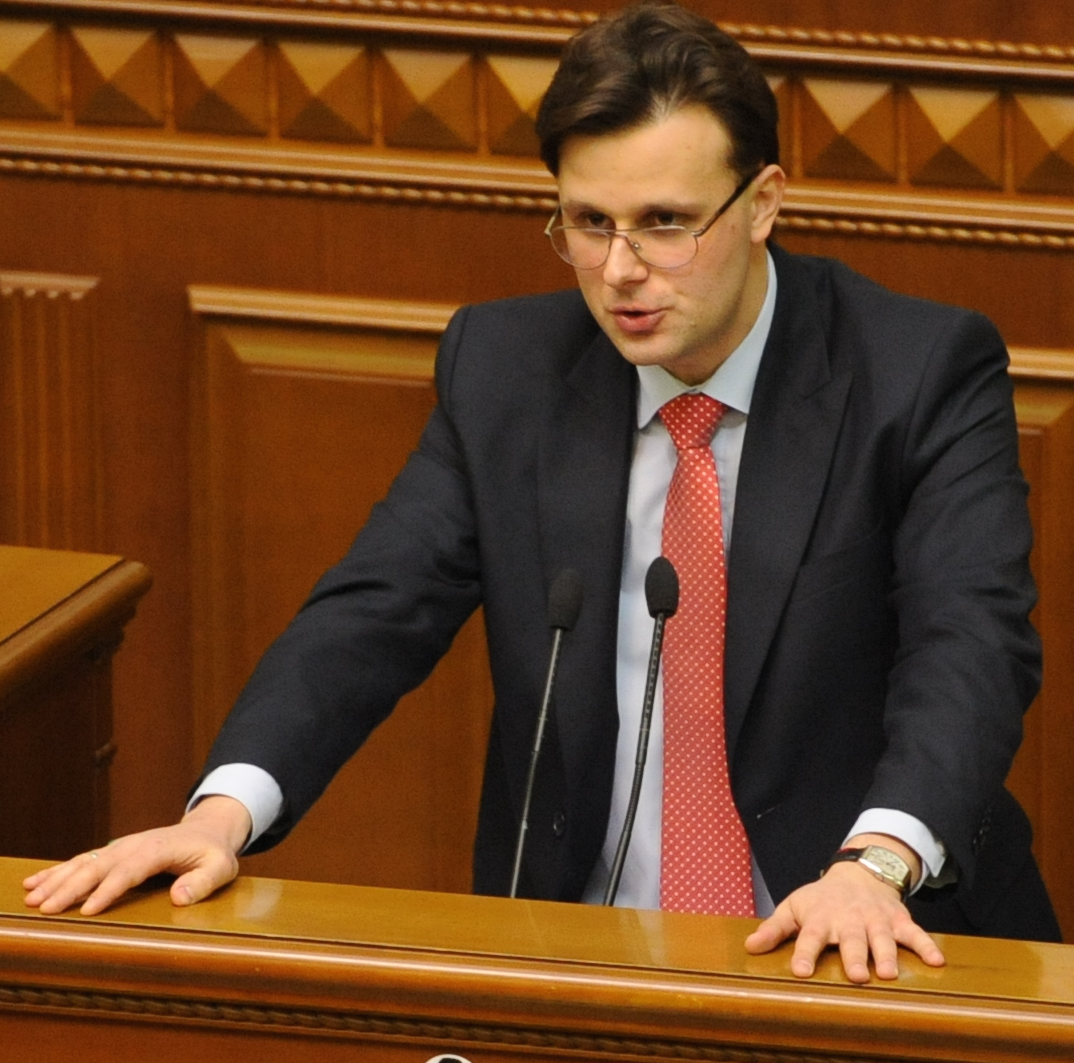
- Halasiuk speaking in the Verkhovna Rada, 2015

People's Deputy of Ukraine
- In office 27 November 2014 – 29 August 2019
- Constituency: RPOL, No. 10

Personal details
- Born: 28 August 1981 (age 44) Dnipropetrovsk, Ukrainian SSR, Soviet Union
- Party: Radical Party of Oleh Liashko

Viktor Valeriiovych Halasiuk (Ukrainian: Віктор Валерійович Галасюк; born 28 August 1981) is a Ukrainian economist and politician who served as a People's Deputy of Ukraine from the proportional list of the Radical Party of Oleh Liashko from 2014 to 2019. He is deputy leader of the RPOL on Economic Policy, President of the Ukrainian Association for the Club of Rome, a Member of National Reform Council, and Honorable President of the Ukrainian Association for Innovation Development (UAID).

== Personal life ==
Viktor Halasiuk (or Viktor Halasyuk) was born on 28 August 1981 in Dnipropetrovsk, in the Ukrainian SSR. He is married.

== Career ==
Halasiuk appeared tenth on the party list of the Radical Party of Oleh Liashko, Halasiuk was elected to the Verkhovna Rada in the 2014 Ukrainian parliamentary election.
