= Iryna Yefremova =

Ukrainian politician (born 1959)

Iryna Oleksiivna Yefremova (born 26 March 1959) is a Ukrainian politician. People's Deputy of Ukraine of the 8th convocation. Since October 5, 2018, a member of the Central Election Commission of Ukraine.

== Early life and education ==
In 1988, Yefremova graduated from H.S. Skovoroda Kharkiv National Pedagogical University as a Russian language and literature teacher.

In 2003, she graduated from Yaroslav Mudryi National Law University in Kharkiv, majoring in law.

In 2008, Yefremova obtained a master's degree in Public Administration from the Kharkiv Regional Institute of Public Administration of the National Academy of Public Administration under the President of Ukraine. In 2017, she became a Doctor of Law at Kharkiv National University of Internal Affairs of the Ministry of Internal Affairs of Ukraine.

== Career ==
Yefremova worked in the Lenin People's Court as a court session secretary in Kharkiv. In 1978, she moved to Zmiyiv, Kharkiv region. She worked at the Zmiiv boarding school, the Chemuzh secondary school of the Zmiiv district, the Zmiiv district executive committee, and the Zmiiv district state administration (Head of the family and youth department).

From 2002 to 2005, Yefremova was a lawyer at the private firm "Kredo" in Zmiivskyi district, Kharkiv region. Between 2005 and 2010, she was the Head of the Pechinihy District State Administration in Kharkiv region. Since 2010, Yefremova has been the deputy director of the Institute of Regional Policy.

She was a Deputy of the Kharkiv Regional Council of the 6th convocation as a member All-Ukrainian Union “Batkivshchyna" ("Fatherland").

In November 2014, Yefremova was elected as People's Deputy of Ukraine of the VIII convocation. Yefremova entered parliament from the People's Front party.

On October 4, 2018, the Verkhovna Rada prematurely terminated the powers of deputy Yefremova, who was appointed a member of the Central Election Commission.

Since October 5, 2018, she is a member of the Central Election Commission of Ukraine.

== Awards and honors ==
- Order of Princess Olga, III degree (2008).
- Orthodox orders of “Great Martyr Varvara" and "Great Martyr Catherine" of I-II degrees, the order "To the 1020th Anniversary of the Baptism of Rus’."
- Honorary citizen of the Kharkiv region (2020).
