= Oleksandr Bakumenko =

Ukrainian politician (1959–2022)

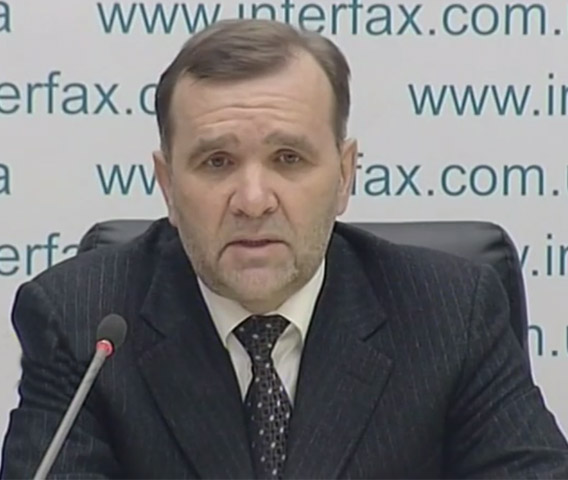
- Bakumenko in 2014

Member of the Verkhovna Rada
- In office 27 November 2014 – 29 August 2019

Personal details
- Born: Oleksandr Borysovych Bakumenko; 29 April 1959 Kharkiv, Ukrainian SSR, Soviet Union
- Died: 11 April 2022 (aged 62)
- Party: European Solidarity
- Education: Kharkiv State Veterinary Academy

Oleksandr Borysovych Bakumenko (Ukrainian: Олекса́ндр Бори́сович Баку́менко; 29 April 1959 – 11 April 2022) was a Ukrainian politician. A member of European Solidarity, he served in the Verkhovna Rada from 2014 to 2019. He died on 11 April 2022 at the age of 62.

== Early life ==
Bakumenko was born on 29 May 1959 in Kharkiv, which was then part of the Ukrainian SSR in the Soviet Union. He later graduated from the Kharkiv State Veterinary Academy, receiving the specialty of zooengineer. He then began, in 1983, working for the institute after his graduation, but left to serve his mandatory conscription in the Soviet Armed Forces.

After returning, he started to work in many agricultural enterprises in the field of poultry farming. However, he briefly switched to consulting in the 1990s and worked for the Association "Regional Consulting Center", before returning to poultry to work as the General Director of the Kharkiv Regional Association of Poultry Industry. He then worked as the Chairman of the Board of Directors of the Association "Union of Poultry Farmers of Ukraine", and then in 2007, he became General Director of the Association "Union of Feed Producers of Ukraine".

== Politics ==
In 2006 he became a Member of the Presidium of the International Polutry Council and a member of the Presidium in the National Agricultural Chamber of Ukraine. The following year, he began to work in the Council of National Associations of Commodity Producers, and then in 2009 he held the position of Deputy Head of the Agrarian Union of Ukraine. He ran in the 2014 Ukrainian parliamentary election as part of the Petro Poroshenko Bloc as part of the party list, which he was number 57 on, and secured a seat in the Rada. In the Rada, he served on the Committee of the Verkhovna Rada of Ukraine on Agrarian Policy and Land Relations.
