= Roman Semenukha =

Ukrainian politician

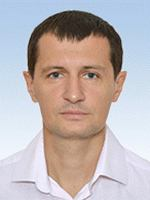
- In office 27 November 2014 – 29 August 2019

Personal details
- Born: July 30, 1970 (age 55) Kharkiv
- Party: Samopomich

Roman Sergiyovych Semenukha (born July 30, 1977) is a Ukrainian politician and former Member of Parliament of the Samopomich Union faction.

Semenukha again took part in the July 2019 Ukrainian parliamentary election for Samopomich placed 12th on its national election list. But in the election the party won 1 seat (in one of the electoral constituencies) while only scoring 0.62% of the national (election list) vote.

== Biography ==
Semenukha was born in Kharkiv. He studied in school #104 in Kharkiv and graduated in 1994. In 2009, he obtained master's degree in Enterprise Economy from Kharkiv State University of Food Technology and Trade. In 2008–2010, he studied at the International Management Institute LINK. Semenukha was entrepreneur before entering the Ukrainian Parliament in 2014. Semenukha has been actively involved in social activism since 1997. He was the member of Ukrainian Student Union, a leader of the Youth Movement in Kharkiv. Before affiliating to NGO Samopomich in 2014, Semenukha was the member of political parties People's Movement of Ukraine, and People's Movement of Ukraine for Unity. He is married and has two daughters.
