= Ruslan Sydorovych =

Ukrainian politician and lawyer

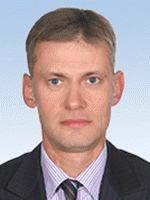
- Sydorovych in 2014
- In office 27 November 2014 – 29 August 2019

Personal details
- Born: 24 October 1974 (age 51) Lviv, Ukraine
- Party: Samopomich Union
- Education: Lviv University
- Profession: lawyer

Ruslan Mykhaylovych Sydorovych (born October 24, 1974) is a Ukrainian politician and lawyer. He was a Member of Parliament as a member of the parliamentary faction Samopomich Union. Co-chair of the "Deputy Control" union. Sydorovych again took part in the July 2019 Ukrainian parliamentary election for Samopomich as its number 10 on its national election list. But in the election the party won 1 seat (in one of the electoral constituencies) while only scoring 0.62% of the national (election list) vote.

== Biography ==
Sydorovych was born on 24 October 1974, in Lviv. In 1991, graduated from Stryi high school #10. In 1996, he received a degree in Law from Ivan Franko National University of Lviv. He started working in law consulting in 1994. Since 1999 pursued career in advocacy. From 1999 to 2001, he was engaged in private law practice.

From 2001 to 2003, he was the President of the bar association "Legal Company Sydorovych, Gren and partners". In the period from 2003 to 2008, obtained the post of the President of the bar association "Legal Company Sydorovych and partners". In 2008, he served as the Acting Chief of Staff of the Kyiv-Svyatoshinsky District State Administration. From 2008 to 2009, he worked as a lawyer at the lawyer association "Legal Company Sydorovych and partners".

Since 2010, he was the managing partner of the Lawyers Association 'Attorneys at Law Sydorovych and Partners".

Since March 1996, he is the member of the Ukrainian Bar Association, since 2006 - board member of the regional organisation of the Ukrainian Bar Association. Since 2005, he has been a permanent judge of the Arbitration Court of the Lviv Association of the Real Estate Market.

In 2012, the founding conference of Lviv region lawyers elected him the member of the lawyers of the region.

In 2006, he received the award of the Mayor of Lviv for the dissemination of legal knowledge among the population. He is married and has two children.
