= Donets (disambiguation) =

The Donets is a river on the south of the East European Plain, known between locals as Siverskyi Donets or Severskiy Donets.

Donets or Donetz also may refer to:

- Donets, Ukraine, formerly Chervonyi Donets, a rural settlement in Ukraine
- Donets Basin or Donetz Basin, a region known as Donbas or Donbass
- Donets Kryvyi Rih Soviet Republic, a former breakaway Soviet republic of the October Revolution
- Donets Ridge
- Battle of the Donets (disambiguation)
- Dnieper–Donets culture

== People ==
- Andriy Donets' (born 1981), Ukrainian soccer player
- Irina Donets (born 1976), Dutch volleyball player
- Natalia Donets (born 1957), Ukrainian politician
- Stanislav Donets (born 1983), Russian swimmer
- Tetiana Donets (born 1980), Ukrainian politician

== Ships ==
- SS Donetz (1924), a cargo ship in the List of shipwrecks in 1936
- SS Donetz (1937), a cargo ship

== See also ==
- Donetsk (disambiguation)
- Dönitz (surname)
