= Donetsk City =

Donetsk City may refer to:

- Donetsk, city in Ukraine
- Donetsk City (mall), shopping mall in Donetsk, Ukraine
- Donetsk, Rostov Oblast, city in Russia

== See also ==
- Donetsk (disambiguation)
