= Ukraine's 168th electoral district =

No.168
- Single-mandate constituency
- Electoral districts of Kharkiv, Ukraine
- Oblast: Kharkiv Oblast
- Major settlements: Shevchenkivskyi District, Kharkiv

Current single-mandate constituency
- Created: 28 April 2012
- Seats: Single MP
Current MP
Maria Mezentseva
Servant of the People (since 2019)

Electoral district 168 (Ukrainian: Одномандатний виборчий округ №168, Odnomandatnyi vyborchyi okruh №168), shortened to OVO No.168 (Ukrainian: ОВО №168) is one of 225 electoral districts that elects a member of parliament (people's deputy) to the Verkhovna Rada, Ukraine's national parliament.

The district is located in the Shevchenkivskyi District, Kharkiv. It was created in its current form by the No. 82 decree of the Central Election Commission on 28 April 2012 (before this, a different form of electoral districts existed in the country). The election commission of this district is located in the premises of the Shevchenkivskyi District administration of the Kharkiv City Council at the Science Avenue, Kharkiv, 17a.

The 168th electoral district borders the 175th to its northwest and northeast, 169th to its north, east, and southeast, 173rd to its south, and 174th to its southwest.

The district's area is 62 square kilometres (24 sq mi). It encompasses 88 polling stations.

== List of deputies ==
Name	Image	Party	Convocation	Took office	Left office	Time in office	Ref.
Valeriy Pysarenko		Party of Regions	7th	12 December 2012	27 November 2014	1 year, 350 days	
Valeriy Pysarenko		Independent	8th	27 November 2014	29 August 2019	4 years, 275 days	
Maria Mezentseva		Servant of the People	9th	29 August 2019	Incumbent	7 years, 44 days	

== Elections ==
=== Parliamentary elections ===
==== 2019 ====
2019 Ukrainian parliamentary election
Party	Candidate	Votes	%	±%
Servant of the People	Maria Mezentseva	30,377	41.51	New
Independent	Valeriy Pysarenko	17,839	24.38	▼6.6
Independent	Volodymyr Semynozhenko	10,149	13.87	New
European Solidarity	Halyna Kuts	6,787	9.27	▼8.63
Batkivshchyna	Danil Chulkov	1,734	2.36	New
SiCh	Yuriy Olkhovskyi	1,674	2.28	New
Independent	Mykola Zelenskyy	1,461	1.99	New
Svoboda	Valeriy Konyk	1,083	1.48	New
Samopomich	Serhii Barannykov	859	1.17	▼11.74
Independent	Stanislav Poliakov	656	0.89	New
Independent	Dmytro Prykhodkin	232	0.31	New
Independent	Yanina Bondarzhevska	182	0.24	New
Independent	Svitlana Padieieva	133	0.18	New
Total votes		73,215	100.0	▼1,575
Servant of the People gain from Independent		Swing	▲17.13	

==== 2014 ====
2014 Ukrainian parliamentary election
Party	Candidate	Votes	%	±%
Independent	Valeriy Pysarenko	23,175	30.98	
Petro Poroshenko Bloc	Vitaliy Nemilostivyi	13,389	17.90	
Samopomich	Taras Sitenko	9,656	12.91	
People's Front	Ivan Varchenko	8,051	10.76	
Strong Ukraine	Yevhen Hutkov	3,537	4.72	
Independent	Volodymyr Chystilin	3,143	4.20	
Independent	Anatoliy Pysarenko	2,573	3.44	
Independent	Yuriy Chubuk	2,221	2.96	
Independent	Liudmyla Aleksandrovska	2,122	2.83	
Radical Party	Fedir Venislavskyi	1,900	2.54	
Bloc of Left Forces of Ukraine	Liudmyla Aleksandrovska	1,005	1.34	
Independent	Vitaliy Bartashchuk	759	1.01	
Independent	Oleksandr Hroshevoy	744	0.99	
Independent	Dmytro Marynin	744	0.99	
Independent	Pavlo Makarenko	694	0.92	
Independent	Oleksandr Kuskov	340	0.45	
Independent	Yuliy Volchenko	294	0.39	
National Democratic Party of Ukraine	Yevheniy Zlobintsev	224	0.29	
Independent	Anton Zhylin	219	0.29	
Total votes		74,790	100.0	
Independent gain from Petro Poroshenko Bloc		Swing	▲13.08	
