= Human rights in Ukraine =

Human rights in Ukraine concern the fundamental rights of every person in Ukraine. Between 2017 and 2022, Freedom House has given Ukraine ratings from 60 to 62 on its 100-point scale, and a "partly free" overall rating. Ratings on electoral processes have generally been good, but there are problems with corruption and due process. Its rating later declined in 2023 due to the Russian invasion of Ukraine, which led to the enactment of martial law in Ukraine, as well as a labor code that removed many legal protection for employees and small and medium-sized companies, as well as a law that increased the government's power to regulate media companies and journalism. Since the beginning of the invasion Russia has engaged in various war crimes against Ukrainian civilians and the invasion has had a major humanitarian impact on Ukraine and its citizens.

Both the 2015 local elections and the 2019 presidential elections were generally peaceful, competitive and fair, although there are indications of misuse of state resources and vote-buying, and media pluralism has not yet been fully achieved. Attacks on journalists, civil society activists and members of minority groups are frequent, and police responses inadequate.

As of 2021 investigations into crimes against journalists and human rights activists often do not result in convictions, and impunity for torture is still widespread. Gender-based and homophobic violence by groups advocating discrimination are also a cause for concern, as well as linguistic rights of national minorities. War crimes committed by both sides of the war in Donbas are not prosecuted, and in Russian-occupied Crimea dissent is repressed.

== Background ==
=== Prior to 1991 ===
As part of the Soviet Union, all human rights were severely limited. The Soviet Union was a one-party state until 1990 and a totalitarian state from 1927 until 1953 where members of the Communist Party held all key positions in the institutions of the state and other organizations. Freedom of speech was suppressed and dissent was punished. Independent political activities were not tolerated, whether these involved participation in free labor unions, private corporations, independent churches or opposition political parties. The freedom of movement within and especially outside the country was limited.

=== 1991–2014 ===
In 1991 Ukraine declared independence. The referendum on the Act of Declaration of Independence was held in Ukraine on 1 December 1991. An overwhelming majority of 92.3% of voters approved the declaration of independence made by the Verkhovna Rada on 24 August 1991. Until 8 June 1995, Ukraine's supreme law was the Constitution (Fundamental Law) of the Ukrainian SSR (adopted in 1978, with numerous later amendments). On 8 June 1995, President Leonid Kuchma and Speaker Oleksandr Moroz (acting on behalf of the parliament) signed the Constitutional Agreement for the period until a new constitution could be drafted.

The first constitution since independence was adopted during an overnight parliamentary session after almost 24 hours of debate of 27–28 June 1996, unofficially known as "the constitutional night of 1996". The Law No. 254/96-BP ratifying the constitution, nullifying previous constitutions. The Agreement was ceremonially signed and promulgated in mid-July 1996. According to a ruling of the Constitutional Court of Ukraine, the constitution took force at the moment when the results of the parliamentary vote were announced on 28 June 1996 at approx. 9 a.m. Kyiv Time and for the first time enshrined the obligations of human rights into law.

Ukraine was labelled as "free" by Freedom House in 2009. In their report they stated, "Ukraine has one of the most vibrant civil societies in the region. Citizens are increasingly taking issues into their own hands, protesting against unwanted construction, and exposing corruption. There were no limits seen on NGO activities. Trade unions function, but strikes and worker protests were infrequently observed, even though dissatisfaction with the state of economic affairs was pervasive in the fall of 2008. Factory owners were seen as still able to pressure their workers to vote according to the owners' preferences."

On 20 October 2009 experts from the Council of Europe stated, "in the last five years the experts from the Council of Europe who monitor Ukraine have expressed practically no concerns regarding the important [process of the] formation of a civil society in Ukraine. Ukraine is one of the democratic states in Europe that is securing human rights as a national policy, as well as securing the rights of national minorities." According to Human Rights Watch (HRW), "while civil society institutions operate mostly without government interference, police abuse and violations of the rights of vulnerable groups … continue to mar Ukraine's human rights record."

After the early 2010 election of President Viktor Yanukovych international organizations started to voice their concern. According to Freedom House, "Ukraine under President Yanukovych has become less democratic and, if current trends are left unchecked, may head down a path toward autocracy and kleptocracy." Among the recent negative developments, they mentioned, "a more restrictive environment for the media, selective prosecution of opposition figures, worrisome intrusiveness by the Security Service of Ukraine, widely criticized local elections in October 2010 … and erosion of basic freedoms of assembly and speech." This led Freedom House to downgrade Ukraine from "Free" to "Partly Free" in Freedom in the World 2011. Also in 2011 Amnesty International spoke of "an increase in the number of allegations of torture and ill-treatment in police custody, restrictions on the freedom of speech and assembly, as well as mass manifestations of xenophobia".

In Reporters Without Borders Press Freedom Index 2010 Ukraine had fallen from 89th place to 131. Neighboring Russia's press freedom was ranked at position 140. The International Federation for Human Rights called Ukraine "one of the countries seeing the most serious violations against human rights activists" in December 2011.

As of late 2013 the situation continued to deteriorate and was one of the causes of the Euromaidan revolution, as joining or even working towards meeting the requirement to join the European Union would dramatically improve human rights across Ukraine. Russia, which had already laid the ground work reacted to the Euromaidan protests and invaded Crimea and the wider Donbas regions.

== International and European human rights treaties ==
=== Ukraine is a party to the following international treaties ===
- International Covenant on Civil and Political Rights (ICCPR)
- (First) Optional Protocol to the ICCPR
- International Covenant on Economic, Social and Cultural Rights
- Convention on the Elimination of All Forms of Discrimination against Women (CEDAW)
- Optional Protocol to CEDAW
- Convention on the Rights of the Child (CRC)
- Optional Protocol to the CRC on the involvement of children in armed conflict
- International Convention on the Elimination of All Forms of Racial Discrimination
- Convention against Torture and Other Cruel, Inhuman or Degrading Treatment or Punishment
- Optional Protocol to the Convention against Torture
- Convention relating to the Status of Refugees (1951)
- Protocol relating to the Status of Refugees (1967)

Ukraine signed but not yet ratified

- Rome Statute of the International Criminal Court

=== Ukraine is a party to the following European treaties ===
- European Convention for the Protection of Human Rights and Fundamental Freedoms (ECHR) (1950)
- Protocol No. 6 to the ECHR concerning the abolition of the death penalty in times of peace (1983)
- Protocol No. 12 to the ECHR concerning the general prohibition of discrimination (2000)
- Protocol No. 13 to the ECHR concerning the abolition of the death penalty in all circumstances (2002)
- Framework Convention on the Protection of National Minorities

== Situation ==
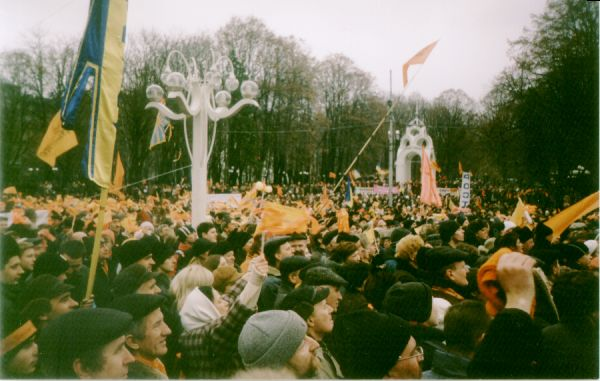
Meeting in Kharkiv during the 2004 Orange Revolution

As of 17 January 2013 Ukraine had lost all of its 211 cases at the European Court of Human Rights.

=== Mass graves found in areas liberated from Russian control ===
After Bucha, Lyman, Makariv, and Kherson were liberated from Russian occupation, Ukraine discovered mass graves containing bodies of civilians. Victims frequently bore evidence of torture.

=== Electoral rights ===
International observers, including Freedom House and the United States Department of State, generally consider Ukrainian election processes to be free and fair. However, there were credible allegations of vote-buying, and media coverage was at times biased. Nazi and Communist parties are banned.

=== The right to receive a fair trial ===
Amendments to the constitution, which came into force, were detrimental to the right to receive a fair trial because they re-introduced the so-called general supervision by the prosecutor's office. Other serious problems included lengthy periods for review of cases because the courts were overloaded; infringement of equality of arms; non-observance of the presumption of innocence; the failure to execute court rulings; and high level of corruption in courts. Independent lawyers and human rights activists have complained Ukrainian judges regularly come under pressure to hand down a certain verdict.

According to Freedom House, the judiciary has become more efficient and less corrupt since the Orange Revolution.

Recent (since 2010) trials of high-profile political figures (Note: Cases were opened against: 1) Prime Minister – Tymoshenko. 2) Minister of Police – Lutsenko. 3) Minister of Defence – Ivashchenko. 4) Minister of Finance – Danylyshyn. 5) Minister of Natural Resources – Filipchuk. 6) Deputy Minister of Justice – Korneichuk. 7) Head of Customs of Ukraine – Makarenko. 8) Head of the regional customs – Shepitko. 9–10) Head of the State Treasury of Ukraine – Slyuz; Deputy head – Gritsoun. 11) Deputy head of "Naftogaz" (state monopoly on trade in gas and oil) – Didenko. 12) Governor of Dnipropetrovsk region (former Minister of Transport) – Bondar. Repeatedly called in for questioning in order to open a criminal case : minister and former mayor of Lviv – Kuybida; First Deputy Prime Minister – Turchynov.) Yulia Tymoshenko, Yuriy Lutsenko, Igor Didenko, Anatoliy Makarenko and Valeriy Ivaschenko have been described by the European Commission, the United States and other international organizations as "unfair, untransparent and not independent" and "selective prosecution of political opponents".

=== Language rights ===
Multiple languages have always been spoken in what is now Ukraine. In the 19th century the Russians and Jews were the main ethnic groups in the urban areas while the countryside was mostly Ukrainian. Ukraine has a history of linguistic conflict dating back to at least the 19th century. In 1863, Russian Minister of Internal Affairs Pyotr Valuev issued a circular that banned the publication of religious texts and educational texts written in the Ukrainian language.

The Soviet policy towards the Ukrainian language varied from the promotion of it under Lenin ("indigenization") to the persecution of the pro-Ukrainian language movement under Stalin, and tolerance of it which was coupled with the gradual decline of the use of the Ukrainian language and the creeping russification of Ukraine under Khrushchev and Brezhnev. Following Ukraine's declaration of independence in 1991, the previous pro-Russian policies were reversed and the use of the Ukrainian language was actively encouraged and in certain areas, it was made compulsory. The 1996 Constitution stated that Ukrainian is the state language, and it also stated that the free use and development of Russian and other national minority languages is also permitted.

Subsequent legislation, notably the 2019 Law on Ensuring the Functioning of the Ukrainian Language as the State Language, made the use of Ukrainian mandatory in various areas of public life. Exceptions were made for languages that are considered "indigenous" because the speakers of them lack a kin-state, such as the Crimean Tatar language and the Karaim language, as well as those languages that are the official languages of the European Union. However, significant minority languages in Ukraine, such as Russian, Belarusian and Jewish, are neither official EU languages nor indigenous, and concerns have been raised about their protection. For example, print and online publications in languages that do not meet these criteria are prohibited unless they also have a Ukrainian translation, and secondary schooling in these languages is prohibited. The differential treatment of minority languages has been criticized on human rights and discrimination grounds by the Venice Commission, Human Rights Watch and the United Nations Human Rights Office.

Russia exaggerated the real language issues, using them to create a false justification for the 2022 Russian invasion of Ukraine. False claims included claims that Ukraine has been committing genocide, and claims that Ukrainians have been shooting people who speak Russian. In areas it controlled, Russia required that all classes be in Russian and allegedly tortured a teacher for teaching in Ukrainian.

=== Media freedom and freedom of information ===
In 2007, in Ukraine's provinces numerous, anonymous attacks and threats persisted against journalists, who investigated or exposed corruption or other government misdeeds. The US-based Committee to Protect Journalists concluded in 2007 that these attacks, and police reluctance in some cases to pursue the perpetrators, were "helping to foster an atmosphere of impunity against independent journalists".

Ukraine's ranking in Reporters Without Borders's Press Freedom Index has in the latest years been around the 90th spot (89 in 2009, 87 in 2008), while it occupied the 112th spot in 2002 and even the 132nd spot in 2004.

During the Russia-backed 2010-2014 Presidency of Viktor Yanukovych was elected President of Ukraine, journalistic watchdogs complained about a deterioration of press freedom in Ukraine. Anonymous journalists said early May 2010 that they were voluntarily tailoring their coverage so as not to offend the Yanukovych administration and the Yanukovych Government. The Yanukovych Government said it did not censor the media, so did the Presidential Administration and President Yanukovych himself.

A May 2014 report from the Organization for Security and Co-operation in Europe (OSCE) said that there were approximately 300 violent attacks on the media in Ukraine since November 2013. A crackdown on what authorities describe as "pro-separatist" points of view have triggered dismay among Western human rights monitors. For example, the 11 September 2014 shutdown of Vesti newspaper by the Ukrainian Security Service for "violating Ukraine's territorial integrity" brought swift condemnation from the Committee to Protect Journalists and the Organization for Security and Co-operation in Europe. (Note: Former Vesti News's editor-in-chief Igor Guzhva wrote on his Facebook page that the news outlet had been raided by Security Service of Ukraine (SBU). The SBU reportedly took all servers, kept staffers in a "hot corridor" and shut down the website completely. Guzhva said that the purpose of the raid was "to block our work". "Journalists are not being let into their office", Guzhva wrote. "Those who were already inside at the moment of the raid are being kept in the building and are not allowed to use cell phones." Guzhva said that this is the second time in just six months that the SBU has tried to "intimidate" its editors. He added that he is unsure of the reason for the raid, but suspects that it might have to do with a story the website recently published on the SBU chief's daughter.)

Ukraine has also shut down several television stations operated by Russia on the grounds that they spread Russian propaganda. In February 2017 the Ukrainian government banned the commercial importation of books from Russia, which had accounted for up to 60% of all titles sold.

According to Amnesty International, in 2021 the media were generally pluralistic and free, but some outlets were discriminated against by officials because of their perceived pro-Russian leaning. Criticisms have been levelled at the decision to deprive Taras Kozak's TV channels of broadcasting licences. The investigation into the murder of the journalist Pavel Sheremet in 2016 were undermined by serious deficiencies and lack of credibility.

=== Freedom of expression and conscience ===
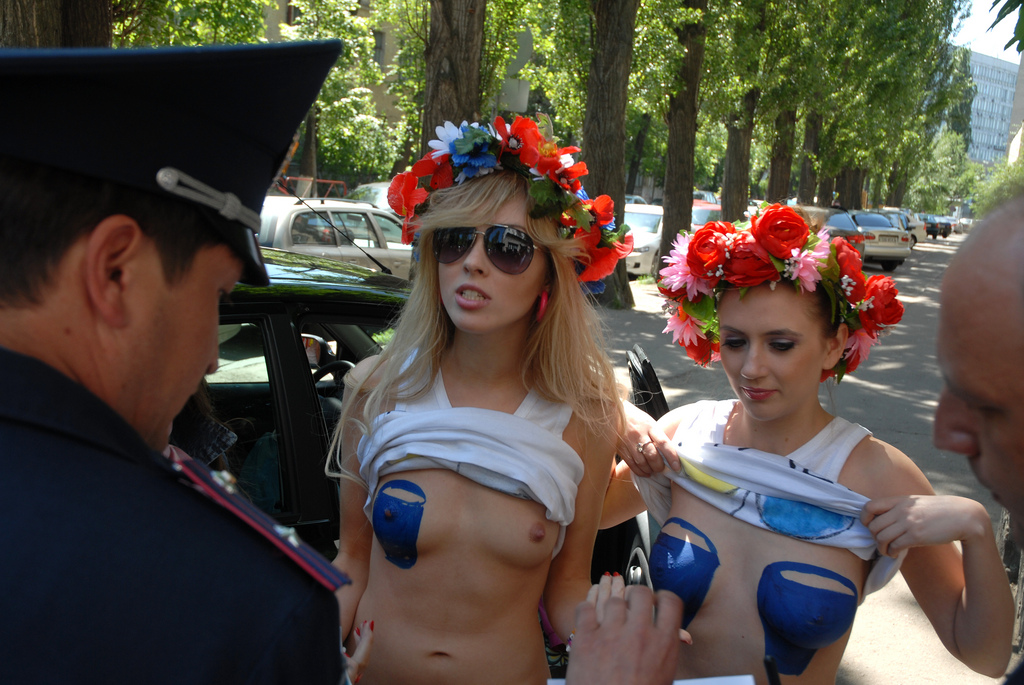
FEMEN is a feminist protest group founded in Ukraine in 2008. The organization became internationally known for organizing topless protests against sex tourism, religious institutions, sexism and homophobia.

=== Torture and conditions in detention ===
Reports of torture and ill-treatment by police persisted during 2007, as did unduly long periods of pretrial custody. Of major concern were the inhumane conditions in detention with overcrowded cells, appalling sanitary conditions and the lack of appropriate medical care. During the year numerous group suicide attempts took place in some penal colonies.

In Eastern Ukraine, the SBU conducted torture and human rights abuses for alleged pro-Russian separatists, according to 2016 reports. Some of this torture took place in secret prisons with unacknowledged detention. The existence of black sites was denounced by multiple reports of the UN monitoring mission in Ukraine, Amnesty International and Human Rights Watch.

On 25 May 2016, the United Nations Subcommittee on Prevention of Torture (SPT) suspended its visit to Ukraine after the government denied it access to places in several parts of the country where it suspects these secret jails were located. In 2018 Amnesty International concluded that, "The investigation into the Security Service of Ukraine (SBU) for its alleged secret prisons failed to make any progress. Law enforcement officials continued to use torture and other ill-treatment."

According to Amnesty International, in 2021 abuse of prisoners remained "endemic". As reported by the Prosecutor General's Office, in March 2022 the European Court of Human Rights had ruled against Ukraine in 115 cases. The European Court found that Oleksandr Rafalsky had spent 15 years in prison despite good reasons to believe that his "confessions" had been extorted by torture.

During the 2022 Russian invasion of Ukraine numerous acts of torture of civilians and numerous acts of torture of prisoners of war by Russian forces have been documented, including rape and sexual violence against men, women, and children by Russian forces.

=== Human rights abuses and the HIV/AIDS epidemic ===
The Ukrainian government has taken a number of positive steps to fight HIV/AIDS, chiefly in the area of legislative and policy reform. But these important commitments are being undermined in the criminal justice and health systems by widespread human rights abuses against drug users, sex workers, and people living with HIV/AIDS.

=== Human trafficking ===
There has been a growing awareness of human trafficking as a human rights issue in Europe. The end of communism has contributed to an increase in human trafficking, with the majority of victims being women forced into prostitution. In 2013 Ukraine was a country of origin and country of transit for persons, primarily women and children, trafficked for the purpose of sexual exploitation and forced labor. Charcoal production and pornography have been listed in the U.S. Department of Labor's List of Goods Produced by Child Labor or Forced Labor under the country of Ukraine in December 2014. The Government of Ukraine has shown some commitment to combatting trafficking but has been criticized for not fully complying with the minimum standards for the elimination of trafficking, and for inadequate trafficking prevention efforts.

=== Violence against women ===
Violence against women is an entrenched social problem in Ukrainian culture engendered by traditional male and female stereotypes. It was not recognized during the Soviet era, but in recent decades the issue became an important topic of discussion in Ukrainian society and among academic scholars. According to the estimation of OSCE the violence towards women is widespread in Ukraine and it is associated with three times more deaths than the ongoing armed conflict in the eastern provinces of the country.

== War in Donbas ==
During the ongoing Russo-Ukrainian War, Ukraine has lost control of Crimea and parts of the Donbas. On 21 May 2015, the Verkhovna Rada of Ukraine has passed a resolution declaring that it has withdrawn from some of the obligations stipulated in the International Covenant on Civil and Political Rights (articles 2, 9, 12, 14, 17), the Convention for the Protection of Human Rights and Fundamental Freedoms (articles 5, 6, 8, 13) and European Social Charter (articles 1 p. 2, 4 p. 2-3, 8 p. 1, 14 p. 1, 15,16,17 p. 1a p. 1c, 23,30, 31 p. 1-2) at the Donbas region until "Russia cease its aggression in eastern Ukraine".

== Ukrainian human rights organizations ==
- Association "Civic Initiative" (Kirovohrad) (in Ukrainian)
- Association of Ukrainian Human Rights Monitors on Law Enforcement (Association UMDPL) uk:Association of Ukrainian Human Rights Monitors on Law Enforcement (Association UMDPL)
- Civic Methodics and Information Center «Universe»
- Chernigiv Committee for the Protection of Citizen's Constitutional Rights
- Committee of Voters of Ukraine
- Congress of National Communities of Ukraine
- Donetsk Memorial
- "For Professional Assistance" (Poltava region) (in Russian)
- Kharkiv Human Rights Protection Group
- Odesa Human Rights Group "Veritas"
- Ukrainian Helsinki Human Rights Union
- Road Control

== International human rights organizations with branches in Ukraine ==
- Amnesty International Ukraine, led by Oksana Pokalchuk (2017–present)
- International Society for Human Rights-Ukrainian Branch (in Ukrainian)
- Moscow Helsinki Group

== See also ==
- LGBT rights in Ukraine
- History of the Russian language in Ukraine
- Chronology of Ukrainian language suppression
- Humanitarian situation during the war in Donbas
