= Andriy Odarchenko =

Ukrainian professor and politician

- Андрій Одарченко
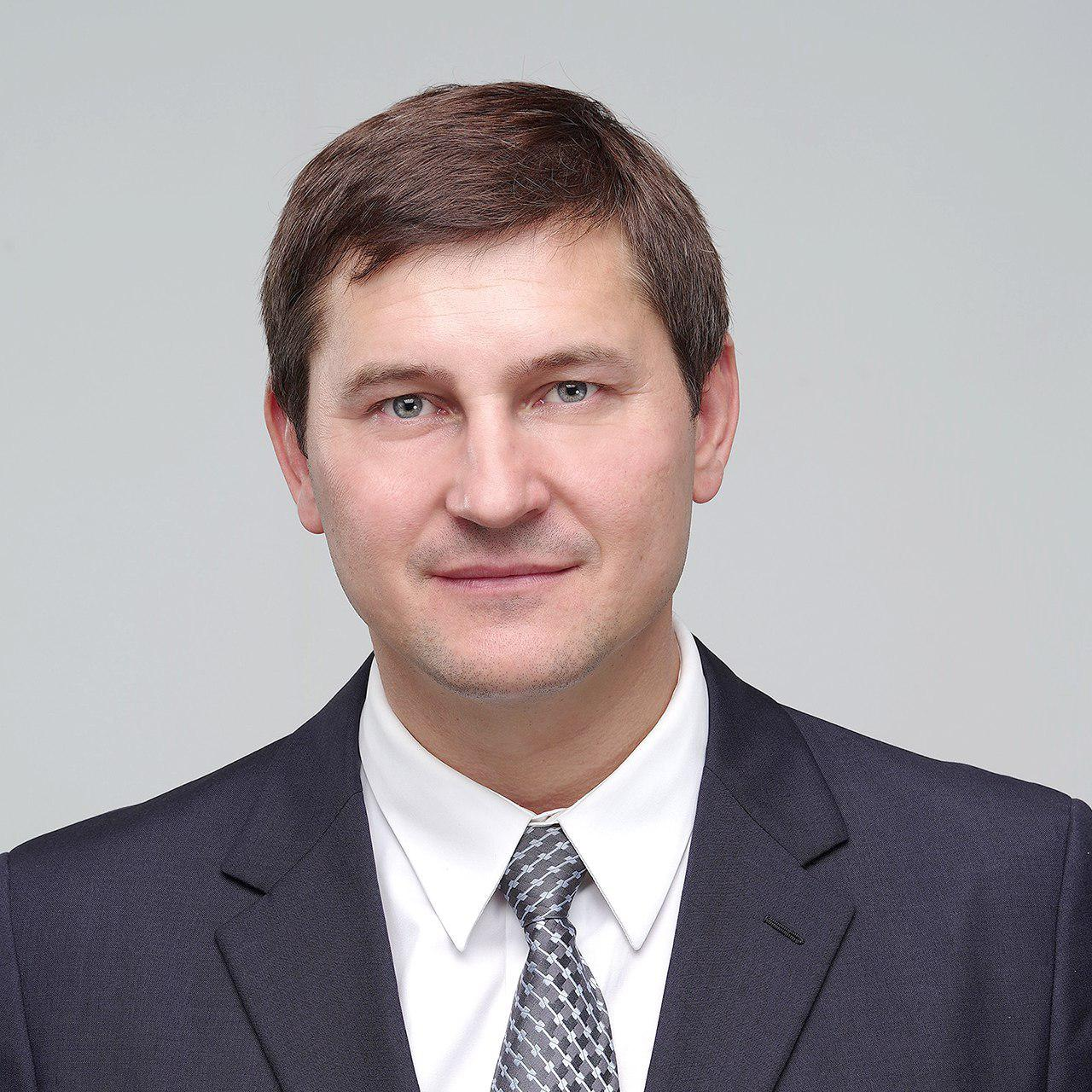

People's Deputy of Ukraine
- Incumbent
- Assumed office 29 August 2019
- Preceded by: Dmytro Svyatash
- Constituency: Kharkiv Oblast, No. 170

Personal details
- Born: 2 November 1978 (age 47) Kharkiv, Ukrainian SSR, Soviet Union (now Ukraine)
- Party: Servant of the People
- Other political affiliations: Independent
- Education: Kharkiv State University of Food Technology and Trade

Andriy Mykolaiovych Odarchenko (Ukrainian: Андрій Миколайович Одарченко; born 2 November 1978) is a Ukrainian professor and politician currently serving as a People's Deputy of Ukraine from Ukraine's 170th electoral district since 29 August 2019. He is a member of Servant of the People.

== Early life and career ==
Andriy Mykolaiovych Odarchenko was born on 2 November 1978 in the city of Kharkiv, then a part of the Ukrainian Soviet Socialist Republic within the Soviet Union. He graduated from the Kharkiv State University of Food Technology and Trade in 2000, specialising in commodity science and commercial activity. In 2013, he again graduated from the Kharkiv State University of Food Technology and Trade, this time with a master's degree in economics and enterprising. He is a Doctor of Technical Sciences.

In 2011, he began working at the Kharkiv State University of Food Technology and Trade's faculty of trade, business, and customs management as the faculty's dean. In 2015, he additionally became a professor at the university's department of merchandising, quality management, and environmental protection. In his work as a professor, Odarchenko was responsible for three people becoming Candidates of Technical Science.

On 21 November 2023, he was charged with attempting to bribe Mustafa Nayem, then head of Ukraine's State Agency for Reconstruction, by offering cryptocurrency in exchange for funds to repair a university where Odarchenko is rector. He was arrested and later released on UAH 15 million bail.

On 18 September 2024, it was announced that he had failed to appear at a scheduled court hearing and subsequently fled to Romania where he requested asylum. On 19 September, Ukraine issued an international warrant for his arrest.

On 14 November 2024, Odarchenko was convicted of attempted bribery and sentenced in absentia to eight years in prison and asset confiscation.

== Political career ==
Odarchenko ran in the 2019 Ukrainian parliamentary election as the candidate of Servant of the People in Ukraine's 170th electoral district. At the time of the election, he was an independent. He was successfully elected, winning 44.41% and therefore defeating the closest competitor, incumbent People's Deputy Dmytro Svyatash (who won 29.77% of the vote).

In the Verkhovna Rada, Odarchenko joined the Servant of the People parliamentary faction. He also joined the Verkhovna Rada Committee on Anti-Corruption Policies and the inter-factional associations Equal Rights, Blockchain4Ukraine, Odeshchyna, Anti-Raider Coalition, Slobozhanshchyna, and For Accelerated European Integration of Ukrainian Business.

Odarchenko was criticised during the COVID-19 pandemic in Ukraine by anti-corruption non-governmental organisation Chesno for delivering masks in his electoral district in what it regarded as an instance of convincing individuals to vote for him.
