= Pokalchuk =

Pokalchuk (Ukrainian: Покальчук) is a Ukrainian surname. Notable people with the surname include:

- Oksana Pokalchuk, Ukrainian lawyer and human rights activist
- Yuri Pokalchuk (1941–2008), Ukrainian writer
