= Yevhen Pyvovarov =

Ukrainian professor and politician

- Євген Пивоваров
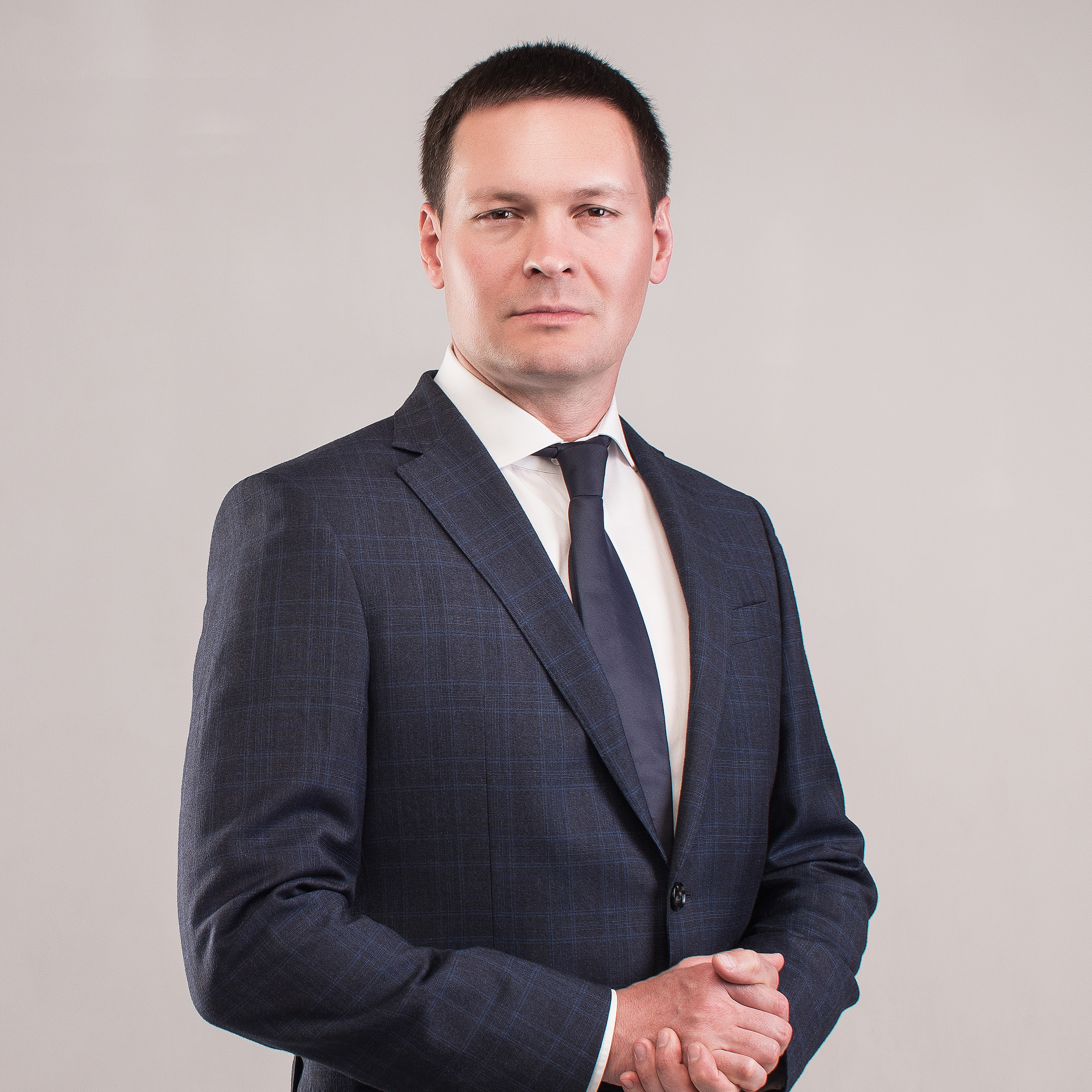
- Pyvovarov in 2019

People's Deputy of Ukraine
- Incumbent
- Assumed office 29 August 2019
- Preceded by: Volodymyr Katsuba
- Constituency: Kharkiv Oblast, No. 175

Personal details
- Born: 4 November 1978 (age 47) Kharkiv, Ukrainian SSR, Soviet Union (now Ukraine)
- Party: Servant of the People
- Other political affiliations: Independent
- Education: Kharkiv State University of Food Technology and Trade

Yevhen Pavlovych Pyvovarov (Ukrainian: Євген Павлович Пивоваров; born 4 November 1978) is a Ukrainian professor and politician currently serving as a People's Deputy of Ukraine from Ukraine's 175th electoral district since 29 August 2019. He is a member of Servant of the People.

== Early life and career ==
Yevhen Pavlovych Pyvovarov was born on 4 November 1978 in the eastern Ukrainian city of Kharkiv, then under the Soviet Union. In 1995, he graduated from lyceum, and in 2000 he graduated from Kharkiv State Academy of Food Technology and Organisation (now the Kharkiv State University of Food Technology and Trade) with a specialisation in Food Technology. In 2003, he successfully argued his dissertation and became a Candidate of Technical Sciences. In 2008, he became an associate professor, and in 2014 he became a Doctor of Technical Science.

From 2014, Pyvovarov was a professor at the Kharkiv State University of Food Technology and Trade's department of food technology. He was also on the university's academic council, and part of the Educational-Scientific Institute of Food Technology and Business. Prior to his election, he was additionally involved in youth outreach, such as anti-drug campaigns and preparing children for independent lives.

Pyvovarov has founded two food production factories: Taifun-2000 TOV and Chyhrynov TOV.

== Political career ==
In the 2019 Ukrainian parliamentary election, Pyvovarov ran as a People's Deputy of Ukraine in Ukraine's 175th electoral district. He was successfully elected, defeating incumbent People's Deputy Volodymyr Katsuba with 44.61% to Katsuba's 19.39%. At the time of the election, he was an independent. In the Verkhovna Rada (Ukraine's parliament), Pyvovarov joined the Servant of the People faction, as well as the Verkhovna Rada Energy Committee and the Verkhovna Rada Committee on Housing and Communal Services.

Pyvovarov is currently under investigation by the Commercial Court of Kharkiv Oblast for corruption, with a ₴10 million land transfer to a cooperative co-founded by Pyvovarov from Kharkiv politician Hennadiy Kernes.
