= SS Donetz =

Ships named Donetz have included the following:

- SS Donetz (1920), foundered in 1935 off Helsingfors, Finland
- SS Donetz (1937), transferred to Soviet Government in 1946 by the MOWT
