= Oleksandr Hranovskyi =

Oleksandr Hranovskyi may refer to:

- Oleksandr Hranovskyi (footballer)
- Oleksandr Hranovskyi (businessman)
- Oleksandr Hranovskyi (politician)
