= Ukraine's 169th electoral district =

Ukrainian electoral district in Kharkiv Oblast

No.169
- Single-mandate constituency
- Electoral districts of Kharkiv, Ukraine
- Oblast: Kharkiv Oblast
- Major settlements: Kyivskyi District, Kharkiv; Saltivskyi District, Kharkiv (partially)

Current single-mandate constituency
- Created: 28 April 2012
- Seats: Single MP
Current MP
Oleksandr Kunytskyi
Servant of the People (since 2019)

Electoral district 169 (Ukrainian: Одномандатний виборчий округ №169, Odnomandatnyi vyborchyi okruh №169), shortened to OVO No.169 (Ukrainian: ОВО №169) is one of the 225 electoral districts that elects a member of parliament (people's deputy) to the Verkhovna Rada, Ukraine's national parliament.

The district is located in the Kyivskyi District, Kharkiv and partially the Saltivskyi District, Kharkiv. It was created by the No. 82 decree of the Central Election Commission on 28 April 2012 (before this, a different form of electoral districts existed in the country). The election commission of this district is located in Kharkiv, at Skrypnyk Street, 7.

The 169th electoral district borders the 175th to its north, 170th, 171st, and 172nd to its east, 173rd to its south, and 168th to its west.

The district encompasses 98 polling stations.

== List of deputies ==
Name	Image	Party	Convocation	Took office	Left office	Time in office	Ref.
Iryna Berezhna		Party of Regions	7th	12 December 2012	27 November 2014	1 year, 350 days	
Oleksandr Kirsh		People's Front	8th	27 November 2014	29 August 2019	4 years, 275 days	
Oleksandr Kunytskyi		Servant of the People	9th	29 August 2019	Incumbent	7 years, 78 days	

== Elections ==
=== Parliamentary elections ===
==== 2019 ====
2019 Ukrainian parliamentary election
Party	Candidate	Votes	%	±%
Servant of the People	Oleksandr Kunytskyi	34,908	47.99	New
Independent	Oleksandr Hranovskyi	11,557	15.88	New
Independent	Oleksandr Kirsh	10,919	15.01	▼8.83
Independent	Mykhailo Ronin	3,462	4.75	New
Democratic Axe	Mykyta Soloviov	2,478	3,4	New
SiCh	Oleksandr Pylypchuk	2,455	3.37	New
Batkivshchyna	Tetiana Zakutnia	2,325	3.19	New
Svoboda	Vladyslav Kikhtiev	1,910	2.62	New
Independent	Viktoriia Vasylianska	842	1.15	New
Khvylya Civil Movement	Nina Balasanyan	812	1.11	New
Independent	Yaroslav Makarenko	305	0.41	New
Independent	Volodymyr Dobrovolskyi	303	0.41	New
Independent	Volodymyr Koval	276	0.37	New
Independent	Oleh Petrichenko	182	0.25	New
Total votes		72,734	100.0	
Servant of the People gain from Independent		Swing	▲32.11	

==== 2014 ====
2014 Ukrainian parliamentary election
Party	Candidate	Votes	%	±%
People's Front	Oleksandr Kirsh	18,574	24.71	▼9.42
Independent	Volodymyr Skorobahach	16,953	22.55	New
Independent	Oleksandr Dorovskyi	13,937	18.54	New
Independent	Stanislav Kosinov	7,781	10.35	New
Independent	Stanyslav Denysiuk	3,398	4.52	New
Independent	Mykola Tolmachov	2,827	3.76	New
Independent	Oleksandr Hava	2,174	2.89	New
Strong Ukraine	Andriy Burdov	1,997	2.65	New
Radical Party	Serhiy Babionyshev	1,758	2.33	New
Independent	Volodymyr Silevych	1,551	2.06	New
Independent	Yevhen Kosinov	1,264	1.68	New
Independent	Roman Serheniuk	1,159	1.54	New
Independent	Oleh Holovkov	962	1.27	New
Independent	Hennadiy Pozhydaiev	335	0.44	New
Independent	Oleksiy Kurtsev	271	0.36	New
Independent	Maksym Pochapskyi	218	0.29	▼1.55
Total votes		75,159	100.0	
People's Front gain from Independent		Swing	2.16	

==== 2012 ====
2012 Ukrainian parliamentary election
Party	Candidate	Votes	%	±%
Party of Regions	Iryna Berezhna	33,419	41.82	New
Batkivshchyna	Oleksandr Kirsh	27,271	34.13	New
KPU	Viktor Sydorchenko	10,929	13.67	New
Independent	Andriy Bilohryshchenko	2,897	3.62	New
Ukraine – Forward!	Ihor Stetsenko	2,262	2.83	New
Independent	Oleh Starykh	1,648	2.06	New
Independent	Maksym Pochapskyi	1,476	1.84	New
Total votes		75,159	100.0	
People's Front gain from Independent		Swing	2.16	
