= Valeriy Pysarenko =

Ukrainian politician

- Валерій Писаренко
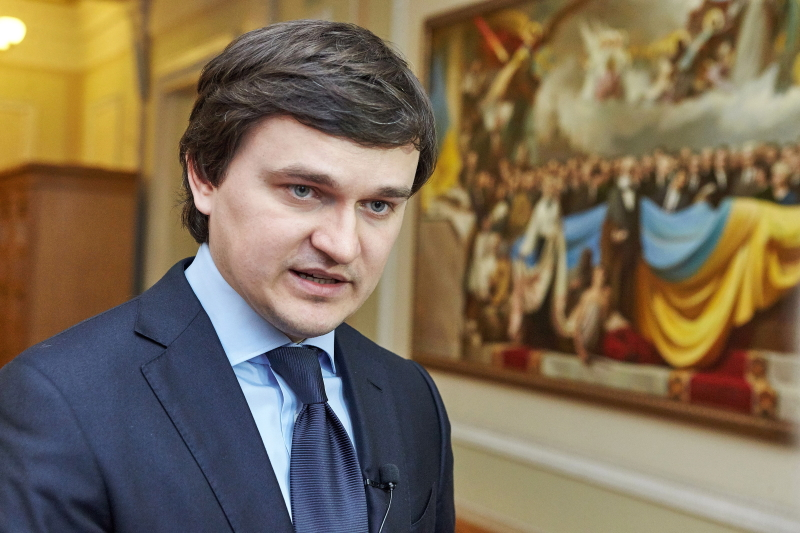
- Pysarenko in 2015
- Born: July 8, 1980 (age 46); Nova Kakhovka, Kharkiv Oblast, Ukrainian SSR, Soviet Union
- Education: Academy of Advocacy of Taras Shevchenko National University of Kyiv
- Occupations: Politician; lawyer
- Website: pysarenko.com.ua

Valeriy Volodymyrovych Pysarenko (Ukrainian: Валерій Володимирович Писаренко; born July 8, 1980) is a Ukrainian politician, nonpartisan, who was a People's Deputy of Ukraine of the 5th, 6th, 7th and 8th Convocations from 2006 until 2019. He is an Honored Lawyer of Ukraine and candidate of Juridical Sciences. In 2006 and 2007 he was elected to parliament as a candidate of Bloc Yulia Tymoshenko. Since then he has been an independent candidate.

In October 2016 he was elected as vice-chairman of the Bureau of the Group of Experts on Renewable Energy and vice-chairman of the Bureau of the Group of Experts on Energy Efficiency of the Committee on Sustainable Energy of the United Nations Economic Commission for Europe (UNECE).

== Career highlights ==
1997 – entered the Academy of Advocacy of Ukraine at the Taras Shevchenko National University of Kyiv (former Institute of Advocacy at Kyiv National University named after Taras Shevchenko).

2002 – took the oath of attorney of Ukraine and obtained the certificate of the right to practice law.

2002–2006 – made a legal career.

March 26, 2006 – firstly elected as People's Deputy of the Verkhovna Rada of Ukraine for Bloc Yulia Tymoshenko.

July 1, 2010 – became a candidate of legal sciences by specialty "Constitutional and Municipal Law".

December 17, 2010 – received the title of Honored Lawyer of Ukraine.

2011 – recognized as the Lawyer of the Year in Ukraine in the nomination "Legislator of the Year".

2010–2013 – lecturer at the Department of Constitutional Law at the Taras Shevchenko National University of Kyiv.

2011–2014 – Associate Professor of Constitutional, Municipal and International Law of V.N. Karazin Kharkiv National University.

April–May 2015 – graduated from the program "Entrepreneurship and Innovation Management" at the University of California, Berkeley.

July 2015 – graduated from the course "Geopolitics" at the Geneva Institute of geopolitical studies (GIGS).

September–October 2015 – graduated from the course "Formation of public confidence in the legislative power" at the House of Congress (Washington).

February 2016 – graduated from the John F. Kennedy School of Government at Harvard University. Business course "Leadership for the 21 century: chaos, conflict and courage".

April 2016 – graduated from the Yale School of Management (Yale SOM). The course "Sustainability as a business strategy".

October 2016 – elected for two years as vice-chairman of the Bureau of the Group of Experts on Renewable Energy and vice-chairman of the Bureau of the Group of Experts on Energy Efficiency of the Committee on Sustainable Energy of the United Nations Economic Commission for Europe (UNECE).

== Parliamentary activity ==
March 26, 2006 – elected People's Deputy of Verkhovna Rada of Ukraine elected to parliament as a candidate of Bloc Yulia Tymoshenko.

- Member of the Committee on Legal Policy.
- Chairman of the Subcommittee on organization and functioning of justice and the notary, the executive service.
- The representative of Ukraine of the Parliamentary Assembly of the Council of Europe and the Interparliamentary Assembly of the Eurasian Economic Community.

November 23, 2007 – elected as People's Deputy of the Verkhovna Rada of Ukraine of the 6th convocation again for Bloc Yulia Tymoshenko:

- Member of the Committee of the Verkhovna Rada of Ukraine on Legal Policy and Justice.
- Chairman of Subcommittee on the legal basis of the organization and activities of the executive service and response to violations of laws on enforcement of the Parliamentary Committee on Justice.
- Deputy Chairman of the Special Commission of the Verkhovna Rada of Ukraine for privatization.

In 2009 Pysarenko became a member of the parliamentary faction of the Party of Regions.

During parliamentary elections on December 12, 2012, won single-mandate constituencies No.168, Kharkiv city as an independent candidate:

- Chairman of the Committee of the Verkhovna Rada of Ukraine on Legal Policy and Justice.

October 26, 2014 – elected as People's Deputy of the Verkhovna Rada of Ukraine of the 8th convocation on majority constituency No.168, Kharkiv again as an independent candidate:

- Chairman of the interfactional association "For Kharkiv! For Slobozhanshina! "
- Member of the Committee of the Verkhovna Rada of Ukraine on Legal Policy and Justice.
- Member of the executive committee of the National Parliamentary Group in the Inter-Parliamentary Union.
- Member of Ukrainian Party of Interparliamentary Assembly of Ukraine and Poland.
- Member of the Group for Inter-parliamentary relations with People's Republic of China, the United States, Israel, Italy, Turkey, Germany.

In 2015 Pysarenko became a member of the parliamentary faction of the party Revival.

- September 21, 2016 presented in Parliament a completely new system of elections of People's Deputies to the Verkhovna Rada of Ukraine – the new Electoral Code of Ukraine.

In the 2019 Ukrainian parliamentary election Pysarenko failed to get reelected after finishing second in majority constituency No.168 (Kharkiv) (again as an independent candidate) with 24.38% after Maria Mezentseva of Servant of the People with 41.51%.

Lawmaking
Government regulations of Valeriy Pysarenko, which came into force between 2006 and 2016
2008	No. 692-VI of December 18, 2008	Law of Ukraine "On amendments to some legislative acts of Ukraine with respect to improvement of financial mechanisms for investment in housing development sector".
2009	No. 1334-VI dated May 15, 2009	Law of Ukraine "On the prohibition of gambling business in Ukraine".
2010	No. 2500-VI dated September 7, 2010	Law of Ukraine "On Amendments to the Law of Ukraine" On capital of Ukraine – Hero City Kyiv " regarding the order of formation of district councils".
2011	No. 2982-VI dated February 3, 2011	Law of Ukraine "On Amendments to the Law of Ukraine" On the Judicial System and Status of Judges " regarding special training on judicial candidates'.
2011	№ 3674-VI dated July 8, 2011	Law of Ukraine "On Court Fee".
2011	No. 4082-VI dated December 7, 2011	Law of Ukraine "On Amendments to the Code of Ukraine on Administrative Offenses with respect for violation of installation and use of special light or sound signaling devices".
2011	No. 4168-VI dated December 9, 2011	Law of Ukraine "On Amendments to Article 98 of the Law of Ukraine" On judicial system and status of judges "regarding the support of the High Qualification Commission of Judges of Ukraine".
2012	No. 5041-VI dated July 4, 2012	Law of Ukraine "On amendments to some legislative acts of Ukraine with respect to participation in the hearing in video conference mode".
2012	No. 5215-VI dated September 6, 2012	Resolution of the Verkhovna Rada of Ukraine "On changes and delimitation of Kharkiv city, Kharkiv and Dergachivskogo districts and Kharkiv region".
2012	No. 5288-VI dated September 18, 2012	Law of Ukraine "On amendments to some legislative acts of Ukraine concerning improvement of activity of public prosecution office".

== International activity ==
January 2016 – Valeriy Pysarenko participated in the World Future Energy Summit in Abu Dhabi, UAE.

July 24 – 28, 2016 – Valeriy Pysarenko attended the US Democratic National Convention in Philadelphia.

November 11, 2016 – Valeriy Pysarenko, participated in the Annual Conference of the International NGO Club of Rome.

November 2016 – Valeriy Pysarenko initiated conduction of IX International Forum "Energy for Sustainable Development" in Ukraine in 2018 ". Minister of Energy and Coal Industry of Ukraine Igor Nasalyk supported the proposal of Valeriy Pysarenko concerning the organization of the International meeting of Energy Ministers under the auspices of the United Nations in Ukraine.

December 15, 2016 – December 16, 2016 – Valeriy Pysarenko jointly with REN21 and UNECE organized and hold in Ukraine International Seminar "New opportunities for Sustainable Energy in Ukraine".

"Alternative energy – is non-competitive future for the whole planet. I, as a person, born in the Ukraine, would like my country to become a part of that future. Therefore, the development of renewable energy sources is the standard around which we'll build our future," – Valeriy Pysarenko.

January 18, 2017 – January 20, 2017 – Valeriy Pysarenko organized at UN headquarters in Geneva (Switzerland) interactive exhibition "Chernobyl. Inside." [12] dedicated to the 30th anniversary of the Chernobyl disaster and the completion of building of safe confinement over the 4th Chernobyl Unit. The exhibition was held in the framework of the 25th session of the Committee on Sustainable Energy of the United Nations Economic Commission for Europe.

"Chernobyl exploded not in Ukraine. It exploded on the Planet Earth. There are no limits for radiation, there is no salvation from it. Each nuclear power plant in the world is a red button. No one knows when it is pressed again. How many fates should be sacrificed to make understandable for us that our salvation is in the transition to energy of solar, wind, biomass. Renewable energy is a white button for mankind," – Valeriy Pysarenko.

The exhibition consists of two photo projects of Ukrainian artists "When sin is not clear, there is no fault more ..." by Yurii Kosin and "Prypyat Mon Amour" by Alina Rudia. The exhibition was also presented a virtual documentary film about Chernobyl "Chernobyl VR" by Polish developers of The Farm 51. Wearing VR-glasses, you can go for an interactive journey and see the new Confinement at Chernobyl – an enormous engineering construction higher than Wembley stadium, you can walk on the abandoned school, amusement park and other objects in Pripyat.

March 20 – 21, 2017 – Valeriy Pysarenko represented Ukraine at the International Conference on energy issues "Berlin Energy Transition Dialogie – towards a global Energiewende", in Berlin, Germany.

March 28 – April 12, 2017 – Valeriy Pysarenko as a part of in the Ukrainian delegation represented Ukraine in Beijing (China) in International Seminar "Energy Strategy for the Belt and Road Countries".

29 May – June 2, 2017 – Valeriy Pysarenko participated in Singapore Cooperation Programme in Course "Singapore's Anti-Corruption Strategies" in Singapore Civil Service College.

== Social commitment ==
April 3, 2011 – Valeriy Pysarenko created Ukrainian public organization "New Frontiers" and is its Honorary President.

In 2016 the NGO "New Frontiers" celebrated its fifth anniversary.

In 2016 the NGO "New Frontiers" first in Kharkiv started work on enforcing of Sustainable Development Goals, approved by the United Nations into youth lives.

November 11, 2016 – "New Frontiers" got the victory in the contest of the UN Office in Ukraine#onedayonegoal, dedicated Sustainable Development Goals – 2030.

In December 2016 "New Frontiers" began working on an educational project of the United Nations, as part of Sustainable Development Goals, "The World's Largest Lesson".

== Awards and achievements ==
December 17, 2010 – Honored Lawyer of Ukraine.

2011 – recognized as Lawyer of the Year in Ukraine in the nomination "Legislator of the Year".
