= Irina Berezhna =

Ukrainian politician (1980–2017)

Iryna Berezhna
- Ірина Бережна
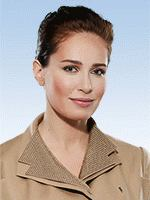
- Official Verkhovna Rada portrait, 2012

People's Deputy of Ukraine
- Constituency: Party of Regions, No. 151; (2007–2012); Kharkiv Oblast, No. 169; (2012–2014)

Personal details
- Born: 13 August 1980 Voroshylovhrad, Ukrainian SSR, Soviet Union
- Died: 5 August 2017 (aged 36) Zadar County, Croatia
- Party: Party of Regions
- Children: 1
- Website: berezhnaya.com.ua (Archived 5 August 2017)

Iryna Hryhorivna Berezhna (Ukrainian: Ірина Григорівна Бережна; Russian: Ирина Григорьевна Бережная, romanized: Irina Grigoriyevna Berezhnaya; 13 August 1980 – 5 August 2017) was a Ukrainian politician from the Party of Regions who served as a People's Deputy of Ukraine from 2007 to 2014.

== Early life and career ==
Berezhna was born in 1980 in Voroshylovhrad (present-day Luhansk), in what was then the Soviet Union. In 2002, she graduated from the Taras Shevchenko National University of Kyiv with a specialisation in jurisprudence.

In 2009, she graduated from the National Academy for Public Administration under the President of Ukraine with a degree in public administration.

After training in her major, as provided by applicable law, in January 2004, she successfully passed the qualification exam, received a license for notarial activities, and worked as a trainee notary in Kyiv.

During the training (2000–2002) Berezhna worked as an assistant-consultant of the Chairman of the Subcommittee on legislation, systematization of legislation and its conformity with international law, the Committee on Legal Policy of the Verkhovna Rada (parliament of Ukraine).

In 1999, she opened her first business, a travel agency. In 2004, she became the Deputy Director for Legal Affairs at LLC law firm Astra-Service.

In 2008, her notary office received a professional award, "European quality" of European Business Association (Oxford, United Kingdom). Until November 2007, Iryna Berezhna was a private notary in Kyiv city notarial district.

=== Scientific and public activities ===
In July 2007, Berezhna received her Ph.D. in law. She was also the author of several publications on law and notarial practice in the legal and business editions. She was a member of the Ukrainian Bar Association. She worked closely with the Association of Lawyers of Ukraine, the Chamber of Notaries, and the European Business Association. She was also known for her pro-Russian and Eurosceptic views. She was an awardee of the all-Ukrainian prize "Woman of the 3rd Millennium".

== Political career ==
Berezhna was elected as a People's Deputy of Ukraine from the Party of Regions in the 2007 Ukrainian parliamentary election as the 151st candidate on the party's proportional representative list.

- Chairman of the Subcommittee on rights, freedoms, and interests of citizens and systematizing, an adaptation of Ukraine's legislation to international legal standards in the field of justice and the status of judges of the Supreme Rada of Ukraine Committee on Justice
- Member of the Ukrainian part of the Committee on Parliamentary Cooperation between Ukraine and the European Union
- Head of the Group for interparliamentary relations with the Hashemite Kingdom of Jordan
- Member of the Group for Interparliamentary Relations with the Republic of Algeria
- Member of the Group for Interparliamentary Relations with the United States of America
- Member of the Group for Interparliamentary Relations with Poland
- Member of the Group for Interparliamentary Relations with Russia
- Member of the Group for Interparliamentary Relations with the Republic of Korea
- Member of the Group for Interparliamentary Relations with the United Kingdom of Great Britain and Northern Ireland
- Member of the Group for Interparliamentary Relations with the Federal Republic of Germany

In the 2012 Ukrainian parliamentary election, Berezhna representing the Party of Regions, won Ukraine's 169th electoral district (located in Kharkiv Oblast) with 41.82% of the vote. She did not participate in the 2014 parliamentary election.

== Personal life ==
Berezhna had a daughter Daniella, born in 2009. It is not officially known who the father of Daniella is; although Ukrainian media reports claim it is businessman Boris Fuksman.

== Death and funeral ==
Iryna Berezhna died on 5 August 2017 in a car accident near the Adriatic Sea coast of Croatia.

The driver lost control, and the car went off the winding road. Her daughter survived. Ukrainian newspaper Fakty, citing Croatian portal zadarski.slobodnadalmacija.hr, wrote that the incident took place in the middle of the night at 01:30 on a highway between the Croatian port village Maslenica and a small settlement Posedarje along the bay Novigradsko more. Two others perished in the crash: a female of 37 and a 38-year-old male, a citizen of Bulgaria.

A Mercedes with a Bulgarian license plate was driving towards Posedarje, but for unknown reasons, left the road and ran into a pole. As a result of the road incident, an 8-year-old child in the car was injured. The girl was taken to a hospital in the city of Zadar.

On 10 August 2017, in the Refectory Church of the Kyiv Pechersk Lavra, a memorial service was held, which was attended by a number of politicians and celebrities, including People's Deputies Dmytro Dobkin Nestor Shufrych, Hanna Herman, Davyd Zhvania, Mykola Martynenko, Ihor Huzhva, Olha Freimut, Svetlana Loboda, and others.

According to Strana.ua, Berezhna's daughter was to be fostered by Boris Fuksman. Berezhna was buried the same day at Zvirynets Cemetery.
