= Natalia Donets =

Ukrainian politician

- Наталія Донець
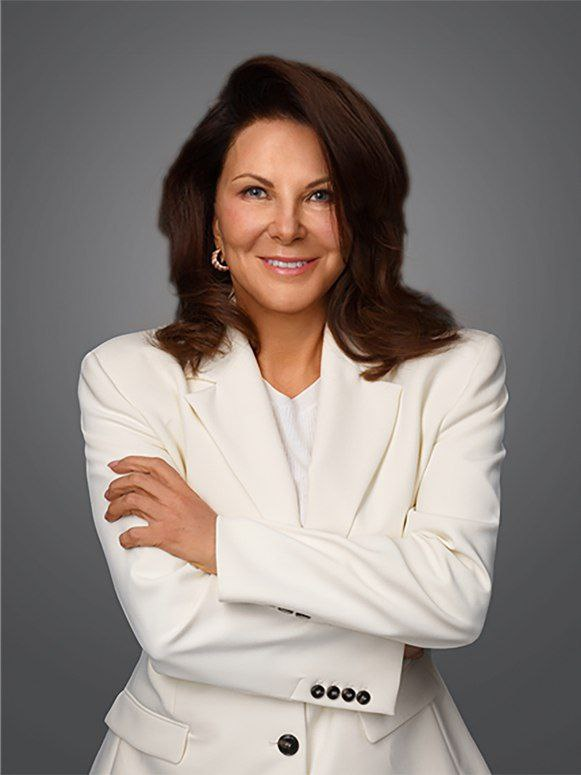
- Donets in c. 2025

People's Deputy of Ukraine
- In office 12 May 1998 – 12 May 2002

Personal details
- Born: 23 May 1957 (age 69) Novomoskovsk, Ukrainian SSR, Soviet Union
- Party: Hromada
- Children: Tetiana Donets
- Education: Dnipropetrovsk State University (1979); Kharkiv Institute of Public Catering (1987)

Natalia Hryhorivna Donets (Ukrainian: Наталія Григорівна Донець; born 23 May 1957) is a Ukrainian politician who served as a People's Deputy of Ukraine of the 3rd convocation.

== Early life and education ==
Donets was born on 23 May 1957 to Anatoly and Natalia Donets in Novomoskovsk, Dnipropetrovsk Oblast. She graduated from Dnipropetrovsk State University in 1979 and Kharkiv Institute of Public Catering in 1987.

== Professional career ==
Donets was an educator of a children's plant from 1974 to 1979. From 1979 to 1982, she was a professor of chemistry at Moscow State Technical University. In 1982, she became a chemical engineer, senior engineer-technologist of the laboratory, teacher of technology at the Dnipropetrovsk Technological and Economic College. From 1987 to 1994, she was head of the Laboratory of the Dnipropetrovsk Regional Consumers' Union. From 1994 to 1996, she served as director of the Astoria Hotel, Dnipro. Since 1996, she is a director and chairman of the supervisory board, chairman of the audit committee of Privatservice LLC. chairman of the board of CJSC "Privatservice", Dnipro.

== Political career ==
Donets served as a People's Deputy of Ukraine of the 3rd convocation from 12 May 1998 to 14 May 2002 representing the Hromada party, No. 18 on the list. At the time of the election, she was Chairman of the Board of CJSC "Privatservice" (Dnipro) and a member of the All-Ukrainian Association "Community". During her time as a deputy, she was a member of the Hromada faction (May 1998 - February 2000), non-factional (February - March 2000), member of the Labor Ukraine group (from March 2000). member of the Control Commission on Privatization (from July 1998) and member of the Budget Committee (July 1998 - March 2000).

== Personal life ==
Donets is the mother of Tetiana Donets, who served as a deputy on the seventh and eighth convocation.
