= Dmytro Svyatash =

Ukrainian activist and politician

- Дмитро Святаш
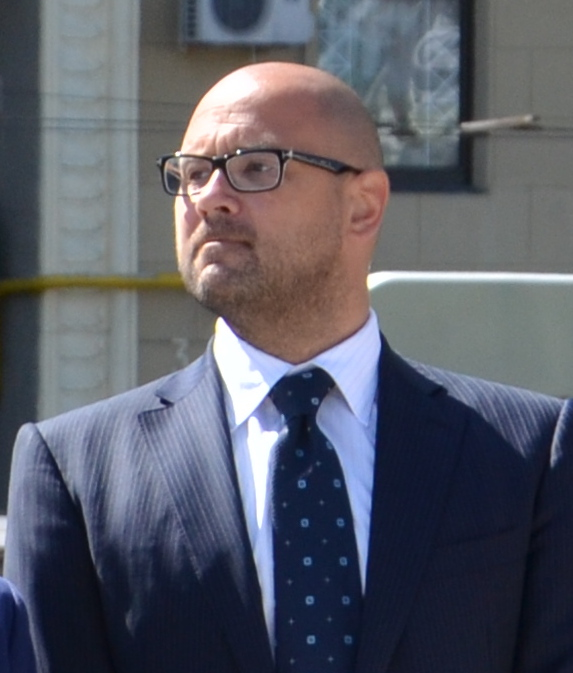
- Svyatash in 2012

People's Deputy of Ukraine

7th and 8th convocations
- In office 27 November 2014 – 29 August 2019
- Preceded by: Office established
- Succeeded by: Andriy Odarchenko
- Constituency: Ukraine's 170th electoral district

Personal details
- Born: 15 July 1971 (age 55) Kharkiv, Ukrainian SSR, Soviet Union
- Party: Party of Regions
- Website: www.svyatash.org

Dmytro Volodymyrovych Svyatash (Ukrainian: Дмитро Володимирович Святаш; born 15 June 1971) is a Ukrainian activist and politician, member of Party of Regions. From May 2002 to July 2019, he served as a member of the Verkhovna Rada. Due to criminal proceedings in 2019 fled to Russia. During Russo-Ukrainian War he is considering by Russian political circles as a potential "Gauleiter" of Slobozhanshchyna.

As of October 2026 he is being detained by Swedish authorities. He was arrested 27 October when he arrived at a Swedish airport, in a private jet.

== Life ==
Svyatash was born in Kharkiv in 1971 in a family of doctor Vladimir Nikolaevich Svyatash. His family lives in Kharkiv from the postwar years. In 1988, Dmitriy graduated the high school № 1 named after Lenin. In 1994, he graduated the Kharkiv Medical Institute, specializing in pediatrics. In 2001, he completed his studies as a lawyer at the National Yaroslav Mudry Law Academy. A year earlier, Svyatash graduated economic at the Institute for Advanced Studies and Retraining heavy machinery. Then in 2007, he graduated the Kharkiv Regional Institute on Public Administration degree.

== Political career ==
In the 2002 Ukrainian parliamentary election, gaining 24% of the votes, Svyatash was elected as a deputy of Ukraine from 171 majority district (Moskovskyi District of Kharkiv). He became a member of the Committee on Finance and Banking. In the 2004 Ukrainian presidential election, he was a trustee of presidential candidate Viktor Yanukovych. In 2005 Svyatash became a member of the Party of Regions. In 2006, he became Vice-Chairman of the Committee on Finance and Banking. After the 2007 parliamentary elections in the ranks of Party of Regions, he becomes the head of the subcommittee on taxation of non-market financial institutions and entities of the stock market of the Committee on Taxation and Customs Policy.

On February 18, 2014, Svyatash was under suspicion of wanting to leave the country, when protesters of the Euromaidan movement refused him entry to his house, and brought him to nearby Bertuk. (https://www.youtube.com/watch?v=1YtelP6DPBE)

In the 2014 Ukrainian parliamentary election, Svyatash was re-elected into the Ukrainian parliament as a non-partisan after winning a majority district 171 seat in Kharkiv with 34.01% of the votes.

In the 2019 Ukrainian parliamentary election Svyatash lost re-election as an Opposition Platform — For Life candidate in his Kharkiv single-seat constituency 170. He gained second place with 29.77% of the vote, finishing second after winner Andriy Odarchenko (with 44.41% of the votes).
