= Ukraine's 170th electoral district =

Ukrainian electoral district in Kharkiv Oblast

No.170
- Single-mandate constituency
- Electoral districts of Kharkiv, Ukraine
- Oblast: Kharkiv Oblast
- Major settlements: Saltivskyi District, Kharkiv

Current single-mandate constituency
- Created: 28 April 2012
- Seats: Single MP
Current MP
Vacant
(since 2025)

Electoral district 170 (Ukrainian: Одномандатний виборчий округ №170, Odnomandatnyi vyborchyi okruh №170), shortened to OVO No.170 (Ukrainian: ОВО №170) is one of the 225 electoral districts that elects a member of parliament (people's deputy) to the Verkhovna Rada, Ukraine's national parliament.

The district is located in the Saltivskyi District, Kharkiv. It was created in its current form by the No. 82 decree of the Central Election Commission on 28 April 2012 (before this, a different form of electoral districts existed in the country). The election commission of this district is located in Kharkiv, Yuriivska Street, 8.

The 170th electoral district borders the 169th to its west and north, 172nd to its east, and southeast, 171st to its north, and 173rd to its northwest.

The district encompasses 82 polling stations.

== List of deputies ==
Name	Image	Party	Convocation	Took office	Left office	Time in office	Ref.
Dmytro Svyatash		Party of Regions	7th	12 December 2012	27 November 2014	1 year, 350 days	
Dmytro Svyatash		Independent	8th	27 November 2014	29 August 2019	4 years, 275 days	
Andriy Odarchenko		Servant of the People	9th	29 August 2019	10 October 2025	6 years, 42 days	

== Elections ==
=== Parliamentary elections ===
==== 2019 ====
2019 Ukrainian parliamentary election
Party	Candidate	Votes	%	±%
Servant of the People	Andriy Odarchenko	31,681	44.41	New
Opposition Platform	Dmytro Svyatash	21,238	29.77	▼4.24
Independent	Andriy Kolos	4,584	6.42	New
European Solidarity	Oleksandr Tokar	4,364	6.11	New
Independent	Kostiantyn Nemichev	2,511	3.52	New
Independent	Oksana Bakumenko	1,807	2.53	New
SiCh	Akop Kazaryan	1,417	1.98	New
Samopomich	Andriy Ivanov	946	1.32	New
Independent	Andriy Didenko	836	1.17	New
Independent	Valeriy Nesteruk	763	1.06	New
Khvylya Civil Movement	Oleksandr Kravtsov	360	0.50	New
Independent	Tetiana Prokhorenko	298	0.41	New
Independent	Ahamirza Nuriev	236	0.33	New
Independent	Denys Karpinskyi	159	0.22	New
Independent	Iryna Sahutdinova	131	0.18	New
Total votes		71,331	100.0	
Servant of the People gain from Opposition Platform		Swing	▼14.64	

==== 2014 ====
2014 Ukrainian parliamentary election
Party	Candidate	Votes	%	±%
Independent	Dmytro Svyatash	23,289	34.01	▼4.38
Petro Poroshenko Bloc	Anatoliy Rodzynskyi	11,193	16.34	New
Samopomich	Oleksandr Kotukov	8,093	11.82	▼1.12
Batkivshchyna	Liliia Avdieieva	6,140	8.96	▼11.74
People's Front	Roman Protopopov	4,039	5.89	New
Strong Ukraine	Anatoliy Lunin	4,037	5.89	New
DA	Nadiia Savynska	2,137	3.12	New
Independent	Serhiy Karpenko	1,779	2.59	New
Bloc of Left Forces of Ukraine	Roman Stadnik	1,322	1.93	New
Independent	Anatoliy Rodzinskyi	1,033	1.50	New
Independent	Kateryna Shcherbyna	873	1.27	New
Independent	Dmytro Drobot	821	1.19	New
Independent	Serhiy Savchenko	619	0.90	New
Independent	Olha Yukhnova	522	0.76	New
Independent	Serhiy Toloknieiev	497	0.72	New
Independent	Viacheslav Fomenko	488	0.71	New
Independent	Danylo Khulapov	364	0.53	New
Independent	Oleksiy Sadykov	332	0.48	New
Independent	Tetiana Kliukovska	287	0.41	New
Independent	Oleh Shvedov	273	0.39	New
Independent	Oleksandr Shulhin	201	0.29	New
Independent	Dmytro Usmanov	120	0.17	New
Total votes			100.0	
Independent gain from Petro Poroshenko Bloc		Swing	▼17.67	

==== 2012 ====
2012 Ukrainian parliamentary election
Party	Candidate	Votes	%	±%
Party of Regions	Dmytro Svyatash	29,509	38.39	New
KPU	Alla Oleksandrovska	17,027	22.15	New
Batkivshchyna	Liliia Avdieieva	15,910	20.70	New
UDAR	Oleksandr Kotukov	9,950	12.94	New
Ukraine – Forward!	Anatoliy Tarasenko	1,965	2.55	New
SPU	Anatoliy Sereda	1,406	1.82	New
Independent	Ihor Karaban	1,086	1.41	New
Total votes		76,853	100.0	New
Party of Regions gain from Batkivshchyna		Swing	16.24	
