= Secret detention centers of SBU =

Secret prisons of the SBU were secret detention facilities operated by the Security Service of Ukraine (SBU) in Eastern Ukraine to incarcerate suspected Russian-backed separatists during the war in Donbas.

== Background ==
According to reports of the UN monitoring mission in Ukraine, Amnesty International and Human Rights Watch the practice of unacknowledged detention was sometimes accompanied by torture and various forms of human rights abuses. As of 2016, the Ukrainian authorities refused to acknowledge the existence of the prisons, but the enforced disappearances kept happening when Ukrainian security forces detained people and tried to conceal their fate.

== Investigative history ==
A first evidence of enforced disappearances in Eastern Ukraine committed by the Security Service of Ukraine was reported by the Office of the High Commissioner for Human Rights (OHCHR, United Nations) in August 2014.

In 2015, the UN monitoring mission in Ukraine published testimonies of detainees, who were held incommunicado in a secret SBU detention facility located in Kharkiv. The SBU denied the allegations.

An official report of the UN, Amnesty International and Human Rights Watch issued in 2016 presented nine cases of unlawful, unacknowledged detention in SBU premises in Kharkiv, Izyum, Kramatorsk, and Mariupol. The investigation revealed that Ukrainian forces, including members of volunteer battalions, held civilians in prolonged, secret captivity. Later the detained individuals were handed over to the Security Service of Ukraine. During the incarceration the detainees were tortured, beaten, subjected to electric shocks, threatened with sexual abuse, execution, and retaliation against family members in order to retrieve their confessions. Eventually some of them were transferred into a regular criminal justice system, some other ones were later exchanged for people captured by the rebel forces or released without trial.

By August 2016 the Office of the High Commissioner for Human Rights made a conclusion that "Ukrainian authorities have allowed the deprivation of liberty of individuals in secret for prolonged periods of time".

For example, one of the prisoners, Mykola Vakaruk, spent in the custody more than 600 days, suffering from repeated beatings and freezing cold. As a result of improper conditions he lost a kidney. Being in hospital he was forced to adopt a fake identity before undergoing kidney surgery. Finally he was released with compensation around ₴100 (less than $4).

In 2018, Human Rights Watch and Amnesty International said that the victims of arbitrary detention in government-controlled secret prisons in Eastern Ukraine continued to face new, serious obstacles to justice.

== See also ==
- Crimes of the Tornado battalion case
