= Ukraine's 175th electoral district =

No.175
- Single-mandate constituency
- Electoral districts of Kharkiv Oblast, Ukraine
- Oblast: Kharkiv Oblast
- Major settlements: Liubotyn

Current single-mandate constituency
- Created: 28 April 2012
- Seats: Single MP
Current MP
Yevhen Pyvovarov
Servant of the People (since 2019)

Electoral district 175 (Ukrainian: Одномандатний виборчий округ №175, Odnomandatnyi vyborchyi okruh №175), shortened to OVO No.175 (Ukrainian: ОВО №175) is one of 225 electoral districts that elects a member of parliament (people's deputy) to the Verkhovna Rada, Ukraine's national parliament.

The district is located in Odesa Oblast. It was created in its current form by the No. 82 decree of the Central Election Commission on 28 April 2012 (before this, a different form of electoral districts existed in the country). The electoral commission of the district operates in the Derhachi district cultural building of Derhachi, Victory Avenue, 1.

The electoral district encompasses Liubotyn, as well as the now-abolished Derhachi Raion (now part of Kharkiv Raion). The 175th electoral district borders the 176th to its east, the 181st, 172nd, 171st, 169th, 168th, and 174th to its south, 180th to its east, and the Russia–Ukraine border to its north.

== List of deputies ==
Name	Image	Party	Convocation	Took office	Left office	Time in office	Ref.
Volodymyr Katsuba		Party of Regions	7th	12 December 2012	27 November 2014	1 year, 350 days	
Volodymyr Katsuba		Independent	8th	27 November 2014	29 August 2019	4 years, 275 days	
Yevhen Pyvovarov		Servant of the People	9th	29 August 2019	Incumbent	7 years, 44 days	

== Elections ==
=== Parliamentary elections ===
==== 2019 ====
2019 Ukrainian parliamentary election
Party	Candidate	Votes	%	±%
Servant of the People	Yevhen Pyvovarov	30,405	44.61	New
Opposition Bloc	Volodymyr Katsuba	13,217	19.39	▼16.32
Opposition Platform	Andriy Lazurenko	8,503	12.47	New
Holos	Viktor Kysil	4,746	6.96	New
Independent	Viacheslav Zadorenko	4,129	6.05	New
PSh	Danylo Kalashnykov	2,046	3.00	New
Independent	Anatoliy Banhen	1,558	2.28	New
Svoboda	Denys Korniyenko	1,310	1.92	New
Radical Party	Hanna Yastrebova	1,285	1.88	▼2.41
Independent	Serhii Fesenko	567	0.83	New
Independent	Karen Aleksanian	377	0.55	New
Total votes		68,143	100.0	
Servant of the People gain from Opposition Bloc		Swing	▲25.22	

==== 2014 ====
2014 Ukrainian parliamentary election
Party	Candidate	Votes	%	±%
Independent	Volodymyr Katsuba	20,748	35.17	▼19.67
People's Front	Serhii Kuzan	9,713	16.46	New
Independent	Mykola Vereteinikov	5,870	9.95	New
Independent	Oleksiy Lytvynov	4,286	7.26	New
KPU	Volodymyr Vasylynenko	3,918	6.64	▼4.74
Independent	Volodymyr Bezruk	2,634	4.46	New
Radical Party	Serhii Nesterenko	2,535	4.29	New
Strong Ukraine	Viktor Nikulenko	2,491	4.22	New
Independent	Valeriy Holovko	2,055	3.48	New
Independent	Oleksandr Kvashnin	1,361	2.30	New
Independent	Oleksandr Kukhar	1,098	1.86	New
Independent	Roman Leonov	890	1.50	New
Independent	Yurii Laptiy	874	1.48	New
Independent	Volodymyr Nikolenko	520	0.88	New
Total votes		58,993	100.0	▼17,179
Independent gain from People's Front		Swing	▼19.25	

==== 2012 ====
2012 Ukrainian parliamentary election
Party	Candidate	Votes	%	±%
Party of Regions	Volodymyr Katsuba	41,780	54.84	New
Batkivshchyna	Ivan Varchenko	14,854	19.50	New
KPU	Volodymyr Bezruchenko	8,673	11.38	New
UDAR	Yuriy Korobka	7,845	10.29	New
Independent	Viktoria Tretiak	3,020	3.96	New
Total votes		76,172	100.0	New
Party of Regions gain from Batkivshchyna		Swing	35.34	

=== Presidential elections ===
==== 2019 ====
2019 Ukrainian presidential election
Party	Candidate	Votes	%	±%
Servant of the People	Volodymyr Zelenskyy	36,594	40.13	New
Opposition Platform	Yuriy Boyko	22,983	25.20	
Batkivshchyna	Yulia Tymoshenko	7,481	8.20	
Petro Poroshenko Bloc	Petro Poroshenko	7,304	8.01	
Opposition Bloc	Oleksandr Vilkul	4,911	5.38	
Civil Position	Anatoliy Hrytsenko	3,082	3.38	
SiCh	Ihor Smeshko	2,790	3.06	
Radical Party	Oleh Liashko	2,774	3.04	
Total votes		91,173	100.0	▲36,467
Servant of the People gain from Opposition Platform		Swing	14.93	

==== 2014 ====
2014 Ukrainian presidential election
Party	Candidate	Votes	%	±%
UDAR	Petro Poroshenko	18,915	34.57	
Party of Regions	Mykhailo Dobkin	16,213	29.63	
Strong Ukraine	Serhiy Tihipko	4,392	8.02	
Batkivshchyna	Yulia Tymoshenko	3,973	7.26	
Civil Position	Anatoliy Hrytsenko	2,602	4.75	
Independent	Vadim Rabinovich	1,992	3.64	
Radical Party	Oleh Liashko	1,652	3.01	
Independent	Olha Bohomolets	1,131	2.06	
KPU	Petro Symonenko	1,114	2.03	
Total votes		54,706	100.0	
UDAR gain from Party of Regions		Swing	4.94	
