= Oleksandr Kunytskyi =

Israeli-Ukrainian blogger, entrepreneur, and politician

- Олександр Куницький
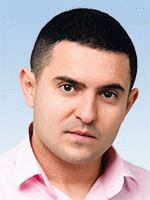
- Official portrait, 2019

People's Deputy of Ukraine
- Incumbent
- Assumed office 28 August 2019
- Preceded by: Oleksandr Kirsh
- Constituency: Kharkiv Oblast, No. 169

Personal details
- Born: 25 August 1983 (age 42) Zaporizhzhia, Ukrainian SSR, Soviet Union (now Ukraine)
- Citizenship: Ukraine, Israel
- Party: Servant of the People
- Other political affiliations: Independent
- Occupation: blogger, private entrepreneur, politician

Oleksandr Olehovych Kunytskyi (Ukrainian: Олександр Олегович Куницький; born 25 August 1983) is a Ukrainian and Israeli blogger, private entrepreneur, and politician. He is People's Deputy of Ukraine of 9th convocation as a member of Servant of the People party. He is also known as ZP Sanek. He used this nickname during the election.

== Biography ==
He has vocational education. He studied at Vocational and Technical Education center No 6 in Zaporizhzhia (Confectionery specialization).

He is a head of Chystyi Kharkiv (Clean Kharkiv) public organization.

According to media, apart from Ukrainian citizenship, Kunytskyi has also Israeli citizenship. As of 29 August 2019, he was wanted by police because of a fight with the ATO participant.

Kunytskyi has been included into the database of the Myrotvorets site due to violation of the legislation of Ukraine on citizenship by obtaining a second citizenship, which is not allowed in Ukraine. According to Article 19 of the Ukrainian Law on Citizenship, the voluntary acquisition by a citizen of Ukraine of citizenship of another state is the basis for losing Ukrainian citizenship.

== Political career ==
Kunytskyi was People's Deputy candidate as a member of Servant of the People party in the 2019 parliamentary elections (constituency No 169, Kyiv district, part of the Moscow district of Kharkiv). In the constituency, Kunytskyi gained 47.99% of the total vote. At the time of the election, he was a non-partisan individual entrepreneur, living in Kharkiv.

He is a member of the Verkhovna Rada committee on law enforcement, a co-chair of the group for Interparliamentary relations with the State of Israel, and a head of the group for Interparliamentary relations with the Republic of Peru.

He is a member of Servant of the People.

According to the journalists of the Radio Liberty, Kunytskyi uses his parliamentary mandate for his personal interests related to his business, "Autoenterprise" company, which is one of the key players in the electric car market in Ukraine. The People's Deputy is engaged in advertising of business that contradicts provisions of the Constitution of Ukraine. The head of the company Dmytro Nikonov stated that Kunytskyi was his business partner while being a People's Deputy.

== Scandals and sociopolitical activities ==
Kunytskyi became known as an activist of Road Control initiative under the nickname ZP Sanek as the owner of a YouTube channel. Together with his friend Vitaliy Kosenko, he acted in the Zaporizhzhia-Dnipro-Kherson-Mykolaiv-Odesa area.

His partners in Road Control, including Rostyslav Shaposhnykov, the organization's leader, accused Kunytskyi and Kosenko of working for the Ministry of Internal Affairs under the guise of "soft opposition" and of "raids" on certain State Automobile Inspection officials and employees. Victims have repeatedly accused Kunytskyi-Kosenko of blackmailing and money extortion.

In particular, such a conflict with businessman Andriy Galenko led to the trial, and Kunytskyi was a defendant in the case when he already was a deputy. During 2019–2020, the case investigation continued, according to which Kunytskyi and Vitaliy Kosenko had to pay Galenko ₴450,000 of compensation for spreading false videos on the Internet.

Oleksandr Shatsky, then the prosecutor of the Zaporizhzhia region, was also blackmailed by Kosenko.

At night on 26 January 2016, in the city of Zaporizhzhia, Kunytskyi's partner Kosenko was arrested while receiving a $1,500 bribe from the police for not distributing a video compromising officers online. This is part of the amount of €6,000 that Kosenko requested, according to the police. The relevant video with the fact of receiving the first part of the bribe was spread by the media. In the summer of June 21, 2016, the Komunarskyi District Court of Zaporizhzhia found Vitaliy Kosenko guilty of extortion (Part 1 of Article 189 of the Criminal Code of Ukraine) and sentenced him to 3 years of imprisonment with a probation period of 12 months.

== Attitude towards the war with Russia and political activity in 2014-2018 ==
In July 2014, Kunytskyi went to the already occupied Crimea with unknown intentions. However, in the liberated territories, he did not criticize the occupation authorities and the newly created occupation system of the State Tax Service and in addition, in the video he posted, he recognized Crimea as a Russian territory. The most scandalous was a video shot by him in July 2014 entitled "Neither police nor militsiya of Crimea".

At the same time, from the spring of 2014 to 2016, in the territories controlled by Ukraine, Kunytskyi and Kosenko launched an aggressive campaign to discredit the checkpoints created for security reasons. During their "raids", they captured these objects with unknown intentions, provoking the Ukrainian military and volunteers into conflict. Such activities of Road Control activists were actively used by Kremlin propagandists. In particular, self-defenders from the checkpoints called Kunytskyi and Kosenko "Kremlin agents." In April 2014, Kosenko tried to provoke the conflict on departure from Mykolaiv. A similar conflict arose at the same time with Oleshky's self-defenders.

During the Battle of Ilovaisk, Oleksandr Kunytskyi left for Israel, where, in particular, in a stream dated 24 August 2014, he said that as a citizen of Israel, he was ready to swear an oath to the Israeli army again and serve it. Despite he had the Israeli passport for long, Kunytskyi hid the fact of his citizenship, including during the 2019 parliamentary elections in Ukraine.

After returning to Ukraine after the end of the hot phase of the war with Russia in April 2015, he provoked another conflict with the checkpoint on Khortytsia.

In 2017, Kunytskyi repeated the conflict on Khortytsia with one of the self-defenders of the checkpoint, Ruslan Venzhega. Because of this, criminal proceedings were opened, however, O. Kunytsky did not visit him.

For his activities, Kunytskyi was included in the Myrotvorets database.

== Post-election scandals ==
During the 2019 elections, Kunytskyi was actively promoting Oleksandr Dubinsky. They still have ties, and journalists of the Radio Liberty claim him an active representative of the group of Ihor Kolomoyskyi oligarch.

After Kunytskyi entered the Verkhovna Rada, he actively lobbied for the interests of Russian business in Ukraine in the supply of gas-balloon equipment for cars. It was stated in the investigation of Slidstvo.info journalists. In particular, already as a People's Deputy, Kunytsky developed business relations with the Ashrafyan and Kostanyan families. Kunytskyi was also caught using the deputy's powers to lobby for his own business of charging stations for electric cars. In particular, the Schemes program by Radio Liberty proved Kunytskyi has business ties with businessman Dmytro Nikonov in the Autoenterprise company. At the same time, Nikonov became the assistant to Kunytskyi. Also, the journalist crew of the Schemes program showed Kunytskyi's use of an electric car Nissan Leaf, which he rents from the Autoenterprise company, which he is a co-owner of.
