= Tetiana Donets =

Ukrainian politician

- Тетяна Донець
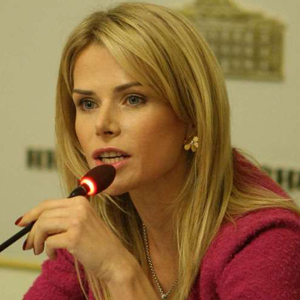
- Donets in 2016

People's Deputy of Ukraine
- In office 12 December 2012 – 29 August 2019

Personal details
- Born: 11 July 1980 (age 46) Dnipropetrovsk, Ukrainian SSR, Soviet Union
- Party: People's Front
- Other political affiliations: Batkivshchyna (until 2014)
- Spouse: Denys Dzenzerskyi
- Children: 1
- Education: Institute of International Relations of Taras Shevchenko National University of Kyiv

Tetiana Anatoliyivna Donets (Ukrainian: Тетяна Анатоліївна Донець; born 11 July 1980) is a Ukrainian politician who served as a People's Deputy of Ukraine in the seventh and eighth convocation.

== Early life and education ==
Donets was born on 11 July 1980 in Dnepropetrovsk, the daughter of Natalia Donets. In 1998, she worked as an assistant deputy and a member of the temporary investigative commission of the Verkhovna Rada on ensuring electoral rights. She studied at the National Taras Shevchenko University of Kyiv, where she graduated in law in 2003. From 2004 to 2005, she was the director of the Astoria Hotel in Dnepropetrovsk. In 2005, she completed her studies in foreign economics at the Kiev Institute for International Relations.

== Political career ==
From 2006 to 2010, Donets was a member of the political alliance BYuT in the district parliament of Shevchenkivskyi District, where she worked as chairman of the commission for local self-government and information policy. At that time, she was also the deputy leader of the BYuT faction in Shevchenkivskyi District.

In the 2012 parliamentary election, Donets was ranked 55 of the All-Ukrainian Union "Fatherland" party and was elected as a deputy to the Verkhovna Rada, where she was a member of the parliamentary committee on health policy. In the 2014 parliamentary election, Donets was number 20 on the People's Front list and was re-elected as a deputy in the eighth convocation.

== Personal life ==
On 26 January 2018, Donets gave birth to a daughter.
