= Donetsk (disambiguation) =

Donetsk is a city in eastern Ukraine.

Donetsk may also refer to:

- Donetsk Oblast, Ukraine, a primary subnational division of Ukraine
  - Donetsk Raion, a secondary subnational division within the oblast
- Donetsk People's Republic, a breakaway rebel region in eastern Ukraine and de jure/de facto a Russian region
- Donetsk–Krivoy Rog Soviet Republic, a former breakaway Soviet republic of the October Revolution
- Donetsk, Russia, a city in Rostov Oblast, Russia
- BC Donetsk, a basketball team based in the city of Donetsk, Ukraine
- FC Shakhtar Donetsk a Ukrainian professional football club
- Donetsk International Airport, an airport serving the city of Donetsk, Ukraine

== See also ==
- Donets (disambiguation)
- Donetz (disambiguation)
