= Dönitz (surname) =

Dönitz (also spelled Doenitz) is a German-language surname. Notable people with the name Dönitz include:

- Friedrich Karl Wilhelm Dönitz (1838–1912), German physician and zoologist
- Hans-Joachim Dönitz (1934–2010), East German naval officer
- Karl Dönitz (1891–1980), Supreme Commander of the Navy of the Third Reich and President of Germany
