= Oksana Pokalchuk =

Ukrainian lawyer and human rights activist

- Occupation: Human rights defender
- Employer: Amnesty International (2017–2022)

Oksana Pokalchuk is a Ukrainian lawyer and human rights activist who headed the Ukrainian section of Amnesty International from 2017 to 2022.

== Education ==
Pokalchuk graduated with a Master's Arts degree in law at Academy of Advocacy of Ukraine in 2009. She later started a PhD studying gender identity law at the Kyiv University of Law.

== Legal and human rights roles ==
In 2008, Pokalchuk started LGBT and other human rights work as a lawyer at the NGO Insight. Around 2015, she was an assistant lawyer at the European Court of Human Rights.

=== Amnesty International ===
Pokalchuk was the executive director of the Ukrainian section of Amnesty International starting in 2017. Following the 4 August 2022 publication by Amnesty International of a report on Ukrainian military usage of civilian areas, Pokalchuk stated that she would resign in protest. She stated, "I believe any work for the good of society should be done taking into account the local context and thinking through consequences. Most importantly, I am convinced that our surveys should be made thoroughly and with people in mind, whose lives often depend directly on the words and actions of international organizations." Pokalchuk did resign, as did several of her colleagues. Pokalchuk explained her reasons in The Washington Post on 13 August, stating her view that "the report's deepest flaw was how it contradicted its main objective: [f]ar from protecting civilians, it further endangered them by giving Russia a justification to continue its indiscriminate attacks." She described doubts about the report's validity in terms of international humanitarian law. In her judgment, Amnesty International Crisis Team researchers at the time had "exceptional training and experience in human rights, laws of war, weapons analysis" but "often lack[ed] [a] knowledge of local languages and context."

=== Freedom of speech ===
In 2017, Pokalchuk stated Amnesty International's view of Ukrainian decommunization laws as violating human rights, arguing that people should only have speech restricted for promoting violence, and not for "using symbols if the use of such symbols does not have the purpose of inciting violence or aggression".

=== War crimes and gender-based violence ===
In 2019, Pokalchuk stated that Russian authorities would not be able to prevent the International Criminal Court preliminary examination of possible war crimes that occurred in Ukraine starting with the Revolution of Dignity in late 2013 and early 2014 from proceeding through into a full investigation. She stated that Russian commanders at the highest military levels would be subject to prosecution if evidence of them giving orders to commit war crimes were found.

In 2020, Pokalchuk stated that Amnesty International had documented gender-based and domestic violence in eastern parts of Ukraine added to the stress of the war in Donbas. Eight cases of sexual violence against civilian girls and women by Ukrainian military forces were documented during 2017–2018. Pokalchuk said that women in the region "[didn't] feel safe – neither in public nor at home" and called for "swift and comprehensive legal reforms", based on consultations with survivors and women's groups, in order to protect the survivors of the violence. Shortly after the 2022 Russian invasion of Ukraine started, Pokalchuk predicted that the existing patriarchy in Ukraine would lead to worsening of sexual and domestic violence against women.

=== Freedom of association ===
Pokalchuk described the September 2021 arrest of Nariman Dzhelyal, deputy head of the Mejlis of the Crimean Tatar People, to be based on a fabricated case, stating that the prosecution was to prevent independent civil society from functioning in Crimea.

== See also ==
- Human rights in Ukraine
