= Oleksandr Hranovskyi (politician) =

Ukrainian politician

MP Oleksandr Hranovskyi
- Олександр Грановський
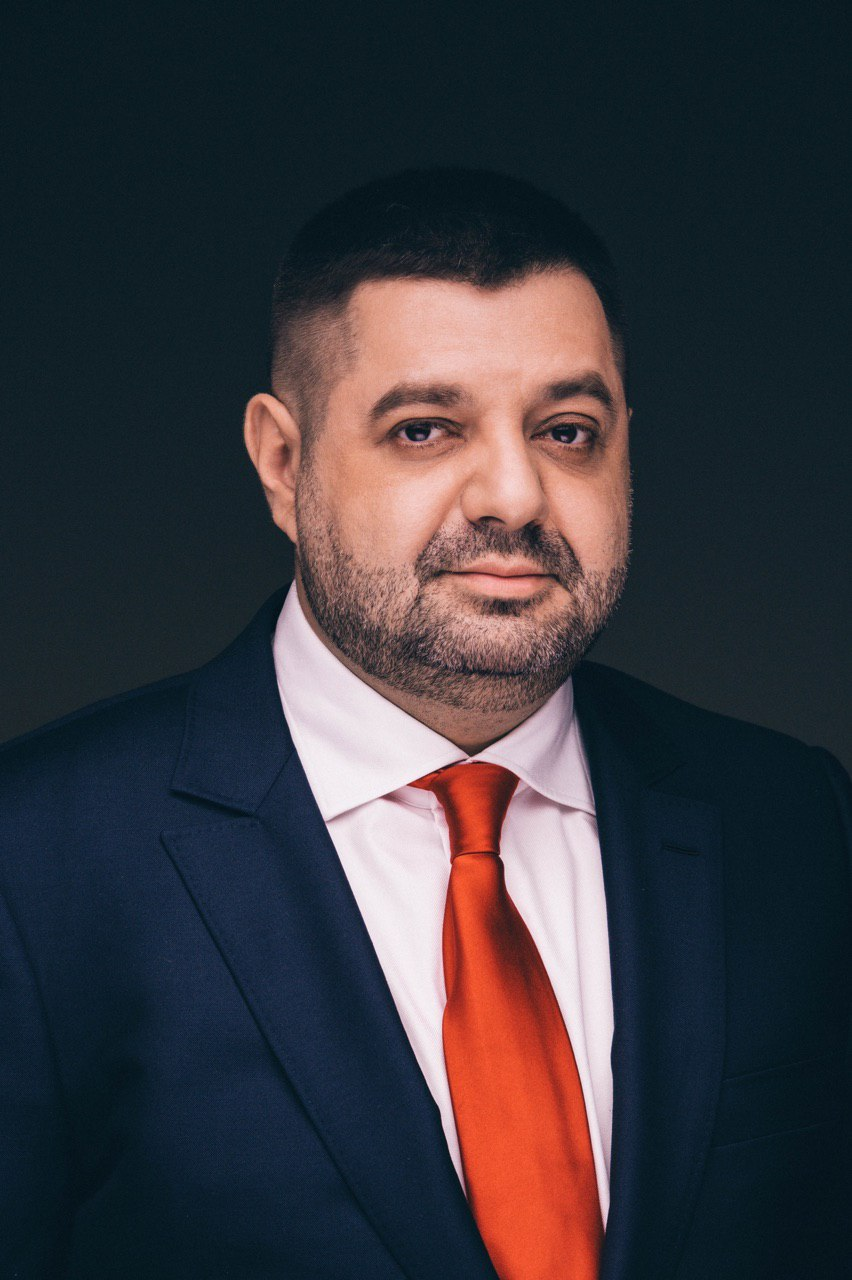
- Hranovskyi in 2020

People's Deputy of Ukraine

8th convocation
- In office 26 October 2014 – 29 August 2019
- Constituency: Petro Poroshenko Bloc "Solidarity"

Deputy of the Kyiv City Council
- In office 25 May 2014 – 30 November 2014

Personal details
- Born: 25 December 1979 (age 46) Kyiv, Ukrainian SSR, Soviet Union
- Education: International Solomon University; Ternopil National Economic University
- Website: hranovskyi.foundation

Oleksandr Mykhailovych Hranovskyi (Ukrainian: Олександр Михайлович Грановський; born 25 December 1979) is a Ukrainian politician who is currently serving as a People's Deputy of Ukraine of the 8th Ukrainian Verkhovna Rada, from the Petro Poroshenko Bloc "Solidarity".

By the end of 2017, he entered the rating of “100 most influential Ukrainians” according to the magazine “Focus”, in February 2018 – the rating of “TOP-20 most influential lawyers of Ukraine” according to the publication “Delovaya Stolitsa” (12th place in the ranking), in August 2018 – the rating of “100 the most influential people of Ukraine” according to the magazine “Novoe vremja strany” (68th place), and in 2019 – the rating of the most influential young politicians according to the Foundation "Ukrainian Politics".

On 20 August 2024, The High Anti-Corruption Court has canceled the suspicion against former MP Hranovskyi in the case of damage to the OPP.

In August 2025, NABU recognized Granovsky as a victim of illegal actions by its detectives.

== Education ==
In 2001, he graduated from the International Solomon University with a bachelor's degree in economics. In 2016 he graduated from Ternopil National Economic University with a Bachelor of Laws degree, and in 2018 at the same university he received a master's degree in law.

== Business career ==
From 2001 to 2007, he worked as finance director of retail and entertainment network centres “Caravan”.

From 2007 to 2009 – as a partner of the American-Ukrainian private architecture office “Laguarda Low Design and Development”.

From 2009 to 2014, Oleksandr Hranovskyi was a chairman of the board of directors of Assofit Holdings Limited.

From 2010 to 2014, he was the chairman of the supervisory board of the company Assofit Holdings Limited.

== Political career ==
From 25 May to 30 November 2014, he was a deputy of the Kyiv City Council from the party "UDAR" under No.23. He was a member of the budget issues and socio-economic development Commission and a member of the temporary utility inspection and other economic entities commission. The commission inspected those utilities and other economic entities, in the authorized capital of which there is a share of property of the territorial community of Kyiv.

During the elections on 26 October 2014, he passed to the Verkhovna Rada under No. 58, Petro Poroshenko Block. In Parliament he was elected the head of the Subcommittee on civil affairs, economic and administrative proceedings of the Committee on Legal Policy and Justice. Hranovskyi is a member of Committee on Legal Policy and Justice.

As a deputy introduced several bills to improve the activities of the prosecutor's office, bills for judicial improvements, property rights registration enhancements, improvements in registration of legal entities and individuals, bills which concern the Constitutional Court of Ukraine and the High Council of Justice of Ukraine.

On 1 November 2018, he was included in the list of Ukrainian individuals against whom the Government of Russia imposed economic sanctions.

On 29 May 2019, Hranovskyi left the party "Petro Poroshenko Bloc "Solidarity".

In the 2019 Ukrainian parliamentary election Hranovskyi tried to win a seat in Constituency No. 169 situated in Kharkiv as an independent candidate. But he lost the election to Oleksandr Kunytskyi of the party Servant of the People.

After President Zelenskyy came to power, a series of trials began against Hranovsky. His lawyers say this is political persecution.

For example, during one of the court sessions in August 2025, Lord Maurice Glazman, a member of the House of Lords and the Parliament of the United Kingdom, and Konstantinos Efstatiou, a member of the House of Representatives of the Republic of Cyprus, a member of the Cypriot delegation to the Parliamentary Assembly of the Council of Europe, a rapporteur on "Transnational Repression" in PACE, a member of the Committee on Legal Affairs and Human Rights, a lawyer and co-founder of the Cyprus Democratic Lawyers Association (CDLA), were present.

In the summer of 2026, after the closure of the OPP case against Granovsky, the Cyprus Democratic Lawyers Association issued a statement, in which it noted, in particular: “The case attracted the attention of the Cypriot and wider European legal community, as the Association had highlighted it as a notable example of the potential risks arising from the misuse of international criminal cooperation mechanisms in the context of transnational repression. This issue has been the subject of particular attention by the Council of Europe <...> The court found that the applicable statutory limitation period had expired and, pursuant to Article 49 of the Criminal Code of Ukraine, exempted Hranovskyi from criminal liability, thereby bringing the criminal proceedings to a final conclusion." "The Cyprus Democratic Lawyers Association reiterates that respect for the rule of law, judicial independence, and the guarantees of a fair trial constitutes a fundamental prerequisite for any process of international criminal cooperation. Cases that raise serious concerns regarding judicial independence and the fair administration of justice must be examined with the utmost care and in accordance with the standards established by the European Convention on Human Rights”.

== Social activity ==
Oleksandr Hranovskyi appealed to the President of Ukraine Petro Poroshenko and the commission on pardon with a petition for clemency of a life convicted Lyubov Kushinska. Kushinska was the first woman in Ukraine who was sentenced to life. She also became the first woman to be pardoned by the president.

People's Deputy Oleksandr Hranovskyi helps homeless animal shelter “Sirius”, he has five dogs at home and convinces his colleague in parliament Ihor Kononenko to take home an animal from a shelter.

Oleksandr Hranovskyi helped Kachanovsky correctional colony of Kharkiv, putting medical beds and installing a 3D cinema. Also, the deputy continues to work on the unraveling of the cases of some life-sentenced.

On 30 November 2018, Hranovskyi was elected president of the Kharkiv Regional Chess Federation. The politician replaced Sergey Gusarov in this post. At the beginning of 2019, he held a chess tournament between the Kyiv and Kharkiv regional federations, in which talented children, grandmasters and Olympic champions took part.

Founder of the Oleksandr Hranovskyi Charitable Foundation.

== Family ==
Oleksandr Hranovskyi has two daughters: Nonna and Asya.
