= Donetsk City (mall) =

Donetsk City Донецьк-Сіті
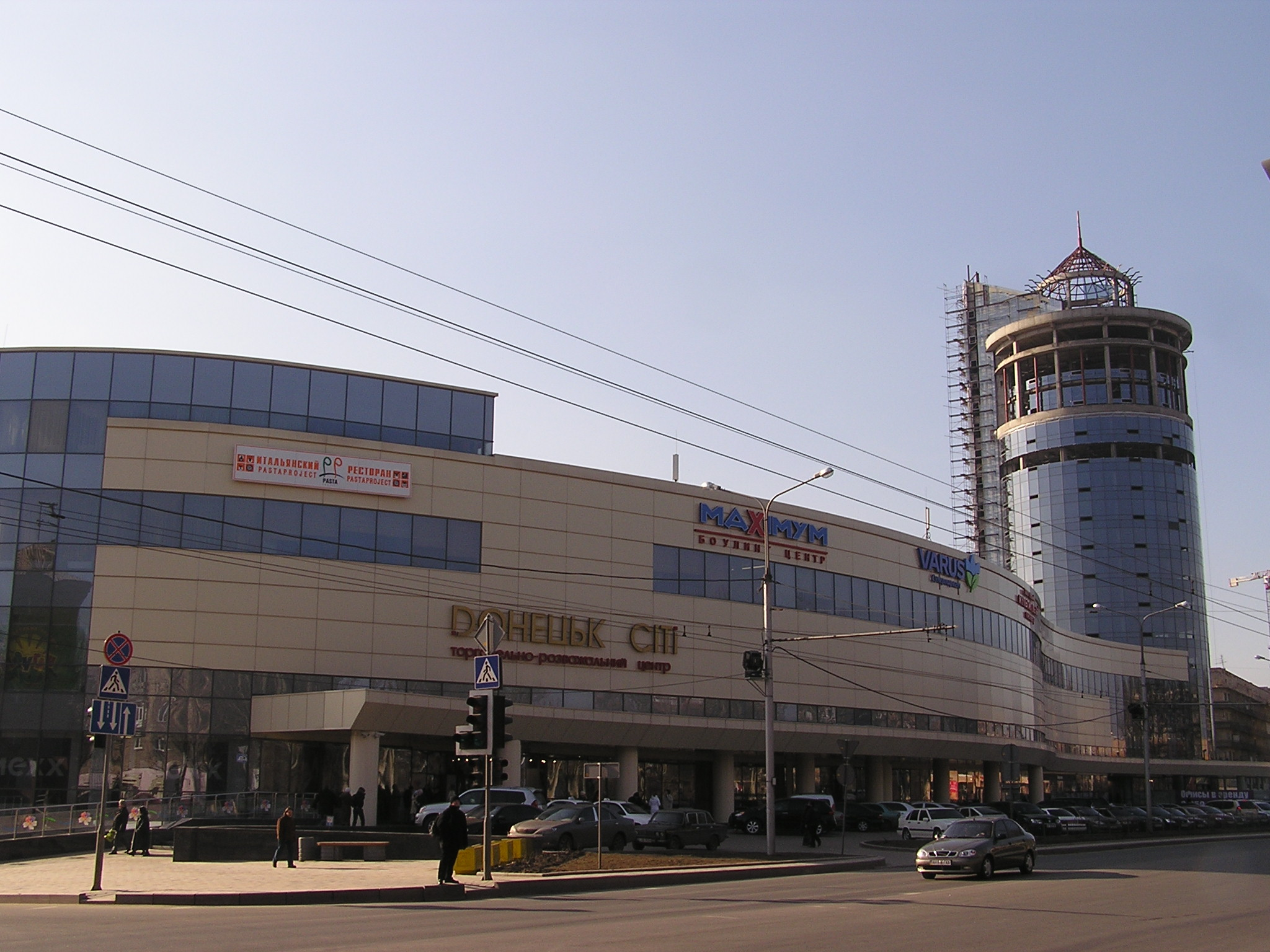
- Exterior of Donetsk City
- Location: Donetsk, Ukraine
- Coordinates: 48.0306°N 37.7875°E
- Opened: October 2006
- Floor area: 115,000 m^{2} (1,240,000 sq ft)
- Floors: 4
- Website: doncity.com.ua

Donetsk City (Ukrainian: Донецьк-Сіті, stylized as: DOHEцЬK CITi) is a large enclosed shopping mall in Donetsk, Ukraine. Located along Artema Street, the mall opened in October 2006 and includes a total area of approximately 115,000 sq. meters. It contains over 115 stores, an eight-screen multiplex, bowling alley, and a family entertainment center ("Funtura").

According to a November 2012 report in Forbes Ukraine, Donetsk City is the fifth most-visited shopping center in Ukraine, with an average of 30,000 visitors per day.

The mall is the flagship project of the "Investment and Development" group headed by Igor Gumenuk, Vasily Mikulin, and Irina Friedman. As of January 2013, a fair amount of the office space portion of the project was not yet rented.

Following the outbreak of the war in Donbas in 2014, Donetsk City briefly closed, before reopening a few years later. While most of the shops present at the mall did not return, a few remained functional.
