= Battle of the Donets =

Battle of the Donets may refer to:

- Battle of the Siverskyi Donets, 2022
- Battle of the Donets or the Third Battle of Kharkov, 1943
