= History of the Russian language in Ukraine =

The first known mention of Russian-speaking people in Ukraine refer to a small ethnic sub-group of Russians known as the Goriuns who resided in Putyvl region (what is modern northern Ukraine). These mentions date back to the times of Grand Duchy of Lithuania or perhaps even earlier.

== Russian migration ==
The first waves of Russian settlers onto what became Ukrainian territory came in the late 16th century to the area known as Slobozhanschyna or Sloboda Ukraina, in what is now northeastern Ukraine. This territory was settled after being abandoned by the Tatars. Russian settlers however were outnumbered by Ukrainian settlers who were escaping harsh exploitative conditions in the west.

More Russian speakers appeared in the northern, central and eastern territories that are now Ukraine during the late 17th century, following the Cossack Rebellion (1648–1657) which Bohdan Khmelnytsky led against Poland. The Khmelnytsky Uprising led to a massive movement of Ukrainian settlers to the Slobozhanschyna region, which converted it from a sparsely inhabited frontier area to one of the major populated regions of the Tsardom of Russia. Following the Pereyaslav Rada of 1654 the parts which were under the Cossack Hetmanate (a predecessor of modern Ukraine entered the Russian Tsardom. This brought significant, but still small, wave of Russian settlers into what is now central Ukraine (primarily several thousand soldiers stationed in garrisons, out of a population of approximately 1.2 million non-Russians).

The 19th century saw a dramatic increase in the urban Russian population in Novorossiya and other parts which are now Ukraine, as ethnic Russian settlers moved into and populated the newly industrialised and growing towns. At the beginning of the 20th century, Russians were the largest ethnic group in almost all large cities within Ukraine's modern borders, including the following: Kiev (54.2%), Kharkiv (63.1%), Odessa (49.09%), Mykolaiv (66.33%), Mariupol (63.22%), Luhansk, (68.16%), Kherson (47.21%), Melitopol (42.8%), Yekaterinoslav (current Dnipro), (41.78%), Yelisavetgrad (current Kropyvnytskyi) (34.64%), Simferopol (45.64%), Yalta (66.17%), Kerch (57.8%), Sevastopol (63.46%). The Ukrainian migrants who settled in these cities entered a Russian-speaking milieu (particularly with Russian-speaking administration) and needed to adopt the Russian language.

== Adoption of Russian language ==
With the gradual urbanization of Society in the late 19th century, Ukrainian migrants from rural areas who settled in the cities entered a Russian-speaking milieu. With all State educational instruction and cultural establishments using Russian many Ukrainians were forced to use the Russian language.

The Russian government promoted the spread of the Russian language among the native Ukrainian population by actively suppressing the Ukrainian language. Alarmed by the threat of Ukrainian separatism implied by a growing number of school textbooks teaching the Ukrainian language, the Russian Minister of Internal Affairs Pyotr Valuev in 1863 issued a circular that banned the publication of religious texts and educational texts written in the Ukrainian language. This ban was expanded by Tsar Alexander II who issued the Ems Ukaz in 1876. All Ukrainian language books and song lyrics were banned, as was the importation of such works. Furthermore, Ukrainian-language public performances, plays, and lectures were forbidden. In 1881, the decree was amended to allow the publishing of lyrics and dictionaries, and the performances of some plays in the Ukrainian language with local officials' approval. Ukrainian-only troupes were forbidden.

While officially, there was no state language in the Soviet Union, Russian was in practice in a privileged position. The Ukrainian language was often frowned upon or quietly discouraged, which led to the gradual decline in its usage.

In independent Ukraine, although Russian is not an official language of the country, it continues to hold a privileged position and is widely spoken, in particular in regions of Ukraine where Soviet Russification policies were the strongest, notably most of the urban areas of the east and south.

In 1994 a referendum took place in the Donetsk Oblast and the Luhansk Oblast, with around 40% supporting the Russian language gaining status of an official language alongside Ukrainian, and for the Russian language to be an official language on a regional level; however, the referendum was annulled by the Kyiv government.
