= Road Control =

Organization in Ukraine

- Founded: 2008
- Purpose: road police of Ukraine
- Location: Kyiv, Ukraine
- Region served: Ukraine
- Method: video documentation
- Owner: Rostislav Shaposhnikov
- Website: http://roadcontrol.org.ua

Road Control (Ukrainian: Дорожній Контроль, ДК, romanized: Dorozhniy Kontrol, DK, Russian: Дорожный Контроль, ДК, romanized: Dorozhnyy Kontrol', DK) is a non-governmental organization in Ukraine advocating for road safety, transparency of road police, and human rights. Road Control was founded in Kyiv (Ukraine) in 2008 as a reflection of the increasing level of irresponsibility among many road police officers in Ukraine. The main goal of Road Control is to eliminate the corruption, criminal and other types of Ukrainian road police (Ukrainian: ДАІ [DAI], Russian: ГАИ [GAI]) misconduct activities against car-drivers and pedestrians in Ukraine.

== Activity ==
To achieve their aims, Road Control activists make video documentation of DAI’s offence activity, uploaded the video to the YouTube making it available to the public. Moreover, such video is subsequently used as a significant evidence to initiate administrative or criminal trials. On the other hand, such video along with comments from the Road Control activists is used as an educational source for drivers against the DAI lawlessness.

A newspaper (sharing the same name as the organization) was founded and is published by Road Control.

== Criminals vs. Road Control members ==
Due to their activity, vehicles of Road Control activists were targets for arson. In March 2012 a chairperson of Road Control, Rostislav Shaposhnikov was kidnapped and heavily beaten in the forest near Kyiv City by unknown people, who were acting by DAI orders as he suspected. All these cases were reported to police, but the criminals were never identified. To support Rostislav and to protest against police inactivity, a demonstration took place at the Ministry of Internal affairs of Ukraine.

== Involvement in Euromaidan ==
In late 2013, activists from Road Control became active participants of Euromaidan, and relations with law enforcement agencies, which served the Yanukovych government, became extremely tense, with reports of threats being sent to Road Control.

On 11 December 2013, the head of "Road Control" Rostyslav Shaposhnikov, due to the threat of arrest and danger to his life, left for Poland. They arrested Andrii Dzindzu and Viktor Smaliy, they said I would be the third. In an interview with Ukrainian media, Shaposhnikov stated: “They didn't have time to arrest me because I left.” Shaposhnikov also stated that he did not intend to return to Ukraine while the Yanukovych government remained in power, due to the threats on his life made.

On 21 December 2013, unknown attackers, believed to be from the Yanukovych government, shot Volodymyr Maralov, a "Road Control" activist, and burned his car. They had PM combat pistols and were professionally trained.
