= SS Saar =

1937 built German cargo ship

History
- Name: Saar (1937-1945); Empire Congleton (1945-46); Donetz (1946- )
- Owner: R C Gribel (1937-45); Ministry of War Transport (1945); Ministry of Transport (1945-46); Soviet Government (1946- )
- Operator: R C Gribel (1937-45); T H Donking & Sons Ltd (1945-46); Soviet Government (1946- )
- Port of registry: (Nazi Germany) Stettin (1937-45); (United Kingdom) London (1945-46); Soviet Union (1946- )
- Builder: Stettiner Oderwerke AG
- Launched: 1937
- Identification: Code Letters DAYW (1937-45); Code Letters GNML (1945-46); United Kingdom Official Number 180703 (1945-46)
- Status: In active service as of 1946

General characteristics
- Type: Cargo ship
- Tonnage: 1,026 GRT; 560 NRT
- Length: 208 ft 9 in (63.63 m)
- Beam: 32 ft 5 in (9.88 m)
- Depth: 17 ft 2 in (5.23 m)
- Installed power: Compound steam engine
- Propulsion: Screw propeller

Saar was a 1,026 GRT cargo ship that was built in 1937 by Stettiner Oderwerke AG, Stettin for German owners. She was seized by the Allies at Kolding, Denmark in May 1945, passed to the Ministry of War Transport (MoWT) and renamed Empire Congleton. In 1946, she was passed to the Soviet Union and renamed Donetz (Донец).

== Description ==
The ship was built in 1937 by Stettiner Oderwerke AG, Stettin.

The ship was 208 feet 9 inches (63.63 m) long, with a beam of 32 feet 5 inches (9.88 m) a depth of 17 feet 2 inches (5.23 m). She had a GRT of 1,026 and a NRT of 560.

The ship was propelled by a compound steam engine which had two cylinders of 13 2/8 inches (34 cm) and two cylinders of 28 3/4 inches (73 cm) diameter by 28 3/4 inches (73 cm) stroke. The engine was built by Ottensener Maschinenbau GmbH, Altona.

== History ==
Saar was built for R C Gribel. Her port of registry was Stettin and she used the Code Letters DAYW. In February 1945, Saar was one of the ship involved in the transportation of refugees from Pillau, East Prussia to Swinemünde, Germany. In May 1945, Saar was seized by the Allies at Kolding, Denmark. She was passed to the MoWT and renamed Empire Congleton. Her port of registry was changed to London. She was allocated the Code Letters GNML and the United Kingdom Official Number 180703. In 1946 she was passed to the Soviet Union and renamed Donetz.
