= Maria Mezentseva =

Ukrainian politician (born 1989)

- Марія Мезенцева
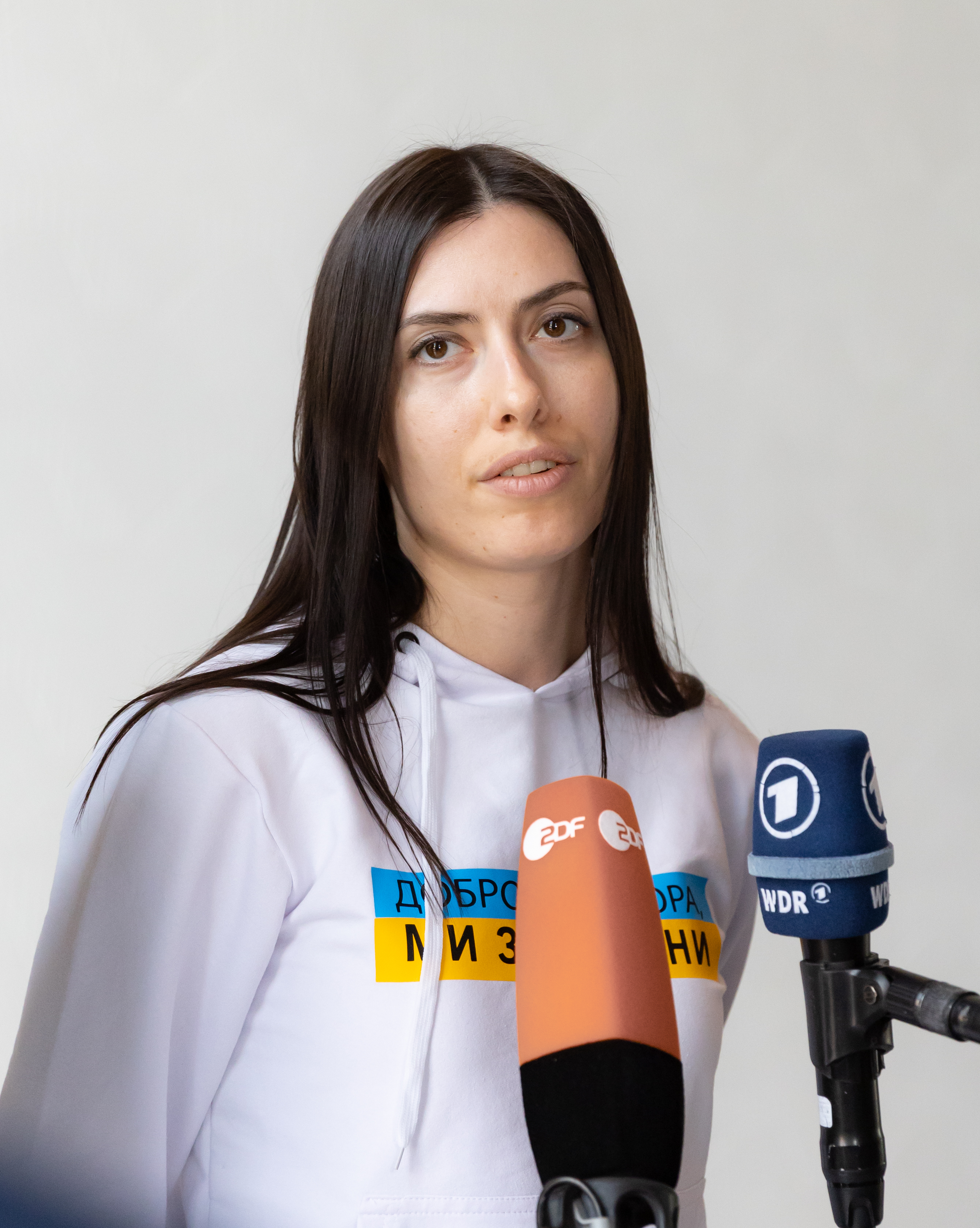
- Mezentseva in 2022

People's Deputy of Ukraine
- Incumbent
- Assumed office 29 August 2019

Personal details
- Born: 10 December 1989 (age 36) Kharkiv, Ukrainian Soviet Socialist Republic, Soviet Union
- Party: Servant of the People (from 2019)
- Other political affiliations: Self Reliance (2015)

Maria Serhiyivna Mezentseva (Ukrainian: Марія Сергіївна Мезенцева; born 10 December 1989) is a Ukrainian politician. Mezentseva was elected to Verkhovna Rada, the Ukrainian parliament, in 2019. She holds several positions related to European integration, including deputy chairperson of the Committee on Ukraine's Integration into the European Union (as of 2020) and chairperson of the Ukrainian delegation to the Parliamentary Assembly of the Council of Europe (as of 2021).

== Youth and early career ==
Maria Mezentseva was born on 10 December 1989 in Kharkiv. She did an internship in Brussels with European political parties and the European Parliament and returned to Ukraine during the late 2013, early 2014 Revolution of Dignity.

== Political career ==
=== Ukraine ===
Mezentseva was elected to the Kharkiv City Council in 2015 for the party Self Reliance. In the 2019 Ukrainian parliamentary election, she was elected to the Verkhovna Rada, the Ukrainian parliament, representing Kharkiv, and as a member of the Servant of the People party.

Mezentseva saw one of her political achievements as writing a law for the Verkhovna Rada that increased the integration of the Ukrainian market with the European market.

=== Europe ===
As of 2020, Mezentseva was one of the deputy chairpersons of the Committee on Ukraine's Integration into the European Union. As of 2021, she was the chairperson of the Ukrainian delegation to the Parliamentary Assembly of the Council of Europe (PACE).

In November 2021, Mezentseva saw priorities for Ukraine in the Council of Europe (COE) to include "democracy and human rights, vaccination and the environment, sustainable development and displaced persons". She argued that gender equality was a priority for Ukraine, and that Ukrainians were campaigning for the Verkhovna Rada to ratify the Istanbul Convention that opposes violence against women and domestic violence.

Mezentseva stated in November 2021 that Russian members of the COE responded to Ukrainian members with consistent aggression, with one Russian member, Petr Tolstoi, stating that all Ukrainians disagreeing with the Russian position "should be hung on lanterns". Mezentseva stated that the Ukrainian delegation filed a complaint under the PACE Code of Conduct.

=== Russian invasion ===
During the 2022 Russian invasion of Ukraine, Mezentseva gave an interview with Sky News about one victim of sexual violence and stated that there were "many more victims".

== Points of view ==
In 2021, Mezentseva saw Ukraine as a young democracy, fighting for independence since 1917. She described herself as "a young person who does not represent particular international companies or organizations, having limited financial resources to campaign", and saw that as a sign that Ukraine democracy was developing positively. She was concerned about the influence of oligarchs in Ukraine.

Mezentseva joined the Christian Democrats group of the COE.

== Personal life ==
In November 2021, Mezentseva stated that she was ill with COVID-19, infected by the Delta variant.
