= Kharkiv State University of Food Technology and Trade =

University in Kharkiv, Ukraine

Coordinates: 50.041806°N 36.194583°E

- Харківський державний університет харчування та торгівлі Kharkivskyi derzhavnyi universytet kharchuvannia i torgivli
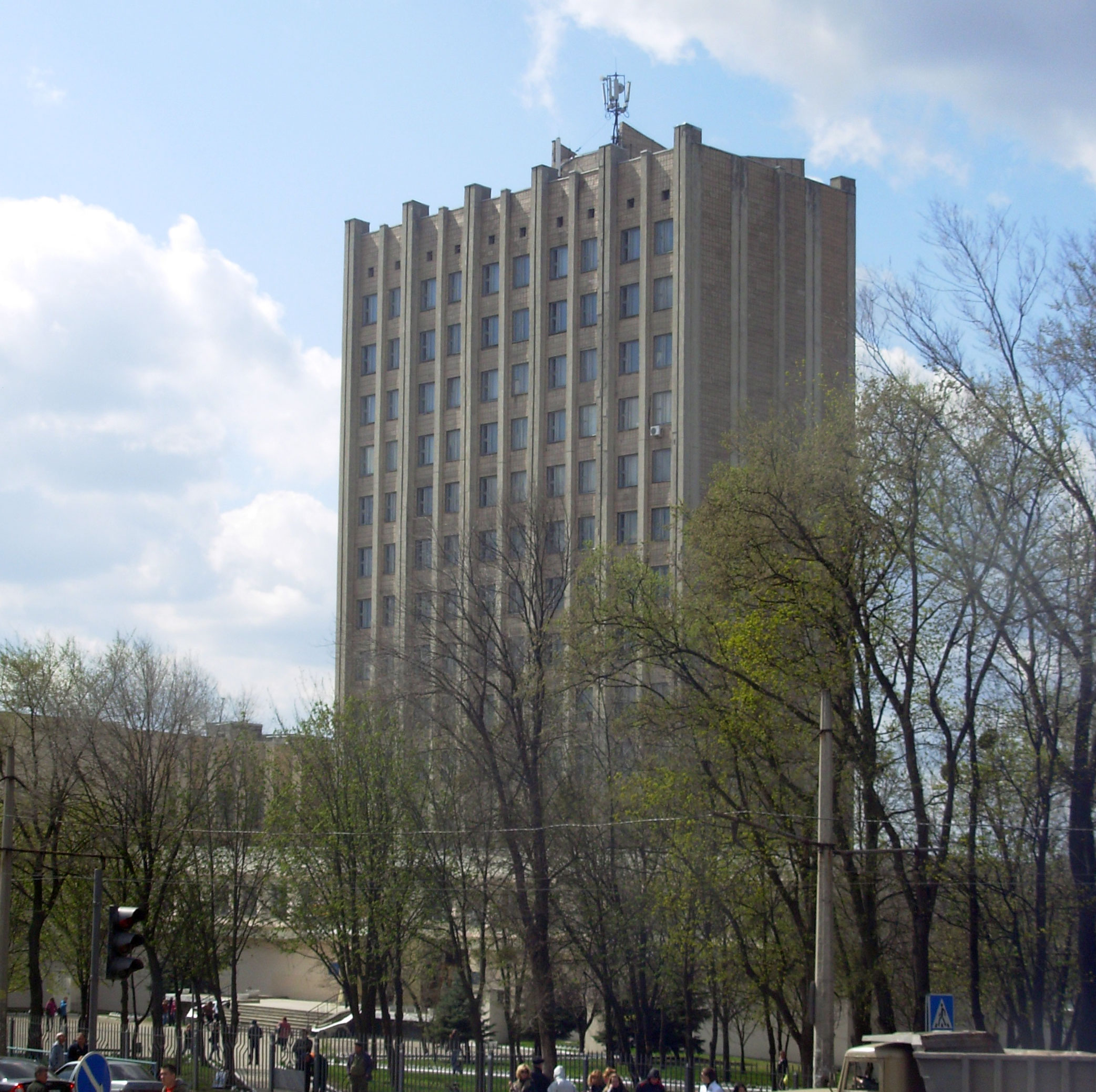
- University building
- Motto in English: The quality of the third millennium
- Established: 1967
- Affiliations: State University of Biotechnology (since 2021); Ministry of Education and Science of Ukraine
- Rector: Olexandr Cherevko
- Students: 5518
- Location: Kharkiv; Sevastopol; Dnipro; Pervomaisk, Ukraine
- Campus: 333 Klochkivska, 61051 Kharkiv
- Website: www.khsuft.com

The Kharkiv State University of Food Technology and Trade is a Ukrainian public university in Kharkiv. In 2021 became part of the State University of Biotechnology (since 2021) as its main campus.

== Campuses and buildings ==
The University is located in 5 academic buildings that make up the unique ensemble of buildings; the total area is 41 323 m2.

== Institutes and faculties ==
- Educational and Research Institute of Food Technologies and Business
- The Faculty of Equipment and Technical Service
- Merchandising Faculty
- Faculty of Management
- Economic Faculty
- Accounting and Finance Faculty

== See also ==
List of universities in Ukraine
