= Iryna Farion =

Ukrainian linguist and politician (1964–2024)

- Ірина Фаріон
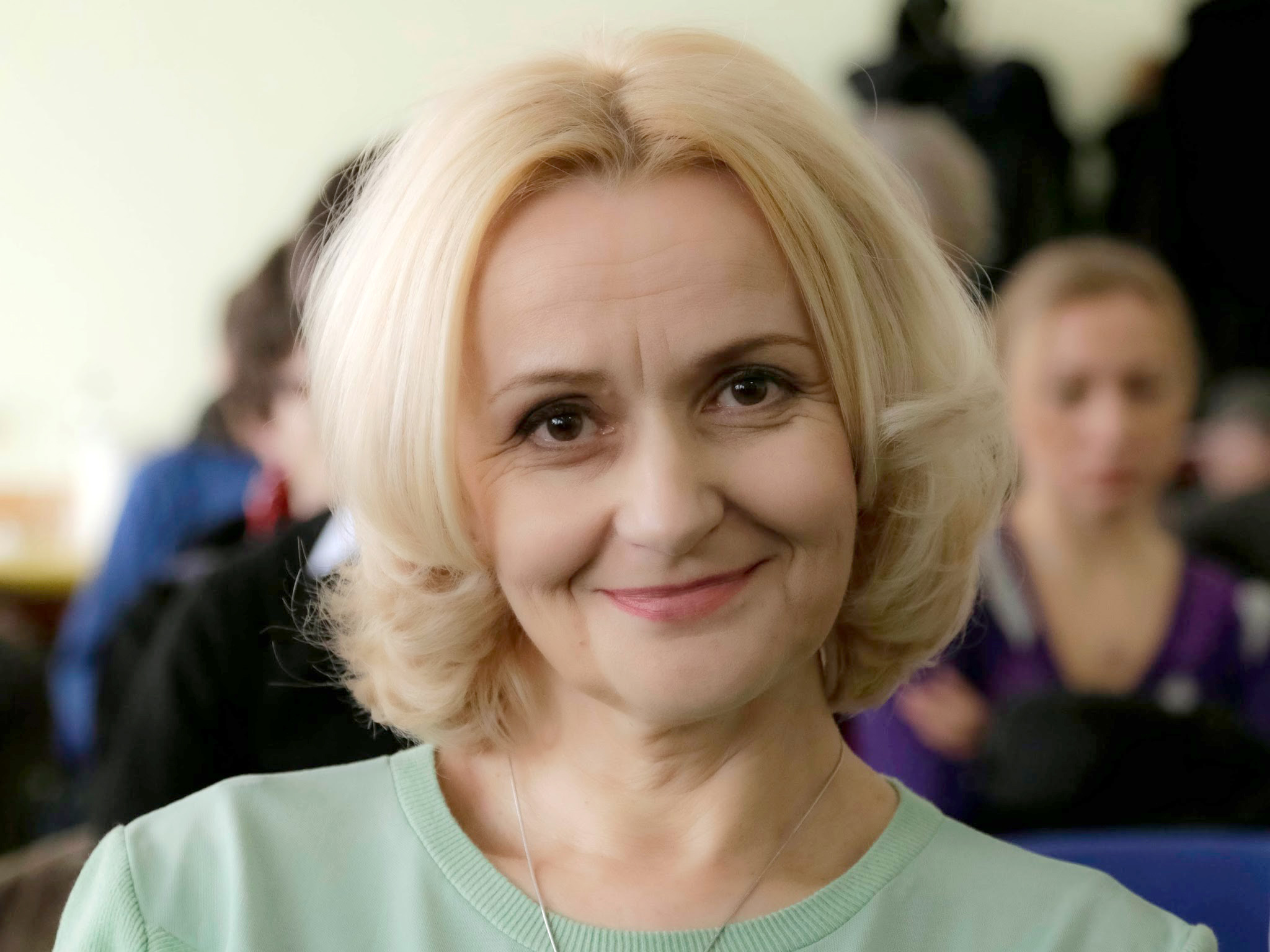
- Farion in 2015

People's Deputy of Ukraine
- In office 12 December 2012 – 27 November 2014
- Preceded by: Constituency established
- Succeeded by: Iryna Podoliak
- Constituency: Lviv Oblast, No. 116

Member of the Lviv Oblast Council
- In office 2005–2012

Personal details
- Born: 29 April 1964 Lviv, Ukrainian SSR, Soviet Union
- Died: 19 July 2024 (aged 60) Lviv, Ukraine
- Cause of death: Assassination by gunshot
- Party: Svoboda (2005-2024)
- Other political affiliations: CPSU (1988-1989)
- Children: 1
- Education: Lviv University
- Occupation: Professor, politician, philologist
- Awards: Oleksa Hirnyk Prize; Borys Hrinchenko Prize
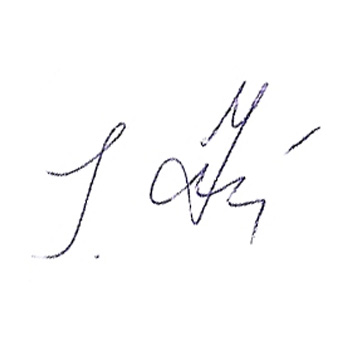
- Signature
- Website: Official website

Iryna Dmytrivna Farion (Ukrainian: Ірина Дмитрівна Фаріон, pronounced [iˈrɪnɐ ˈdmɪtr⁽ʲ⁾iu̯nɐ fɐr⁽ʲ⁾iˈɔn]; 29 April 1964 – 19 July 2024) was a Ukrainian linguist and nationalist politician who served as a deputy in the Verkhovna Rada from 2012 to 2014. She served as a political member of Svoboda in 2005 until her assassination in 2024. She was a professor at the Department of Ukrainian Language at Lviv Polytechnic's Institute of Humanitarian and Social Sciences.

Farion was known for her campaigns to promote the Ukrainian heritage language learning as a part of decolonisation, and for her vocal criticism of Ukrainians who speak Russian.

== Early life and education ==
Iryna Dmytrivna Farion was born on 29 April 1964 in Lviv, Ukraine, to Dmytro Farion, a plumber, and Yaroslava Farion (née Slipets), a librarian.

Farion graduated from the philology department of Lviv University in 1987. Until 1991, she was head of the center of Ukrainian studies at Lviv University. In 1996, she defended her doctoral thesis in philology at Lviv University. (Note: Candidate of Sciences.)

== Academic career ==
Farion has been noted by Ukrainian academics for her efforts to promote the use of the Ukrainian language. Among her scientific works are at least four monographs and 200 articles. From 1990 to 1995 Farion worked as an hourly teacher at the Department of Languages of the Lviv State Institute of Applied Arts (now the Lviv National Academy of Arts), where she taught Ukrainian as a foreign language, language culture, and Ukrainian literature from the 11th to the 20th centuries. Then, in 1998 – 2004, Farion headed the language commission of Prosvita. From 1998, she initiated and organized the annual student competition "Language is a foundation of your life" (Ukrainian: Мова – твого життя основа, romanized: Mova – tvoho zhyttia osnova). In 2004, she received the Oleksa Hirnyk Literature Award. From 1990 to 1995 she taught Ukrainian literature and Ukrainian at the Lviv National Academy of Arts. She defended her higher doctoral dissertation in 2015. (Note: Doctor of Sciences.) Farion was awarded numerous awards for her academic and educational activities, including the All-Ukrainian Borys Grinchenko Prize.

Farion wrote about the present state and oppression of the Ukrainian language, her most significant work being Language Norm: Destruction, Search, Restoration (Culture of Speech of Public Figures), a monograph that had three editions, dedicated to the evolution of language norms and the reasons for the distortion of the Ukrainian language norm in the 20th century.

Farion also wrote extensively about the history of the Ukrainian language, one of her main works being The Social Status of the Old Ukrainian (Russian) Language in the 14th-17th Centuries: Linguistic Consciousness, Linguistic Reality, Linguistic Perspective, where she rehabilitated the term Old Ukrainian language and argued that the mission of the language is to create a nation and a state.

She dedicated monographs and essays to important figures in the history of the Ukrainian language, among which are Father Markian Shashkevich - Ukrainian Language Creator (2007) and Linguistic Portrait of Ivan Pulyui (According to the Letters of the Thinker) (2017).

She was involved in several educational projects about the Ukrainian language and culture during her lifetime. One of them, the project "From the book to the goal" that she started in 2011 was aimed at youth with the aim of popularizing Ukrainian books.

== Political career ==
=== Communist party ===
During Farion's college years, she was a member of the Communist Party of the Soviet Union, the only student of Lviv University being in the Communist Party. Farion at first denied membership within the Communist Party, but later said that she could not have such a career without joining the party; Farion also stated that she joined the party to "destroy it from within". Having joined the party, she published the newspaper dedicated to Ukrainian USSR political prisoner Vasyl Stus, and was accused of nationalism by a party group.

=== As a local councillor ===
In 2005, Farion was elected to the Lviv Oblast Council. During her term, Farion was a deputy chairperson of the commission on education and science. She was re-elected in 2010. In the 2015 local elections, Farion again contested a single-member district but was defeated.

=== As a People's Deputy ===
Farion joined the Ukrainian nationalist Svoboda party in 2005 and balloted for People's Deputy of Ukraine mandate from the party list in 2006. However, Svoboda received less than 0.4% of the vote and failed to pass the electoral threshold. In the 2007 parliamentary election, Farion again ran on the Svoboda party list, but the party failed to pass the threshold, receiving less than 0.8% of the vote.

In the 2012 parliamentary election, Farion was elected into parliament after winning the 116th electoral district in Lviv in a landslide, receiving 68% of the vote. From 2013, she served as the head of the parliamentary subcommittee on higher education in science and education. In 2014, Farion became the first deputy chairperson of the committee on science and education. According to the Ukrainian monitoring platform Slovo i Dilo, Farion fulfilled only 4% of her declared promises during her term.

In the 2014 parliamentary election, Farion again tried to retain her seat, but was defeated by Self Reliance candidate, Iryna Podoliak, falling into third place with 16.4% of the vote. After losing her seat, the former MP made controversial remarks regarding the voters who supported her opponents. In the July 2019 Ukrainian parliamentary election, Farion again failed to return to parliament after finishing fifth with 10.4% of the vote in the district no.116.

=== Criminal proceedings in Russia ===
In July 2015, the Investigative Committee of Russia filed a criminal case against Farion on the charges of "incitement to murder" and "extremist statements" that she allegedly made on a public rally on 15 October 2014.

=== Lviv Polytechnic scandal ===
In November 2023, Farion stated in an interview that "there is no Russian-speaking population, there are Ukrainians, and there are Katsaps"; she also said that she would not consider Russian-speaking military members to be Ukrainian. Film actor and military sniper Pavlo Aldoshyn strongly criticized her comments, saying that no one outside the military should instruct soldiers on how to communicate between them.

After facing criticism, Farion published a letter by a supporter in the occupied Crimean Peninsula, but did not blur his name, causing him to be detained by Russian authorities. This resulted in public outrage, including criticism from politician Tamila Tasheva, and student protests at Lviv Polytechnic, but the institute stated it is not responsible for statements outside the university. Farion later appealed to the president and defence minister to "take measures" against Azov fighters who criticized her. The incident led to Ukraine's human rights ombudsman to say that he had asked the Security Service of Ukraine (SBU) to open an investigation. On 15 November, the SBU opened an investigation against her on the counts of discrimination, insulting the dignity of a serviceman, violation of confidentiality of correspondence, and breach of inviolability of private life, and she was relieved of her position at Lviv Polytechnic. She was reinstated at Lviv Polytechnic in May 2024.

== Death ==
On 19 July 2024, at around 19:30 (EEST), Farion was shot in Lviv. The attacker was described to be a young man of about 20–25 years of age; according to Farion's neighbours, they had noticed him in the morning, waiting near her home. She was immediately admitted to the hospital in the emergency department with a gunshot wound to the head in an "extremely serious" condition. At around 23:00 EEST on the same day, doctors at the hospital announced that she was comatose and on life support. She died around 23:20, at the age of 60.

Ukraine's interior minister Ihor Klymenko stated that the murder was premeditated and the main motives the investigators were considering were either her political and social activity or a personal dislike.

=== Suspect ===
On 25 July 2024, Ukrainian president Volodymyr Zelenskyy announced the arrest of the suspected gunman in Dnipro, Vyacheslav Zinchenko, an 18-year-old male. The suspect was following several far-right and neo-Nazi Telegram channels including Yevhen Karas' S14 and Right Sector, and was trying to enlist in the 3rd Assault Brigade. Zinchenko denied any responsibility in the murder of Farion. The suspect's father, who was fighting on the Ukrainian front line, said his son did not have anti-Ukrainian views and was a patriot who was preparing to join the army. The father also stated that his son is a supporter of a mono-ethnic Ukrainian state, and that in 2022 he became a member of the "Right Youth" movement, the youth organization of Right Sector. According to the suspect's mother, her son is an admirer of Stepan Bandera, speaks good Ukrainian, and therefore the accusations against him are just a "political game".

Earlier that day, the Russian National Socialism / White Power group, considered a terrorist group in Russia, allegedly claimed responsibility for the murder. The video of the murder claim contains the recording of the alleged moment of the shooting and is embedded at the end of a long video entitled "Manifesto of a Ukrainian Autonomous Revolutionary Racist".

=== Investigation ===
In July 2024, the Ministry of Internal Affairs of Ukraine reported that the investigation in the case of the murder found a shell of a sports bullet at the scene. It also reported that the police headed out to the scene of the crime right after being informed about the shooting. Klymenko was present at the crime scene at night himself.

=== Funeral ===
Farion's memorial service was held in Lviv on 21 July. Reports on the number of mourners varied from several hundred to over five thousand. She was buried in the Lychakiv Cemetery, near singer-songwriter Volodymyr Ivasyuk.

=== Reactions ===
Zelenskyy expressed his condolences to her family. The head of the Lviv regional administration and the mayor of Lviv, Maksym Kozytskyi and Andriy Sadovyi, also expressed their condolences to her family. Mayor of Kyiv Vitali Klitschko called her murder "a provocation and a challenge to the law enforcement system, democracy and stability in the country", while former president Viktor Yushchenko called Farion's murder "a calculated special operation of the enemy."

Farion's political party, Svoboda, accused the Russian government of organizing her death. Journalist Ostap Drozdov called her murder "a bullet for every [Ukrainian] patriot". Politician Yaroslav Yurchyshyn called for the banning of Russian-affiliated religious organizations, stating it would be the "best immediate tribute to Iryna Farion's memory."

Multiple public figures, including rapper Oleksandr Yarmak, singers Maria Burmaka, Iryna Fedyshyn and Khrystyna Soloviy, TV presenter Olha Freimut, actor Rymma Zyubina and writer Oksana Zabuzhko wrote tributes to Farion. Farion's daughter called for a monument to be placed on Masaryk Street where she was shot, and to rename the street to "Iryna Farion Street".

== Political views ==
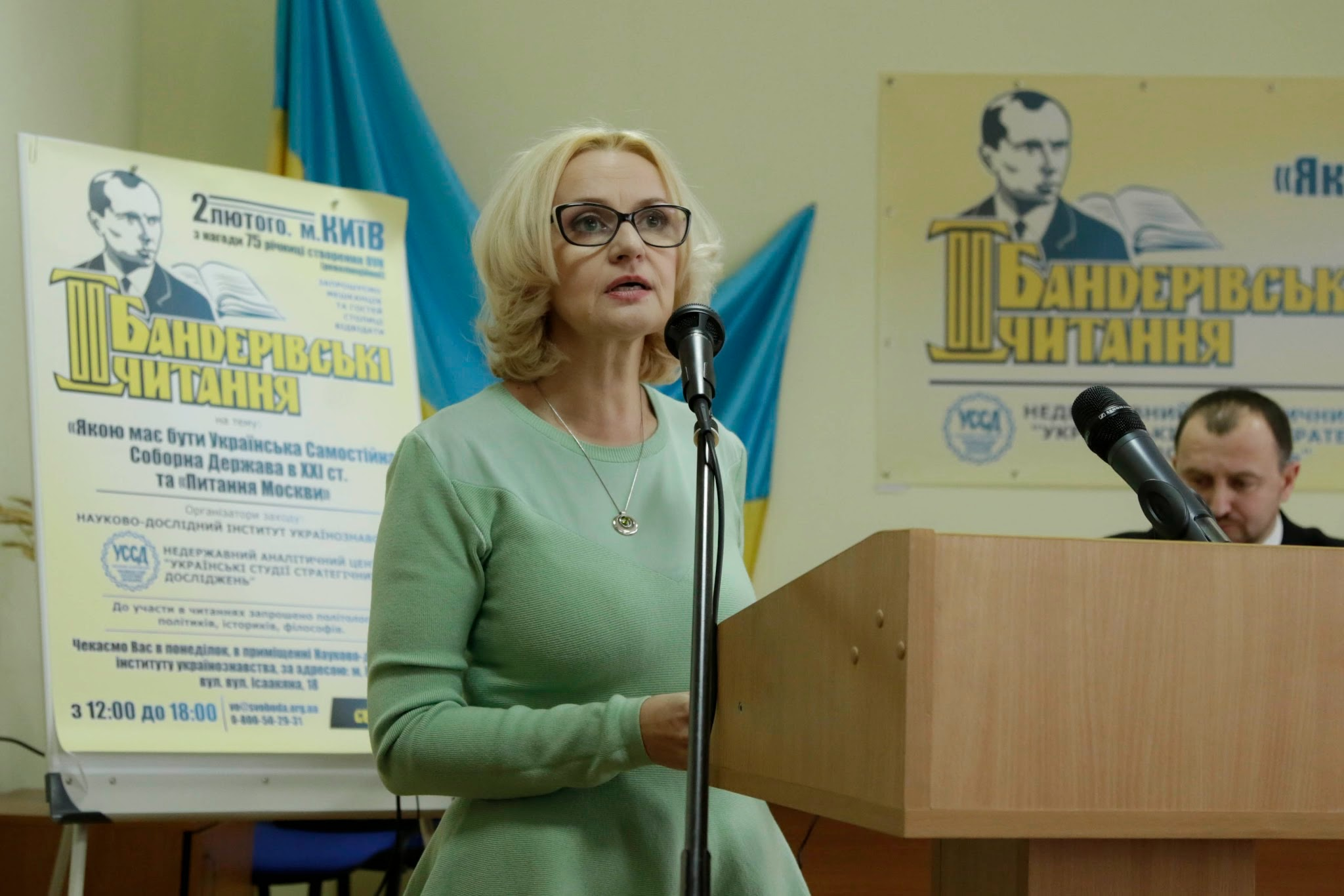
Farion in 2015 at Bandera Readings

According to the Kharkiv Human Rights Protection Group, "Iryna Farion's extreme nationalist views have long made the Lviv linguist and Svoboda [Freedom] Party politician a controversial figure." Farion has been characterized as far-right.

During the Euromaidan protests of 2013–2014, Farion supported the opposition movement against Viktor Yanukovych’s government. She described European integration as a way for Ukraine to move away from Russian political and cultural influence, linking national identity and language policy with the country’s independence

From 2014 to 2019, Farion hosted the historical programme "The Greatness of the Individual", with the aim of popularising Stepan Bandera in Ukraine.

Farion welcomed the murder of journalist Oles Buzina in April 2015, calling him a "degenerate" and "scumbag".

In 2017 she accused Ukrainian TV presenter Dmitry Gordon on air of being an FSB agent. In March 2019, in response to journalist Dmitry Gordon's criticism of Stepan Bandera, Farion called Gordon an enemy and wished him a "torturous death". For this, she was harshly criticized by the National Union of Journalists of Ukraine.

In October 2018, Farion called ethnic Hungarians in the Zakarpattia region "idiots" and suggested that they "go back to Hungary", while comparing them to "dogs who cannot learn the language of Stepan Bandera, Taras Shevchenko, and Lina Kostenko".

=== Opposition to Russian language in Ukraine ===
In February 2010, on International Mother Language Day, Farion was filmed instructing kindergartners to avoid using Russian names. In one instance, she tells them to "go where the Mashas live" if they wanted to be called Masha; a video of the incident was aired on Russian state television and was widely criticized. The incident was also widely discussed and criticized in the Ukrainian media. One deputy from the Party of Regions asked the Prosecutor General of Ukraine to file a criminal case against her on the grounds of language-based and nationality-based discrimination.

In June 2010, Farion stated: "We have 14% of Ukrainians who indicated that their native language is Russian, that is, the language of the occupier. This indicates a terrible mutation of their consciousness. These are 5 million Ukrainian degenerates. And they need to be saved". Farion also suggested that Ukrainians who do not know the Ukrainian language should be imprisoned. That year she also called for a campaign to "punch every Russian-speaking person in the jaw".

During her term in the Verkhovna Rada, Farion was a vocal opponent of the 2012 Law on the Principles of State Language Policy, which expanded the use of regional languages in Ukraine. She also called for measures to prevent the use of Russian during parliamentary sessions.

In 2017, she urged against giving jobs and education to those who do not speak Ukrainian.

In 2018, Farion attracted controversy after commenting on an incident in Mariupol in which a serviceman reportedly had his jaw broken during a conflict at a café after requesting service in Ukrainian. In response, Farion wrote that Ukrainians should “kick every Moscow-mouthed person in the jaw”, arguing that stronger action against Russian speakers would have helped Ukraine achieve victory in the war earlier.

In April 2018, Farion called Russian-speaking Ukrainians "mentally retarded" and claimed that they had caused the Russo-Ukrainian War. Later in 2019, she emphasized that the Russian-speaking population of Eastern Ukraine are the "authors of the war" because "if there were no such [Russian speakers], Putin would have no one to protect".

In another incident in January 2023, Farion discussed her grandson’s reaction to Russian-speaking refugee children in kindergarten. She stated that her grandson had to “teach [them] Ukrainian with his little fist” and expressed approval of his behaviour, referring to Russian-speaking children in derogatory terms.

In the same month, Farion attracted controversy after comments regarding the destruction of Mariupol during the Russian invasion of Ukraine. In an interview, she described the events in Mariupol as “karmic”, arguing that they were the consequence of the previous political choices and behaviour of some residents of the city. The remarks were criticised by those who argued that they placed responsibility for Russia’s military actions on Ukrainian civilians.

=== Views on the status of English language in Ukraine ===
In January 2024, Farion criticised a draft law aimed at expanding the use of English in Ukraine. She argued that granting English a more prominent role in education and public administration could undermine the status of the Ukrainian language, describing the initiative as a threat to the development of Ukrainian. Farion claimed that no other country had adopted similar legislation giving a foreign language such privileges and compared the promotion of English with previous periods when foreign languages had a dominant role in Ukrainian society.

=== Views on feminatives ===
In April 2024, Farion criticised of the use of feminine professional titles (feminatives) in Ukrainian. She argued that forms such as profesorka (“female professor”) and doktorka (“female doctor/academic”) were unnecessary and described the wider promotion of feminatives as being driven by “gender ideology” rather than linguistic considerations. Farion stated that she did not want to be referred to using feminine forms of her academic titles and preferred the masculine forms traditionally used in Ukrainian professional contexts.

=== Views on LGBTQ rights and registered partnerships ===
In 2013, Farion stated that homosexual people should be "treated" and referred to them as "sick". She later compared Russian-speaking Ukrainians to members of the LGBT community, saying that both groups attempt to impose "pathology" on society. Farion criticised a 2023 bill that aimed to introduce legal recognition of same-sex partnerships in Ukraine. She described the initiative as a threat to traditional family values and argued that it represented an ideology harmful to Ukrainian society and state foundations.

=== Views on the Ukrainian Orthodox Church (Moscow Patriarchate) ===
In April 2018, Farion criticised the Ukrainian Orthodox Church of the Moscow Patriarchate (UOC-MP), describing its clergy as an instrument of Russian influence in Ukraine. In an interview, she accused the church of acting as a “subversive” and “ideological” organisation connected to the Russian stateand called for it to be recognised as hostile and for its property to be confiscated.

== Personal life ==
Farion was married to Ostap Semchyshyn; they had a daughter and were divorced. As of 2022, her daughter was a member of the Lviv City Council. Farion had two grandchildren.

== Awards and nominations ==
- 2001: Certificate of honor named after the president of the NTSH Mykhailo Hrushevskyi from the Board of the Shevchenko Scientific Society in America for "tireless academic activity in the field of Ukrainian studies".
- 2004: Laureate of the "Oleksa Hirnyk International League of Ukrainian Patrons Award" for "national and patriotic education of youth".
- 2008: Borys Hrinchenko Prize.
- 2010: diploma from the UOC KP for scientific activity, in particular for the monograph "Father Markian Shashkevych — ukrainian languagemaker".
- 2013: Laureate of the International award of the League of Ukrainian Patrons named after Dmytro Nytchenko "For an unerring position in life, for fighting qualities and for rank", for the project "From the book to the goal"
- 2014: Certificate of Honor of the Verkhovna Rada of Ukraine for a "significant contribution to the development of national education, improvement of the modern legal framework of education and science" (Decree No. 362 dated 19 June 2014).
- 2016: Laureate of the Ivan Ohiyenko Prize for "scientific advancements" for the monograph "The social status of the Old Ukrainian (Rusyn) language in the 14th – 17th centuries: linguistic consciousness, linguistic validity, linguistic perspective".
- 2021: Laureate of the "Regional award for employees of scientific institutions and institutions of higher education" from the Lviv Regional State Administration.
- 2022: «Certificate of honor for special merits» from the Lviv Polytechnic University.
- 2023: laureate of the Borys Hrinchenko Prize for educational activities.

== Publications ==
=== Monographs ===
- Українські прізвищеві назви Прикарпатської Львівщини наприкінці XVIII — початку XIX століття (з етимологічним словником)[Ukrainian family names of the Carpathian Lviv Region at the end of 18th – beginning of 19th centuries (with etymological dictionary)]. National Academy of Sciences of Ukraine, Institute of folklore studies. "Litopys". Lviv, 2001.
- Антропонімійна система Верхньої Наддністрянщини кінця XVIII — початку XIX ст. (прізвищеві назви)[Antroponymy system of the Upper Dniester region at the end of 18th – beginning of 19th centuries (family names)]. Franko State University. Lviv, 1996 (Ph.D. thesis).
- Мова — краса і сила: Суспільно-креативна роль української мови в ХІ — середині XIX ст[Language — beauty and force; societally-creative role of the Ukrainian language in 11th – middle of 19th centuries]. 168 pages, Lviv Polytechnic publishing, 2007 ISBN 978-966-553-586-7
- Отець Маркіян Шашкевич — український мовотворець. Лінгвістичний феномен на тлі світового романтизму[Father Markian Shashkevych — ukrainian languagemaker. Linguistic phenomen in the background of worldwide romantism]. 136 pages, "Svichado" publishing, 2007 ISBN 978-966-395-121-8
- Правопис — корсет мови?: Український правопис як культурно-політичний вибір[Spelling — the language's corset?: Ukrainian spelling as a cultural and a political choice]. 115 pages, St. John's Lavra Monastery, "Svichado" publishing, 2004 ISBN 966-561-328-6
- Степан Бандера — практик, теоретик, містик націоналістичного руху. Лекція Ірини Фаріон з нагоди столітнього ювілею Провідника[Stepan Bandera — practitioner, theoretician, mystician of the nationalist movement. Lecture by Iryna Farion on the occasion of the 100th anniversary of the Guide]. 32 pages + CD-disk, Ivano-Frankivsk "Місто НВ", 2009 ISBN 978-966-428-123-9
- Мовна норма: знищення, пошук, віднова[Language Norm: Destruction, Search, Restoration (Culture of Speech of Public Figures)]. 336 pages + CD-disk, Ivano-Frankivsk "Місто НВ", 2010 ISBN 978-966-428-138-3
- Афоризми та сентенції Юрія Іллєнка Криниця для спраглих[Aphorisms and maxims of Yuri Illenko, A fountain for the thirsty](Author of the idea, compiler and literary editor Iryna Farion, along with Lyudmyla Illyenko, Pylyp Illyenko, Andrii Illyenko), 160 pages, Ivano-Frankivsk "Місто НВ", 2010 ISBN 978-966-428-169-7
- Суспільний статус староукраїнської (руської) мови у ХIV—ХVII століттях: мовна свідомість, мовна дійсність, мовна перспектива[The social status of the Old Ukrainian (Rusyn) language in the 14th – 17th centuries: linguistic consciousness, linguistic validity, linguistic perspective]. 656 pages, Lviv Polytechnic publishing, 2015 ISBN 978-617-607-718-3
- Мовний портрет Івана Пулюя (за листами мислителя)[Language portrait of Ivan Pulyuy (based on the thinker's letters)]. 215 pages, Lviv Polytechnic publishing, 2017 ISBN 978-966-941-076-4
- Мовна норма: пошук істини. Посібник[Language norm: the search for truth. Manual]. 255 pages, Ivano-Frankivsk "Місто НВ", 2017 ISBN 978-966-428-517-6

=== Monographs with other authors ===
- Slovo v kultuře a kultura ve slově: Kolektivni monografie / prof. Alla Arkhanhelska, DrSc. Vydala a vytiskla Univerzita Palackého v Olomouci[The word in culture and culture in the word]. Collective monograph prof. Alla Arkhanhelska, DrSc. Published and printed by Palacký University in Olomouc, 2014. (pages 215—229)
- Українознавство в персоналіях — у системі вищої медичної освіти[Ukrainian studies in personalities - in the system of higher medical education. Monograph. The third book]. (pages 316—335) Ivano-Frankivsk, 2019 ISBN 978-966-428-498-8
- Український науковий термін: діахронний контекст. Монографія[Ukrainian scientific term: diachronic context. Monograph]. (pages 50–71) Halytska Publishing Union, Lviv, 2019 ISBN 978-617-7809-05-9
- Українська реальність крізь призму терміна: монографія[Ukrainian reality through the prism of the term: monograph]. (pages 47–93) Lviv Polytechnic publishing, 2019 ISBN 978-966-941-414-4
- Термінологічна актуалізація української мовної дійсности: монографія[Terminological actualization of the Ukrainian linguistic reality: a monograph]. (pages 5–59) Halytska Publishing Union, Lviv, 2020 ISBN 978-617-7809-53-0
- Українознавство в персоналіях — у системі вищої медичної освіти. Монографія. Книга п'ята. Івано-Франківськ[Ukrainian studies in personalities - in the system of higher medical education. Monograph. Book five]. (pages 185—215) Ivano-Frankivsk, 2022
- Полігранна філологія без кордонів: колективна монографія[Multifaceted philology without borders: a collective monograph]. (pages 127—141) Ivanchenka publishing, Kharkiv, 2022
- Wrocławska Ukrainistyka. Lingua — Litterae — Sermo[Wroclaw Ukrainian Studies. Lingua — Litterae — Sermo. Collective monograph]. (pages 79–90) Atut Publishing House — Oświatwe publishing, Wrocław, 2022
- Мовознавча комісія НТШ. З історії людей та ідей[Linguistic Commission of the National Academy of Sciences. From the history of people and ideas]. Lviv Polytechnic publishing, 2023.
- Англізми і протианглізми: 100 історій слів у соціоконтексті[Englishisms and anti-Englishisms: 100 stories of words in social context]. 714 pages, Iryna Farion, Halyna Pomyluyko-Nedashkivska, Anna Bordovska, "Svichado" publishing, Lviv, 2023 ISBN 978-617-7809-53-0

=== Published under scientific editorship and others ===
- Петро Билина. Війна кличе. Стань переможцем! Нотатки на полях російсько-української війни. Iryna Farion as a foreword author and editor. 168 pages, Kyiv: Ukrainian Priority, 2017.
- Проблеми української термінології: зб. наук. пр. учасників XV Міжнар. наук. конф. «Проблеми укр. термінології СловоСвіт 2018», 83 pages, Lviv Polytechnic publishing. ISBN 978-966-941-210-2
- Добірка студій професора Михайла Худаша: історична ономастика, мовні портрети, спогади. За науковою редакцією І. Д. Фаріон. 440 pages, Lviv Polytechnic publishing, 2019. ISBN 978-966-941-336-9.
- Наука своєю мовою — нездоланна твердиня. Збірник матеріялів відкритих Пулюївських читань / науковий редактор: І. Д. Фаріон. 215 pages, Lviv Polytechnic publishing, 2019. ISBN 978-966-941-300-0.
- Фаріон Ірина Дмитрівна: Біобібліографічний показник: / Упор. О. Микитюк, Л. Харчук, І. Ментинська. 168 pages, Lviv Polytechnic publishing, 2019. ISBN 978-966-941-319-2.
- Щастя бути сильним. Афоризми та сентенції Дмитра Донцова. Автор ідеї та укладач: Оксана Микитюк. Науковий консультант: Ірина Фаріон. 392 pages, Lviv Polytechnic publishing, 2021.
- Проблеми української термінології: зб. наук. праць учасників XVII Наук. онлайн-конф. СловоСвіт 2022, 6–8 жовт. 2022 р. / Головний редактор: Ірина Фаріон. — Lviv Polytechnic publishing, 2022. ISBN 978-966-941-755-8

== Bibliography ==
- Микитюк, Оксана Романівна; Харчук, Лілія Валеріївна; Ментинська, Ірина Богданівна (2019). Фаріон Ірина Дмитрівна: доктор філологічних наук, професор : біобібліографічний показник (in Ukrainian). Vydavnyctvo Lʹvivsʹkoï politechniky. ISBN 978-966-941-319-2. Archived from the original on 2 August 2024.
