= Alexander Skibnevsky =

Alexander Bronislavovich Skibnevsky
- Александр Брониславович Скибневский
- Born: April 8, 1903; Moscow, Moscow Oblast, Russian Empire
- Died: April 20, 1978 (aged 75)

Alexander Bronislavovich Skibnevsky (Russian: Александр Брониславович Скибневский; 8 April [O.S. 26 March] 1903 – 20 April 1978) was a Soviet director, teacher and a practitioner and theorist of theatre. Awards he attained included Merited Artist of the Udmurt Autonomous Soviet Socialist Republic (1945) and the Belarusian Soviet Socialist Republic (1952).

== Biography ==
Skibnevsky was born on April 8, 1903, in Moscow, Russian Empire. His mother Evelina and father Bronislav were from Grodno Poles (Belarus) and moved to Moscow in 1900.

In the period 1918 to 1921 he was in the prodarmy (the 'food acquisition army') as part of the Prodrazverstka campaign. From 1921 to 1924 he worked at the 'Hammer and sickle factory' (Moscow Metallurgical Plant), while simultaneously studying at the State Institute of the Word (Institute of the Living Word).

In 1925 he graduated from the directing department of the state experimental theatre workshops (Russian: ГОСТИМ, ГЭКТЕМАС). From 1926 to 1928 he was the artistic director of the Chita theatre (Chita). In 1929–1930 he was the artistic director of the Turkmen theatre in Ashgabat (later renamed the Pushkin State Russian Drama Theatre). From 1931 to 1933 he was the artistic director of the Polish theatre in Kyiv. On July 3, 1933, Skibnevsky was arrested and held in Kievskoye Dobr together with 23 representatives of the Polish intelligentsia on the fabricated GPU (secret police) of the Ukrainian SSR case of the POW (Polska Organizacja Wojskowa: Polish Military Organisation). On February 23, 1934, he was accused of counterrevolutionary work among the Poles on behalf of Et. The troika of the GPU (secret police) of the Ukrainian SSR board sentenced him to five years under Articles 54–2, 54-II. Subsequently, the sentence was changed to exile for 3 years.

From 1940 to 1946 he was the artistic director of the State Russian Drama Theatre named after V. Korolenko in Izhevsk. From 1946 to 1947 he was the chief director of the Kirov Theatre, and from 1947 to 1949 he was the chief director of the Ulyanovsk Theatre (Ulyanovsk).

For ten years from 1949 to 1958 he was the chief director of the Yakub Kolas Drama Theatre, Vitebsk. From 1958 to 1963 he was the chief director of the Pushkin Kharkov Russian Drama Theatre (Kharkiv).

From 1958, he taught directing at the Kharkiv Institute of Arts, and from 1962 headed the department of directing at the Kharkiv State Academy of Culture.

He was the author of numerous works on theatre issues, and wrote several plays and monographs.

Skibnevsky died on April 20, 1978, in Kharkiv, USSR.

== Published works ==
- Skibnevsky O. Playwright (Скибневський О. Драматург — театр — глядач) // Прапор. — 1961. — No. 6.
- Skibnevsky A. People's Artist A. K. Ilyinsky (Скибневский А. Народный артист А. К. Ильинский.) — Minsk. — 1954.
- "Can't forget" (Ukrainian: Не можна забути, Russian: Нельзя забыть}}) — романтична хроніка в 4 діях, 10 картинах.
- Intelligence // Helping young directors (Розвідка розумом // На допомогу молодим режисерам). Kyiv, 1965. С. 78–94.
- Reflections on folk theaters (Роздуми про народні театри // Ukrainian theatre). 1972. С. 17–18.
- Club directing: educational and methodological manual (Клубна режисура: учб.-метод. посіб.) / О. Б. Скибневський, М. В. Авах, М. М. Мушкіна та ін. Харків (Kharkiv), 1973. 122 с.

== Productions ==
- "Public Affairs" of B. Yasensky (Russian: "Общественное дело"; 1930)
- "Street of Joy" of Nathan Zarcha ("Улица радости"; 1931)
- "Raban" of Vandursky ("Рабан"; 1932)
- "William Tell" of F. Schiller ("Уильям Телл"; 1933)
- "Love Yarovaya" of Trenyov ("Любовь Яровая"; 1938)
- "Russian People" of Simonov ("Русские люди"; 1942)
- "Storm" of Ostrovsky ("Гроза"; 1943)
- "The fruits of enlightenment" of Tolstoy ("Плоды Просвещения; 1945, 1959)
- "Russian questions" of Simonov ("Русские вопросы"; 1947)
- "The Young Guard" of Aleksin ("Молодая гвардия"; 1947)
- "Day of Wonderful Deceptions" of Robert Sheridan ("День чудесных обманов"; 1948)
- "Three Sisters" of Chekhov ("Три сестры"; 1950)
- "Family" of A. Popov ("Семья"; 1950)
- "At the Bottom" of Gorcky ("На дне"; 1951)
- "The ruined nest" of Kupala ("Разорённое гнездо"; 1952)
- "Excuse me, please" of Makayonka ("Извините, будьте добры"; 1954)
- "Light from the East" of Glebka ("Свет с востока"; 1958)
- "People and devils" of Kropiva ("Люди и дьяволы"; 1958)
- "The Last Sky" of Muratov ("Последнее облако"; 1959)
- "The Ershov brothers" (V. A. Kochetov; "Братья Ершовы"; 1959)
- "Irkutsk history" of Arbuzov ("Иркутская история"; 1960)
