= Kharkiv State Academy of Culture =

Public university in Kharkiv, Ukraine

Coordinates: 48.3042°N 38.0181°E

- Харківська державна академія культури Kharkivska derzhavna academia kultury
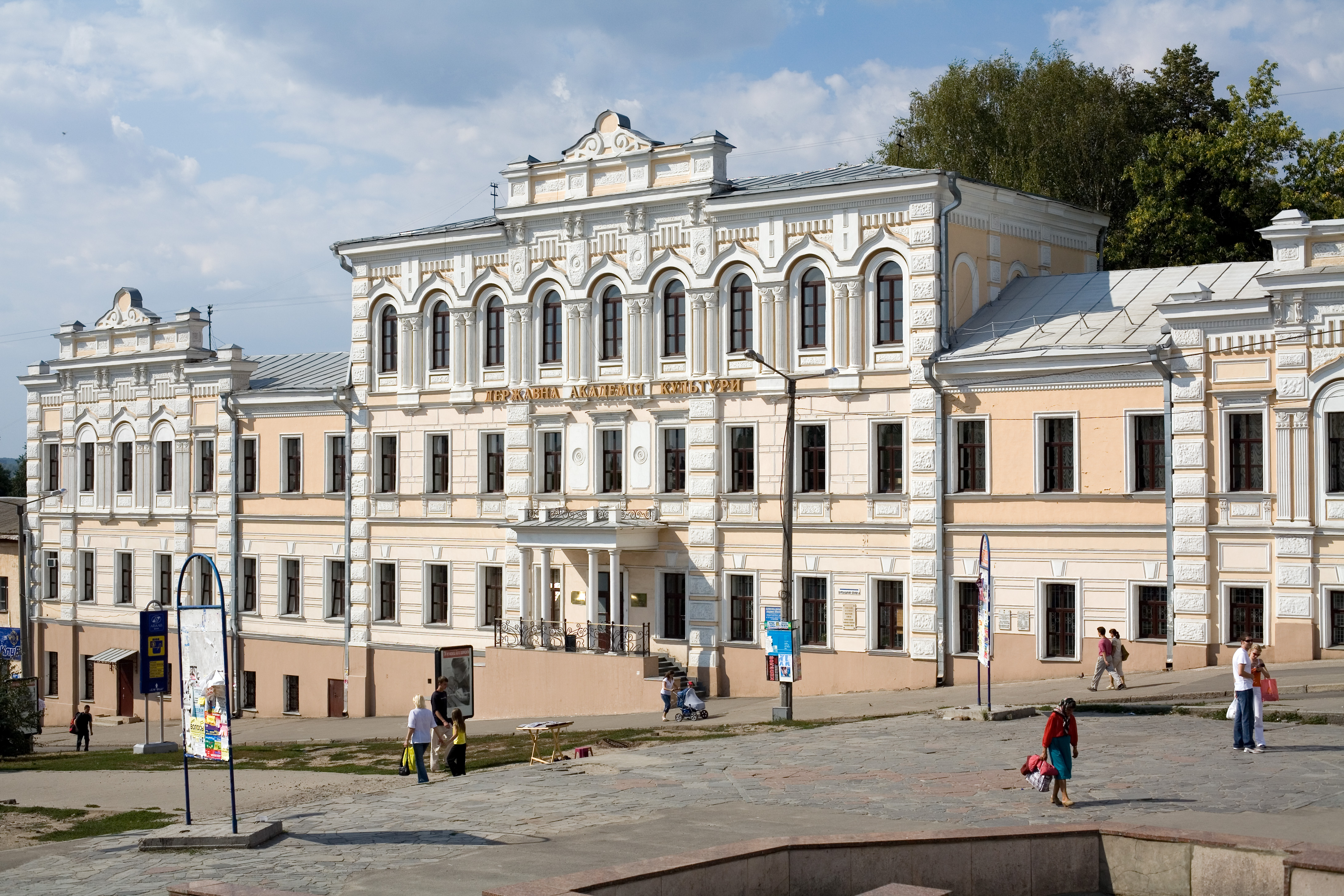
- Motto: University studeatur mundi
- Established: 10 September 1929
- Accreditation: Ministry of Education and Science of Ukraine
- Rector: Natalia Ryabukha
- Students: 2573
- Location: Kharkiv, Ukraine
- Website: ic.ac.kharkov.ua

Immovable Monument of Local Significance of Ukraine
- Official name: Будинок бурси (Bursa building)
- Type: Architecture
- Reference no.: 17-Ха

Kharkiv State Academy of Culture (Ukrainian: Харківська державна академія культури) is a former Ukrainian State Academy in Kharkiv.

== History ==
The academy was created on September 10, 1929 as the Institute of Political Education out of the Kharkiv Institute of National Education (1921-1933) which was a temporary school in place of University of Kharkiv. In a year the school was renamed into the Kharkiv Institute of Political Education and next year - the All-Ukrainian Institute of Communist Education.

During that time the institute had seven departments: librarian, book marketing, scholar, museum, tourist, atheistic, and mass-agitation.

In July 1935 the institute was transformed into the Ukrainian Library Institute that included just two librarian departments. In 1939 the school was renamed into the Ukrainian State Library Institute.

During World War II the institute folded and once again became department of the University of Kharkiv which was evacuated to Kyzylorda in the Kazakh SSR. After the war it was once again reestablished in June 1947 back in Kharkiv as the State Library Institute. In 1950 there was opened a department of cultural education.

Finally in 1964 the institute was transformed into the Kharkiv State Institute of Culture.

In 1979, during the celebration of the 50th anniversary of the institute, the Government awarded the KhDIK a Diploma of the Presidium of the Verkhovna Rada of Ukraine.

After the fall of the Soviet Union many other departments were opened in the institute such as legal studies, musical folk art, culturology, choreography, foreign students relations and others. On June 8, 1998 the institute was renamed into the Kharkiv State Academy of Culture.

== Campuses and buildings ==
In the historical center of Kharkiv stands the Kharkiv State Academy of Culture. There are five buildings with 106 lecture rooms, an assembly hall, a gymnasium, and a student theatre.

The balance of the Academy includes 5 educational buildings and 2 dormitories. Classrooms, laboratories and offices are located in five buildings, three of which were built in the early 19th century, and the other two in the late 19th to early 20th century. All five buildings are fully adapted to educational needs. In addition, additional specialized choreographic classrooms, reading rooms and classrooms for independent work of students of the Faculty of Music with the appropriate tools are equipped in non-residential premises on the first floor of the dormitories of the academy. The training area of the buildings is 12,432 square meters. m, ie 8 m² per student.

The academy has two dormitories with a total area of 15,311.7 m2, in which foreign and non-resident students live. The academy has a modern computer base, represented by a computer center, 13 training laboratories (243 personal computers), a computerized library, which are integrated into a local network that has access to the Internet through non-switched telecommunications channels. The scientific and pedagogical staff of the academy is fruitfully working on creating its own information and educational environment (electronic versions of software and methodological complexes).

Since 1998, the KhDAK has been developing an electronic full-text database of textbooks, teaching materials and scientific works of teachers and students, which allows the introduction of distance learning and retraining.

The book fund of the library is 312,032 copies, of which 196,007 are educational literature. The library has an electronic catalog and 6 databases, a collection of special educational, methodical, reference and periodicals has been collected in the offices and laboratories of the departments, models of information retrieval systems have been developed.

== Institutes and faculties ==
- Faculty of Library and Information Science
- Faculty of Document Studies and Information Management
- Faculty of Management
- Faculty of Cultural Studies. The Faculty of Cultural Studies includes the following departments:
  - Department of Journalism
  - Department of Cultural Studies
  - Department of Culture Management and Social Technologies
  - Department of Foreign Languages
  - Direction "Culturology"
  - Direction "Management of socio-cultural activities"
  - Direction "Journalism"
- Faculty of Music and Art
- Faculty of Theatre Art
- Faculty of Cinema and Television Arts
- Faculty of Choreographic Art

== Awards and reputation ==
The academy ranked 152nd in the rating “Top 200 Ukraine” of the institutions of higher education of Ukraine in 2011 (“Dzerkalo tyzhnia” #20 of June 4, 2011).

It ranked 10th in the annual rating of institutions of higher education “Compass” (“Segodnia” of May 16, 2012).

According to the rating of the best institutions of higher education of Ukraine, composed by Institute of Innovation Technologies of the Ministry of Education and Science, Youth and Sports of Ukraine, KhSAC took 9th place among institutions of higher education in the sphere of culture, arts and design (“Osvita Ukrainy”, # 26 of June 25, 2012).

== Notable people ==
- Pavlo Aldoshyn, film actor and sniper with the Ukrainian military, known for his role in the 2022 film Sniper: The White Raven.
- Victor Skumin, from 1990 to 1994 held positions as Professor by the Chair of Psychology and Pedagogy, and Professor by the Chair of Physical Education and Health life at the Academy. Skumin completed research of theoretical and practical issues of culture of health, which he developed throughout his scientific and pedagogical activity. These methods, he has introduced in the training course for the students of the Academy: "The Foundations of a Culture of Health.
- Alexander Skibnevsky headed the department of directing from 1962.

== See also ==
List of universities in Ukraine
