= Nina Marushina =

Russian actress (1935–2026)

- Нина Марушина
- Born: 16 May 1935; Saratov, Russian SFSR, Soviet Union
- Died: 2 June 2026 (aged 91); Moscow, Russia
- Occupation: Actress
- Years active: 1962–2026
- Employer: Pushkin Drama Theatre
- Spouse: Valentin Burov (died 2009)
- Awards: Merited Artist of the Russian Federation (1995); Order of Friendship (2020); Medal of the Order "For Merit to the Fatherland", 2nd class (2001); Medal "Veteran of Labour" (1991); Medal "In Commemoration of the 850th Anniversary of Moscow" (1997)

Nina Aleksandrovna Marushina (Russian: Нина Александровна Марушина; 16 May 1935 – 2 June 2026) was a Soviet and Russian stage and film actress. She spent over six decades as a resident actress at the Pushkin Drama Theatre in Moscow (1962–2026) and was named a Merited Artist of the Russian Federation in 1995.

== Early life and career ==
Nina Aleksandrovna Marushina was born on 16 May 1935 in Saratov, Russian SFSR, Soviet Union.

She initially studied at the Faculty of Philology at Saratov State University. She later moved to Moscow to pursue acting, graduating from the Moscow Art Theatre School in 1962 under the tutelage of G. A. Gerasimov and Aleksandr Karev. Immediately following her graduation, she joined the company of the Pushkin Drama Theatre, where she went on to perform on stage for more than 60 years.

Among her most notable theatre achievements were the roles of Zinaida Vasilyevna in Days of Our Lives, the Nanny in The Scarlet Flower, Korobkin's wife in Nikolai Gogol's The Government Inspector, and Marcella in The Legend of Paganini.

In 1971, Marushina made her screen acting debut, portraying Lilya Dyakova in the television play production Day by Day directed by Vsevolod Shilovsky.

== Personal life and death ==
Marushina was married to Valentin Evgenievich Burov (31 December 1938 – 16 April 2009), who was also a Merited Artist of the Russian Federation and a fellow actor ensemble member at the Pushkin Drama Theatre.

Marushina died in Moscow on 2 June 2026, at the age of 91, following a prolonged illness.
