= Pavlo Aldoshyn =

Ukrainian actor and sniper (born 1987)

- Павло Алдошин
- Born: 2 October 1987 (age 38); Semikhatki, Kherson Oblast, Ukraine
- Education: Kharkiv State Academy of Culture
- Occupations: Sniper; actor
- Years active: 2009–present
- Military career
- Allegiance: Ukraine
- Branch: Ukrainian Ground Forces
- Service years: 2022–
- Conflicts: Russo-Ukrainian war; Battle of Bucha; Battle of Irpin; Battle of Bakhmut

Pavlo Anatoliyovych Aldoshyn (Note: Ukrainian: Павло Анатолійович Алдошин) (born 2 October 1987) is a Ukrainian theatre and film actor, and a sniper in the Ukrainian Armed Forces.

== Biography ==
Aldoshyn was born on 2 October 1987 near Henichesk, in the village of Semikhatki, Henichesk Raion, Kherson Oblast, and studied at the Kharkiv State Academy of Culture, beginning his career in 2009 when he became an actor at a local Kharkiv theatre, where he remained until 2016.

He became internationally recognized by portraying the main role in the 2022 Ukrainian war movie Sniper: The White Raven, where he interprets a pacifist teacher living in the Donbas when pro-Russian militias launch an offensive with support of Russian forces in Donetsk and Luhansk Oblasts in 2014 and the subsequent outbreak of the Russo-Ukrainian war. Aldoshyn, who had grown up as a Russian speaker, said later that he switched to speaking Ukrainian during the filming of the movie, adding that he began practising through jokes and adapting Ukrainian to his local dialects.

Following Russia's full-scale invasion of Ukraine in February 2022, Aldoshyn enlisted in the Ukrainian Armed Forces and served as a sniper in multiple fronts, including Bucha, Irpin, and Bakhmut, and still serves as an active member in the war. He has expressed his wish to return to his acting career when the war ends.

In March 2024, Aldoshyn strongly criticized nationalist deputies Iryna Farion and Bohdan Beniuk over their comments about Russian-speaking Ukrainians in the armed forces, whom Farion described as "deluded" and "unpatriotic", refusing to recognize them as Ukrainians. In response to Farion's statements, Aldoshyn said that no one outside the military should instruct soldiers on how to communicate between them, describing life-or-death situations on the frontline, where language is an important part of the soldier's identification.
