= Mykola Kniazhytskyi =

Ukrainian journalist and politician

- Микола Княжицький
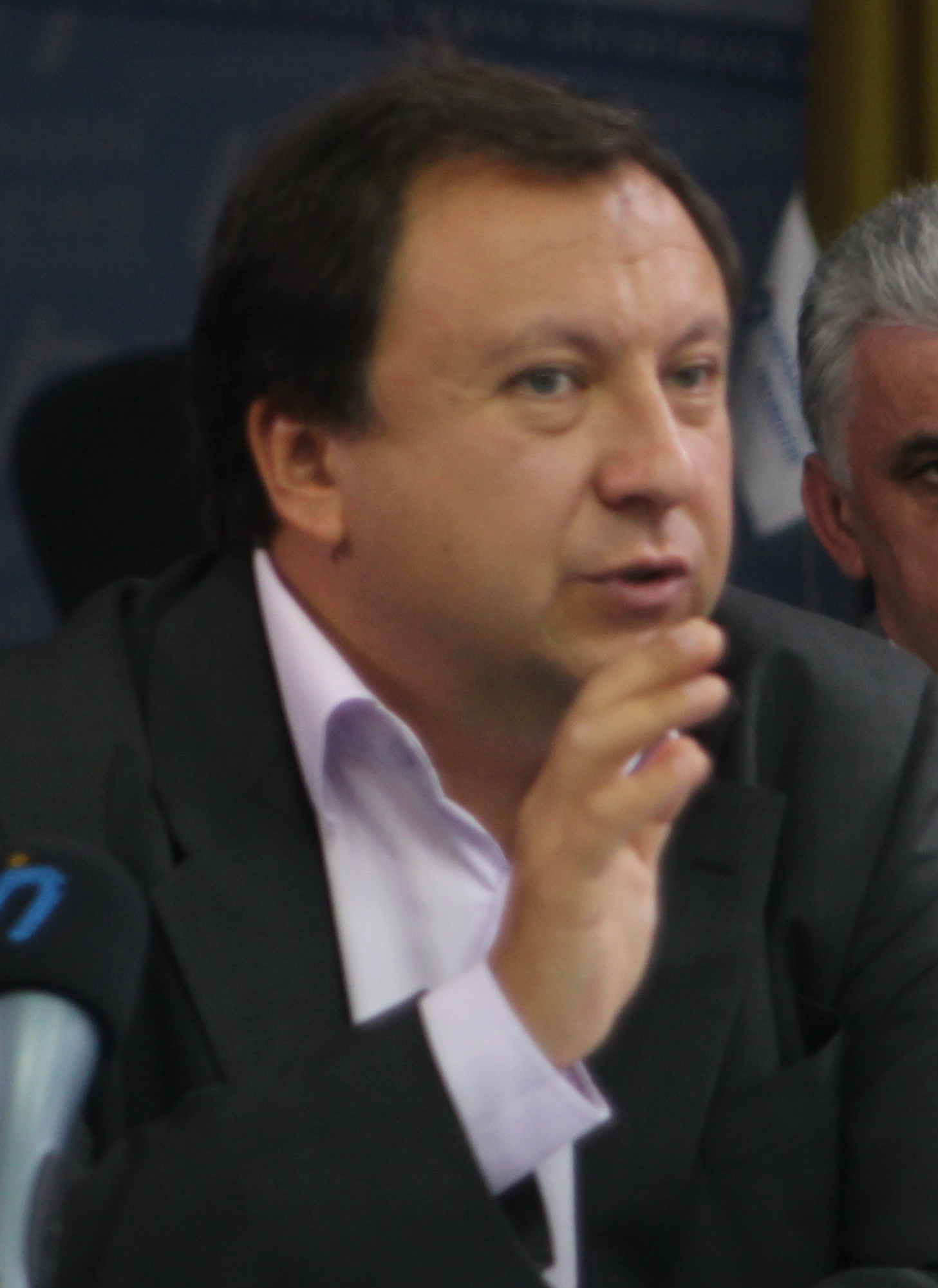

People's Deputy of Ukraine
- Incumbent
- Assumed office 12 December 2012
- Preceded by: Iryna Podoliak (2019)
- Constituency: Lviv Oblast, No. 116 (since 2019); People's Front, No. 34 (2014–2019); Batkivshchyna, No. 11 (2012–2014)

Personal details
- Born: 2 June 1968 (age 58) Lviv, Ukrainian SSR, Soviet Union (now Ukraine)
- Party: European Solidarity
- Other political affiliations: People's Front; Batkivshchyna
- Spouse: Larysa Frantsivna
- Children: Leonid; Anastasiia; Anton
- Education: Kyiv State University, faculty of journalism (1992); National University of Lviv, faculty of international law and business
- Occupation: Journalist, TV host, film producer

Mykola Leonidovych Kniazhytskyi (Ukrainian: Мико́ла Леоні́дович Княжи́цький; born 2 June 1968) is a Ukrainian journalist and politician currently serving as a People's Deputy of Ukraine. He is head of the Committee on Culture and Spirituality, co-head of group for interparliamentary relations with the Republic of Poland, and head of EU-Ukraine Parliamentary Association Committee.

In the past, Mykola Kniazhytskyi held key positions in media companies and Tonis, STB, and UT-1 TV channels, was head of Hazeta 24. Mykola Kniazhytskyi was a member of the National Council of Television and Radio Broadcasting of Ukraine. Kniazhytskyi is a member of the Austrian International Press Institute, and is producer of a number of documentaries.

== Early life ==
Mykola Kniazhytskyi was born on 2 June 1968, into a family of educators. In 1985, Kniazhytskyi entered the Faculty of Journalism at Kyiv University and obtained a diploma in 1992.

In the late 1990s, Mykola Kniazhytskyi obtained second degree at the Faculty of International Law and Business of the Institute of Postgraduate education of Lviv University.

== Early career ==
After service in the army from June 1986 to May 1988, Mykola Kniazhytskyi began to work in the area of expertise and combined work with study. From February 1989 to January 1991, Kniazhytskyi was a special correspondent of the editorial board of the State TV and Radio Broadcasting of the USSR, hosted "Vechirni Novyny" (the Evening News) TV program and was a correspondent of the Central Television in Ukraine (the Television News Service).

From February 1991 to January 1992, Kniazhytskyi was Head of the correspondent office of joint Soviet-Canadian TV and Radio "Mist" (the Bridge) enterprise. He was a Ukrainian correspondent of the program "Viesti" ^{ru} of Russian State TV and Radio Company, which has been broadcast since 13 May 1991.

From February to June 1992, Kniazhytskyi was a special correspondent for political analysis and forecast of the State TV and Radio Broadcaster of Ukraine, and a co-host of Oleksandr Tkachenko in "Vikna" (the Windows) program. From July 1992 to November 1994, Mykola Kniazhytskyi was Director of the Television Creativity Center ("Vikna" TV program). He is one of the founders of "UNIKA", a network of non-governmental television stations.

In 1992, a lawsuit for defamation was initiated against Kniazhytskyi. The lawsuit was conducted by Bolibok, Head of the Main Investigations Directorate of the Prosecutor General of Ukraine. Yuriy Aivazian and Viktor Nikazakov were lawyers in the case. The lawsuit was closed after a few months due to groundlessness under media and public pressure.

From December 1994 to October 1998, Kniazhytskyi was President of "International Media Center — STB" CJSC, hosted program "Reitynh" (the Rating). Since 1997, Kniazhytskyi was President of STB TV channel and hosted "Vikna-tyzhnevyk" (the Windows-weekly) TV program.

Since September 1998, Kniazhytskyi was president, and from 2 October 1998 to 17 November 1998, he was chairman of the board of the State Joint-Stock Company "Ukrainian Television and Radio Broadcasting" and President of "National Television Company of Ukraine".

From December 1998 to April 1999, Kniazhytskyi was Chairman of the Administrative Council of "International Media Center – STB". CJSC.

Between 16 March 1999 and 20 April 2000, and later from 18 May 2000 to 29 March 2002, Kniazhytskyi was a member of the National Council of Television and Radio Broadcasting of Ukraine (based on quota of the Verkhovna Rada). While vacationing during the balloting to the Verkhovna Rada, Kniazhytskyi was prematurely removed from his position.

Kniazhytskyi was director and co-owner (9% of shares) of the "Mediadim" company that owned assets of Tonis and Hazeta 24. After a number of journalists, including Vitaly Portnikov, resigned and accused the owners of attempts to impose censorship (Oleksandr Kosterin was identified as a person likely to be the main beneficiary), Mykola Kniazhytskyi also left the company in November 2007. He publicly announced about illegal takeover of his share by Kosterin, who at that time was the Head of the Party of Greens of Ukraine.

In 2008, Mykola Kniazhytskyi with the part of employees who left "MediaDim" launched a new project, TBi TV channel ("International Media Company"). Kniazhytskyi holds the position of general manager of TBi and hosts weekly TV program "Vechir z Mykoloiu Kniazhytskym" (An evening with Mykola Kniazhytskyi).

In April 2012, Kniazhytskyi reported on the pressure of tax authorities on TBi TV channel, as despite the fact that a few months before the channel had already been checked, there was another tax audit on the TBi. Two weeks later Kniazhytskyi reported that officers of the tax police "began to terrorize" people who provided services to the TV channel.

The press service of then-President Viktor Yanukovych released a statement that the President expressed his concern and ordered to check the legality of the case. At the same time, cable network "Triolan" disconnected TBi in 11 cities of Ukraine without notice. The representative of the organization "Reporters Without Borders" called this event an intimidation of Ukrainian journalists before the elections. The USA urged Ukrainian authorities to stop the prosecution of this case and to ensure media pluralism and independence. As a result, Prosecutor's Office reversed the ruling of the tax police to initiate criminal proceedings against Mykola Kniazhytskyi.

In 2013, Mykola Kniazhytskyi founded a new media project, Espreso TV channel. He hosted "Kniazhytskyi", TV program that focuses on interviews with interesting personalities on major political and social issues. Espreso gained popularity during the Euromaidan and became the main TV channel of Ukraine, which broadcast from the hottest spots of conflict in Kyiv. The channel became one of the most popular information resources of Ukraine, which promoted Ukrainian views of the world and provided up-to-date news about events in Ukraine and in the world. Among the popular TV programs of the channel there are information-analytical programs such as "Politklub" (Political Club), "Ch/B Show" (Black and White Show), "Pro polityku" (About politics), "SHUSTROVA LIVE", "Vartovi Espresso", "PRO zdorovia", "Vechir z Yehorom Checheryndoyu" etc.

== Political career ==
Mykola Kniazhytskyi was a self-nominated candidate in the 2002 Ukrainian parliamentary election in Ukraine's 117th electoral district, in Lviv Oblast. He lost the election to Pavlo Kachur from Our Ukraine, and took the second place with 14.4% of votes. Kniazhytskyi sued for the results of voting but lost in the court of appeal of Lviv Oblast. Kniazhytskyi stated that his sudden dismissal from the post of a member of the National Council of Television and Radio Broadcasting of Ukraine was related to his balloting to the Verkhovna Rada.

On 30 July 2012, it was announced that Kniazhytskyi was again a candidate for People's Deputy of Ukraine, this time as the eleventh candidate on the party list of Batkivshchyna. For the time of campaign, he took a leave from his post of Director General of TBi. After becoming People's Deputy, he led the subcommittee on television and radio of the Committee of the Verkhovna Rada on issues of freedom of speech and information. In the 2014 Ukrainian parliamentary election, Kniazhytskyi was re-elected as a People's Deputy of Ukraine, this time as a member of the People's Front party list. From 4 December 2014, he was Head of the Committee on Culture and Spirituality of the Verkhovna Rada of Ukraine.

In 2016, Mykola Kniazhytskyi was elected Head of EU-Ukraine Parliamentary Association Committee and Co-Head of group for interparliamentary relations with the Republic of Poland.

As a Head of EU-Ukraine Parliamentary Association Committee, together with other People's Deputies, he makes efforts to accelerate European integration and implementation of European standards into the national legislation. Mykola Kniazhytskyi was a member of group for interparliamentary relations with the French Republic, the Republic of Lithuania, Israel, Latvia, Australia, Canada and the United States of America.

As Co-Head of the group, he works on deepening the cooperation and intercultural dialogue of both countries.

As People's Deputy of Ukraine, Mykola Kniazhytskyi directs his legislative initiatives to support the development of cultural institutions and reform cultural industry. Thus, Kniazhytskyi is the author of the Law of Ukraine "On Amendments to Some Laws of Ukraine Concerning the Improvement of Public Administration in the field of Book Provision" (draft law No. 3084), which fostered the establishment of the Ukrainian Book Institute as an executive authority, whose task is to implement public policy in the field of book provision, promotion of Ukrainian books and reading, support of public libraries. On 27 November 2015, Kniazhytskyi, as one of the co-authors, introduced draft law No. 3081 to the Verkhovna Rada of Ukraine "On State Support of Cinematography in Ukraine", which was adopted by the Verkhovna Rada on January 28, 2016, and has not yet been signed by the President of Ukraine. The draft law introduces mechanisms of state support of national cinematography, and enhances measures of fight against Internet piracy.

Kniazhytskyi is one of the authors of draft law "On Amendments to Some Laws of Ukraine on Introduction of Contractual Form of Work in the field of Culture and Competitive Process of Appointment of the Head of State or Municipal Cultural Institution" (No. 2669). In addition, Kniazhytskyi initiated draft law No. 4303 "On Amendments to Some Laws of Ukraine Regarding the Limitation of Use of Media Production of the Aggressor State" aimed to protection of national interests and fight against Russian propaganda. The Verkhovna Rada of Ukraine did not uphold the draft law.

In 2014, Kniazhytskyi initiated the Law of Ukraine "On Amendments to Some Laws of Ukraine to Ensure the Transparency of Ownership of the Media, as well as Implementation of Principles of Public Policy in the field of Television and Radio Broadcasting". Because of the adoption of the Law, the disclosure of the information about the ownership structure of information activity is provided, that thus protects the rights of viewers and listeners, which must be aware of who stands behind a particular media resource and affects its information policy.

On April 9, 2015, he voted in favor of recognizing the status of fighters for the independence of Ukraine in the 20th century of all nationalist formations, including those participating in the occupation of modern Ukrainian lands on the side of the German Empire and the Third Reich.

In 2016, the Law drafted by Kniazhytskyi "On Amendments to the Law of Ukraine 'On Copyright and Related Rights' regarding the use of copyright objects in parodies and caricatures" was adopted.

On 27 October 2016, Mykola Kniazhytskyi together with Deputy Viktoria Siumar registered draft law No. 5313 "On Amendments to Some Laws of Ukraine on the Language of Audiovisual (Electronic) Media", proposing mandatory quotas for TV programs and films in Ukrainian.

In the 2019 Ukrainian parliamentary election he was re-elected to the Verkhovna Rada, this time from Ukraine's 116th electoral district in Lviv Oblast as a candidate of European Solidarity. He received 23.05% of the vote.

== Personal life and family ==
In addition to his native Ukrainian, Kniazhytskyi speaks English, Polish and Russian. He is interested in literature. Kniazhytskyi is married to Larysa Frantsivna Kniazhytska (née Chekhovska, born 1970), a fellow university student who is currently a press manager. Together, they have three children; sons Leonid Mykolaiovych Kniazhytskyi (born 1992) and Anton Mykolaiovych Kniazhytskyi (born 2014), and daughter Anastasiia Mykolaivna Kniazhytska (born 2005).

== Links ==
- "Blog of Mykola Kniazhytskyi". Ukrayinska Pravda. Archived from the original on 6 July 2013.
- "The page of Mykola Kniazhytskyi". Facebook.
