= National Socialism / White Power =

Russian Neo-Nazi extremist group

National Socialism / White Power Crew
- Other name: Sparrows Crew; Crew/White Power; NS/WP Nevograd
- Leader: None
- Dates active: 2004–present
- Country: Russia
- Allegiance: Combat Organization of Russian Nationalists, National Socialist Society
- Active regions: Russia, Ukraine
- Ideology: Neo-Nazism; Ultranationalism; White nationalism; Racism; Antisemitism; Xenophobia; Anti-immigration; Straight Edge
- Political position: Far-right
- Status: Banned in 21 May 2021, still active
- Website: ns-wp.ws (banned and defunct); nswp.net (banned); nswp.team (current)

National Socialism / White Power Crew (NS/WP Crew, also known as Sparrows Crew), is a neo-Nazi extremist group operating in Russia. They are recognised by clown masks from Russia or pandemic masks which they use in action. In 2021, it was designated by the Supreme Court of Russia as a terrorist organization.

== History ==
According to Mediazona, many unrelated neo-Nazi groups used the NS/WP abbreviation in the 2000s.

In 2010, two NS/WP members were charged with the murder of a 25-year-old Ghanaian citizen, Solomon Attengo Gwa-jio who was stabbed over 20 times on 25 December 2009 in Saint Petersburg.

In 2014, nine members of this organization, aged 17 to 24, were sentenced to 4–9 years in prison for a series of murders, attacks and robberies, as well as committing other crimes motivated by ethnic hatred. Members of the organization recorded one of the murders on camera and posted it on the Internet. In addition, they set fire to a car with two homeless people sleeping in it and carried out several more attacks on foreigners and people leading an asocial lifestyle, according to the prosecution. Members of the group were also found guilty of setting fire to a temple, a construction crane, and blowing up a public transport stop using a makeshift device. The last crime was regarded as a terrorist attack.

On 21 May 2021, the movement was recognized as a terrorist organization by the authorities of the Russian Federation and banned.

=== Claimed assassination attempt on Vladimir Solovyov ===
On 25 April 2022, Russia's Federal Security Service announced the arrest of a group of members of an organization that was making preparations to attempt the assassination of pro-government journalist Vladimir Solovyov. According to the FSB, the assassination was prepared by order of the Security Service of Ukraine. During the searches, the suspects were found and seized with an improvised explosive device, incendiary devices like Molotov cocktails, pistols, a sawed-off hunting rifle, a grenade, cartridges, drugs and forged Ukrainian passports. In addition, nationalist literature and paraphernalia were found. Among the detainees was also one of the leaders of NS/WP Andrey Pronsky, who in 2013, on behalf of NS/WP, committed the murder of a Jewish person, for which he was sent for compulsory treatment.

A day earlier, Russian President Putin announced that the FSB had stopped an attempted assassination of an unnamed Russian journalist.

In June, a sixth defendant was arrested in the case of plotting Solovyov's assassination. However, the legitimacy of this plot has been questioned.

=== Assassination of Iryna Farion ===
On 25 July 2024, the group published a video-manifesto of a "Ukrainian autonomous revolutionary racist" who committed the murder of the Ukrainian linguist and nationalist politician Iryna Farion, including the moment when she was shot. The manifesto claimed that the motive behind the murder was that Farion promoted language-based hatred among ethnic Ukrainians, undermining the racial aspect of the Ukrainian nation and thus being a "race traitor".

== See also ==
- Combat Terrorist Organization
- The Savior (paramilitary organization)
- Combat Organization of Russian Nationalists
- National Socialist Society
- Primorsky Partisans
