= Iryna Podoliak =

Ukrainian politician (born 1967)

- Ірина Подоляк
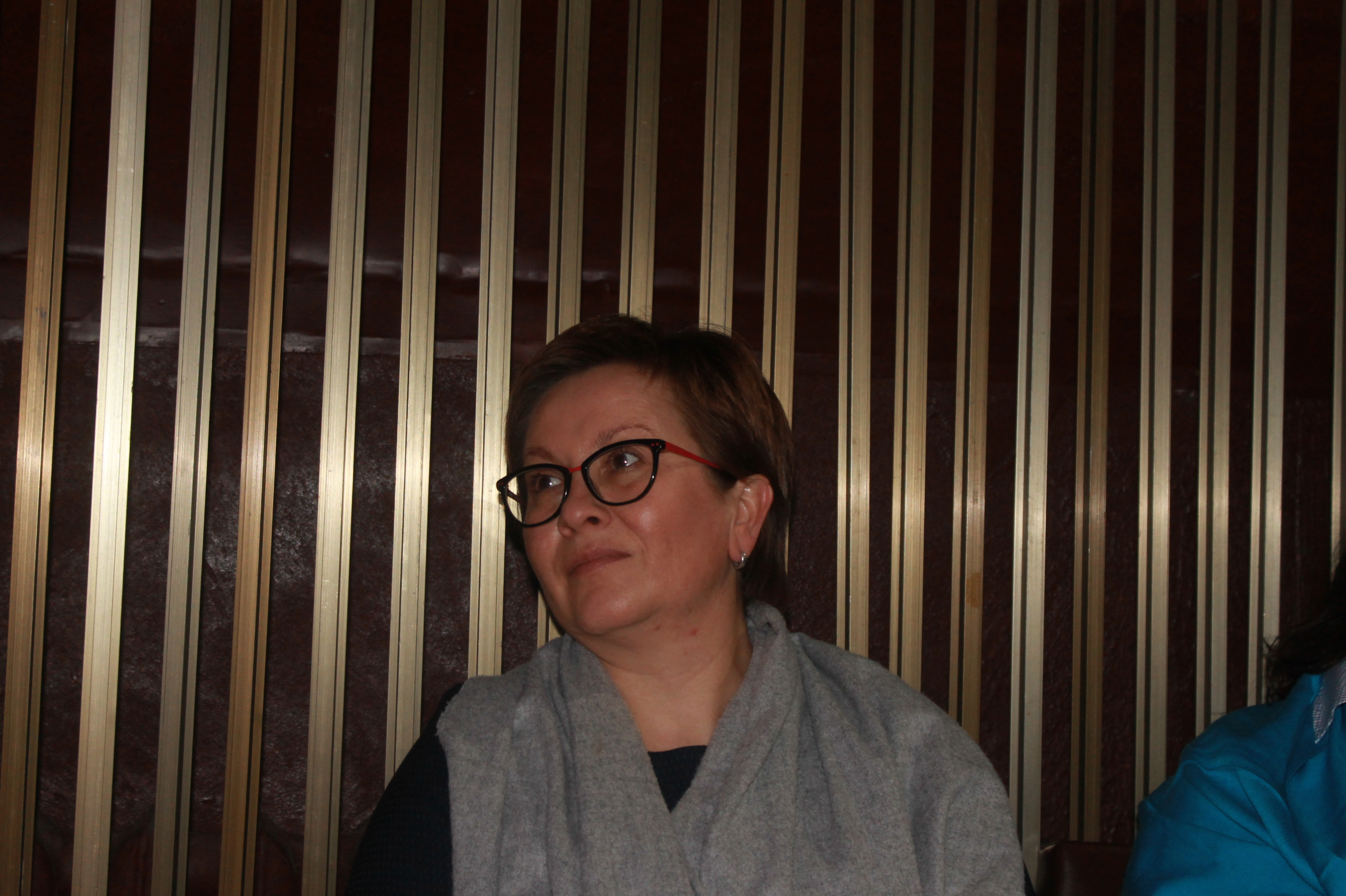

People's Deputy of Ukraine
- In office 27 November 2014 – 29 August 2019
- Preceded by: Iryna Farion
- Succeeded by: Mykola Kniazhytskyi
- Constituency: Lviv Oblast, No. 116

Personal details
- Born: 2 May 1967 (age 59) Zolochiv, Ukrainian SSR, Soviet Union (now Ukraine)
- Party: Self Reliance
- Education: Ivan Franko Lviv National University

Iryna Ihorivna Podoliak (Ukrainian: Іри́на І́горівна Подоля́к; born 2 May 1967) is a Ukrainian politician. She is a former people's deputy of Ukraine, representing Ukraine's 116th electoral district in the 8th Ukrainian Verkhovna Rada as a member of Self Reliance.

== Biography ==
Iryna Podoliak was born in Zolochiv, Lviv Oblast. She graduated with honours from Ivan Franko National University of Lviv, with a degree in Philology, Ukrainian Language and Literature. From 1990 to 1993 she attended the PhD program at the same university. In 2002 she received a degree in Law from the University of Lviv.

Podoliak started working in 1994, at the age of 17 taking the job of teacher in kindergarten #4 in Zolochiv. After obtaining her PhD degree, worked in the Creative Union Centre of Europe. In 1994–1998, worked in Lviv City Executive Committee, as a head of information department. In 1998–2002, she was the manager at the NGO Independent Culture Journal Ї. At the same time she was coordinating the USAID projects in Lviv. In 2002–2012 worked at the Lviv City Council, as the Head of International Cooperation department at the Bureau for Information Policies and External Relations.

In 2014 she was elected to Verkhovna Rada, the Parliament of Ukraine, defeating the incumbent MP for 116th electoral district, a linguist and a controversial public figure Iryna Farion. Podoliak received 41.2% of the vote, overturning a 51.1% majority.

In the July 2019 Ukrainian parliamentary election, Podoliak was not re-elected after finishing seventh with 5.1% of the vote in her district.

Podoliak has a daughter, student of the University of Lviv.
