= Murder of Iryna Farion =

Assassination of Ukrainian politician

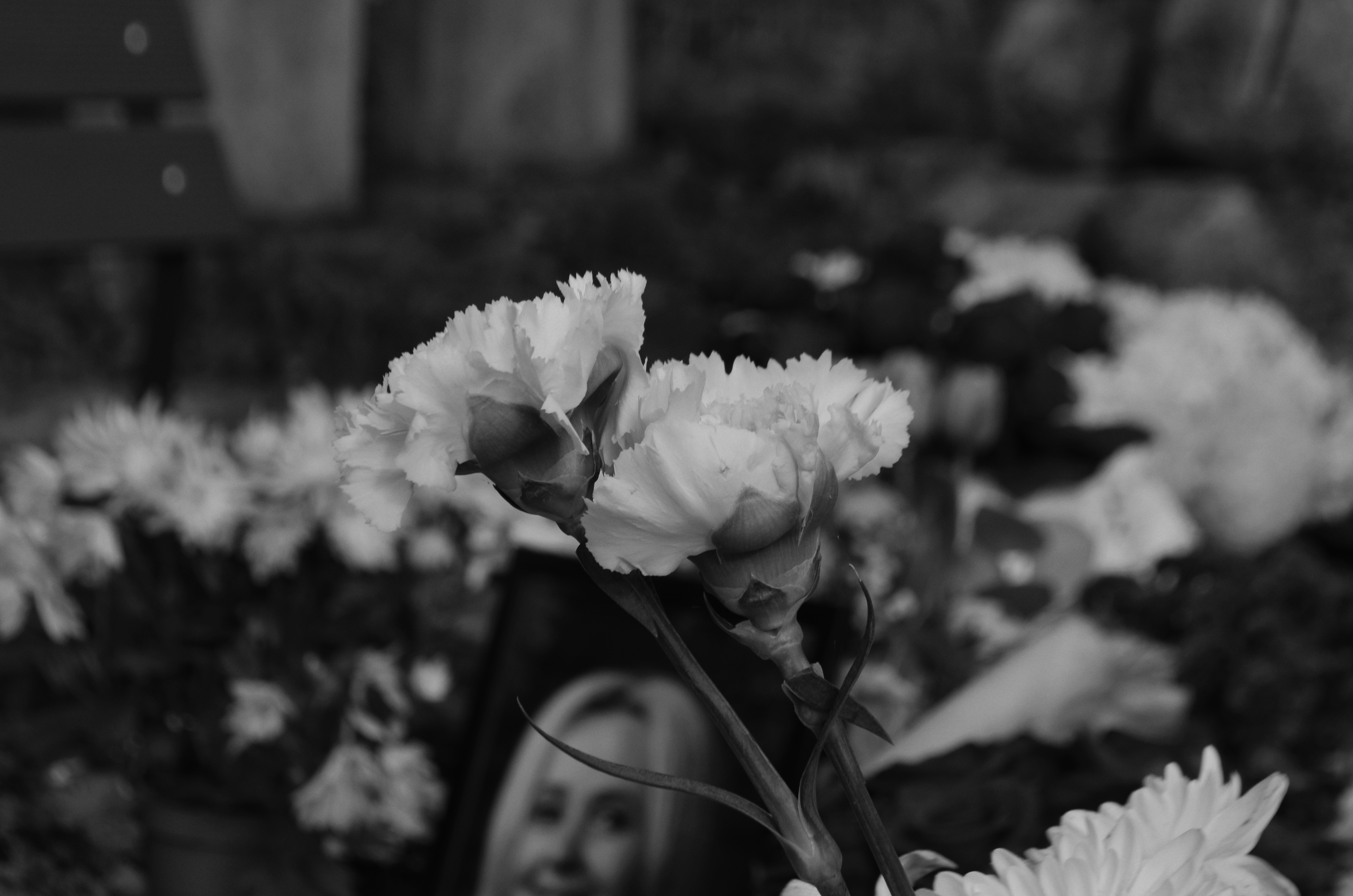
- Memorial after the assassination.
- Location: Lviv, Ukraine
- Date: 19 July 2024; 2 years ago 19:30 EEST (UTC+3)
- Target: Iryna Farion
- Attack type: Assassination by shooting; domestic terrorism
- Deaths: 1 (the target)
- Perpetrator: Viacheslav Zinchenko

Iryna Farion, a Ukrainian linguist, former lawmaker and nationalist politician who served as a deputy in the Verkhovna Rada from 2012 to 2014 for Svoboda, was assassinated outside her home in Lviv, Ukraine, on 19 July 2024. She was 60 years old. Authorities arrested 18-year-old Viacheslav Zinchenko in Dnipro, nearly 1,000 km from Lviv. He had rented at least three apartments in Lviv, allegedly preparing for the crime. Zinchenko was subsequently found guilty and sentenced to life in prison.

== Assassination and perpetrator ==
In early July 2024, Viacheslav Zinchenko, an 18-year-old from Dnipro, allegedly traveled by intercity bus to Lviv. Upon arriving in Lviv, he is believed to have rented at least three different apartments across the city under false identities, allegedly to reduce suspicion and facilitate movement without detection.

During the weeks leading up to the attack, Zinchenko allegedly purchased disguises, including sunglasses, a panama hat, a fake beard, gloves, and dark clothing. He reportedly carried pepper powder with him, possibly intended to obscure his scent and hinder tracking dogs following the assassination.

Between approximately 16 and 18 July 2024, Zinchenko was seen conducting surveillance near areas frequently visited by Iryna Farion, including her residence and locations where she typically hailed taxis. Witnesses reported seeing an unfamiliar individual loitering along Masaryk Street during the evenings prior to the shooting.

On 19 July 2024, around 19:30 local time, Farion was waiting for a taxi on Tomáš Masaryk Street in Lviv when Zinchenko allegedly approached her and shot her in the temple at close range with a sports-bullet pistol, possibly a converted weapon. He subsequently fled on foot, discarding various items of clothing, disguises, and other evidence into separate trash containers throughout the city. Law enforcement later recovered a fake beard, sunglasses, hat, clothing items, pepper powder packets, and a shell casing from the area. Following the assassination, Zinchenko allegedly left Lviv again by bus. He traveled back to Dnipro, where he went into hiding.

On 24 July 2024, the Russian group National Socialism / White Power published a manifesto of the individual who committed the murder of Farion, including a video alleged to be depicting the moment she was shot. The manifesto claimed that the motive behind the murder was that Farion promoted language-based hatred among ethnic Ukrainians, undermining the racial aspect of the Ukrainian nation and thus being a "racial traitor".

Ukrainian authorities arrested Zinchenko in Dnipro on 25 July 2024 after tracing his movements through bus passenger lists, CCTV footage, and mobile phone data. Zinchenko has reportedly denied involvement in the killing, though investigators have matched DNA traces and other evidence linking him to the crime scene.

== Trial ==
Following his arrest on 25 July 2024, Viacheslav Zinchenko was charged with premeditated murder under Article 115 of the Criminal Code of Ukraine. Initially held in pre-trial detention for two months, his detention was subsequently extended several times as the investigation progressed. Prosecutors later revised the charges to intentional murder committed out of national intolerance, coupled with illegal possession of weapons.

The trial began in the Shevchenkivskyi District Court of Lviv in July 2025. During initial hearings, Zinchenko pleaded not guilty and denied direct involvement in the shooting. His defense requested additional security measures and more time to examine evidence, arguing that Zinchenko may have been manipulated or framed by unknown parties.

Farion's family has filed a civil claim seeking ₴15 million in moral damages, which they have announced would be donated entirely to Ukraine's Defense Forces if awarded. Prosecutors have presented evidence including CCTV footage, DNA traces, and items recovered from Lviv linked to Zinchenko.

During a 22 August hearing, the court heard a recorded conversation between Zinchenko and another inmate, where Zinchenko attributed his motive for killing Farion to her negative comments on Russian-speaking Ukrainians. In court, Zinchenko stated that his remarks were untruthful, made to avoid the pressure of being questioned.

Zinchenko was sentenced to life imprisonment on 1 October 2026 and ordered to pay five million hryvnias to Farion's daughter. The court's analysis included physical and electronic evidence; however, the exact pistol used for the killing was not determined.

== See also ==
- Murder of Jo Cox
- Assassination of Andriy Parubiy
