= Ukraine's 116th electoral district =

Verkhovna Rada constituency in Lviv Oblast

- Electoral district for the Verkhovna Rada
- Region: Lviv
- Electorate: 170,998 (2019)
- Major settlements: Zaliznychnyi District, Shevchenkivskyi District (part)

Current Electoral district
- Created: 2012
- Number of members: Single People’s Deputy
Party
European Solidarity
- Member: Mykola Kniazhytskyi

Ukraine's 116th electoral district is an electoral district in Lviv Oblast. Established in its current form in 2012, it comprises the Zaliznychnyi District and part of the Shevchenkivskyi District of the city of Lviv, covering the western and north-western parts of the city. The district borders districts 122 to the west, north-west and north, district 118 to the north-east, south and south-west, and district 117 to the east.

The district contains 81 polling stations and had 170,998 registered voters as of 2019.

Between 2012 and 2014, the electoral district was represented by Iryna Farion of the far-right Svoboda party, a linguist and a controversial public figure.

== People's Deputies ==
Election	Party	Portrait	Member
2012	Svoboda		Iryna Farion
2014	Self Reliance		Iryna Podoliak
2019	European Solidarity		Mykola Kniazhytskyi

== Elections ==
=== 2019 ===
In the 2019 parliamentary election, the district changed hands again. Despite the Holos party, led by musician Sviatoslav Vakarchuk winning the nationwide proportional representation vote in the district with 29.5% of the vote, which was the party's second-highest result among all electoral districts in Ukraine, Mykola Kniazhytskyi of European Solidarity won the single-mandate vote, receiving 23.0% of the vote with the Holos party candidate coming close second.

The incumbent MP Iryna Podoliak failed to secure re-election, finishing seventh with 5.0% of the vote. The former MP Iryna Farion, who had previously represented the district from 2012 to 2014, finished fifth with 10.0%.

2019 Ukrainian parliamentary election
Party	Candidate	Votes	%	±%
European Solidarity	Mykola Kniazhytskyi	20,089	23.1	New
Holos	Marta Romaniak	17,511	20.1	New
Servant of the People	Rostyslav Melnyk	11,439	13.1	New
Civil Position	Valeriy Veremchuk	9,899	11.4	New
Svoboda	Iryna Farion	9,022	10.4	▼6.0
Independent	Ihor Zinkevych	6,680	7.7	New
Self Reliance	Iryna Podoliak	4,417	5.1	▼36.1
Independent	Volodymyr Domanskyi	2,979	3.4	New
Batkivshchyna	Nataliya Tymchiy	2,264	2.6	▼1.5
SiCh	Vasyl Popovych	1,477	1.7	New
Others		1,363	1.6	N/A
Total votes		87,140	100.0	
Rejected ballots		2,113	3.4	▲1.1
Turnout		89,253	52.2	▼15.7
Registered electors		170,864		
European Solidarity gain from Self Reliance				

=== 2014 ===
In 2014, the election was won comfortably by Iryna Podoliak of the Self Reliance party, with the result representing a significant 46.4 percentage-point swing. Iryna Farion failed to retain the district, finishing third. After losing her seat, the former MP made controversial remarks regarding the voters who supported her opponents.

In the nationwide proportional representation vote held in the district, Svoboda finished fourth with 6.3% of the vote.

2014 Ukrainian parliamentary election
Party	Candidate	Votes	%	±%
Self Reliance	Iryna Podoliak	47,285	41.2	New
Radical Party	Valeriy Veremchuk	20,559	17.9	New
Svoboda	Iryna Farion	18,775	16.4	▼51.6
Independent	Volodymyr Malinovskyi	7,390	6.4	New
Batkivshchyna	Volodymyr Overko	4,668	4.1	New
Zastup	Andriy Bereziuk	3,854	3.4	New
Independent	Oleh Radyk	2,427	2.1	New
Independent	Oleh Nesimko	1,775	1.5	New
KPU	Iryna Drobot	1,611	1.4	▼1.5
Opposition Bloc	Andriy Tsvyk	1,438	1.3	New
Others		4,987	4.3	N/A
Total votes		114,769	100.0	
Rejected ballots		3,993	3.4	▲1.1
Turnout		118,762	67.9	▲1.4
Registered electors		174,830		
Self Reliance gain from Svoboda		Swing	▲46.4	

=== 2012 ===
Iryna Farion of the Svoboda party won the district in a landslide, receiving 68.0% of the vote. This was the highest result achieved by a Svoboda candidate in a single-member district nationwide in that election.

In the nationwide proportional representation vote, Svoboda received 41.7% of the vote in the district, the party's second-highest result among all electoral districts in Ukraine.

2012 Ukrainian parliamentary election
Party	Candidate	Votes	%
Svoboda	Iryna Farion	77,631	68.0
UDAR	Andriy Bereziuk	19,251	16.9
Party of Regions	Bohdan Khrustavchuk	5,093	4.5
Independent	Vasyl Sadovyi	4,553	4.0
KPU	Ihor Niekrasov	3,269	2.9
Republican Platform	Stepan Sereda	1,769	1.6
Ukraine – Forward!	Ihor Herchuk	1,364	1.2
Others		1,194	1.0
Majority		58,380	51.1
Total votes		114,124	100.0
Rejected ballots		2,725	2.3
Turnout		116,849	66.5
Registered electors		175,635	
Svoboda win (new seat)			
