= Sniper: The White Raven =

2022 Ukrainian film

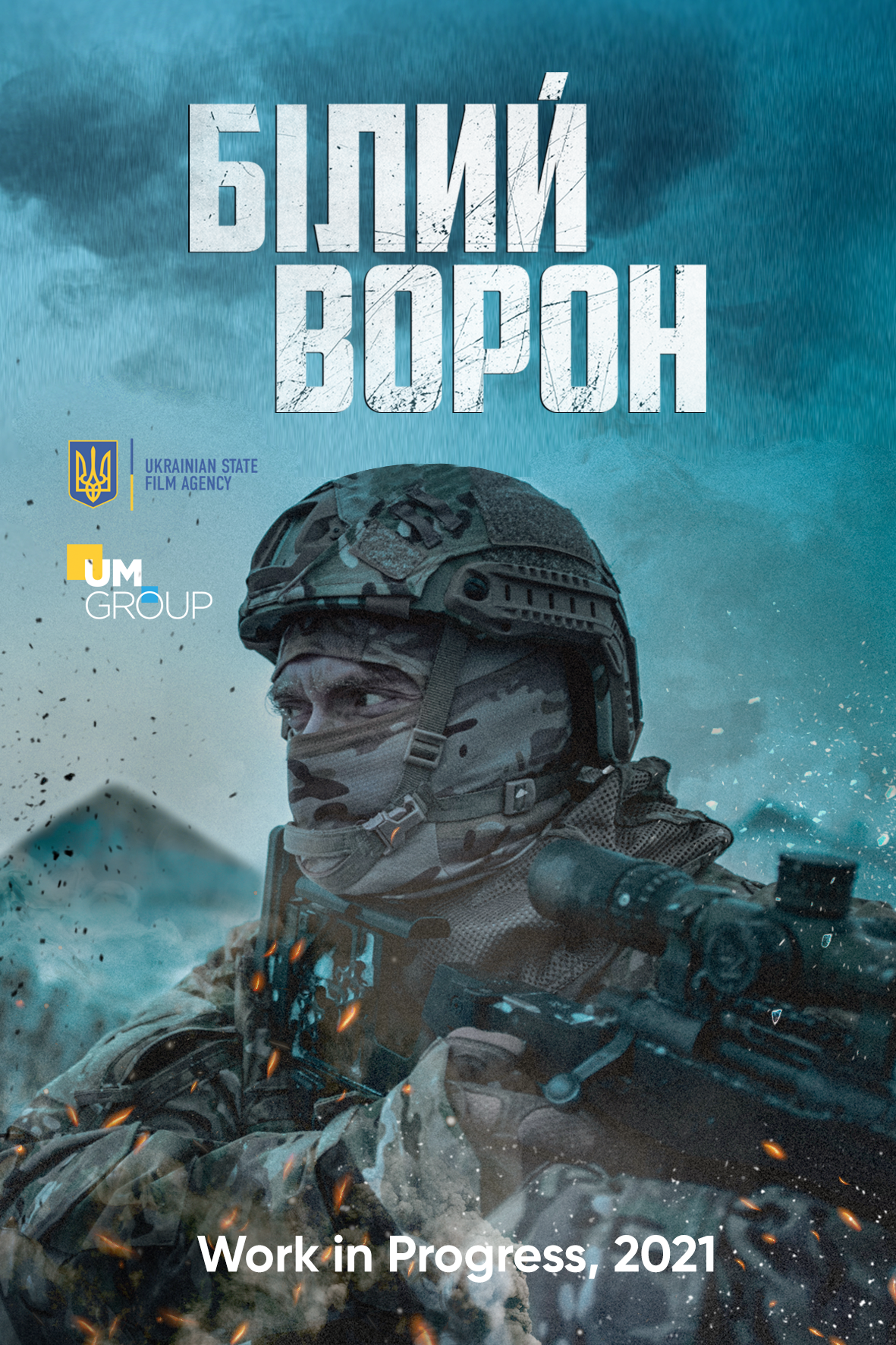
- Ukrainian: Снайпер. Білий ворон
- Directed by: Maryan Bushan
- Written by: Maryan Bushan; Mykola Voronin
- Starring: Oleg Drach; Maryna Koshkina; Andriy Mostrenko; Roman Yasinovskyi; Pavlo Aldoshyn; Oleg Shulga
- Cinematography: Konstantin Ponomarev
- Edited by: Elena Semenchuk
- Music by: Nadiia Odesiuk
- Production company: UM-Group
- Distributed by: Well Go USA Entertainment (USA)
- Release date: 6 May 2022 (Global)
- Running time: 112 minutes
- Country: Ukraine
- Language: Ukrainian

Sniper: The White Raven (Ukrainian: «Снайпер. Білий ворон», romanized: Snaiper. Bilyi voron) is a 2022 Ukrainian full-length feature film from UM-Group. Work on the film began in 2019. The war drama won the 11th competition of the Ukrainian State Film Agency, and the film was awarded ₴23,946,572 (80% of the total cost of the film's production). The film is directed by Maryan Bushan and written by Maryan Bushan and Mykola Voronin.

The film tells the story of a pacifist high school teacher, who wanted to live in peace and harmony with nature, but was driven to join the Ukrainian military as a sniper after war comes to the Donbas. The story was inspired by the life and experiences of scriptwriter Mykola Voronin, himself a schoolteacher who later enlisted with the military.

Filming took place in the fall of 2020 at the International Center of NSU in Kyivshchyna (Kyiv Oblast), prior to Russia's full-scale invasion of Ukraine. Military personnel and military equipment of the International Center and the Northern Operational Territorial Unit of the National Guard of Ukraine, as well as the Rapid Response Brigade of the National Guard of Ukraine took part in the filming. About a hundred guardsmen and about two dozen pieces of equipment took part in the mass scenes.

== Plot ==
Mykola Voronenko (Pavlo Aldoshyn), a pacifist, hippie high school physics teacher, lives an idyllic, off-grid life along with his pregnant wife Nastya (Maryna Koshkina). Without a connection to the outside world, they are caught by surprise when Russian soldiers cross the Ukrainian border and occupy their hometown of Horlivka. A pair of soldiers attack their home, burning it and killing Nastya when she tries to resist.

Mykola is found by a group of poorly trained civilian partisans, led by a military brigadier (Roman Semysal) who trains the ragtag group for military service. Initially struggling, he volunteers for specialist sniper training, demonstrating his capability through a timed field strip. Even in the specialized course, he is not taken seriously, and given inferior equipment. However, his knowledge of physics allows him to excel in range-finding, and he passes the final exam of the course with the best marks of his class.

Now a real sniper, he is code-named "Raven" (Voron) due to his last name, and assigned to back-up an assault on a Russian bridge checkpoint. A car with two civilian refugees attempts to cross at the checkpoint during the attack, and when a Russian soldier takes a woman hostage, Mykola takes a risky shot to save her. Back at base, he has his first intimate experience with death after one of his close friends and classmates is killed during a mission by a counter-sniper, designated Seryy. During his next mission, he is assigned to ambush a Russian patrol at extremely close range, and is forced to kill a former student.

Seryy is warned by his superiors that Mykola and his spotter are operating in the area. While observing an enemy position, Mykola recognizes the pair of soldiers that killed his wife, and opens fire without permission, killing one. This betrays their position to Seryy, who kills his spotter and calls artillery on him. After retreating back to base, his commander gives him special orders to hunt down enemy snipers.

Mykola, now a professional, kills an inexperienced sniper duo with a new silenced rifle. At a debriefing, his commander announces that he will lead a special operation to kill Seryy, who is encamped in an old chemical factory with a detachment of soldiers and two other snipers, and cannot be bombed due to the risk of environmental catastrophe. While infiltrating, Mykola finds and kills the second of the two Russians that killed his wife.

His commander lays down covering fire on the factory, distracting Seryy as the other members of the squad take out the regular soldiers. Mykola infiltrates alone and shoots one of the two snipers, alerting Seryy, who calls reinforcements. Mykola ambushes Seryy and kills him with a knife, while the second sniper is killed by an improvised trap. When the reinforcements arrive, instead of retreating, Mykola decides to ambush and eliminate them. After narrowly surviving and completing the mission, he returns to his destroyed home, he contemplates knowing now that a happy future and peaceful life with his family is no more, now denied by the Russians, he goes to the grave, saying a final goodbye to his wife before returning to the battlefield.

== Cast ==
- Pavlo Aldoshyn – Mykola (White Raven)
- Maryna Koshkina – Nastya
- Roman Semysal – Brigade commander
- Andriy Mostrenko – Cap
- Oleg Drach – Syeryy
- Roman Yasinovskyi – Klim
- Vadym Lyalko – Commander of the GRU
- Oleg Shulga – Danube
- Petro Nedzelsky – Commander in the headquarters

== Critical reception ==
On the review aggregator website Rotten Tomatoes, the film has an approval rating of 78% based on 18 professional reviews.
