= Pushkin State Russian Drama Theatre =

Coordinates: 37.5705°N 58.2122°E

Ashgabat Russian Drama Theatre named after Pushkin
- A. S. Puşkin adyndaky döwlet rus drama teatry

General information
- Type: Drama theatre
- Location: Ashgabat, Turkmenistan
- Completed: 1926

The State Russian Drama Theatre named after Pushkin or Pushkin Theatre (Turkmen: A. S. Puşkin adyndaky döwlet rus drama teatry) is a theatre in Ashgabat, the capital city of Turkmenistan.

== History ==
The theatre was founded in 1926. The artistic director from 1929-30 was Alexander Skibnevsky. In 1937, the theatre was named after the Russian poet Alexander Pushkin. In February 2004, building on the Görogly street was demolished, because of its state of emergency. The theatre was moved to Magyumguly avenue, to the building of the former Palace of Culture of the Ashgabat Silk Factory.

== Links ==
- "Гибель актёра Чары Ишанкулиева". Эркин Туркменистан. 2005-11-13. Archived from the original on 2014-09-10. "Чары Ишанкулиев был главным режиссёром Русского драматического театра имени А.С. Пушкина"
