= Rymma Zyubina =

Ukrainian actress and TV presenter

Rimma Zyubina
- Римма Зюбіна
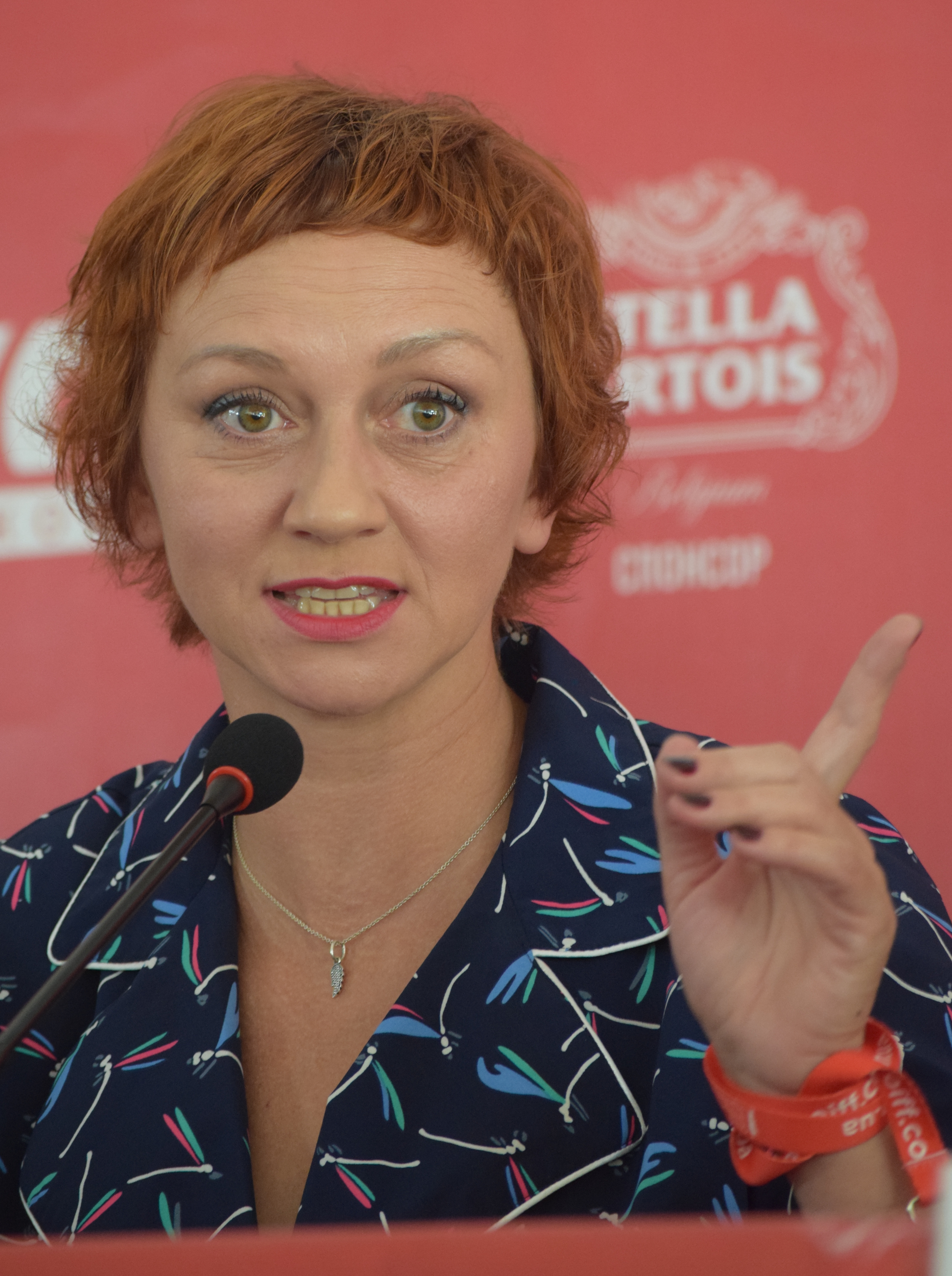
- Rimma Zyubina in 2016
- Born: Rimma Zyubina; August 23, 1971 (age 54); Uzhhorod, Zakarpattia Oblast, Ukrainian SSR, Soviet Union

Rimma Anatolyevna Zyubina (Ukrainian: Римма Анатоліївна Зюбіна; born August 23, 1971, Uzhhorod) is a Ukrainian theater and film actress, TV presenter, public figure. Recognized as the best actress in 2017-2019 by the “Shot in Ukraine” rating. Winner of numerous theatrical awards, including the two-time winner of the Kyiv Pectoral Prize, as well as several international awards.

== Biography ==
Rimma Zyubina was born in Uzhhorod in Transcarpathia. From three to seven years she lived in Hungary due to the fact that her father was a military man. It was in Hungary, having seen the play "Cinderella", where her sister played the main role, that a child's dream was born to become an actress. From childhood, she studied ballet, studied at a music school, and also took part in the children's theater "Rovesnik", a studio theater at the Transcarpathian Drama Theater, where she played in performances in crowd scenes from the age of 17. She graduated with honors from the Uzhhorod Cultural and Educational School, after which she was invited to work in several theaters, but she chooses the Kyiv National University of Culture and Arts. After a year of study, he returns to Uzhhorod and gets a job at the local drama theater.

== Career ==
After some time, she again moved to Kyiv, where she worked in several theaters at once: in the professional Theater-Studio of the Chamber Play, in the Youth Theater, in the Drama and Comedy Theater on the left bank of the Dnieper, in the Golden Gate Theater and in the Constellation Theater. In 1992, she made her television debut in the film About Mad Love, a Sniper and an Astronaut. Since 1992 she has been the host of the Eniki-Beniki program and since 1994 Lego Express for the children's edition of the First National Channel of Ukraine.

In 1994 she graduated from the Kyiv Institute of Culture. Korneichuk (now it is the Kyiv National University of Culture and Arts), at the same time he began working at the Bravo Theater. Since 1997 - member of the troupe of the Kyiv Academic Young Theatre. Over the years of work in the theater, the actress has repeatedly performed with performances at international theater festivals.

She became the founder of the children's film festival "FilmFestBook" in the Artek-Bukovel camp in 2016 and 2017.

In 2016, she starred in the film "The Dove's Nest". The picture became a triumphant award "Gold Jiga", where it received six statuettes, including Rimma Zyubina was awarded the title of "Best Actress". In 2017, she entered the list of the most influential women in Ukraine.

== Private life ==
Married to Ukrainian theater director Stanislav Moiseev, in 1998 they had a son.

== Public life ==
She is the Ambassador of the Crab Foundation for Helping Children with Cancer. Also, on a volunteer basis, she plays performances as part of the troupe of the Luhansk Music and Drama Theater, which temporarily moved to Severodonetsk.

The actress has repeatedly refused the title of "Honored Artist of Ukraine", since, in her opinion, this is a relic of the Soviet past, and the artist also actively supports the reformation of the current theatrical system in the country.

In March 2014, after the annexation of Crimea, Rimma Zyubina became the first Ukrainian actress who officially announced her refusal to act in Russian production projects. She actively fought for the release of Ukrainian film director Oleg Sentsov from a Russian prison. Organized the campaign “Plant trees, not people”, which was supported in many countries of the world. She is a regular participant in actions to support Ukrainian political prisoners who have been illegally convicted and are being held in Russian prisons.

== Awards ==
=== Ukraine State Awards ===
- Order of Princess Olga III degree (2020)

=== Awards ===
- 1992 - International Festival of Theaters for Children and YouthBest Actress (“Magic Little Little Girls”)
- 1994 - Festival of Kyiv professional studio theatersBest Actress (It's Cold Backstage)
- 2003 - "Kyiv Pectoral"Best Actress ("Uncle Vanya")
- 2008 - "Kyiv Pectoral"Best Actress (“The Fourth Sister”)
- 2008 - International Festival "Theater. Chekhov. YaltaBest Female Performance in a Chekhov production ("Uncle Vanya")
- 2016 — KiTi Film FestivalBest Actress (Echo)
- 2016 - International Film Festival Mannheim - HeidelbergSpecial Achievement Award ("The Dove's Nest")
- 2017 - State Prize. Lesya Ukrainka ("Trumpeter")
- 2017 - "Golden Jiga"Best Actress ("The Dove's Nest")
- 2017 - International Film Festival "Love is Madness" Bulgaria, VarnaBest Actress ("The Dove's Nest")
- 2022 - Only The Best Film Awards, Miami, USA. Best Actress. Film "Valera"
