= Moscow Metallurgical Plant =

1883–2011 industrial enterprise in Moscow, Russia

Coordinates: 55°45′01″N 37°41′22″E

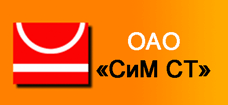
- Company type: Open joint-stock company
- Founded: 1883
- Defunct: 2011
- Headquarters: Moscow, Russia
- Website: sim-st.com

Moscow Metallurgical Plant (Russian: Серп и Молот, romanized: Serp i Molot, lit. 'sickle and hammer') in Moscow, Russia was founded in 1883 as a metallurgic workshop and became known as the Goujon (or Guzhon) Plant (завод Гужона). It is one of the oldest major industrial enterprises in the middle Russia. In the Soviet era it was renamed after the Communist "Hammer and sickle" symbol. In 2011 the plant was decommissioned.

The major markets are Russia (85%), Belarus (12%), and Ukraine (1%) Non-CIS market is within 1-2%.

== History ==
From 1883 to 1917, the plant was known as the Association of the Moscow Metallic Plant (Guzhon Plant) - Товарищество Московского металлического завода (завода Гужона). From July, 1917 to November, 1922: Московский Государственный металлический завод No.9, Moscow State Metallic Plant #9. From 1922 to 1992: Московский металлургический завод "Серп и молот", Moscow Metallurgical Plant Serp i Molot. From November 25, 1992 to 1997: Акционерное общество 'Московский металлургический завод "Серп и молот"', Joint-stock company "Moscow Metallurgical Plant Serp i Molot". From July 17, 1997 onwards: Открытое акционерное общество 'Московский металлургический завод "Серп и молот"', Open joint-stock company 'Moscow Metallurgical Plant Serp i Molot ' (ОАО "СиМ СТ", OAO "SIM ST").

In April 2011 the plant stopped operating. In 2014 a plan to redevelop the territory of the plant for housing was approved. In March 2015 the housing construction started

== Ownership and management ==
Directors:

- June 1938 - May 1958 — Ilyin Grigory Markelovich
- November 1960 - November 1972 — Ermolaev Vladimir Alekseevich
- 1966-2012 (December 26) — Parenkov Sergey Leonidovich
- Chairman of the Board of Directors: Lev Sadovsky (Садовский Лев Николаевич, b. 1939)

Real estate: 871,625,538 rubles

Nominal capital: 1,532,422,528 rubles

=== Major stockholders ===
The company does not have the "golden share" (rights of federal subjects to manage the business). Moscow City has a considerable share of stock of the plant.

Below, the percentages indicate both the shares held and the nominal capital.

- Открытое акционерное общество "МЕТА - ИНВЕСТ", 33.3%
- Акционерный коммерческий "Московский муниципальный банк – Банк Москвы", 37%
- Банк Москвы (Департамент имущества города Москвы) – 16,84%

== Subsidiaries ==
- Закрытое акционерное общество "Производственно-строительный монтажный трест "Серп и молот"
- Общество с ограниченной ответственностью "СиМ-Инвест"
- Закрытое Акционерное Общество Таможенно – брокерский комплекс "Гужон"

== See also ==
- Severstal
