= Ostap Drozdov =

Ukrainian book author and journalist

Ostap Petrovych Drozdov
- Остап Петрович Дроздов
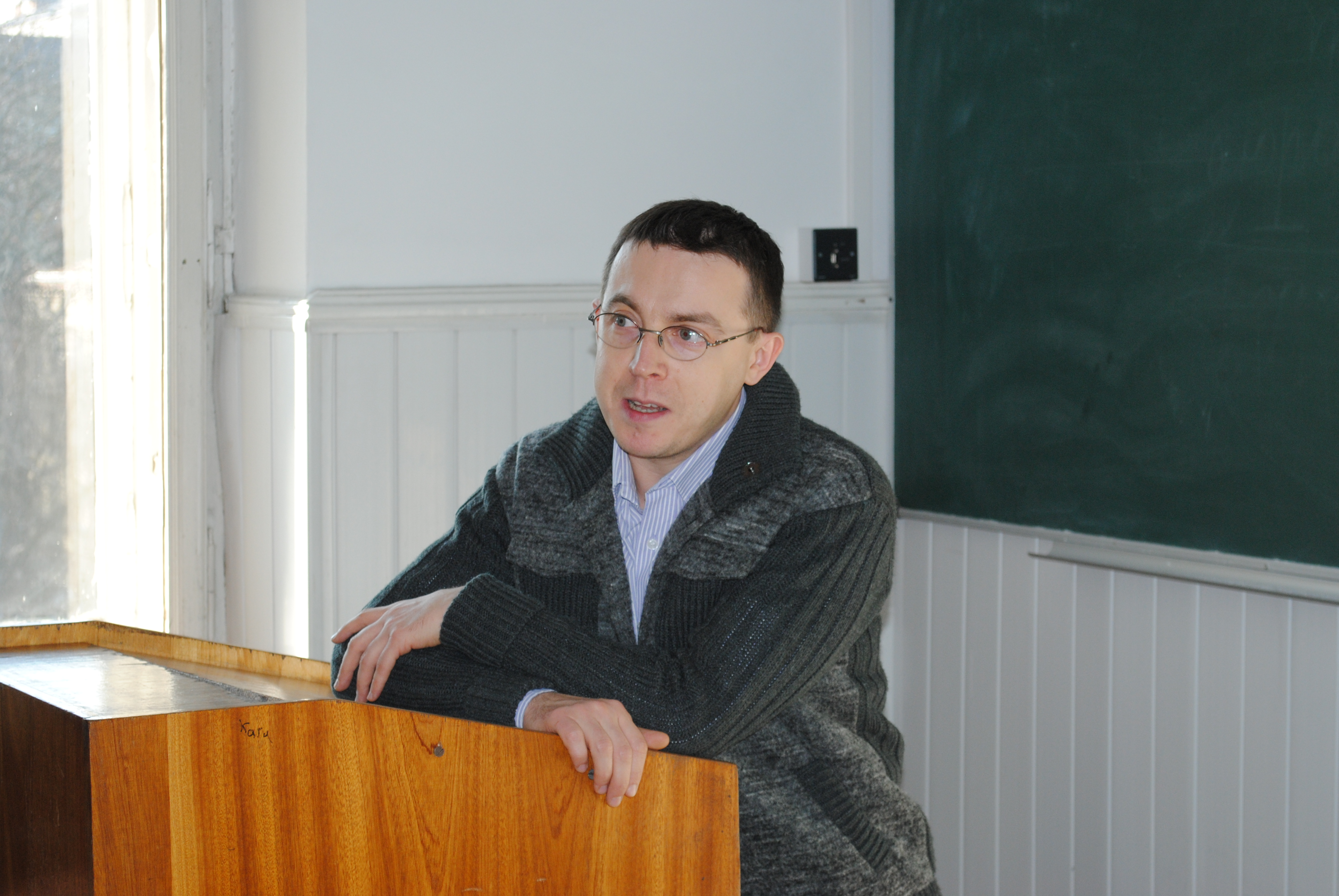
- Drozdov in 2014
- Born: 24 January 1979 (age 47); Lviv
- Education: Lviv University
- Occupations: Journalist, author
- Years active: 2007—
- Television: "Pryamym Tekstom", "Drozdov”

Ostap Petrovych Drozdov (born 24 January 1979, in Lviv) is a Ukrainian author and journalist. He is the host of the program "Drozdov" and the political talk show "Pryamim tekstom" and the author of two books.

Drozdov is a well-known and radical opponent of the Russian language in Ukraine and is a sharp critic of the Ukrainian authorities, primarily the President Volodymyr Zelenskyy.

== Biography ==
He spent his childhood in Mykolayiv. His mother was a teacher in a music school, and his father left him when Drozdov was four years old. He finished music school with flute and piano.

In 2001, Drozdov graduated with honors from the Faculty of Journalism of Lviv University. He worked as a correspondent for various newspapers at the time.

== Political career ==
In 2007 Drozdov became the author and host of the political program "Pryamim textom" on the ZIK TV channel, where more than a thousand broadcasts with politicians of all levels were conducted. Later in 2014 he also started the hard talk show "Drozdov" on the same channel, where the guests were the main Ukrainian newsmakers of the week. After the acquisition of the channel by Taras Kozak, who is close to the pro-Russian politician Viktor Medvedchuk, Drozdov left ZIK and terminated both of his programs in 2019.

On 25 June 2014, during the war in eastern Ukraine, Drozdov spoke in support of the "Mobilization = Genocide" initiative and called on Ukrainians to unite against mobilization into the ranks of the Ukrainian army.

Since September 2019, he hosts the program "Drozdov pryamym tekstom", which is broadcast on the NTA TV channel and his DROZDOV YouTube channel.

== Works ==
- Остап Дроздов. № 1. Роман-вибух. — Kyiv, Anetty Antonenko publishing, 2016. — 256 pages — ISBN 978-617-719-252-6
- Остап Дроздов. № 2. — Kyiv, Anetty Antonenko publishing, 2017. — 288 pages — ISBN 978-617-719-273-1
