= Iryna Vereshchuk =

Ukrainian activist and politician

- Ірина Верещук
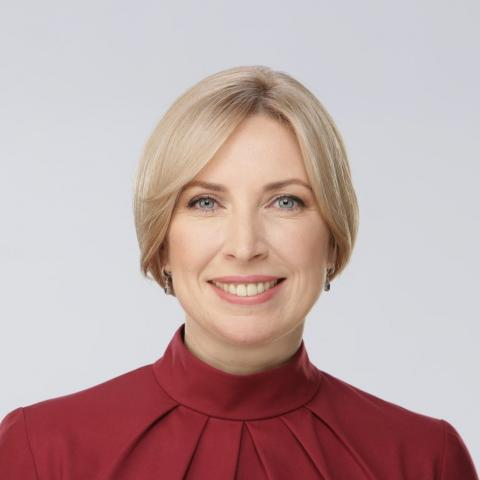
- Portrait, 2021

Deputy Prime Minister of Ukraine Minister of Reintegration of Temporarily Occupied Territories
- In office 4 November 2021 – 8 September 2024
- President: Volodymyr Zelenskyy
- Prime Minister: Denys Shmyhal
- Preceded by: Oleksii Reznikov
- Succeeded by: Oleksiy Chernyshov

People's Deputy of Ukraine
- In office 29 August 2019 – 4 November 2021

Personal details
- Born: 30 November 1979 (age 46) Rava-Ruska, Ukrainian SSR, Soviet Union
- Party: Servant of the People
- Education: Lviv Polytechnic

Military service
- Allegiance: Ukraine
- Branch/service: Ukrainian Ground Forces
- Years of service: 1997–2002
- Rank: Senior lieutenant

Iryna Andriivna Vereshchuk (Ukrainian: Ірина Андріївна Верещук, IPA: [iˈrɪnɐ ɐnˈd⁽ʲ⁾r⁽ʲ⁾ijiu̯nɐ wereˈʃtʃuk]; born 30 November 1979) is a Ukrainian social activist, politician, and former People's Deputy of Ukraine of the 9th convocation. On 4 November 2021, Vereshchuk was appointed Deputy Prime Minister of Ukraine and Minister of Reintegration of Temporarily Occupied Territories. On 8 September 2024 she was appointed deputy head of Office of the President of Ukraine subjugated to Andriy Yermak.

== Early life and education ==
Vereshchuk was born on 30 November 1979 in Rava-Ruska, Nesterovskyi (later Zhovkva) Raion, Lviv Oblast. In 1997 she finished Rava-Ruska secondary school with honour (Gold Medal). From 1997 to 2002, she studied at the Military Institute at Lviv Polytechnic, which she graduated from with a speciality of "International Information". From 2002 to 2006, she studied at the Law Faculty of the University of Lviv, where she majored in law. From 2008 to 2010, Vereshchuk studied at Lviv Region Institute of State Administration of the National Academy for Public Administration under the President of Ukraine. In accordance with her academic results, in summer of 2009 she underwent an internship at the Cabinet Office of Ukraine, and then was added to the employee pool of Ukraine's Cabinet. In 2011, she became a postgraduate student at the Lviv Region Institute of State Administration of the National Academy for Public Administration under the President of Ukraine. On 11 November 2015, she defended a thesis on the topic: "Organizational and Legal Mechanism for Improving the Administrative and Territorial Structure of Ukraine" (using reforms conducted by Poland as an example) and received a degree of Candidate of Science in State Management.

== Career ==
After graduating from Military School, Vereshchuk served as an officer in the Ukrainian Army for five years. From May 2007 to June 2008, she worked as a lawyer at Rava-Ruska City Council.

From June to October 2010, she was deputy head of Zhovkva Region State Administration on humanitarian issues and foreign policy.

She was elected mayor of Rava-Ruska on 30 October 2010. At the time she was the youngest female mayor in Ukraine. She governed the city for five years.

Vereshchuk was a candidate in the 2014 Ukrainian parliamentary election. As an independent candidate she gained 4.46% of the votes (6th place) in Ukraine's 122nd electoral district (centred in Yavoriv) and lost the election to Volodymyr Parasyuk (who won with 56.56% of the votes).

On 17 February 2015, she left her post as mayor of Rava-Ruska due to what she called constant pressure from "pseudopatriots".

During 2015 and 2016, Vereshchuk studied in Poland under the Kirkland program, she researched Poland's experience of decentralization.

In April 2016, Vereshchuk became President of the International Center for Baltic and Black Sea Studies and Consensus Practices. She headed it until 2019.

Since September 2017, she is a PhD (docent) of the Department of Political Sciences of the National Pedagogical Drahomanov University.

In 2019, Vereshchuk was elected a People's Deputy of Ukraine in the 2019 Ukrainian parliamentary election for Servant of the People as number 29 on its election list. In parliament she became Chairperson of the Sub-committee on National Security and Defense of the Verkhovna Rada Committee on National Security, Defense and Intelligence. From 4 September to 15 November 2019, she was a representative of the government at the Verkhovna Rada (Ukraine's parliament). She relinquished these duties in November 2019.

Vereshchuk was the candidate of Servant of the People for the post of Mayor of Kyiv in the 2020 Kyiv local election set for 25 October 2020. The Kyiv City Territorial Election Commission announced on 6 November that in the election she had received 39,321 votes, securing fifth place and losing the election to incumbent mayor Klitschko who was re-elected in the first round of the election with 50.52% of the votes, 365,161 people had voted for him.

On 4 November 2021, Vereshchuk was appointed Deputy Prime Minister of Ukraine and Minister for Reintegration of Temporary Occupied Territories in the Shmyhal Government.

On 8 September 2024 Vereshchuk was appointed deputy head of Office of the President of Ukraine, the government office led by Andriy Yermak.

=== Political positions ===
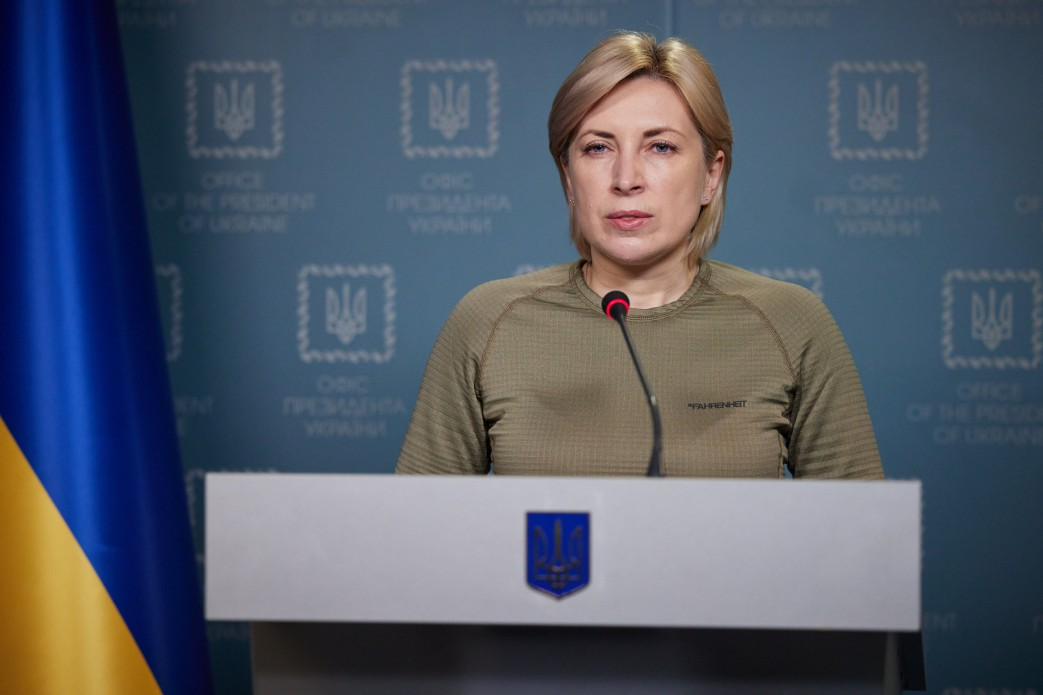
Vereshchuk during the 2022 Russian invasion of Ukraine

In 2013, before the Revolution of Dignity, Vereshchuk stated that she wished Ukraine had a President akin to Vladimir Putin, the President of Russia. She claimed she would vote for him because "He does good for Russia. He is acting in the interests of his country."

In 2018 Vereshchuk spoke out against the lionizing of Ukrainian nationalist idol Stepan Bandera by "manipulative politicians who wear embroidered shirts." She claimed that "it should be understood that this historical figure will never find a place in the Ukrainian pantheon of heroes."

Prior to becoming the candidate of Servant of the People for the post of Mayor of Kyiv in the 2020 Kyiv local election Vereshchuk stated that then incumbent mayor Vitaly Klichko was "a good mayor." After her nomination, she insinuated that Klichko should "have better understood both the people and their troubles."

==== Announcements ====
In June 2022 about the receipt of Russian passports by Ukrainians:

«Every receipt of a passport of the state-aggressor by a Ukrainian should be considered as a crime, no matter the motive. We should inform citizens who now live under temporary occupation. I realize this is harsh, but this is the matter of existence of the Ukrainian state.».

On 3 September 2022 about Ukrainians in occupied territories taking part in a possible referendum about joining Russia:

«For our citizens who will take part in this: it's an article of the Penal Code, actually. They are on a possibility of a crime penalty. If an act of a collaboration or taking part in a referendum or even agitation for it will be proved, punishment for this people could be up to 12 years of jail with confiscation.».

== Personal life ==
Vereshchuk is married, having previously been married, and has a son and a stepson.

== Awards ==
- Certificate of recognition and the Certificate of Merit awarded by Ukraine's Cabinet Office,
- The Order of St. Varvara,
- The Order of St. Pochaiv God's Mother,
- The Order of St. Nicholas.
- Jubilee Medal of "Twenty Years of Ukraine’s Independence".
