= Danchenko =

Danchenko (Cyrillic: Данченко) is a gender-neutral Ukrainian surname. It may refer to the following notable people:

- Igor Danchenko, Russian analyst in the United States
- Oleh Danchenko (born 1994), Ukrainian footballer
- Oleksandr Danchenko (born 1974), Ukrainian politician
- Vasily Nemirovich-Danchenko (1845–1936), Russian novelist and journalist, brother of Vladimir
- Vladimir Nemirovich-Danchenko (1858–1943), Russian playwright and theatre director
