= Huzenko =

Huzenko, also transliterated Guzenko or Gouzenko (Ukrainian or Russian: Гузенко) is a gender-neutral Ukrainian surname. It may refer to:

- Andriy Huzenko (born 1973), Ukrainian football player and coach
- Igor Gouzenko (1919–1982), cipher clerk for the Soviet Embassy to Canada who defected to Canada
- Maksym Huzenko (born 1981), Ukrainian politician
- Olha Huzenko (born 1956), Ukrainian rower
