= Ukraine's 122nd electoral district =

Verkhovna Rada constituency in Kyiv Oblast

- Electoral district for the Verkhovna Rada
- Region: Lviv Oblast
- Population: 178,460

Current Electoral district
- Created: 2012
Party
Pavlo Bakunets
Self Reliance

Ukraine's 122nd electoral district is a Verkhovna Rada constituency in Lviv Oblast, Western Ukraine. Established in its current form in 2012, it includes Yavoriv Raion and Zhovkva Raion. The district is home to 178,460 registered voters, and has 205 polling stations. Its member of parliament has been Pavlo Bakunets of the Self Reliance party since 2019.

== People's Deputies ==
Party	Member	Portrait	City	Election
Batkivshchyna	Vasyl Pazyniak		Zavadiv	2012
Independent	Volodymyr Parasyuk		Maidan	2014
Self Reliance	Pavlo Bakunets		Yavoriv	2019

== Elections ==
=== 2019 ===
2019 Ukrainian parliamentary election
Party	Candidate	Votes	%
Self Reliance	Pavlo Bakunets	13,438	14.8%
Holos	Vitaliy Andreyko	12,360	13.7%
Independent	Roman Demchyna	9,820	10.8%
Civil Position	Andriy Duma	9,639	10.6%
Servant of the People	Andriy Shumskyi	8,008	8.8%
European Solidarity	Ihor Camardak	7,732	8.5%
Svoboda	Mykola Zinko	6,058	6.7%
Batkivshchyna	Yevhen Rybchynskyi	4,408	4.9%
Rukh	Petro Shot	3,996	4.4%
Independent	Ihor Muravsky	2,930	3.2%
Others		12,141	13.3%
Total votes		90,530	100.0
Self Reliance gain from Independent			

=== 2014 ===
2014 Ukrainian parliamentary election
Party	Candidate	Votes	%
Independent	Volodymyr Parasyuk	69,281	56.6%
Petro Poroshenko Bloc	Taras Voznyak	12,484	10.2%
Batkivshchyna	Oleksandr Pavlyuk	12,465	10.2%
Independent	Ivan Bokalo	10,177	8.3%
Independent	Volodymyr Pekar	6,745	5.5%
Independent	Iryna Vereshchuk	5,469	4.5%
People's	Olha Davyd	2,662	2.2%
Independent	Lyudmyla Shubina	1,435	1.2%
Independent	Bohdan Kasper	747	0.6%
Zastup	Artur Sheshenya	551	0.4%
KPU	Viktor Harshyn	471	0.4%
Total votes		122,487	100.0
Independent gain from Batkivshchyna			

=== 2012 ===
2012 Ukrainian parliamentary election
Party	Candidate	Votes	%
Batkivshchyna	Vasyl Pazynak	66,195	55.9%
Independent	Taras Kozak	43,305	36.5%
Independent	Serhiy Savulyak	2,664	2.2%
Independent	Hryhoriy Babiy	1,253	1.1%
Party of Regions	Volodymyr Bosyi	989	0.8%
Our Ukraine	Serhiy Smishchik	837	0.7%
People's	Hanna Zhuk	702	0.6%
Independent	Bohdan Yakymovych	530	0.4%
KPU	Viktor Harshyn	508	0.4%
Independent	Ihor Hlova	457	0.4%
Others		1,050	0.9%
Total votes		118,490	100.0
Batkivshchyna win (new seat)			

== See also ==
- Electoral districts of Ukraine
- Foreign electoral district of Ukraine
