= Pavlo Bakunets =

Ukrainian politician

- Павло Бакунець
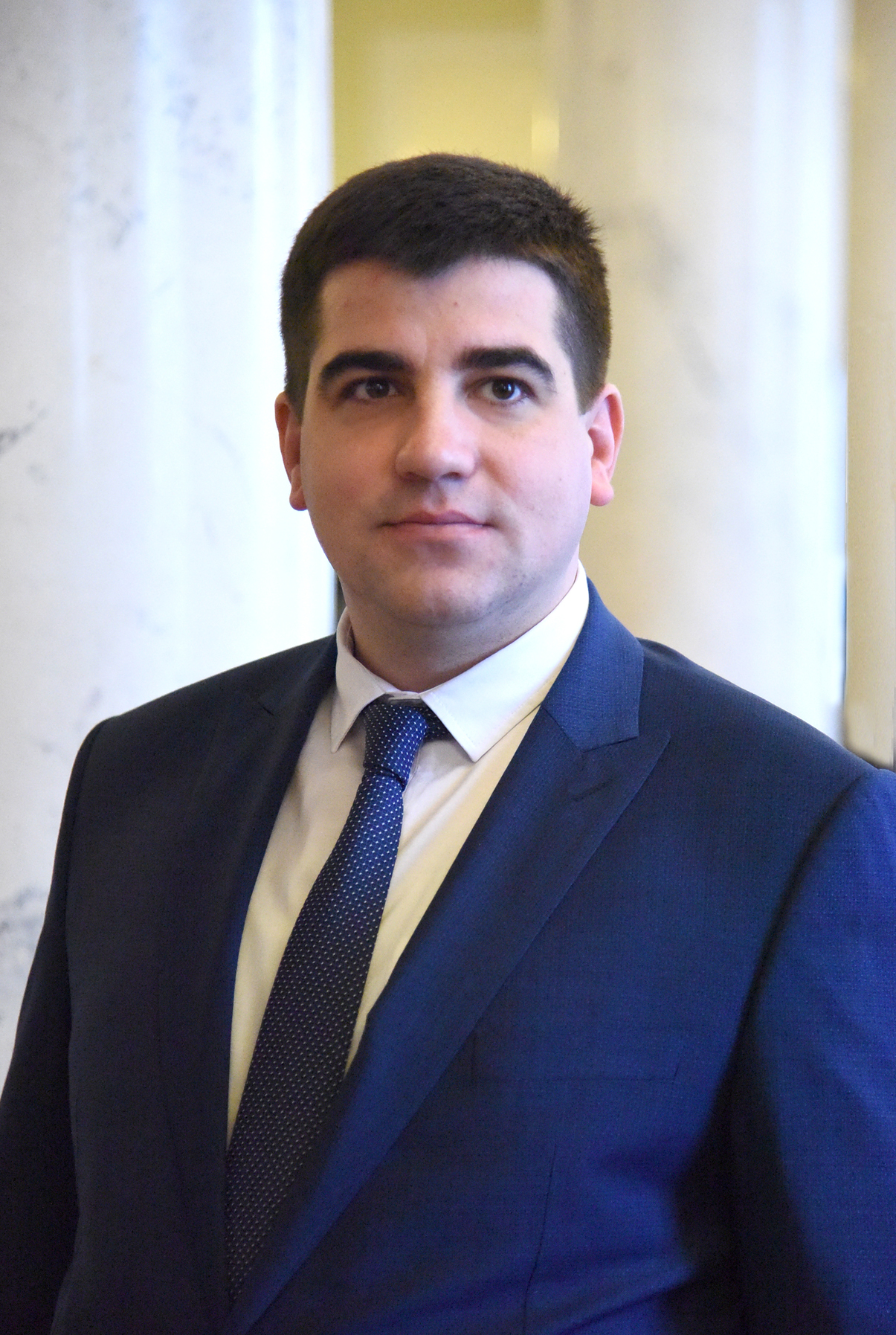
- Bakunets in 2020

Personal details
- Born: 10 July 1987 (age 39) Yavoriv, Lviv Oblast, Ukrainian SSR, Soviet Union
- Party: Samopomich
- Education: Ukrainian Catholic University

Pavlo Andriiovych Bakunets (Ukrainian: Павло Андрійович Бакунець) is a Ukrainian politician and a People's Deputy of the 9th Ukrainian Verkhovna Rada.

== Biography ==
Pavlo Andriiovych Bakunets was born on July 10, 1987, in Yavoriv, Lviv Oblast, Ukraine. He received a BA from the Ukrainian Catholic University in Lviv, also attended UCU's Lviv Business School, and graduated from the University of Lviv.

Bakunets became a representative on the local council of Yavoriv, and was on the ethics committee. From 2014 to 2015, he was the secretary of Yavoriv Municipality, and in 2015, he was elected mayor of Yavoriv, a position he held until 2019. He was the leader of the Yavoriv branch of the Self Reliance political party, and is the cofounder of Youth of Yavoriv Raion, an NGO.

=== Parliamentary Activity ===
On August 29, 2019, Bakunets became a Member of Ukrainian Parliament. In the 2019 Ukrainian parliamentary election, he was elected in Ukraine's 122nd electoral district and received 14.84% of the vote, a plurality.

Although elected a member of Self Reliance (the only Self Reliance MP elected in 2019), he joined the Trust parliamentary group once in the Verkhovna Rada, a move which was opposed by Self Reliance leader Oksana Syroyid.

In the Verkhovna Rada, he holds a number of positions. Bakunets is a member of the Verkhovna Rada Committee on Law and Political Affairs. Beyond that, he is:

- The deputy of the group of interparliament connections with the Republic of Cuba
- A member of interparliament connections with the Republic of Poland.
- A member of interparliament connections with the United States.

== Electoral history ==
=== 2019 Ukrainian parliamentary election ===
2019 Ukrainian parliamentary election, 122nd constituency
Party	Candidate	Votes	%
Self Reliance	Pavlo Bakunets	13,438	14.8%
Voice (Ukrainian political party)	Vitaliy Andreyko	12,360	13.7%
Independent	Roman Demchyna	9,820	10.8%
Civil Position	Andriy Duma	9,639	10.6%
Servant of the People	Andriy Shumskyi	8,008	8.8%
European Solidarity	Ihor Camardak	7,732	8.5%
Svoboda	Mykola Zinko	6,058	6.7%
Batkivshchyna	Yevhen Rybchynskyi	4,408	4.9%
Rukh	Petro Shot	3,996	4.4%
Independent	Ihor Muravsky	2,930	3.2%
Others		12,141	13.3%
Total votes		90,530	100.0
Self Reliance gain from Independent			
