= Maksym Huzenko =

Ukrainian politician

- Максим Гузенко
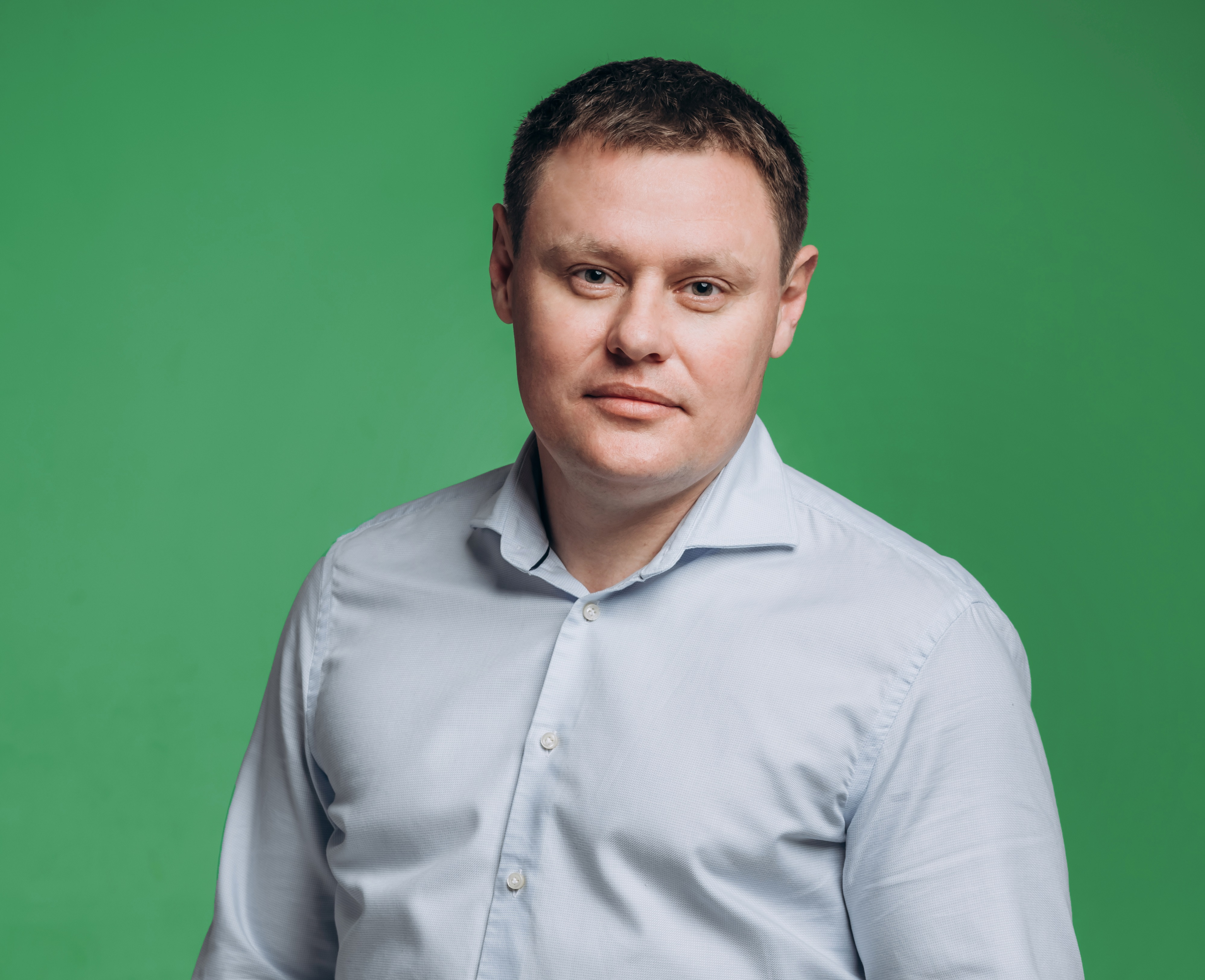

People's Deputy of Ukraine
- Incumbent
- Assumed office 29 August 2019
- Preceded by: Mykola Lavryk
- Constituency: Sumy Oblast, No. 161

Personal details
- Born: 4 September 1981 (age 45) Sumy, Ukrainian SSR, Soviet Union (now Ukraine)
- Party: Servant of the People
- Other political affiliations: Independent; Self Reliance
- Education: Sumy National Agrarian University

Maksym Vasylovych Huzenko (Ukrainian: Максим Васильович Гузенко; born 8 September 1981) is a Ukrainian politician currently serving as a People's Deputy of Ukraine from Ukraine's 161st electoral district since 29 August 2019. He is a member of Servant of the People.

== Early life and career ==
Maksym Vasylovych Huzenko was born on 8 September 1981 in the city of Sumy, then under the Soviet Union. He is a graduate of the Sumy National Agrarian University specialising in agronomy. Prior to his election, Huzenko was involved in the agricultural business. He was director and owner of multiple businesses, among them Ahrokhim-Partner TOV, Naton farm, and Ahro Kontur TOV. He is also head of the All-Ukrainian Association for Distribution of Seeds and Plant Protection Products in Sumy Oblast organisation.

== Political career ==
In the 2010 and 2015 Ukrainian local elections, Huzenko was an unsuccessful candidate for the Sumy City Council, first from the Ukrainian People's Party and then from Self Reliance.

In the 2019 Ukrainian parliamentary election, Huzenko ran to represent Ukraine's 161st electoral district as the candidate of Servant of the People. At the time of the election, he was an independent. He was successfully elected, defeating independent Anatoliy Kobzarenko with 37.37% of the vote to Kobzarenko's 19.0%

In the Verkhovna Rada (Ukraine's parliament), Kobzarenko joined the Servant of the People faction and the Verkhovna Rada Committee on Agricultural and Land Policies.

Huzenko is among the top 10 People's Deputies to have declared the most plots of land in his name.
