= Agreement on settlement of political crisis in Ukraine =

Ukrainian treaty signed in 2014

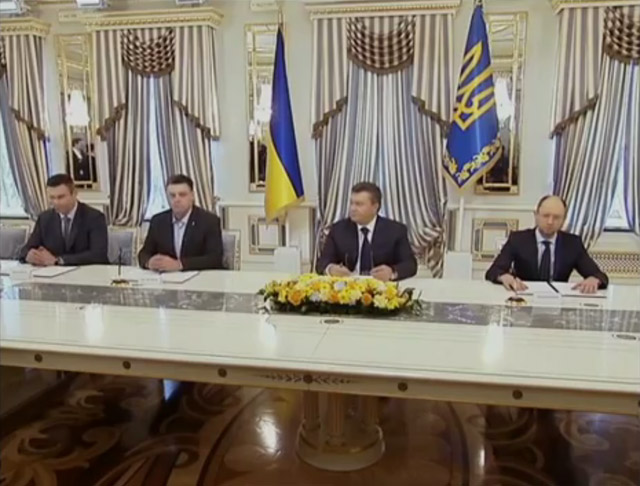
The signing of the agreement

The Agreement on the Settlement of the Political Crisis in Ukraine (Ukrainian: Угода про врегулювання політичної кризи в Україні, Russian: Соглашение об урегулировании политического кризиса в Украине) was an agreement signed on 21 February 2014 by then-President of Ukraine, Viktor Yanukovych, and the leaders of Ukraine's parliamentary opposition, with mediation from the European Union and Russia. The agreement aimed to reduce bloodshed at the Euromaidan demonstrations in Kyiv, which had become significantly more violent during the Revolution of Dignity and resulted in the deaths of over 100 people. It also sought to end the political crisis caused by Euromaidan, which had begun in November 2013 in response to Ukrainian authorities' decision to suspend the signing of the European Union–Ukraine Association Agreement.

The opposition was represented by Vitali Klitschko (of the Ukrainian Democratic Alliance for Reform), Arseniy Yatsenyuk (of the All-Ukrainian Union "Fatherland") and Oleh Tyahnybok (of Svoboda). The signing was formally witnessed by the Foreign Ministers of Poland and Germany, Radosław Sikorski and Frank-Walter Steinmeier, as well as the head of the Department for Continental Europe of the French Ministry of Foreign Affairs, Eric Fournier. Vladimir Lukin, the Special Representative of the President of the Russian Federation, participated in the discussions but declined to sign the agreement.

The agreement called for a return to the 2004 Constitution, establishing a parliamentary-presidential system of government, early presidential elections by the end of 2014, and the formation of a "government of national trust". It also called for the removal of security troops from downtown Kyiv, a cessation of violence, and the disarmament of the opposition.

Although nearly all sides, except Russia, signed the agreement, it was not implemented. Protests continued after its signing, and Yanukovych eventually fled to Russia. With the Euromaidan protesters emerging victorious, an arrest warrant was issued for Yanukovych, who effectively became a fugitive.

== Text ==
Concerned with the tragic loss of life in Ukraine, seeking an immediate end of bloodshed and determined to pave the way for a political resolution of the crisis, We, the signing parties, have agreed upon the following:

1. Within 48 hours of the signing of this agreement, a special law will be adopted, signed and promulgated, which will restore the Constitution of 2004 including amendments passed until now. Signatories declare their intention to create a coalition and form a national unity government within 10 days thereafter.

2. Constitutional reform, balancing the powers of the President, the government and parliament, will start immediately and be completed in September 2014.

3. Presidential elections will be held as soon as the new Constitution is adopted but no later than December 2014. New electoral laws will be passed, and a new Central Election Commission will be formed on the basis of proportionality and in accordance with the OSCE & Venice commission rules.

4. Investigation into recent acts of violence will be conducted under joint monitoring from the authorities, the opposition and the Council of Europe.

5. The authorities will not impose a state of emergency. The authorities and the opposition will refrain from the use of violence. The Parliament will adopt the 3rd amnesty, covering the same range of illegal actions as the 17th February 2014 law.

Both parties will undertake serious efforts for the normalisation of life in the cities and villages by withdrawing from administrative and public buildings and unblocking streets, city parks and squares.

Illegal weapons should be handed over to the Ministry of Interior bodies within 24 hours of the special law, referred to in point 1 hereof, coming into force. After the aforementioned period, all cases of illegal carrying, and storage of weapons will fall under the law of Ukraine. The forces of authorities and of the opposition will step back from confrontational posture. The Government will use law enforcement forces exclusively for the physical protection of public buildings.

6. The Foreign Ministers of France, Germany, Poland and the Special Representative of the President of the Russian Federation call for an immediate end to all violence and confrontation.
Kyiv, 21 February 2014

Signatories

Viktor Yanukovych, president of Ukraine

For the Opposition

Vitaliy Klichko, UDAR
Oleh Tyahnybok, Svoboda
Arseniy Yatsenyuk, Batkivshchyna

Witnessed by:

For the EU

Radosław Sikorski, Polish foreign minister
Frank-Walter Steinmeier, German foreign minister
Laurent Fabius, French foreign minister

For the Russian Federation

Vladimir Lukin, Russian special envoy

== Reactions to the Agreement and subsequent developments ==
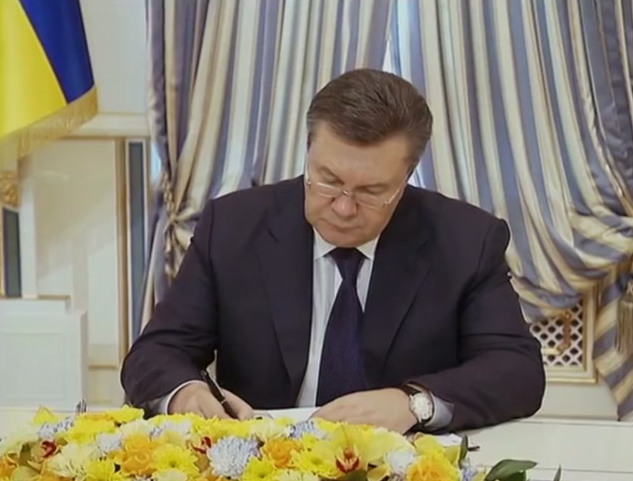
President of Ukraine Viktor Yanukovych signing the Agreement, 21 February 2014.

Vladimir Lukin explained his refusal to sign the Agreement, stating, "Moscow decided not to sign these agreements for a very valid reason. In fact, it is not very clear who the subject of this agreement is, [...as] the forces and people who should implement it aren't seen" in the agreement.

On 21 February, Volodymyr Parasyuk stated that he and other "Maidan self-Defense" activists were not satisfied with the gradual political reforms specified in the agreement. He demanded instead the immediate resignation of President Yanukovych and otherwise threatened to storm the presidential administration and the Verkhovna Rada. His statement was met with applause.

The leader of the Right Sector, Dmytro Yarosh, refused to comply with the agreement and stated that it did not provide a clear commitment to the President's resignation, the dissolution of the Verkhovna Rada, and the punishment of heads of law enforcement agencies and those who issued "criminal orders, which had killed about a hundred Ukrainian citizens".

On the evening of 21 February, Yanukovych traveled to Kharkiv, where he was expecting to participate in a "Congress of South-Eastern Regions and Crimea". Many pro-Russian politicians and Russian diplomats were present, and the Crimean delegation openly proposed seceding of the regions from Ukraine. The sentiment on the council, however, was against secession, so Yanukovych ended up not participating.

Yanukovych never restored the 2004 Constitution, as stipulated by the first point of the agreement. Instead, on 22 February he attempted to board a private jet to Moscow from Donetsk airport, but was stopped by Ukrainian border force. Subsequently he was picked up by unidentified helicopters in open field in Donetsk oblast' and later reappeared in Russia.

On the evening of 22 February, Euromaidan activists occupied the government quarter as law enforcement abandoned it. They put forward several new demands, including the immediate resignation of President Yanukovych.

Russian President Vladimir Putin later described the Agreement as a practical surrender of power because Yanukovych agreed to all demands of the opposition.

== Positions ==
=== Presidency of Ukraine ===
Viktor Yanukovych stated:

The opposition and radical forces, represented on the Maidan [...and] in other regions, they had to disarm and vacate all the occupied territories. However, this was not implemented. As a result, Kyiv was overrun by armed men who began to destroy homes, religious institutions, and temples, who began to make completely innocent people suffer. People were robbed and beaten on the streets. And it continues today. The agreement, of course, gave us some hope. But considering what happened next, it's difficult to describe it with any positive terms.

During an appeal on 28 March 2014, Yanukovych said: "I will work to ensure the lawful implementation of 21 February agreement and will make every effort to organize it effectively. This farce has been completely exposed, and those responsible for the state's collapse will be duly punished".

On 2 April 2014, Yanukovych gave an interview to Russian and foreign media:

Immediately after the signing of the agreement, I began to fulfill the obligations that the government assumed. As the President of Ukraine, I instructed the police to retreat from the Maidan without delay. The radical faction responded with shooting... I have always upheld the principle that no power is worth a drop of shed blood. ... In 2004, during the events of the Orange Revolution, I did not allow clashes between the opposing sides. When I signed the agreement, I was committed to keeping it and believed that the guarantors, the EU foreign ministers, would fulfill their obligations as well. I did not foresee that this was a trap for the authorities and the President of Ukraine, as militants began to openly attack me with weapons that very night... I am, first and foremost, a living person. Yet I didn't even hear words of condemnation against the bandits, who began to be called activists.

=== Ukrainian opposition ===
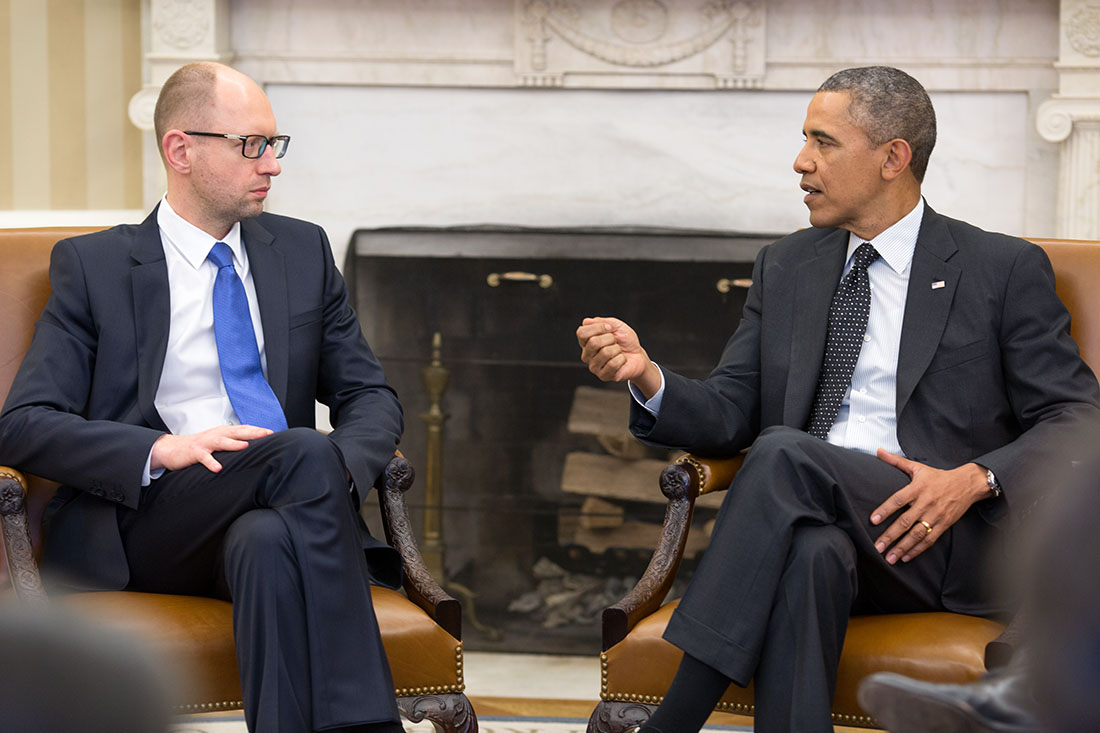
Arseniy Yatsenyuk and President Barack Obama in the Oval Office. 12 March 2014.

After voting to remove Yanukovych, the Verkhovna Rada appointed Arseniy Yatsenyuk as Prime Minister of Ukraine. He stated:

The first basic commitment was the return to the 2004 Constitution. However, the next day, Viktor Yanukovych publicly refused to sign the bill and walked away from the Agreement. The government of Ukraine was formed as stipulated by the Agreement, specifically an inclusive government that received support even from the new opposition, represented by the Party of Regions. A constitutional majority of 371 votes in Parliament supported this government.

Viktor Musiyaka, a professor of law and one of the developers of the Constitution, stated:

[Within] 48 hours of signing the agreement with the opposition, [Yanukovich] failed to sign the law on the renewal of the Constitution of Ukraine as amended on December 8, 2004, which had been adopted by the Verkhovna Rada. By doing so, he effectively disavowed his signature on the Agreement, rendering it legally null and void. [...] If Yanukovych wanted to maintain his declared reputation as the legitimate head of state, he should have asserted his unconditional execution of powers and at least vetoed the laws passed by the Parliament. However, to do this, he needed to remain in his position.

=== United States ===
According to U.S. permanent representative to the UN Samantha Power: "It was Yanukovych who failed to abide by the terms of that agreement, fleeing Kyiv, and ultimately Ukraine".

=== Russia ===
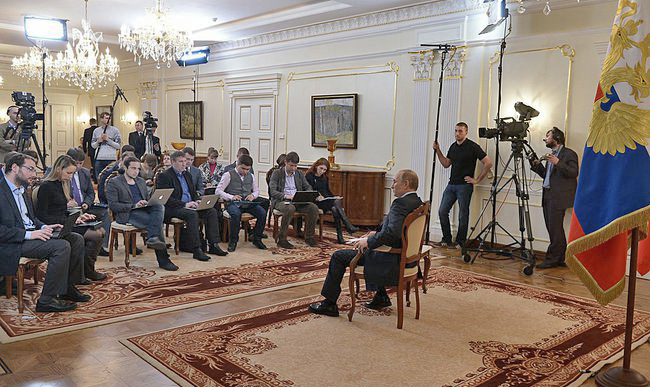
Press conference of Russian President Vladimir Putin on the situation in Ukraine. 4 March 2014.

Russia refused to sign the agreement. The next day, on 22 February 2014, Minister of Foreign Affairs Sergey Lavrov urged the foreign Ministers of Germany, France and Poland to put pressure on the Ukrainian opposition to implement the agreement and resolve the political crisis. He stated:

According to this agreement, the authorities refrained from imposing a state of emergency and withdrew law enforcement from the streets. The opposition did not fulfill any of its commitments. Illegal weapons were not surrendered, public buildings and streets in Kyiv were not completely cleared, and radicals continue to control cities. Instead of the promised creation of a government of national unity, the formation of a government of victors was announced.

On 5 March 2014, Lavrov met with US Secretary of state John Kerry. According to Lavrov, they agreed on the necessity of implementing the agreement. Lavrov also planned to meet with the foreign ministers of France, Germany, and Poland, who were witnesses at the signing ceremony.

Russian President Vladimir Putin spoke on Yanukovych's actions:

[...Yanukovich] gave the order to withdraw all police forces from the capital, and they complied with his order. He went to the event in Kharkiv, and as soon as he had left for Kharkiv, instead of vacating the previously occupied administrative buildings, [the protestors] immediately seized the presidential residence and the governmental offices, instead of trying to fulfill what we had agreed.

=== European Union ===
The foreign ministers of Germany, France and Poland (Frank-Walter Steinmeier, Laurent Fabius and Radosław Sikorski) urged the new Ukrainian government to respect the agreement of 21 February. They issued a joint statement on 31 March 2014: "As intermediaries for the conclusion, we call on the Ukrainian authorities to do everything possible to the basic principles contained in the document became part of the Ukrainian policy".
