= Iryna Suslova =

Ukrainian politician

- Ірина Суслова
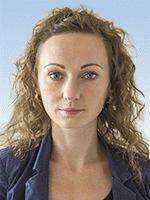

People's Deputy of Ukraine
- In office 27 November 2014 – 29 August 2019

Personal details
- Born: 5 August 1988 (age 37) Zhytomyr, Ukrainian SSR, Soviet Union
- Website: http://irynasuslova.com/

Iryna Mykolayivna Suslova (Ukrainian: Іри́на Микола́ївна Су́слова; born 5 August 1988 in Zhytomyr) is a Ukrainian politician. She was elected to the Verkhovna Rada in the 2014 Ukrainian parliamentary election, appearing sixth on the party list of Self Reliance. Suslova was excluded from the group in February 2015 after voting for Viktor Shokin for General Prosecutor of Ukraine. On 30 March 2016 she joined the Petro Poroshenko Bloc parliamentary faction. In 2016, Iryna was nominated on the Top 30 under 30 award by Kyiv Post.
