= Pavlo Kyshkar =

Ukrainian politician

- Павло Кишкар
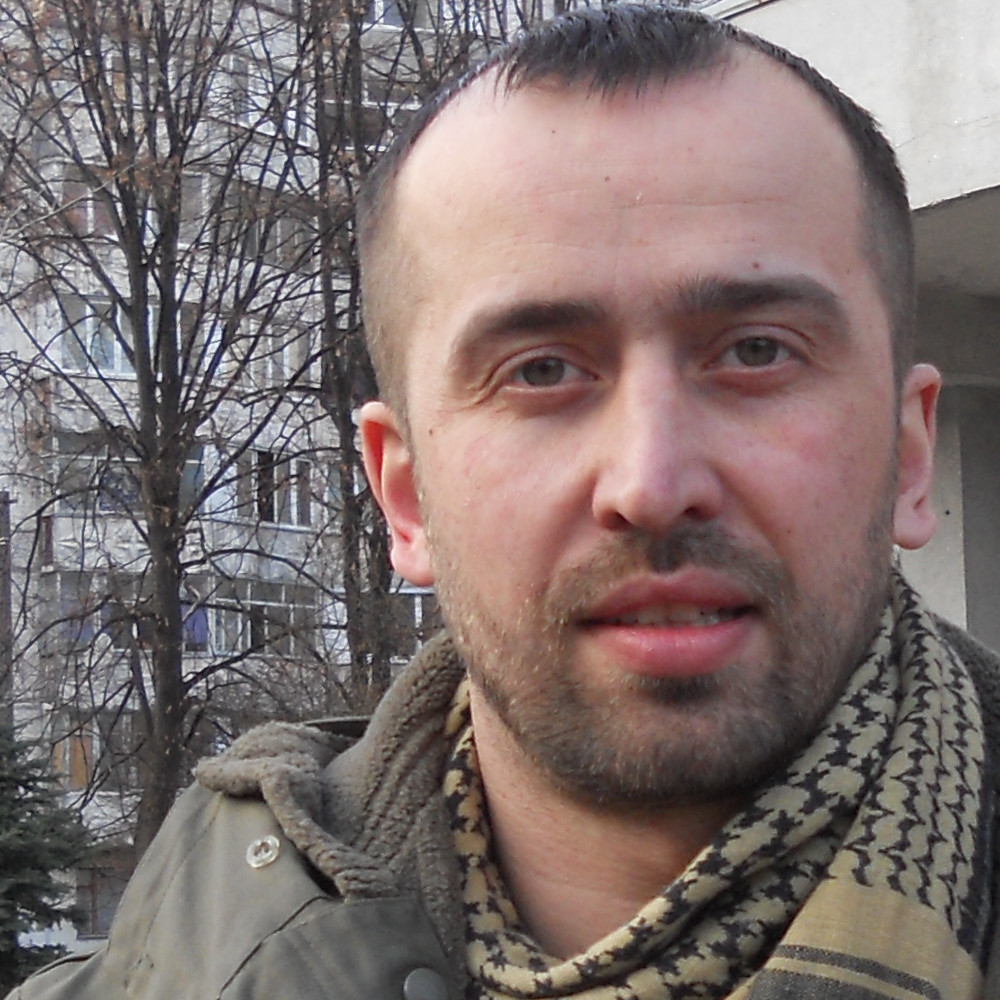

People's Deputy of Ukraine
- In office 27 November 2014 – 29 August 2019

Personal details
- Born: 22 September 1980 (age 45) Velykyi Trostianets, Poltava Raion, Ukrainian SSR, Soviet Union
- Party: People's Movement of Ukraine
- Other political affiliations: Self Reliance (expelled on 31 August 2015)

Pavlo Mykolayovych Kyshkar (Ukrainian: Павло Миколайович Кишкар; born 22 September 1980) is a Ukrainian politician. He worked as a financial controller at a tourist company in Thailand until 2014, when he returned to Ukraine and became an information coordinator for the Donbas Battalion, a unit of the military police in Ukraine. Appearing seventh on the party list of Self Reliance, he was elected to the Verkhovna Rada in the 2014 Ukrainian parliamentary election.

Kyshkar was expelled from Self Reliance on 31 August 2015 for his support of amendments to the Ukrainian Constitution that would lead to decentralization and greater powers for areas held by pro-Russian separatists. On 31 March 2016 he joined the Petro Poroshenko Bloc parliamentary faction. Kyshkar also joined (the political party) People's Movement of Ukraine in April 2016. On 21 December 2017 Kyshkar left the Petro Poroshenko Bloc parliamentary faction.

In the 2019 Ukrainian parliamentary election Kyshkar failed to win a seat as People's Movement of Ukraine candidate in constituency 147 situated in Poltava Oblast.
