= Natalia Veselova =

Ukrainian politician

- Наталія Василівна Веселова
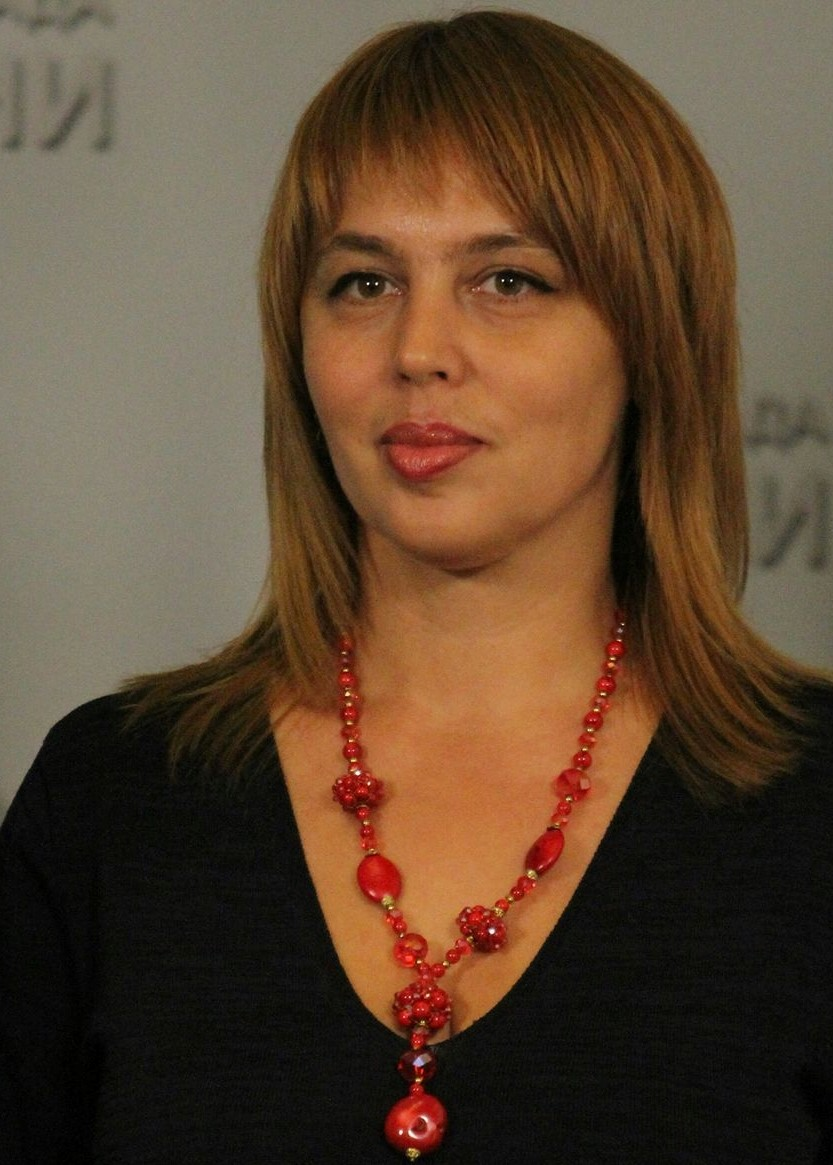

People's Deputy of Ukraine
- In office 27 November 2014 – 29 August 2019

Personal details
- Born: 27 August 1975 (age 50) Sloviansk, Donetsk Oblast, Ukrainian SSR, Soviet Union
- Party: Independent (until October 2017 Self Reliance)

Natalia Vasylivna Veselova (Ukrainian: Наталія Василівна Веселова; born August 27, 1975) is a Ukrainian politician. She was elected to the Verkhovna Rada in the October 2014 Ukrainian parliamentary election, appearing 9th on the party list of Samopomich. Director of the charity 'Charity Fund for Helping the Donbass Battalion'. She failed to get reelected in the 2019 Ukrainian parliamentary election.

== Biography ==
Veselova was born in Sloviansk. In 1997 graduated from the Sloviansk State Pedagogic University. In 1996 started working as an elementary school teacher, in 1997 started teaching Ukrainian Language and Literature in high school in Sloviansk.

In 1997-2000 worked as a specialist for pension assignment in the Sloviansk District Administration for the Social Support. In 2000 started working in the Sloviansk District Administration for Labour and Social Support, as a First Category Specialist in supporting disabled veterans and workers. In 2004 was appointed to the post of the First Category Specialist to the Department of Pensions in the administration of the Pensions Fund of Ukraine in Proletar district in Donetsk.

In August 2005 - May 2014 worked as a Head State Social Inspector of the Labour Administration in Proletar District Council in the city of Donetsk.

She is the Director of the Ukrainian Charity 'Ukrainian Legal Foundation'. Starting July 2013 is a member of VEGO Mama-86, took active part in the environmental movement in Ukraine.

In 2014, on the initiative of the Commander of the Donbas Battalion, Semen Semenchenko, founded the charity 'Charity Fund for Helping the Donbas Battalion', which she is running on voluntary basis until now.

Veselova was elected to the Verkhovna Rada in the October 2014 Ukrainian parliamentary election, appearing 9th on the party list of Samopomich. In October 2017 Veselova was expelled from the Samopomich parliamentary faction because the party claimed she "did not share the position of the faction, its values and principles”, especially concerning the political status of the Ukrainian territory controlled by the breakaway self-declared Donetsk and Luhansk People's Republics. She did not join another faction.

In the 2019 Ukrainian parliamentary election Veselova failed to win a seat as "People's Power" candidate in constituency 51 situated in Donetsk Oblast, she gained 0.6% of the vote.

Natalia Veselova is married and has two children.
