= Volodymyr Parasyuk =

Ukrainian politician and military commander

- Володимир Парасюк
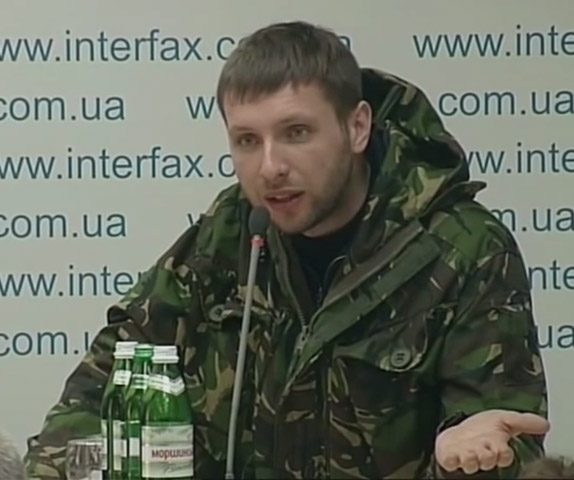
- Parasyuk in February 2014

People's Deputy of Ukraine
- In office 27 November 2014 – 29 August 2019
- Preceded by: Vasyl Pazynak
- Succeeded by: Pavlo Bakunets
- Constituency: Lviv Oblast, No. 122

Personal details
- Born: 9 July 1987 (age 38) Maidan, Ukrainian SSR, Soviet Union (now Ukraine)
- Party: Independent
- Other political affiliations: UKROP

Military service
- Allegiance: Ukraine
- Branch/service: Special Tasks Patrol Police
- Years of service: 2014
- Unit: Dnipro Battalion
- Battles/wars: Russo-Ukrainian War; War in Donbas; Battle of Ilovaisk

Volodymyr Zinoviyovych Parasyuk (Ukrainian: Володи́мир Зіно́війович Парасю́к; born 9 July 1987) is a Ukrainian military commander and politician who served as a People's Deputy of Ukraine from 27 November 2014 to 29 August 2019. Previously, he served as a member of the Dnipro Battalion and as a protest leader during Euromaidan.

== Biography ==
Volodymyr Zinoviyovych Parasyuk was born on 9 July 1987 in the village of Maidan, in Ukraine's Lviv Oblast.

Parasyuk took part in the Euromaidan protests, where he was a sotnik (commander) of a group of defenders of the Maidan (a sotnia). He became known for his Euromaidan speech on 21 February 2014, in which he rejected the terms of an agreement between opposition leaders and Ukrainian President Viktor Yanukovych. In his speech, Parasyuk delivered an ultimatum, demanding Yanukovych's resignation and vowing his group would storm Yanukovych's Mezhyhirya Residence at 10 a.m. the next day without it. The next morning, Yanukovych left the country.

Later, Parasyuk fought in the war in Donbas as a member of the Dnipro Battalion, where he was taken prisoner by Russian forces during the battle of Ilovaisk and illegally moved to Rostov on Don. He was later released with other Ukrainian prisoners of war.

He studied in the Faculty of Electronics at Lviv University, specializing in physical and biomedical electronics, but did not graduate from the program. He later studied banking, and in 2016, he graduated from Lviv University with a bachelor's degree in economics.

Parasyuk was a member of the Student Brotherhood of Lviv University and the far-right Congress of Ukrainian Nationalists. He was elected to the Verkhovna Rada during the 2014 Ukrainian parliamentary election. As an independent candidate, Parasyuk won a parliamentary seat in Ukraine's 122nd electoral district with 56.56% of the vote. In the Verkhovna Rada, he joined the inter-factional group Ukrainian Association of Patriots (UKROP).

The Central Election Commission of Ukraine refused Parasyuk to register as a candidate for the snap 2019 Ukrainian parliamentary election because the required deposit was made by an "inappropriate person". This error could not be corrected because Parasyuk submitted his documents for registration on the last day it was possible.
