= Self Reliance (political party) =

Self Reliance Samopomich Самопоміч
- Leader: Oksana Syroyid
- Founder: Andriy Sadovyi
- Founded: 29 December 2012
- Headquarters: Lviv
- Membership (2019): ±2,000
- Ideology: Christian democracy; Liberal conservatism; Pro-Europeanism
- Political position: Centre-right
- European affiliation: European People's Party (observer)
- Colours: Green; Blue
- Verkhovna Rada: 1 / 450
- Regions (2020): 222 / 43,122
- Lviv Oblast Council: 9 / 84

Website
- samopomich.ua

The Association "Self Reliance" (Ukrainian: Об'єднання «Самопоміч», romanized: Obiednannia “Samopomich”) is a liberal conservative and Christian democratic political party in Ukraine.

It was founded on 29 December 2012, and identifies with the ideology of "Christian morality and common sense." The name of the party is similar to the name of the NGO, founded by former leader, Andriy Sadovyi in 2004. The party won 33 seats in the 2014 Ukrainian parliamentary election. In the 2019 Ukrainian parliamentary election, the party won a single seat, the 122nd electoral district in Lviv Oblast.

== Etymology ==
The name and ideology of the party is referring to the history of Ukrainian cooperative movement, which rose to prominence in Western Ukraine in the beginning of the 20th century. The financial societies that appeared prior to World War I in Galicia were formed as a part of Ukrainian national movement. The idea to start Ukrainian national financial cooperation societies belonged to Dr. Yevhen Olesnytskyi, lawyer, the head of Stryi's Prosvita movement and member of the Austro-Hungarian Parliament. He started to organise seminars for like-minded people, who supported the idea of solving economic problems before resolving political issues. The fight against poverty and backwardness was the main goal of the organisation, which quickly acquired popularity. The local Prosvita activists supported the call for action, and already in 1904 Ostap Nyzhankivskyi, composer and priest from the village Zavadiv near Stryi, founded first cooperative of milk producers.

The idea proved to be popular among Ukrainian peasants; in 1914, the Union of Milk Cooperatives united more than 100 unions under the leadership of Ostap Nyzhankivskyi. Soon the Union started to issue its own newspaper, which received the name 'Samopomich'. The WWI and the following Polish-Ukrainian war interrupted the movement, as its activists devoted themselves to the work for the West Ukrainian People's Republic. The leader of the movement, Ostap Nyzhankivskyi, became the district commissar of Stryi and died in the battle for the city on 13 May 1919.

The cooperative activism reemerged after the WWI. The officers of the Ukrainian Galician Army who had emigrated to Czechoslovakia and Denmark, returned to Ukraine and brought there the experience of European cooperative movement. Until the late 1930s, the new cooperative 'Ukrainian Milk Society 'Maslosoyiuz' united up to 500,000 farms, and became an important player in the European agriculture market.

The practice of cooperation spread to other spheres of life: Galician Ukrainians founded their own bank (bank 'Dnister'), trade network (shops of 'Maslosoyiuz' and 'People's Trade'), supervision bodies (Revision Union of Ukrainian Cooperatives), insurance companies, educational system, etc. Such organisations, as Sokil, Plast, Sport Society 'Ukraine' popularised healthy lifestyle, the Taras Shevchenko Academic Society united scientists and intellectuals. The World War II and Soviet repressions brought an end to the civic activity on the territory of Ukraine.

== History ==
=== Early history ===
The contemporary history of the political party Self Reliance started in 2004, with the creation of an NGO called "Self Reliance". Andriy Sadovyi, who was the director of the Institute of the City Development, initiated the foundation of an organisation, which would derive from the history and traditions of the Ukrainian cooperation movement. Thus, the charity "Self Reliance" was established on 4 November 2004. The main activities of the organisation were: promoting legal literacy among the citizens, promoting healthy lifestyle, organisation of the volunteer movement and establishing local cooperation entities.

In 2006, Andriy Sadovyi was elected the mayor of Lviv. He relied on the Self Reliance team in creating the development strategy for the city of Lviv. In 2010, Sadovyi was reelected for the office of mayor.

On 14 October 2012, Sadovyi began the formation of the Self Reliance political party. The party united the legacy of Ukrainian cooperative movement and Christian-democratic ideology. Self Reliance was registered as a political party on 29 December 2012. In 2013, Self Reliance had its first constituent assembly in the Building of Pedagogical Museum in Kyiv. The party started to form local representation units and develop ideological approach. Self Reliance activists participated in Euromaidan.

==== Kyiv City Council elections ====
Self Reliance participated in the 25 May 2014 elections to the Kyiv City Council. The party asked the citizens to propose candidates for the election, and assigned the position in the party list according to the preferences of the public. In that election, the party received 7.4% of votes and won five seats in the Council.

=== 2014 parliamentary elections and faction ===
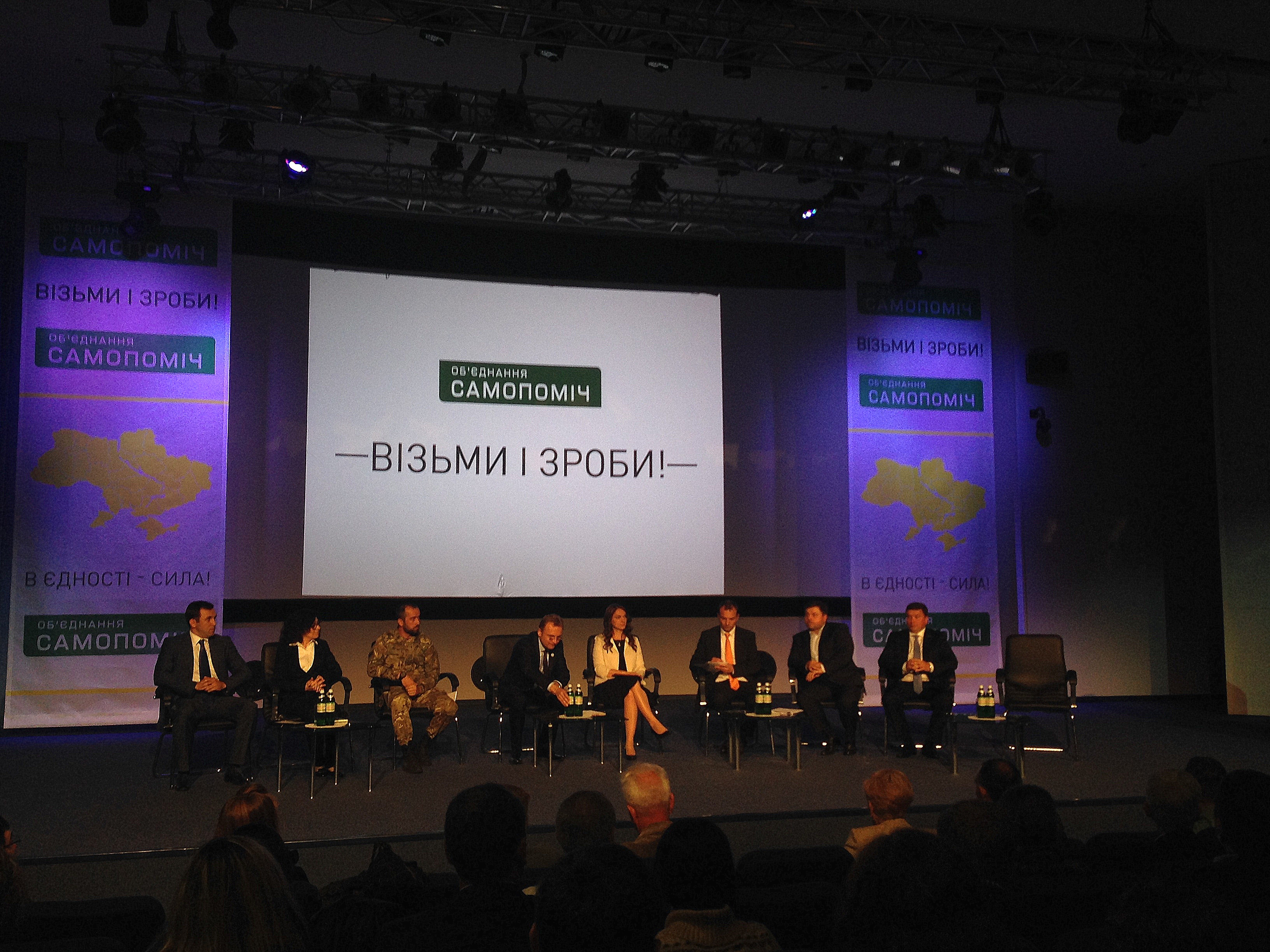
Self Reliance party conference in Kyiv in the lead up to the 2014 elections

On 28 February 2014, the party's leader Andriy Sadovyi, said Self Reliance would take part in the snap parliamentary elections scheduled for October 2014. In the Ukrainian parliamentary election Hanna Hopko headed the party list, followed by Donbas Battalion commander Semen Semenchenko, while Sadovyi obtained the 50th place. The party campaigned for local self-organisation and decentralisation. The party finished third in the election.

It was the only party which did not have any former parliamentarians on its election list but rather people from community NGOs and medium-sized businesses. Candidates of Volia were included in the election list of Self Reliance. Its parliamentary faction received 33 mandates including one won at constituency elections. The faction includes experts-activists out of the Reanimation Package of Reforms (a public initiative), military personnel and business representatives (mostly IT-related). By party affiliation, the faction consists mostly out of unaffiliated deputies, while there is one deputy of the Ukrainian People's Party and only three members of the Self Reliance party.

The top ten members of parliament were Hanna Hopko, Semen Semenchenko, Oleksiy Skrypnyk, Oksana Syroyid, Viktor Kryvenko, Iryna Suslova, Pavlo Kyshkar, Aliona Babak, Natalia Veselova and Oleksandr Danchenko.

Following the elections the party became a member of the coalition supporting the current second Yatsenyuk Government and it had one minister in this government, Minister of Agrarian Policy and Food Oleksiy Pavlenko.

Hopko and Kryvenko were expelled from Self Reliance on 31 August 2015 for violating faction discipline, as they supported the amendments to the Ukrainian Constitution that would lead to decentralization and greater powers for the pro-Russian separatists on the territory they occupied during the War in Donbas. By late October 2015, the Self Reliance faction in the Rada had shrunk from 33 seats to 26 seats.

The party did not do particularly well in the 2015 Ukrainian local elections (winning approximately 10% of the votes); but its candidate Oleksandr Senkevych was elected Mayor of Mykolayiv in the elections. But the following years party factions in city councils dissolved themselves, some factions rebranded themselves to a new local party (as happened to the party's Kyiv City Council and Kyiv Oblast Council factions) and party deputies transferred to other factions.

On 4 February 2016, leader of Self Reliance parliamentary faction Oleh Berezyuk said Pavlenko no longer represented his party in the second Yatsenyuk Government.

On 17 February 2016, after a supported by the party but failed motion of no confidence against the government, Self Reliance issued an official statement on its Facebook page in which it argued "A cynical coup has occurred in Ukraine, with the help of the president, the prime minister, the kleptocratic part of the coalition, and the oligarch bloc" that led to the second Yatsenyuk government being an "illegitimate government". The next day Self Reliance left the coalition.

The party did not join the coalition that supports 14 April 2016 installed Groysman Government.

From Autumn 2015 until June 2016, party members were engaged in talks on an attempt to form a political party around then Governor of Odesa Oblast Mikheil Saakashvili with members of the parliamentary group Interfactional Union "Eurooptimists", Democratic Alliance and possibly Self Reliance until this projection collapsed in June 2016.

=== 2019 and 2020 elections ===
Self Reliance announced on 3 October 2018 that party leader Andriy Sadovyi would be their candidate in the 2019 Ukrainian presidential election. He indeed became a candidate in the election from 8 January until 1 March 2019, when he decided to withdraw to support the candidacy of Anatoliy Hrytsenko. In these elections, Hrytsenko did not proceed to the second round of the election; in the first round, he placed fifth with 6.91% of the votes.

In April and May 2019, seven members of the party's parliamentary faction left the party but remained in the Self Reliance faction.

In the July 2019 Ukrainian parliamentary election, 13 of the party's incumbent MPs were on the Self Reliance party list, while four incumbent Self Reliance MPs tried to get reelected for the party Voice, another four for Strength and Honor and one for Servant of the People. In the parliamentary election, Self Reliance won one seat (in one of the electoral constituencies) while only scoring 0.62% of the national vote. Self Reliance candidate Pavlo Bakunets won their only parliamentary seat by winning the electoral district of Yavoriv with 14.84% of the votes.

In October 2019, the former party leader Sadovyi was succeeded by Oksana Syroyid.

In the 2020 Ukrainian local elections, the party did not make the top 10 of winners of the election; thus, she scored less than the 1.62% of the available seats won by the Radical Party of Oleh Lyashko. In total, the party gained 223 deputies (0.52% of all available mandates) in the elections. The party won nine of the 84 seats of the Lviv Oblast Council (the winner in this election with 28 seats was European Solidarity) and 17 of the 64 seats in the Lviv City Council (coming second to European Solidarity's 26 seats) and Sadovy was reelected mayor of Lviv in the second round of the Lviv mayoral election with 62.25% of the vote (he had gained 40.09% in the first round).

== Ideology ==
According to former party leader Andriy Sadovyi, Self Reliance shares the liberal conservatism ideology, but Timofiy Mylovanov of the University of Pittsburgh disagrees, claiming, (Note: Based on his 2015 study of Ukraine's main parties on their legislative track records.) "They have no ideology. Some of their laws are conservative, some are populist, and some are liberal".

== Election results ==
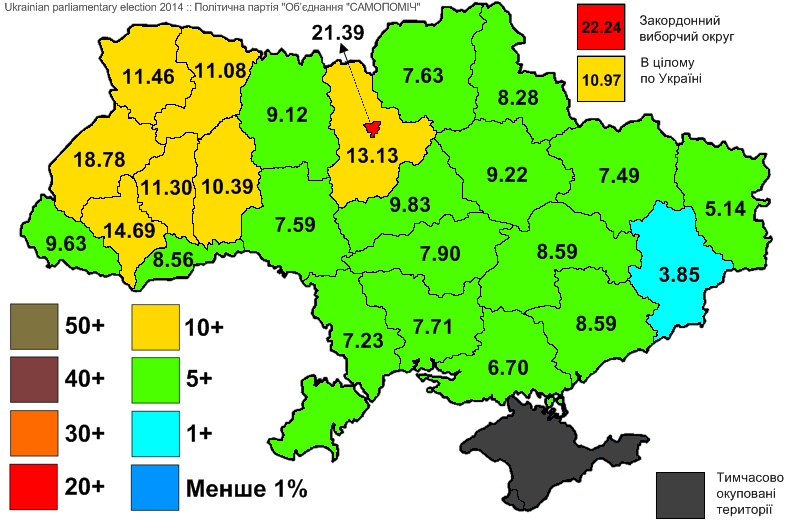
Party support (% of the votes cast) in different regions of Ukraine (in the 2014 election).

=== Verkhovna Rada ===
Year	Popular vote	% of popular vote	Overall seats won	Seat change	Government
2014	1,727,744	10.98	33 / 450	New	Coalition (2014−2016)
2014	1,727,744	10.98	33 / 450	New	Opposition (2016−2019)
2019	91,740	0.62	1 / 450	▼32	Opposition

=== Lviv Oblast Council ===
Year	Popular vote	% of popular vote	Overall seats won	Seat change
2015	155,337	14.77	14 / 84	New
2020	67,266	8.71	9 / 84	▼5

== See also ==
- Category:Self Reliance (political party) politicians
