= Oksana Syroyid =

Ukrainian politician and jurist

- Оксана Сироїд
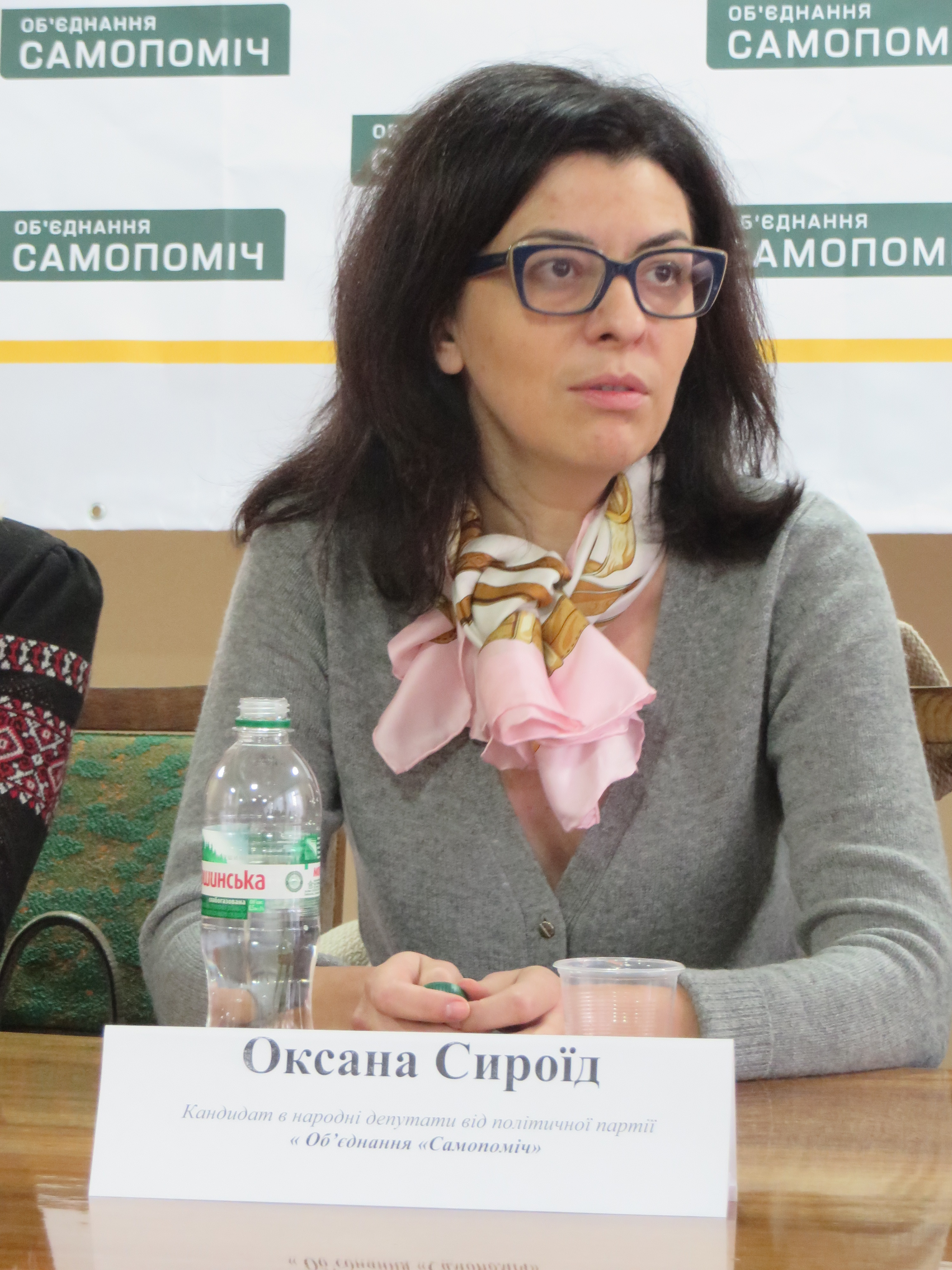
- Syroyid in October 2014

Deputy Chairwoman of the Verkhovna Rada
- In office November 27, 2014 – 29 August 2019
- Preceded by: Ruslan Koshulynskyi
- Succeeded by: Olena Kondratiuk

People's Deputy of Ukraine

8th convocation
- In office November 27, 2014 – 29 August 2019
- Constituency: Self Reliance, No.4

Personal details
- Born: May 2, 1976 (age 50) Horodyshche, Sokal Raion, Lviv Oblast, Ukrainian SSR
- Party: Self Reliance
- Website: w1.c1.rada.gov.ua/pls/site2/p_deputat_kerivnyk?d_id=3180

Oksana Ivanivna Syroyid (Ukrainian: Оксана Іванівна Сироїд, born May 2, 1976) is a Ukrainian politician and jurist. She was elected to the Verkhovna Rada in the 2014 Ukrainian parliamentary elections. In December 2014, she became the first woman to serve as the deputy speaker of the Ukrainian Parliament. Since October 2019 Syroyid is the party leader of Self Reliance.

Syroyid was the director of the Ukrainian Legal Foundation. Co-author of a number of bills that received positive opinions from the Council of Europe 's Commission for Democracy through Law (Venice Commission), including the draft law on amendments to the Law of Ukraine "On the Judiciary and the Status of Judges" (some provisions of the latter, however, were criticized by the [professional community]).

In the Russo-Ukrainian war she serves in der Chartija brigade of the ukraininan military forces. There she heads the communications department of the 2nd Corps as a Second Lieutenant.

== Early life and education ==
Oksana Syroyid was born in Horodyshche, a small village of Sokal Raion, Lviv Oblast. In 1993, she graduated from Chervonohrad school No.7. In 1993, she enrolled at the National University of Kyiv-Mohyla Academy and received a bachelor's degree in political science in 1997. In 1998, Syroyid began studying at Kyiv University's Center of Law Studies and graduated as a Master of Laws in 2000. In 2002, she moved to Canada to study at Ottawa University, receiving a Master of Laws degree in 2003.

== Career ==
In 1994, Syroyid became an assistant to Mykhailo Horyn and later worked for Ihor Yukhnovskyi. From 1997 to 2002, she was employed at various analytical organizations that monitored reforms in Ukraine, including the Interdepartment analytical consulting council on matters of development of production forces and producing relations (Cabinet of Ukraine), the United Nations Development Programme, and the Department for International Development.

While studying in Canada, Syroyid worked as an intern for the Gowlings law firm. From 2004 to 2012, she worked as a national manager for the OSCE Project Coordinator in Ukraine. In September 2012, she became the director of a charity fund, the Ukrainian Legal Foundation. Established in 1992 and sponsored by George Soros, the foundation works toward the reformation of the legal system in Ukraine.

During the 2014 Ukrainian parliamentary elections, Syroyid was elected to the Verkhovna Rada on the party list of Self Reliance. On December 4, 2014, she became the Deputy Chairwoman of the Verkhovna Rada.

Syroyid took again take part in the July 2019 Ukrainian parliamentary election for Self Reliance. But in the election they won 0.62% of the votes, while the election had a 5% election threshold, and thus she did not gain a parliamentary seat (the party won 1 seat (in one of the electoral constituencies)).

On 19 October 2019 Syroyid was elected the party leader of Self Reliance by its party congress.
