= Oleksandr Danchenko =

Ukrainian politician

- Олександр Данченко
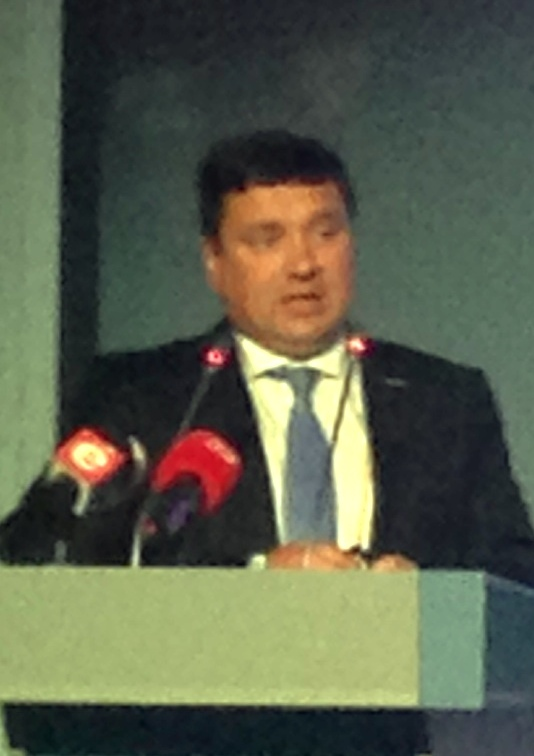

Member of Parliament
- In office 27 November 2014 – 29 August 2019

Personal details
- Born: 14 November 1974 (age 51) Kryvyi Rih, Dnipropetrovsk Oblast, Ukrainian SSR, Soviet Union
- Party: Self Reliance
- Spouse: Viktoriya Danchenko
- Children: Darya; Kateryna
- Education: Kyiv Politechnic University

Oleksandr Ivanovych Danchenko (Ukrainian: Олександр Іванович Данченко, born November 14, 1974) is a Ukrainian politician. He was elected to the Verkhovna Rada (Ukraine's parliament) in the October 2014 Ukrainian parliamentary election, appearing 10th on the party list of Self Reliance. Formerly the CEO of a telecom provider Data Group, in 2014-2019 headed the Parliamentary Committee for Informatization and Communications. He failed to win reelection in the 2019 Ukrainian parliamentary election.

== Early life ==
Born in Kryvyi Rih, Dnipropetrovsk Oblast, he attended school No. 108 in Kyiv, where he graduated with a silver medal. In 1997, he graduated from National Technical University of Ukraine 'Kyiv Polytechnic University', the faculty of Construction and Technology of Radio-electronic Devices. Later he received MBA degree from International Institute of Management in Kyiv (in 2007) and attended the Institute of Administrative Management (TEMIS) in Canada.

== Career in business ==
Danchenko started his career in 1995, obtaining the post of technical director in the company "UkrTraks". In 1998 became the CEO of the satellite communication company CTC.

Starting 2001 he was the CEO of the telecommunication company Datastat.

In 2005 created the national communication operator Datagroup by pooling together companies CTC, Datastat, Datacom, Krokus Telecom. He retained the post of Datagroup CEO until his election to the Parliament of Ukraine.

== Political career ==
Non-partisan and has not been elected to elected office. Ninth on the list of the Samopomich party in the 2014 parliamentary elections in Ukraine.

In the Verkhovna Rada of Ukraine from 2014 to 2019 he headed Parliamentary Committee for Informatization and Communications.

== Charity ==
Danchenko is a philanthropist and active supporter of sports for children and adults alike. He has been supporting the children's football team of the School #15, contributed to organisation of the Ukraine Football Cup and Ukraine Football Supercup, created the League of Mixed Martial Arts. Also, he is supporting small businesses, education and telemedicine (in collaboration with the charity 'Open Hearts').

== Awards ==
In 2004, Danchenko received the State Order "Honourable Communication Worker of Ukraine". In 2007 was distinguished as one of the three best CEOs in communications. In 2007 and 2008, the magazine "Economy" named him the best Top-manager in the fixed communications market.

== Personal life ==
Danchenko has a wife named Viktoriya with whom he has two daughters. He enjoys football, fishing, mixed martial arts and extreme sports.

== See Also ==
- Oleksandr Donets
- Kirill Dmitriev
