= Yevhen Rybchynskyi =

Ukrainian journalist and politician

Ievgen Rybchynskyi
- Євген Рибчинський
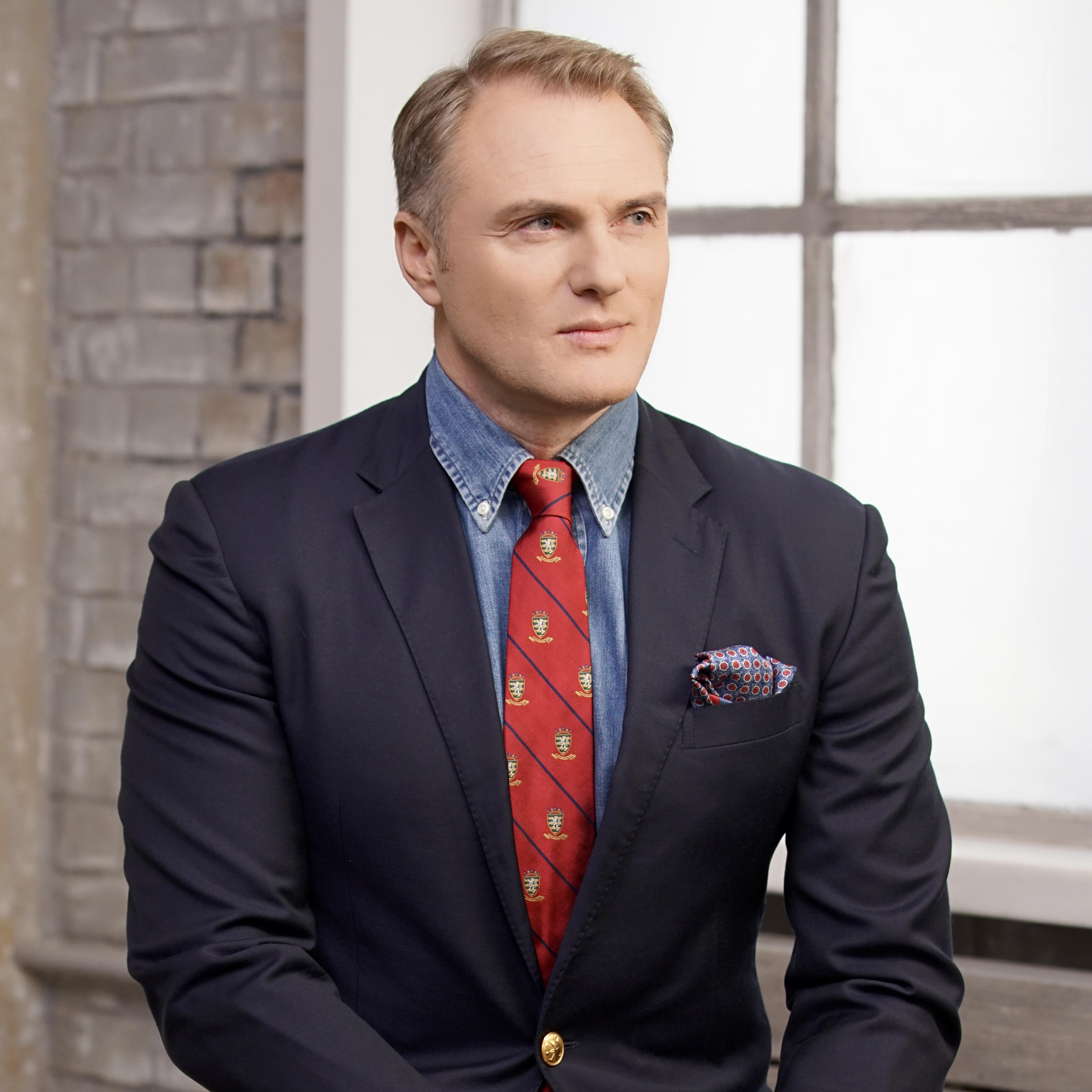
- Rybchynskyi in 2018

People's Deputy of Ukraine
- In office 27 November 2014 – 29 August 2019
- Preceded by: Constituency established
- Constituency: Holosiivskyi District, No. 211

Personal details
- Born: 21 December 1969 (age 56) Kyiv, Ukrainian SSR, Soviet Union (now Ukraine)
- Party: People's Will
- Children: 4
- Parent(s): Yuriy Rybchynskyi (father); Olexandra Rybchynska (mother)
- Education: Taras Shevchenko National University of Kyiv; Open University
- Occupation: Politician; poet; journalist
- Awards: see here

Ievgen Yuriiovych Rybchynskyi (Ukrainian: Євген Юрійович Рибчинський; born 21 December 1969) is a Ukrainian poet, composer, journalist and politician who served as a People's Deputy of Ukraine in the 8th Ukrainian Verkhovna Rada.

== Education ==
1986 - 1991 – Taras Shevchenko National University of Kyiv, Faculty of Journalism (now Institute of Journalism) 1997-1998 - The Open University . Knows Ukrainian, Russian, English.

== Work activity ==
The career of a journalist started at the third course of the university at Gosteleradio of Ukraine firstly in programme «Blitz» of Radiostation «Molodaya Gvardia», then at UR-2 «Promin» at commercial radio show, game «Pan abo propav». In 1992 he created a company «MB Advertising». The basis of the company's activity became marketing, advertisement production and its placement, clients’ accounting: Oriflame, MTI, UMC, Helen Marlen Group and others. In 1993 he opened the recording studio «Music Exchange House». In 1997 he created and registers a project «Nashe Radio», the rights to which he gives to Andrey Volkov then. In 1999 he created «Radio Nostalgia» with a call sign «Radio Nostalgi». In a year the radio station has the first rating in Kyiv. Since 2003 a female magazine «Eva» has been published.

== Political activity ==
At unscheduled elections to the Verkhovna Rada on October 26, 2014, he was elected a people's deputy of Ukraine according to single-seat electoral district 211 (Holosiivskyi District, Kyiv). At Parliament he took the post of vice-chairman the Verkhovna Rada Committee on veterans’ matters, combat veteran, Anti-Terrorist Operation Zone participants and the disabled. From October 1, 2014, to November 2015 – he is a member of faction Petro Poroshenko Bloc "Solidarity". Since November, 2015 he has joined a deputy group "People’s Will".

A chairman of interfactional deputy group “Atlantic Movement”.

A member of the group interparliament tights with the US and Norway.

Intercession of the head of the Verkhovno-Radi Ukrayinsky for the rights of veterans, participants of the boyovi dіy, participants in the antiterrorist operation, and people with misconduct.

Member of the Interim Special Commission of the Verkhovna Rada of Ukraine on the verification of violations during a repeat voting at the elections of Kryvy Rih Mayor November 15, 2015.

Member of the Inter-Parliamentary Relations Group with the Kingdom of Norway.

Member of the Inter-Parliamentary Relations Group with the Republic of Peru.

Member of the Inter-Parliamentary Relations Group with the State of Israel.

Member of the Inter-Parliamentary Relations Unit with the United States of America.

He is a co-author of the Law on ensuring the right of a significant part of the population of Ukraine to celebrate the Nativity of Christ on December 25, which corresponds to their religious and ideological convictions and recognition on December 25 as the official holiday in Ukraine. Is the initiator and one of the co-authors of the law on the effective management of the property rights of copyright holders in the field of copyright and related rights.

== Public activity ==
In 1996 he initiated a great action The Way to the Church, as a result of which Uspensky Cathedral was built. Over $200 000 was collected. He was a member of the Orange Revolution (2004) and the Revolution of Dignity (2014) in Ukraine. He was an organizer of multiple charity actions to help the members and the families of the killed in Anti-Terrorist Operation Zone.

== Poetry ==
An author of poetic collection «I am a mirror», «Folio» Publishing, Kharkiv, 2014. The author of words and music of such songs as:

- «Just Taya», «This raid will last long», «Thistle», «Do not ask me why», «It will be so» and others for Taisia Povaliy
- «Kharam-Buru» for Lolita Milyavskaya,
- «Thistle» for Alexander Malinin
- «The Ball of the Divorced Hearts» for Sofia Rotaru
- «You are Mine» for Oleksandr Ponomariov
- «Авжеж» for Natalia Mohylevska
- «Forever, for years» for Garik Krichevskiy
- «Nobody’s» and others for El Kravchuk

== Family ==
- Father — Yuriy Rybchynskyi (1945), Ukrainian poet, songwriter and playwright who is a recipient of both the Hero of Ukraine and People's Artist of Ukraine. Interestingly, he was among the pioneers of contemporary Ukrainian pop music. Between 1998 and 2000, he served as the President of Ukraine's Cultural Advisor.
- Mother — Olexandra Rybchynska (1948) is a couch in artistic gymnastics.
- Sons: Mykyta (1989), Danylo (2003), George (2011) and Evan (2014).

== Awards and honours ==
In 2010 he became a prize winner of all-Ukrainian award «The Person of the Year — 2009» as a founder of the best Ukrainian magazine «Eva».
