= Oleksandr Kovalov =

Ukrainian politician

- Олександр Ковальов
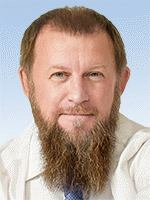
- Official portrait, 2019

People's Deputy of Ukraine
- Incumbent
- Assumed office 29 August 2019
- Preceded by: Anatoliy Honcharov (2012–2014) (Note: Constituency under partial occupation of the Donetsk People's Republic, no election held in 2014.)
- Constituency: Donetsk Oblast, No. 51

Personal details
- Born: 7 October 1967 (age 58) Makiivka, Ukrainian SSR, Soviet Union (now Ukraine)
- Party: Restoration of Ukraine (since 2022)
- Other political affiliations: Independent (before 2022)

Military service
- Allegiance: Soviet Union
- Battles/wars: Soviet–Afghan War

Oleksandr Ivanovych Kovalov (Ukrainian: Олександр Іванович Ковальов; born 7 October 1967) is a Ukrainian former soldier and politician currently serving as a People's Deputy of Ukraine from Ukraine's 51st electoral district since 29 August 2019. A veteran of the Soviet–Afghan War, Kovalov was a leader of protests against attempts by the government of Viktor Yanukovych to eliminate pensions of veterans and Chernobyl liquidators before later allegedly supporting the Anti-Maidan movement and assisting in the flight of Berkut members from Ukraine. He currently holds the record for the fewest votes received by a successful People's Deputy candidate, having received only 220 votes in his 2019 election.

== Early life and career ==
Oleksandr Ivanovych Kovalov was born on 7 October 1967 in Makiivka in Donetsk Oblast within the Ukrainian Soviet Socialist Republic. He served in the Soviet–Afghan War as a paratrooper, and achieved higher education.

== Afghanistan veteran leadership ==
Kovalov has been described by various sources, including newspaper Ukrainska Pravda, as a leader of Ukrainian veterans of the Soviet–Afghan War. He is leader of the "Nobody But Us" (Ukrainian: «Ніхто крім нас», romanized: «Nikhto krim nas») organisation, representing veterans, and has publicly lobbied for the financial benefits of veterans to be maintained.

=== 2011–2012 veterans' protests ===
In 2011, Kovalov was a leading organiser of the 20 September "Afganets riot", in which Afghanistan veterans and Chernobyl liquidators protesting the 2011 Ukrainian pension reform breached the perimeter of the Verkhovna Rada building, as well as subsequent protests.

On a commemoration of the anniversary of withdrawal of Soviet troops from Afghanistan on 15 February 2012, President Viktor Yanukovych was present at a ceremony. Upon Yanukovych's appearance at the commemoration, veterans affiliated with "Nobody But Us" turned away from him, in protest to the curtailing of benefits by Yanukovych's government. The event was met with criticism from other veterans' organisations, with head of the Ukrainian Union of Afghan Veterans Serhiy Chervonopyskyi accusing the organisers of being linked to politician Natalia Korolevska. Prime Minister Mykola Azarov also spoke strongly against the activists responsible, accusing "provocateurs" of turning Afghanistan veterans against the government.

Following the incident, Kovalov claimed he was being targeted by the Ukrainian authorities, stating that tax officials had conducted a search of his offices and that the Ministry of Internal Affairs had asked him to leave the country. The Ministry of Internal Affairs and the denied the claims, issuing a statement saying, "All of Kovalov's statements are untrue and lies."

In 2012, following another proposal by First Vice Prime Minister Serhiy Tihipko to cut the benefits of Afghanistan veterans, Kovalov staged protests outside the Verkhovna Rada building, accusing Tihipko of being "a pinnacle of hypocrisy and cynicism," for his claims that there were Afghanistan veterans receiving benefits while having incomes above ₴10,000 per family member.

=== Support for Anti-Maidan and Berkut ===
The role of Kovalov and "Nobody But Us" during Euromaidan and the Revolution of Dignity has been disputed. In the aftermath of the Revolution of Dignity, "Nobody But Us" claimed that they had supported protesters. However, others, including within the organisation, have disputed this, saying that Kovalov was a supporter of Anti-Maidan and a supporter of the Titushky. Kovalov has additionally been accused of facilitating the escape of members of the Berkut from Ukraine, as well as hiding evidence of the killing of protesters by the Berkut. He has denied explicitly supporting the Berkut or working alongside the Ministry of Internal Affairs, saying, "At that time, in 2014, we really helped everyone who turned to us, on both sides." He has, however, admitted to assisting in the escape of Berkut members, stating he did it out of a desire to prevent violence in Kyiv.

In 2016, it was revealed by Volodymyr Ariev that Kovalov had been photographed outside the Donetsk Oblast State Administration building following the capture of Donetsk by militants of the Donetsk People's Republic. Kovalov additionally received attention for his support for the killing of Oleh Mikhniuk during the war in Donbas, as well as spreading Russian propaganda involving the incident.

== Political career ==
In the 2006 Ukrainian parliamentary election, Kovalov was an unsuccessful candidate for People's Deputy of Ukraine, running as a member of the Eco+25% Ecological Protection Party (Ukrainian: Партія екологічного порятунку "Еко+25%", romanized: Partiia ekolohichnoho poriatunku "Eko+25%"). In the 2019 Ukrainian parliamentary election, Kovalov ran as a People's Deputy of Ukraine from Ukraine's 51st electoral district as an independent. Among his opponents was Nadiya Savchenko, a former People's Deputy who had been arrested in 2018 on suspicion of planning terrorist attacks against the Ukrainian government.

Kovalov was successful in his election campaign, winning 33.03% of the vote. Kovalov's election was notable, as he received only 220 votes, the record for the lowest number ever received by a successful candidate for People's Deputy. Following his victory, Volodymyr Vesolkin, head of the Zaitseve military administration and an opponent of Kovalov in the election, accused Kovalov of bribing voters by promising $100 to voters, as well as the distribution of bicycles and sneakers to children.

Kovalov's campaign achieved attention due to his assistance in the escape of Berkut members and alleged arming of Titushky. Among the proposals in his campaign were to repeal the law "On supporting the functioning of the Ukrainian language as the State language", to repeal of reforms to the medical system, and to "Restore respect for our true history, the victorious people and true heroes of the Great Patriotic War."

On 22 May 2022 Kovalov joined the newly formed parliamentary group Restoration of Ukraine.

=== 2019 piano voting incident ===
Kovalov acquired attention in office following the publishing of a video by anti-corruption campaign Chesno in which he was shown piano voting both for himself and for Maksym Yefimov. Although he originally denied doing so, Kovalov later admitted to partaking in piano voting, saying, "If we are already fighting for the Constitution, we should be fighting harder."
