= Stolar =

Stolar is an occupational surname which means carpenter, joiner in some Slavic languages. Notable people with the surname include:

- Bernie Stolar (1946–2022), American businessman
- Martin Stolar (1943–2024), American attorney and civil rights activist
- Vadym Stolar, Ukrainian businessman and politician
