= Yevheniy Shevchenko =

Yevheniy Shevchenko may refer to:

- Yevheniy Shevchenko (footballer)
- Yevheniy Shevchenko (politician)
