= Voronko =

Voronko (Ukrainian: Воронько, Voron'ko) is a Ukrainian surname. Notable people with the surname include:

- Oleh Voronko (born 1974), Ukrainian politician
- Platon Voronko (1913-1988), Ukrainian poet and war veteran
- Roman Voronko (born 1978), Ukrainian sprinter
