= Plachkov =

Plachkov (Bulgarian: Плачков, feminine: Plachkova) is a Bulgarian surname. People with the surname include:

- Ivan Plachkov (born 1957), Ukrainian politician
- Tetiana Plachkova (born 1983), Ukrainian politician
