= Valerii Hnatenko =

Ukrainian entrepreneur and politician

- Валерій Гнатенко
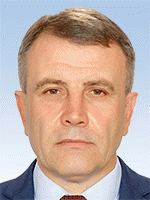
- Official portrait, 2019

People's Deputy of Ukraine
- Incumbent
- Assumed office 29 August 2019
- Preceded by: Denys Omelianovych
- Constituency: Donetsk Oblast, No. 49

Personal details
- Born: 3 February 1967 (age 59) Druzhkivka, Ukrainian SSR, Soviet Union (now Ukraine)
- Party: Restoration of Ukraine
- Other political affiliations: Opposition Platform — For Life (until 2022)
- Education: Yaroslav Mudryi National Law University

Valerii Serhiiovych Hnatenko (Ukrainian: Валерій Сергійович Гнатенко; born 3 February 1967) is a Ukrainian politician currently serving as a People's Deputy of Ukraine in the 9th Ukrainian Verkhovna Rada (parliament). Hnatenko is people's deputy for Ukraine's 49th electoral district, representing the city of Druzhkivka. He was previously mayor of Druzhkivka.

== Early life and career ==
In 1993, he graduated from Yaroslav Mudryi National Law University with a specialisation in law. In 1999, he graduated from the Donbas State Engineering Academy, specialising in finance.

Hnatenko worked as criminal intelligence investigator in the Economic Crimes Department of Druzhkivka's Town Department of Ministry of Internal Affairs (Ukraine). From 1996 to 2006, he was head of the Tax Inspection Police in Druzhkivka, Kostiantynivka, and the head of Kramatorsk Tax Inspection Department. In 2010, he became head of Tax Inspection Police of the State Tax Inspection Administration in Zaporizhzhia Oblast.

== Political career ==
From 26 March 2006 to 29 August 2019, he was mayor of Druzhkivka. During his tenure, Hnatenko achieved notoriety for his early support of the Donetsk People's Republic, and gave a speech in support of the 2014 Donbas status referendums. According to local activists, Hnatenko cooperated with separatist forces and raised the flag of Russia over the city in 2014. When asked about his position on the 2014 pro-Russian unrest in 2018, Hnatenko confronted reporters, accusing them of aggression and shoving a cameraman.

=== Parliamentary activity ===
on 29 August 2019, Valerii Hnatenko took the oath as a People's Deputy of Ukraine, following his election to the Verkhovna Rada as People's Deputy of Ukraine's 49th electoral district, representing Druzhkivka. Hnatenko is a member of the Committee of the Verkhovna Rada on issues of budget, a member of the crossparliamentary group with the United States, and a member of the crossparliamentary group with Italy.

In 2022, following the banning of the Opposition Platform — For Life during the Russian invasion of Ukraine, Hnatenko was one of the founding members of the Restoration of Ukraine party.

== Honours and titles ==
- Doctorate in the sphere of Business Administration
- He has the title of a colonel of the Tax Inspection Police
- The order of Danylo Khalytskyii
- The Order of Saint Vladimir
- Diploma of the Verkhovna Rada of Ukraine
- The Order of Ukrainian Cossacks
- Numerous Certificates of Appriciation of Donetsk Oblast State Administration
