= Antonina Slavytska =

Ukrainian politician (born 1988)

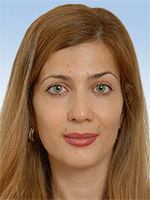
- Slavytska in 2019

Member of the Verkhovna Rada
- Incumbent
- Assumed office 29 August 2019

Personal details
- Born: 30 April 1988 (age 37)
- Party: Independent (since 2022)
- Other political affiliations: VU (since 2022); OPZZh (until 2022)

Antonina Kerymivna Slavytska (Ukrainian: Антоніна Керимівна Славицька; born 30 April 1988) is a Ukrainian politician serving as a member of the Verkhovna Rada since 2019. She has served as co-chair of the Restoration of Ukraine since 2023.

== Early life ==
Slavytska was born on 30 April 1988. From 2003 to 2008, she studied at National University Odesa Law Academy, where she graduated with a degree in jurisprudence and the qualification of Master of Law. While studying, from 2003, she was an assistant to the Party of Regions MP Serhiy Kivalov. She then pursued higher education and in 2011 defended her PhD on administrative and legal principles for conflict resolution in the activities of executive authorities, her supervisor for the thesis was Kivalov.

In 2016, she received her certificate of the right to practice law by the Kyiv City Bar Council, this right was suspended in 2019. In 2017, she became an entrepreneur.

== Political career ==
In 2019 Slavytska became a Member of Parliament of the Verkhovna Rada for electoral district No. 37. At the time of her election she was the founder of the law firm "Slavytska and Partners".

== Personal life ==
Although Slavytska has never confirmed a relationship with anyone, she was suspected of having a relationship with the judge Pavlo Vovk and that they had a child together, although the father has not been confirmed. Slavytska has declared a child in her declarations, but has not declared his patronymic name. Her and Vovk have been regular acquaintances, and she appeared in the NABU tapes where she supported his attempts to declare unconstitutional certain activities of the National Anti-Corruption Bureau of Ukraine.
