= Restoration of Ukraine =

Restoration of Ukraine Відновлення України
- Abbreviation: VU
- Chairperson: Antonina Slavytska
- Founders: Ihor Abramovych; Maxim Efimov
- Founded: 22 May 2022
- Split from: Opposition Platform — For Life; Servant of the People; Dovira
- Verkhovna Rada: 17 / 450

Website
- Facebook page

Restoration of Ukraine, also translated as Repair of Ukraine, (Ukrainian: Відновлення України, romanized: Vidnovlennya Ukrayiny, pronounced [widˈnɔu̯lenʲːɐ ʊkrɐˈjinɪ]) is a parliamentary group in the Verkhovna Rada of Ukraine, founded on 22 May 2022. The chairwoman of the group is Antonina Slavytska. As of December 2024, the group consists of 15 deputies.

== History ==
The parliamentary group was founded on 22 May 2022, this was announced by the People's Deputy Yaroslav Zheleznyak in his Telegram channel.

In August 2022, the parliamentary group had 18 deputies: most of them moved from the Opposition Platform — For Life, some also from the Servant of the People and Dovira. On 21 September 2022, former Servant of the People deputy Yevheniy Shevchenko joined the parliamentary group.

On 6 February 2023, Ihor Abramovych, co-chairman of the group, wrote a resignation letter. On the same day, the Rada voted in support of his resignation, thus making Yefimov the sole chairman of the group. On 1 December, Yefimov announced his resignation as deputy, citing his "affairs to focus on protecting the native Kramatorsk community". He was replaced by Antonina Slavytska as the chairwoman of the parliamentary group, thus lowering the amount of deputies in the group to just 16, meaning the group can be dissolved, as the number of the members in the group is lower than the needed threshold according to the law (17 deputies this convocation, when Holos was formed in August 2019).

== List of deputies ==
Among those who joined the group "Revival of Ukraine" are:

- Igor Abramovych ("OPZZH"; left in 2023)
- Anatoliy Burmich ("OPZZH")
- Valerii Hnatenko ("OPZZH")
- Dmytro Isaienko ("OPZZH")
- Ihor Kisilyov ("OPZZH")
- Oleksandr Lukashev ("OPZZH")
- Volodymyr Moroz ("OPZZH"; died in 2025)
- Tetiana Plachkova ("OPZZH")
- Natalia Prykhodko ("OPZZH")
- Antonina Slavytska ("OPZZH")
- Vadym Stolar ("OPZZH")
- Oleksandr Feldman ("OPZZH")
- Maxim Efimov ("Dovira"; left in 2023)
- Oleksandr Kovalov ("Dovira")
- Oleh Voronko (non-factional)
- Artem Dmytruk (non-factional)
- Olexandr Yurchenko (non-factional)

== See also ==
- Platform for Life and Peace
