= Maxim Efimov =

Ukrainian politician

- Максим Єфімов
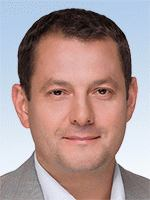
- Official portrait, 2019

People's Deputy of Ukraine
- In office 27 November 2014 – 8 December 2023
- Preceded by: Yuriy Boyarskyi
- Constituency: Donetsk Oblast, No. 48

Personal details
- Born: 1 November 1974 (age 51) Petropavlovsk, Kazakh SSR, Soviet Union (now Petropavl, Kazakhstan)
- Party: Restoration of Ukraine (since 2022)
- Other political affiliations: Party of Regions (until 2014); Petro Poroshenko Bloc (2014–2019); Independent (2019–2022)
- Education: University of Bern; Donetsk National University; Donetsk National Technical University

Maxim Viktorovich Efimov (Ukrainian: Максим Вікторович Єфімов, romanized: Maksym Viktorovych Yefimov; born 1 November 1974) is a Ukrainian politician and former People's Deputy of Ukraine from Ukraine's 48th electoral district from 2014 to December 2023. Formerly an independent and member of the Petro Poroshenko Bloc, and following this co-chair of Restoration of Ukraine alongside Igor Abramovych.

== Early life and career ==
Maxim Viktorovich Efimov was born on 1 November 1974 in the city of Petropavlovsk in the northern Kazakh Soviet Socialist Republic (now Petropavl in Kazakhstan). He is a graduate of the University of Bern's Department of Business Administration, the Donetsk National University (specialising in economics) and the Donetsk National Technical University (with a degree in ferrous metallurgy).

Efimov began working in 1996, as general director of the Kramatorsk Metallurgical and Machine-Building Company. From 1997 to 1998, he worked at Kramatorsk Multi-Industry Marketing Company before moving to Kramatorsk Aeronautical School, where he remained for a year before moving to the EnerhoMashSpetsStal plant in Kramatorsk. In 2006 or 2007, Efimov was appointed as head of EnerhoMashSpetsStal.

== Political career ==
Efimov was first elected to a political position in the 2006 Ukrainian local elections, being elected to the Kramatorsk City Council as a member of Party of Regions. He was subsequently re-elected in the 2010 Ukrainian local elections, before leaving the Party of Regions on 25 August 2014.

In the 2014 Ukrainian parliamentary election, Efimov was elected as a People's Deputy of Ukraine from Ukraine's 48th electoral district (located in Kramatorsk), campaigning as an independent. He defeated incumbent People's Deputy Yuriy Boyarskyi with 34.12% of the vote to Boyarskyi's 31.15%. In the Verkhovna Rada (Ukraine's parliament), Efimov joined the Petro Poroshenko Bloc faction, and was first deputy chair of the Verkhovna Rada Committee on Industrial Policy and Entrepreneurship.

In the 2015 Ukrainian local elections, Efimov ran to be mayor of Kramatorsk as the candidate of Our Land (though he was not a member of the party), but was unsuccessful after making it to the second round.

Efimov ran again in the 2019 Ukrainian parliamentary election as an independent in the 48th electoral district, and was again successfully elected, defeating independent candidate Denys Oshurko with 54.88% of the vote to Oshurko's 19.09%. In the Verkhovna Rada, he joined Dovira, and became a member of the Verkhovna Rada Human Rights Committee, the Verkhovna Rada Committee on the De-occupation and Reintegration of Temporarily Occupied Territories, the Verkhovna Rada Committee on National Minorities, and the Verkhovna Rada International Relations Committee.

On 22 May 2022, Efimov, alongside 16 other People's Deputies, participated in the founding of the Restoration of Ukraine parliamentary group. Efimov, along with Igor Abramovych, was declared co-chairman of the parliamentary group.

On 1 December 2023, Efimov announced he had decided to withdraw his powers as a people's deputy. he stated he did so to help solving the needs of the Kramatorsk region that had been that had been significantly hit by the Russian army in the Russian invasion of Ukraine. On 8 December 2023 parliament officially terminated his parliamentary mandate.
