= Vitalii Kurylo =

Ukrainian scientist and politician

- Віталій Курило
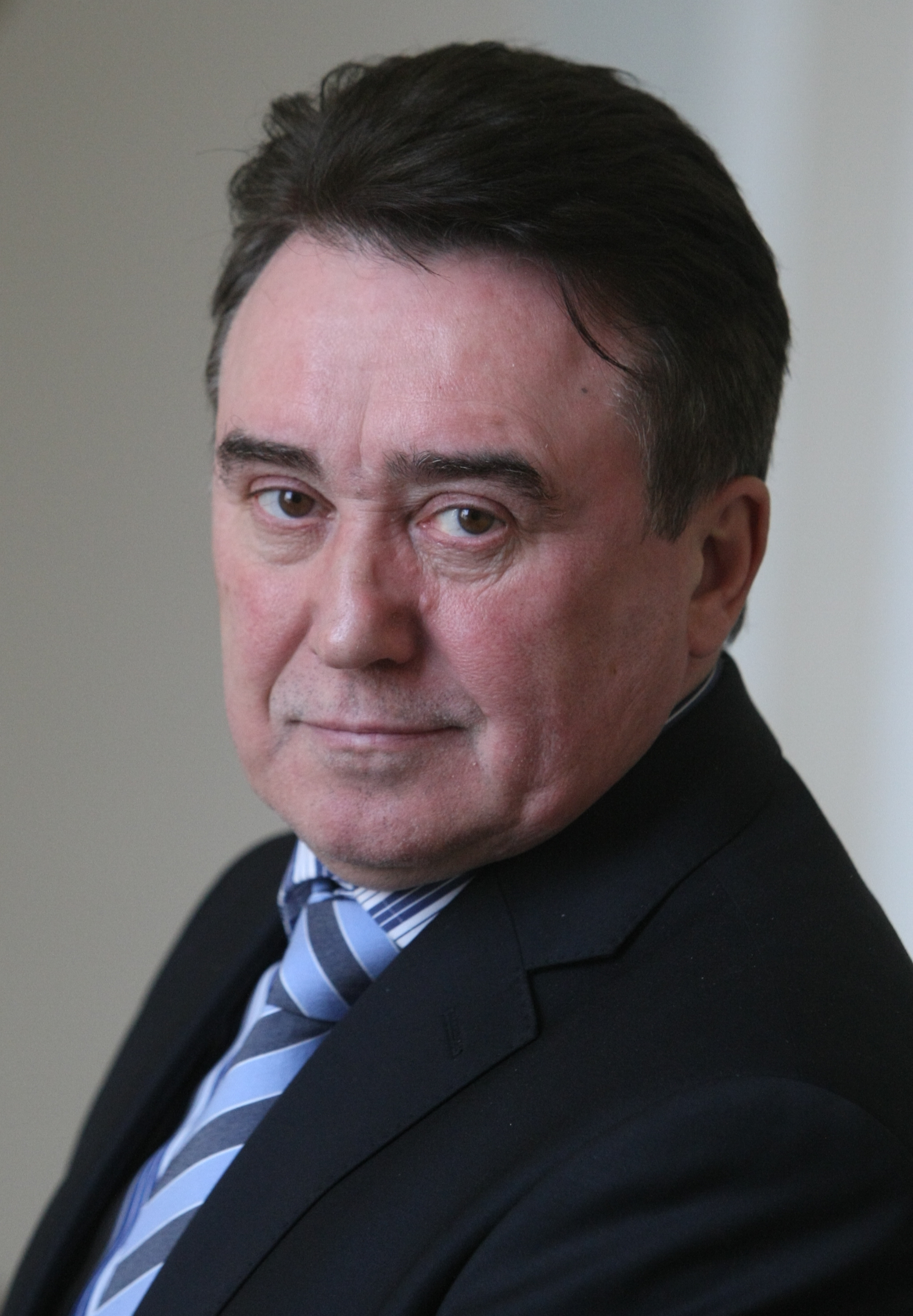

People's Deputy of Ukraine
- In office 27 November 2014 – 29 August 2019
- Preceded by: Viktor Tikhonov
- Succeeded by: Oleksandr Lukashev
- Constituency: Luhansk Oblast, No. 113
- In office 25 May 2006 – 12 December 2012
- Constituency: Yulia Tymoshenko Bloc, No. 8

Personal details
- Born: 2 February 1957 (age 69) Bilokurakyne, Ukrainian SSR, Soviet Union (now Ukraine)
- Party: Independent
- Other political affiliations: Petro Poroshenko Bloc; Yulia Tymoshenko Bloc
- Spouse: Natalia Oleksandrovna
- Children: 4

Vitalii Semenovych Kurylo (Ukrainian: Віта́лій Семе́нович Кури́ло; born 2 February 1957) is a Ukrainian scientist and politician who formerly served as a People's Deputy of Ukraine from 2006 to 2012 and from 2014 to 2019. The first time, he served eighth on the party list of the Yulia Tymoshenko Bloc, while the second time he represented Ukraine's 113th electoral district as an independent member of the Petro Poroshenko Bloc.

== Early life and educational career ==
Vitalii Semenovych Kurylo was born on 2 February 1957 in the settlement of Bilokurakyne, in Ukraine's eastern Luhansk Oblast to Semen Yevhrafovych Kurylo (born 1929) and Anastasiia Arsentiyivna Kurylo (born 1930). He is married and has four children: two sons and two daughters. He graduated from the Historical Faculty of Luhansk Taras Shevchenko State Pedagogical Institute in 1982, and in 1974 began his career as a teacher at Bilokurakyne Secondary School. He worked as a teacher in Pidhorivka Secondary School and Starobilsk Secondary School No. 3.

From 1983 to 1986, he studied at postgraduate school. At the same time, he worked as an assistant, associate professor, and vice-rector at Luhansk Pedagogical Institute. In 1987, he defended his dissertation on history. From 1996 to 1997, he was head of the Main Department of Education and Science of the Luhansk Oblast State Administration. In July 1997, he became rector of Luhansk Taras Shevchenko State Pedagogical Institute. Under his rectorship, the institute became a classic national university. In 2000, Kurylo defended his doctoral dissertation on the history of teaching, with the topic of "The Formation and Development of Education and Pedagogical Thought of Eastern Ukraine in the Twentieth Century."

From 2006 to 2012, he was president of University of Luhansk. Afterwards, he was the rector of the same university until 2014. From April 2021, he was the Acting Rector, Chairman of the Academic Council of the University. Kurylo currently heads the expert council at the Ministry of Education and Science of Ukraine for the defence of dissertations in pedagogical sciences and physical education and sports.

== Political career ==
Kurylo was first elected as a People's Deputy of Ukraine in the 2006 Ukrainian parliamentary election. In the 2007 Ukrainian parliamentary election, he was re-elected. He was again re-elected in the 2014 Ukrainian parliamentary election. He was Deputy Chairman of the Committee on Science and Education in the V-VI convocation and Deputy Chairman of the Committee on State Building and Local Self-Government in the VIII convocation.

Kurylo is the author and co-author of more than 100 bills, a significant part of which became the laws of Ukraine. These are, first of all, the laws on education, such as the 2017 Law of Ukraine "On Education", in the preparation of which Kurylo took an active part in a number of amendments to the Law on Higher Education, laws on local self-government, administrative-territorial organization, etc.

In the Verkhovna Rada (Ukraine's parliament), Kurylo headed the parliamentary group on interparliamentary relations with Albania, and was additionally co-chair of the group on relations with Greece, and deputy chairman of the group on relations with Japan. He was also the deputy chairman of the Eastern Partnership Group.

== Scientific works ==
In addition to his political activity, Kurylo is a recognised scientist in the field of pedagogical science and historical local lore. He is the author of more than 200 research papers. Kurylo's scientific school has 6 doctors and 15 candidates of science. The most famous of his scientific works include "The Formation and Development of Education and Pedagogical Thought of Eastern Ukraine in the Twentieth Century", "Pedagogical Philosophy", "The History of the Donbas", "The History of Luhansk Oblast", and "Luhansk Taras Shevchenko National University. Pages of History: (1921-2021)", among others. Some of the works were co-authored with V. Podov, B. Korotiaiev, S. Savchenko, and A. Klimov.

Kurylo is a member of the Presidium of the National Academy of Educational Sciences of Ukraine, the Executive Committee of the Volleyball Federation of Ukraine, the Presidium of the Znannia All-Ukrainian Society, the Luhansk branch of the National Union of Local Historians of Ukraine, and the National Academy of Educational Sciences of Ukraine.

== Awards ==
- Order of Merit (Ukraine) of II and III degrees
- Merited Education Worker of Ukraine(2001 р.)
- Diploma of the Verkhovna Rada of Ukraine
- Diploma of the Cabinet of Ministers of Ukraine
- Badge of MES of Ukraine "Excellence in Education of Ukraine"
- Breastplate "Petro Mohyla"
- Anniversary medal "10 years of Independence of Ukraine
