= Oleksandr Lukashev =

Ukrainian politician (born 1976)

- Олександр Лукашев
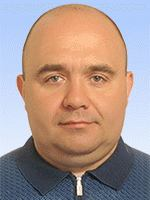
- Official portrait, 2019

People's Deputy of Ukraine
- Incumbent
- Assumed office 29 August 2019
- Preceded by: Vitalii Kurylo
- Constituency: Luhansk Oblast, No. 113

Personal details
- Born: 1 April 1976 (age 50) Antratsyt, Ukrainian SSR, Soviet Union (now Ukraine)
- Party: Restoration of Ukraine (since 2022)
- Other political affiliations: OPZZh (until 2022)

Oleksandr Anatoliyovych Lukashev (Ukrainian: Олександр Анатолійович Лукашев; born 1 April 1976) is a Ukrainian politician currently serving as a People's Deputy of Ukraine from Ukraine's 113th electoral district since 29 August 2019. He is currently a member of Restoration of Ukraine, having been a member of Opposition Platform — For Life until the party's ban in 2022.

== Early life and career ==
Oleksandr Anatoliyovych Lukashev was born on 1 April 1976 in the city of Antratsyt, in Ukraine's eastern Luhansk Oblast. He has higher education. He is a candidate of judicial sciences, and prior to his election, was a professor in the financial law department of Yaroslav Mudryi National Law University in Kharkiv. He was also head of the legal department of the Serhii Shakhov Foundation, a charitable organisation. From 2011 to 2017, he also served as a member of the scientific consulting council to the Supreme Court of Ukraine.

== Political career ==
Lukashev ran in the 2019 Ukrainian parliamentary election as the candidate of Opposition Platform — For Life (OPZZh) for People's Deputy of Ukraine in Ukraine's 113th electoral district. He was successfully elected with 33.66% of the vote, defeating 21 competitors including incumbent People's Deputy Vitalii Kurylo, who placed fourth with 7.92% of the vote. During his election, Lukashev acquired attention after bags of sugar with his name on them were distributed in Luhansk Oblast by the Serhii Shakhov Foundation.

In the Verkhovna Rada (Parliament of Ukraine), Lukashev joined the OPZZh parliamentary faction, and was chosen as first deputy chair of the Verkhovna Rada Committee on Education, Science, and Innovation. Following the ban on OPZZh after the beginning of the 2022 Russian invasion of Ukraine, Lukashev joined Restoration of Ukraine, a successor organisation to OPZZh. He also left his position as deputy chair of the Committee on Education, Science, and Innovation to join the Verkhovna Rada Committee on Finance, Taxation, and Customs Policy.

Lukashev was one of the 47 People's Deputies to launch an appeal to the Constitutional Court of Ukraine against electronic financial declarations in August 2020, leading to the Constitutional Court to declare mandatory electronic financial declarations for People's Deputies to be unconstitutional.

Prior to the Russian invasion of Ukraine, Lukashev was active in spreading Russian propaganda on Ukrainian news channels, on one occasion participating in a broadcast alongside Luhansk People's Republic politician Rodion Miroshnyk. Lukashev's appearance on Rada TV following the beginning of the invasion drew criticism from Ukrainian society, leading to the chief of Rada TV to promise to rectify mistakes.
