= Natalia Prykhodko =

Ukrainian politician (born 1981)

- Наталія Приходько
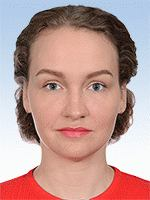

People's Deputy of Ukraine
- Incumbent
- Assumed office 29 August 2019

Personal details
- Born: 29 October 1981 (age 44) Lviv, Ukrainian SSR, Soviet Union (now Lviv, Ukraine)
- Party: Restoration of Ukraine (since 2022)
- Other political affiliations: Petro Poroshenko Bloc (2014–2019); Opposition Platform — For Life (2019–2022)

Natalia Ihorivna Prykhodko (Ukrainian: Наталія Ігорівна Приходько; born 29 October 1981) is a Ukrainian politician and who has been a People's Deputy, having been elected to the Verkhovna Rada in 2019.

== Early life and education ==
Prykhodko received higher education. She graduated from the National Academy of the State Tax Service of Ukraine, where she received a master's degree with honors (specialty "Jurisprudence").

== Career ==
Since 2004, Prykhodko has worked as a specialist legal consultant in a private company. From 2008 to 2010, she was the chief specialist of the department of legal analysis and examination of the executive body of the Kyiv City Council (KMDA). From 2010 to 2012, she was in the apparatus of the Verkhovna Rada. In 2014, she became been the deputy head of the administration — the head of the department of organizational and documentary support for the activities of the Mayor of Kyiv. She was also deputy of the Kyiv City Council representing the Petro Poroshenko Bloc and a member of the Commission on Regulations and Deputy Ethics.

Prykhodko was a candidate for People's Deputy from the Opposition Platform — For Life party in the 2019 Ukrainian parliamentary election, No. 26 on the list. At the time of the elections, she was temporarily not working. She lives in the city of Kyiv. As a deputy, Prykhodko is a member of the Committee of the Verkhovna Rada on the Rules of Procedure, deputy ethics and organization of the work of the Verkhovna Rada, and chairman of the subcommittee on the organization of the work of the Verkhovna Rada.

== Personal life ==
Prykhodko is married and has two children. In 2015, she declared that she was below the poverty line with an income of 20,000 hryvnias per year.
