= Denys Omelianovych =

Ukrainian politician and businessman (born 1977)

- Денис Омельянович
- Omelianovych in 2019.

People's Deputy of Ukraine
- In office 27 November 2014 – 29 August 2019
- Succeeded by: Denys Omelianovych
- Constituency: Donetsk Oblast, No. 49
- In office 12 December 2012 – 27 November 2014
- Constituency: Donetsk Oblast, No. 49
- In office 30 March 2010 – 12 December 2012
- Constituency: Party of Regions, No. 204 (party list)

Personal details
- Born: 17 July 1977 (age 49) Donetsk, Ukrainian SSR, Soviet Union
- Party: Party of Regions (2012-2014)
- Education: Donetsk National University of Economics and Trade named after M. Tugan-Baranovsky (1999)

Denys Serhiiovych Omelianovych (Ukrainian: Денис Сергійович Омельянович; born 17 July 1977) is a Ukrainian politician and businessman who served as a People's Deputy of Ukraine in the Verkhovna Rada from 2010 to 2019, representing mainly the Party of Regions. His constituency in parliament, No. 49, which mainly consisted of the city of Druzhkivka. As a businessman, he was also formerly the director of the confectionery company Konti Group and was also the director of the agricultural company APK-INVEST.

== Early life ==
Omelianovych was born on 17 July 1977 in the city of Donetsk, which was then part of the Ukrainian SSR in the Soviet Union. After graduating from secondary school, he worked as an economist of the II degree at the Department of Accounting for Limits and Delimitation of State Budget Revenues within the State Treasury Service of Ukraine in the Kyivskyi district of Donetsk. After a year, he left the bog to become a manager at the Konti Group in 1998. The following year, while still employed, he also graduated from the Donetsk National University of Economics and Trade named after M. Tugan-Baranovsky with a specialisation in the economics of enterprises. He was then promoted to Director of the Department of Material and Technical Support at the Konti Group in 2000, a position he held for four years.

== Business career ==
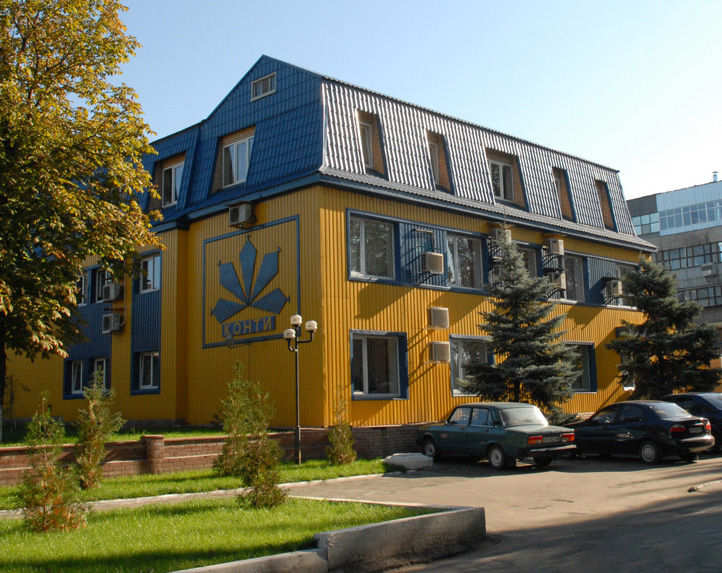
Konti Group's headquarters and main factory in Kostiantynivka.

APK's logo in 2017.

In 2000, he was appointed director of the Konti Group, a role he served in for four years until he was demoted back down to just production director of the group in 2004. After another two years, he accepted the position of general director APK-INVEST, an agricultural company also owned by Borys Kolesnikov. At least by 2014, he stepped down and was appointed honorary president of APK-INVEST, and he also became co-owner of the company "Revival of Donbas" with Kolesnikov, which publishes newspapers. During the 2014 parliament, Omelianovych registered a bill to provide benefits for agricultural businesses that were still located in the ATO, which was believed to be a response to some of the complexes of APK-INVEST being located in the zone.

=== Charity and sports ===
As director of APK-INVEST, in 2011, he helped install a new association football field in Pokrovsk called the "Field for Champions. It was confirmed that a competition called the "APK-INVEST Cup", which would be sponsored by APK-INVEST, was also intended to be held at the new field. Sometime later, he became co-director of the Borys Kolesnikov Charitable Foundation (Kolesnikov being also a people's deputy and the ultimate owner of APK-INVEST). The following year, in 2012, he was elected one of the vice-presidents of the HC Donbass hockey club, specifically within the realm of organisational issues. Kolesnikov also owns and was president of HC Donbass. As vice president, in 2012, it was said he was overseeing the construction of a new ice arena at School No. 6 in Druzhivka worth 36 million hryvnias.

== Political career ==
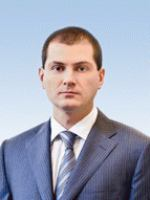
Omelianovych in an official portrait from 2012.

In 2006, Omelianovych first entered politics when he was successfully elected as a deputy to the Donetsk City Council with the Party of Regions. The following year, during the 2007 Ukrainian parliamentary elections, Omelianovych was included in the party list for the Party of Regions at No. 204 to the Verkhovna Rada, but he was initially too low to be selected, so he went back to the city council. However, he was able to enter the parliament in 2010 during a by-election because the deputies with the Party of Regions who entered the new government under Viktor Yanukovych had to give up their spot as a deputy due to Ukraine forbidding dual mandates. Upon joining the Rada, he immediately joined the faction of the Party of Regions in the parliament and was elected a member of the Committee on Agrarian Policy and Land Relations. He was also eventually elected Chairman of the Subcommittee on Land Relations within the committee. Just before the start of the election season during the 2012 Ukrainian parliamentary elections, it was alleged that constituency No. 49, which was created that year, was specifically created and curated for Omelianovych because he was active within it. It was confirmed that the constituency created would include the cities of Druzhkivka and Kostiantynivka (which Omelianovych was well-known in), alongside some parts of the Kostiantynivka Raion and Pokrovsk Raion. Just before the end of his term in the 6th convocation, he voted in line with his party "for" the On the Principles of State Language Policy, which expanded the use of regional languages in Ukraine, predominantly Russian.

In late July 2012, it was confirmed that Omelianovych would run for the Rada again, in constituency No. 49 as a majoritarian from the Party of Regions. His main opponents early on were Volodymyr Berezin of Batkivshchyna and Oleg Shipilov of Donbaspromkomplekt and UDAR, before Berezin eventually dropped out in favour of Shipilov. Berezin later said his withdrawal was not voluntary, and said he considered the Batkivshchyna's decision to withdraw him a "betrayal" and that he was previously the only real competition to the Party of Regions in the district, and that his withdrawal did not help UDAR and was instead helping the Party of Regions. After the drama, the head of the election headquarters for Batkivshchyna in Donetsk Oblast, Oleksandr Yaroshenko, urged voters not to vote for the UDAR candidate. This didn't matter much, though, as Omelianovych, likely previously projected, easily won re-election with 63.94% of the vote (52,061 people) against Yulia Gur of the Communist Party of Ukraine, who got 23.44% of the vote (19,084 people). The UDAR candidate only got 8.97% (7,310 people).

After re-joining the Rada, he again joined the Party of Regions faction and was also a member of the Committee on Agrarian Policy and Land Relations again. During this term, though, he was frequently accused of absenteeism and having other Party of Regions deputies piano vote for him. In 2013, texts were leaked between him and Oleksandr Klymenko, the then Minister of Revenue and Duties, where he said that "our group will support all the issues of interest to you". After the start of the War in the Donbas, most of Omelianovych's constituency came under the control of the pro-Russian, separatist Donetsk People's Republic (DPR) during the War in the Donbas, but they were eventually liberated in the summer of 2014. In mid-August 2014, Omelianovych posted an appeal that he intended to leave the Party of Regions, saying he did not understand what the party was doing and criticizing the party's policy of silence about the problems in the regions and its lack of a clear position on the events in the country. However, just a day later, he eventually changed his mind and decided to retract his appeal, and he tried to negotiate with the local newspaper of Kostiantynivka. This led to the newspaper offering to sell the appeal for at least a million hryvnias, which was successful as his assistants bought up most of the newspaper's circulation, but it still leaked. Omelianovych would remain a member of the Party of Regions for the rest of the convocation, even after it broke apart when Yanukovych fled to Russia.

Despite the ongoing war, Omelianovych chose to run for re-election in the snap 2014 Ukrainian parliamentary elections because his constituency had been mostly liberated. He ran this time with the Opposition Bloc, and in exit polls, it was predicted he would win again but this time with a slightly narrower lead, with the Petro Poroshenko Bloc and CPU gaining on him. Due to low voter turnout in the constituency, he was elected with just 27.35% of the vote (10,376 people) ahead of the self-nominated candidates Valeriy Panasovsky and Oleg Shevvchenko, who won 15.41% and 10.37%, respectively. After this, allegations came forth by OPORA that there were constant electoral problems in his district, alongside a suspiciously high voter turnout at certain polling stations and a large number of updated protocols from the PECs, although nothing came of these accusations. After rejoining the Rada, he again became a member of the faction of the Opposition Bloc and was once again on the Committee on Agrarian Policy and Land Relations. In 2016, he was rated towards the bottom by OPORA in terms of politician ratings in Druzhivka due to his inactivity. He was again mostly absent from parliament. He did not run again in the 2019 Ukrainian parliamentary elections.

== Personal life ==
Omelianovych is married and has a son and daughter. He did not indicate in his declarations 20 plots of land he owned in Donetsk Oblast, which NACP was said to be worth 16 million hryvnias, nor two apartments and vehicles. He was among the list of richest Ukrainians in 2007.

== Honours and awards ==
Omelianovych has been awarded the following honours:

- Honoured Worker of the Industry of Ukraine
