= Oleh Mikhniuk =

Ukrainian military figure (1965–2014)

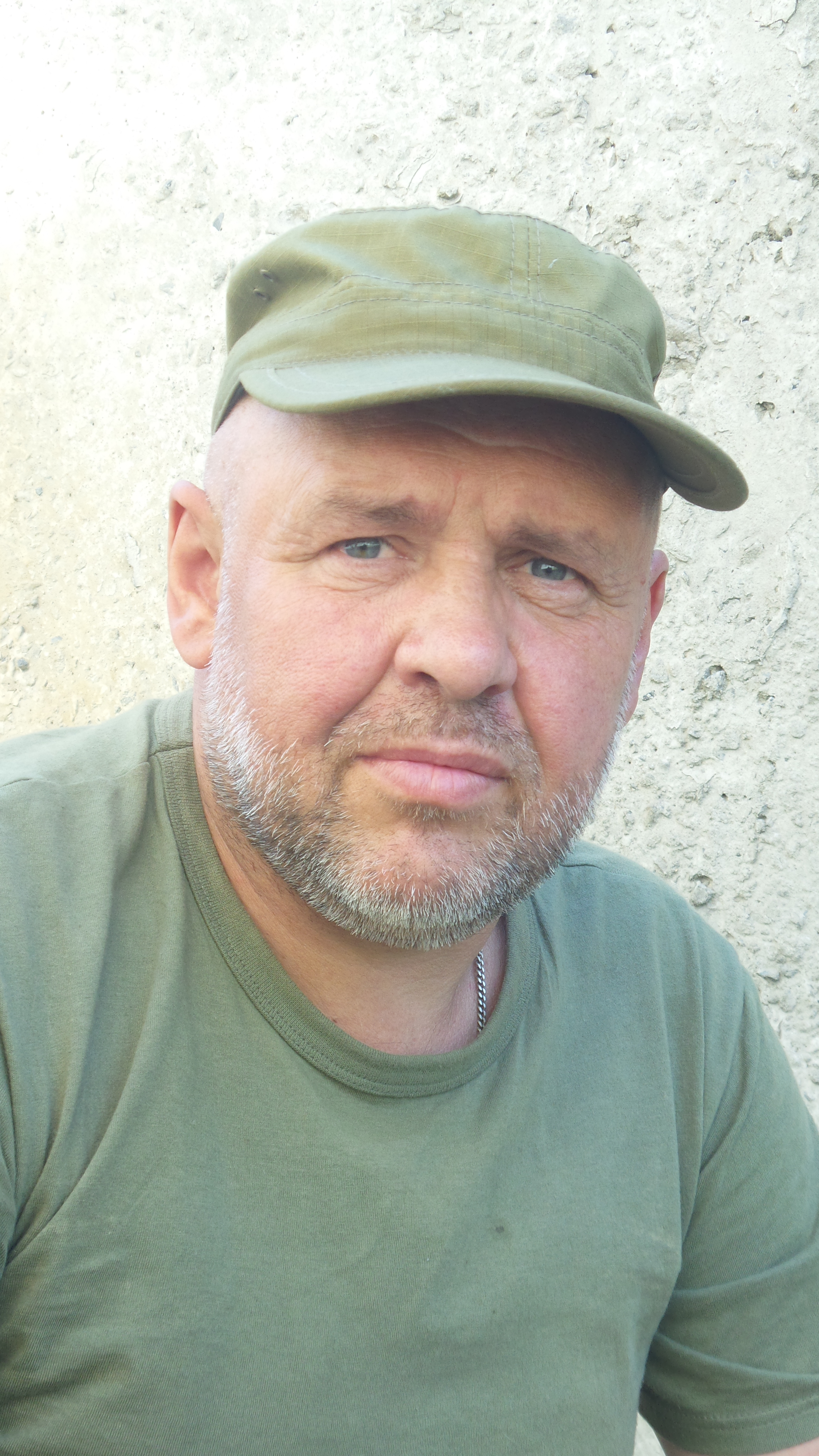
- Born: 27 October 1965; Mala Divytsia, Chernihiv Oblast, Ukrainian SSR, USSR
- Died: 20 August 2014 (aged 48); Novosvitlivka, Luhansk Oblast, Ukraine
- Military career
- Allegiance: Soviet Union; Ukraine
- Branch: Soviet Army; Ukrainian Ground Forces
- Rank: Senior sergeant
- Units: 56th Guards Air Assault Brigade; Aidar Battalion
- Conflicts: Soviet-Afghan War: Russo-Ukrainian War; War in Donbas †
- Awards: Order of the Gold Star

Oleh Mikhniuk (Ukrainian, Міхнюк Олег Іванович, 27 October 1965 – 20 August 2014) was a Ukrainian activist and soldier.

== Biography ==
He served in the armed forces of the Soviet Union during the Soviet–Afghan War. From 1991 to 1993 Mikhniuk was the head of the medical and social department of the Ukrainian Union of Afghanistan Veterans (USVA).

He participated in the Euromaidan and was a chief of the 8th "Afghan" Sotnia of the Maidan Self-Defense, which consisted mainly of veterans of the Soviet war in Afghanistan.

He was killed in action fighting against the rebel forces in the Donbas.

== Awards ==
- On August 21, 2015, he was posthumously made a Hero of Ukraine.
- Order for Courage 1st class (August 21, 2014, posthumously).
- Order for Courage 2nd class (February 11, 2004).
- Order for Courage 3rd class (February 15, 1999).

== See also ==
- List of heroes of Ukraine
- List of people from Ukraine
