= Konti Group =

Ukrainian confectionary company

CJSC "KONTI" PA
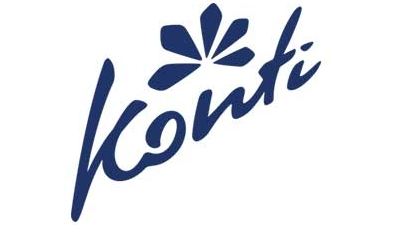
- Type: Private
- Industry: Confectionery
- Founded: 1997
- Headquarters: Kostiantynivka, Donetsk Oblast, Ukraine
- Website: konti.ua/en/

KONTI Group (Ukrainian: Група «Конті») is one of the largest manufacturers of confectionery products in Ukraine. It was founded in 1997 and is one of the industry leaders. Kostiantynivka Confectionery Factory is also part of the company.

The company's portfolio includes 200 items including sandwich cookies, complex desserts, boxed sweets and sweets sold by weight, sponge cakes, rolls, candy bars, caramel, crackers and cookies.

== History ==
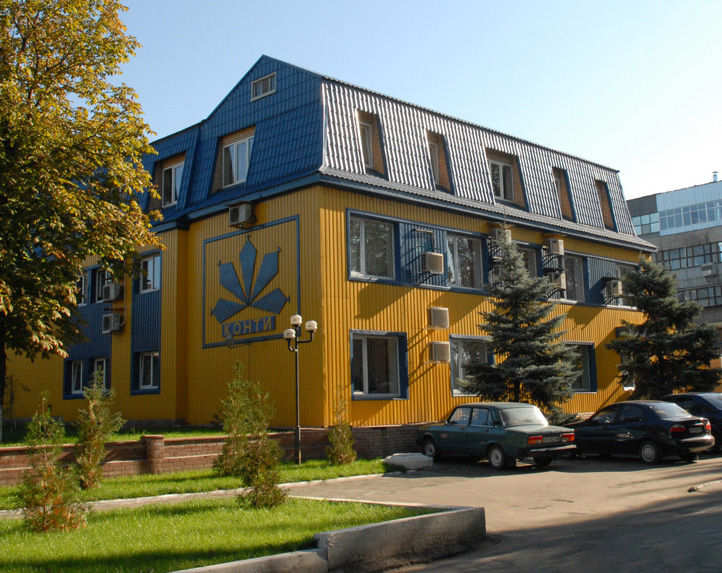
Konti's factory in Kostiantynivka.

The company was founded in 1997 in the city of Kostiantynivka, Ukraine, at the Kostiantynivka Confectionery Factory. The name Konti is an abbreviation of Kostiantynivka Confectionery Factory, although it also went by "Vyrobnyche Obiednannia Kyiv-Konti" prior to 2006. Over the years, it grew to be one of the top three companies in the Ukrainian confectionery market. In 2004, it entered the international market in Russia through the acquisition of a confectionery factory in Kursk to form the CJSC Konti-Rus. By 2008, the company held 10.6% of the Ukrainian market and was ranked second among Ukrainian confectioners. During that time, Konti announced it would be investing $100 million in development in order to increase its market share to 15%, in addition to improving its Russian share from 1.9% to 5%. By 2013, Konti had factories in Donetsk, Horlivka, and its original one in Kostiantynivka, alongside its factory in Kursk. That year it was announced that the company would be potentially sold for a target price of $1 billion through the investment bank Barclays, although this never happened.

In early 2014, the company was restructured through an offshore company registered to the British Virgin Islands. At that time, former Deputy Prime Minister Borys Kolesnikov and his wife, Svitlana, were listed as the beneficial owners with each holding 25% of the shares of the company. Following the outbreak of the War in the Donbas, Konti halted its operations in Horlivka and Donetsk, as the areas were no longer controlled by Ukraine. All production was consolidated in Kostiantynivka, in addition to a logistics centre in Dnipro. In August 2015, Ukraine also temporarily suspended imports of Konti-Rus, the subsidiary in Kursk, after an inspection found violations of food safety.

In 2019, it was confirmed that there would be the construction of a new factory to add onto the Kostiantynivka in Kaniv, Cherkasy Oblast. This was done in order to get back into second place in the confectionery market. The site of construction was near the Mahnat plant site, and it was planned for 200 workers. Kolesnikov also said that in the future, a biscuit factory would be coming to Kostiantynivka, but only once the war ended. That year, it was confirmed they were fifth in the confectionery market with 3.7% of the market with around 8,000 employees. However, in 2020, during the COVID-19 pandemic their net loss grew significantly.

In May 2021, Konti allegedly bought the bankrupt Krasnaya Zarya factory in Ivanovo in Russia through United Partners for 452.2 million roubles, which was half the starting price. This was done in order to bring up Konti-Rus's production capacity by 10% to 150,000 tonnes per year. Kolesnikov, however, said the acquisition never happened because he was on a Russian sanction list since 2018, although other sources disputed this. Following the outbreak of the Russian invasion of Ukraine, Konti-Rus's assets were seized by the Russian government. In July 2025, the KSE Institute stated that Konti had an "exited" status in Russia, meaning that the likelihood of recovering the assets held in the country were negligible. Konti-Rus continues to operate there, while production in Ukraine was relocated to the factory in Kaniv.

== Leading Brands ==
KONTI's key brands include Super Kontik, Bonjour KONTI, TIMI, Amour, BiSKonti and Jack.

== Export ==
"KONTI" products are exported to more than 20 countries of the world: Germany, Poland, Latvia, Greece, Iraq, Yemen, Armenia, Azerbaijan, Georgia, Estonia and many others.

== Quality ==
The company's safety and quality management system has ISO 9001: 2008 and ISO 22000: 2005 certificates.
