= Yevheniy Shevchenko (politician) =

Ukrainian politician

- Євгеній Шевченко
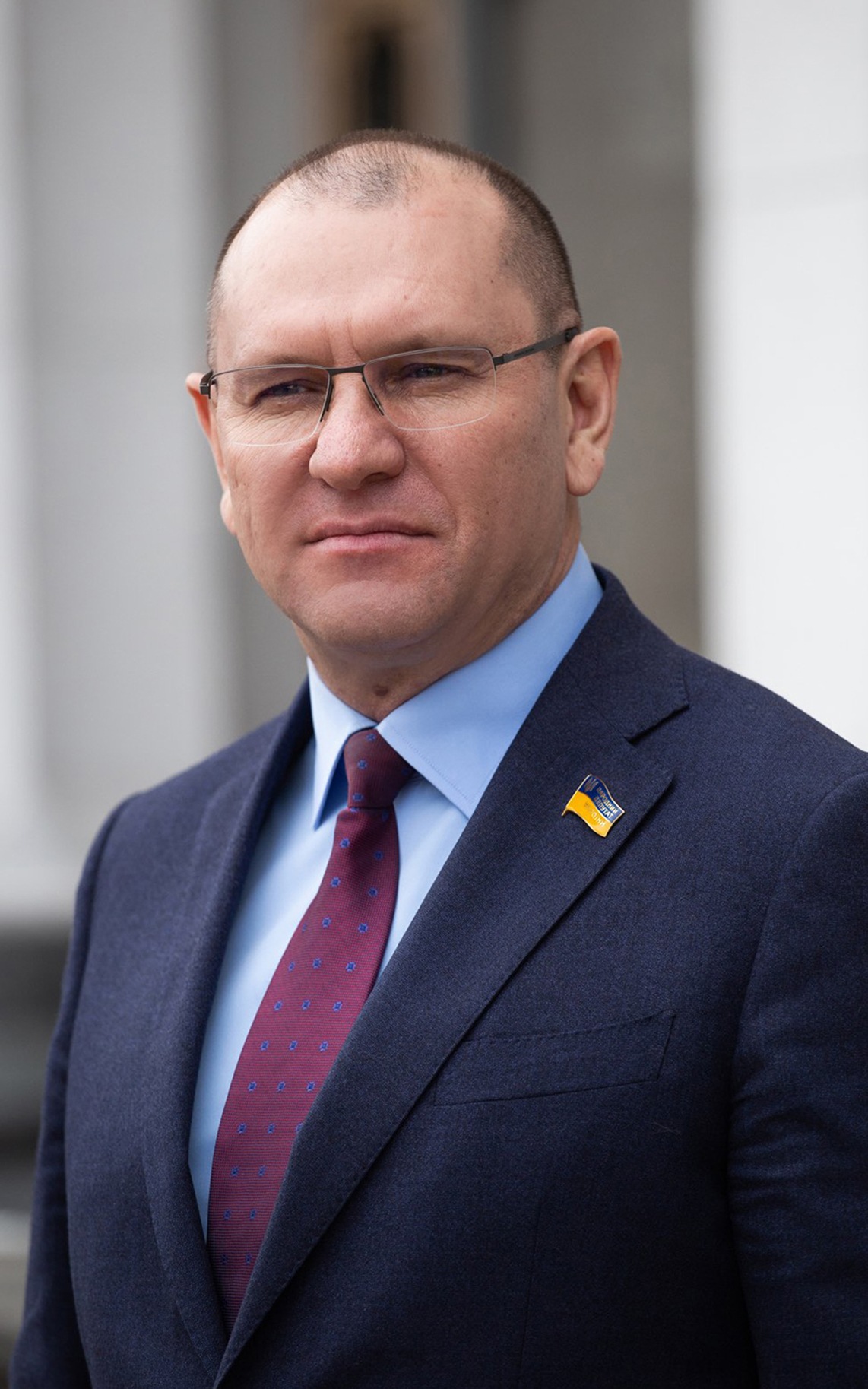
- Shevchenko in 2020

People's Deputy of Ukraine
- Incumbent
- Assumed office 29 August 2019
- Preceded by: Mykola Frolov
- Constituency: Zaporizhzhia Oblast, No. 76

Personal details
- Born: 4 May 1972 (age 54) Melitopol, Ukrainian SSR, Soviet Union (now Ukraine)
- Party: Restoration of Ukraine (since 2022)
- Other political affiliations: Independent (2012, 2021–2022); Liberty (2014); Servant of the People (2019–2021)
- Education: Classic Private University

Yevheniy Volodymyrovych Shevchenko (Ukrainian: Євгеній Володимирович Шевченко; born 4 May 1972) is a Ukrainian politician serving as a People's Deputy of Ukraine from Ukraine's 76th electoral district since 29 August 2019. Elected as a member of Servant of the People, he was expelled from the party after a 2021 meeting with Belarusian leader Alexander Lukashenko.

== Early life and career ==
Shevchenko graduated from the Classic Private University as a lawyer. Served in the army in Pryluky, Chernihiv Oblast, worked as an electrician on the collective farm. Shevchenko held senior positions in such companies as 'Eurocape New Energy', 'ECE Projektmanagement GmbH', 'Ahrostal' and 'Tsvietmiet'.

== Political career ==
Prior to his 2019 election, Shevchenko had twice led unsuccessful campaigns to become a People's Deputy of Ukraine. In the 2012 Ukrainian parliamentary election he had gained 1.47% of the votes as an independent candidate in Ukraine's 75th electoral district, located in the city of Zaporizhzhia. Two years later, in the 2014 Ukrainian parliamentary election, he was a candidate in Ukraine's 210th electoral district in Pryluky (Chernihiv Oblast) from the Liberty party; this time he gained 0.31% of the vote.

During the 2019 Ukrainian presidential election Shevchenko was a representative of Volodymyr Zelenskyy's campaign. In the parliamentary election held later that year, he was a candidate for People's Deputy from Servant of the People in Ukraine's 76th electoral district, located in Zaporizhzhia. Shevchenko won the election with 43% of the vote; Anatolii Pustovarov of Opposition Bloc placed second with 14.5%. At the time of the election Shevchenko was an independent.

=== People's Deputy of Ukraine ===
Shevchenko was inaugurated as a People's Deputy on 29 August 2019. In the Verkhovna Rada (Ukraine's parliament) he joined the Servant of the People faction. He is chair of the Industrial Policy Subcommittee of the Verkhovna Rada Economic Development Committee. He is also head of a parliamentary group for relations with Kazakhstan, as well as a member of similar groups for Azerbaijan, China, Georgia, Iraq, Singapore, and Switzerland.

On 7 March 2022 Shevchenko was detained at a border crossing in Ukraine, in violation of wartime legislation which barred adult males from leaving the country without government permission.

On 21 September 2022 Shevchenko joined the parliamentary group Restoration of Ukraine.

==== Connections to Belarus ====
On 17 August 2020, Shevchenko called on Belarusians to "forgive" Alexander Lukashenko for his "sins and crimes". On 21 April 2021, he went to meet with Belarusian President Alexander Lukashenko. In Minsk, Shevchenko stated that a third of Ukrainians would like to see Lukashenko as their president. Later, the deputy head of the Servant of the People faction Oleksandr Korniyenko stated that the trip was Shevchenko's personal initiative, and party representatives would demand explanations. Shevchenko was expelled from the Servant of the People faction on 24 May 2021. Shevchenko's expellation followed the meeting, as well as controversial comments he made on social media in support of Lukashenko following the diversion of Ryanair Flight 4978 a day prior.

In May 2023 Kyrylo Budanov, chief of Ukraine's Main Directorate of Intelligence, stated that Shevchenko had been engaged in secret negotiations with Lukashenko, upon request of the Ukrainian special services. The goal of these negotiations, according to Budanov, was to prevent Belarus "from being dragged into" the Russian invasion of Ukraine.

== Scandals and pro-Russian activities ==
Known for his pro-Russian stance even before the full-scale Russian invasion, his negative attitude towards the Revolution of Dignity.

He has repeatedly appeared on Russian propaganda TV channels. Expressed sympathy for the pro-Russian propagandist Anatoly Shariy (repeatedly published videos where Shariy ridiculed patriotic actions), Mykola Azarov and the pro-Russian TV channel NASH. He was negative about George Soros, Dmytro Kuleba and the 2019 Ukrainian parliamentary election.

On April 9, 2020, Shevchenko promised to submit to the Verkhovna Rada a resolution recognizing the policy of Ulana Suprun as genocide of the Ukrainian people. In October, Shevchenko called critics of the Constitutional Court "adepts" of the US State Department and George Soros.

In November 2021, Shevchenko expressed a desire to go to Donetsk, where, according to him, "our people are shooting at each other". In October 2023, Shevchenko refused to support the ban on the UOC MP, and in November he took part in collecting signatures to the Speaker of the Verkhovna Rada Ruslan Stefanchuk regarding the need to send the bill "on the ban on the UOC MP" to the Venice Commission in order to thwart its advancement.

In February 2024, Shevchenko called for the Kyiv-Pechersk Lavra to be returned to the use of the UOC MP. After the 8 July 2024 Russian strikes on Ukraine, Shevchenko spread Russian propaganda narratives, calling for peace with the Russians.

== Criminal investigations ==
In November 2021, the SBU searched Shevchenko's home, looking for Russian contraband military goods. At the time, he was considered a person cooperating with the Main Directorate of Intelligence of the Ministry of Defence of Ukraine. However, the State Security Service stated that he was not their employee.

On November 14, 2024, Shevchenko was charged with high treason under Part 1 of Art. 111 of the Criminal Code of Ukraine.

On November 15, the court arrested Shevchenko for 60 days, until January 11, 2025. On January 7, 2025, the court extended the preventive measure until March 7.
