= Igor Abramovych =

Ukrainian politician (born 1984)

- Ігор Абрамович
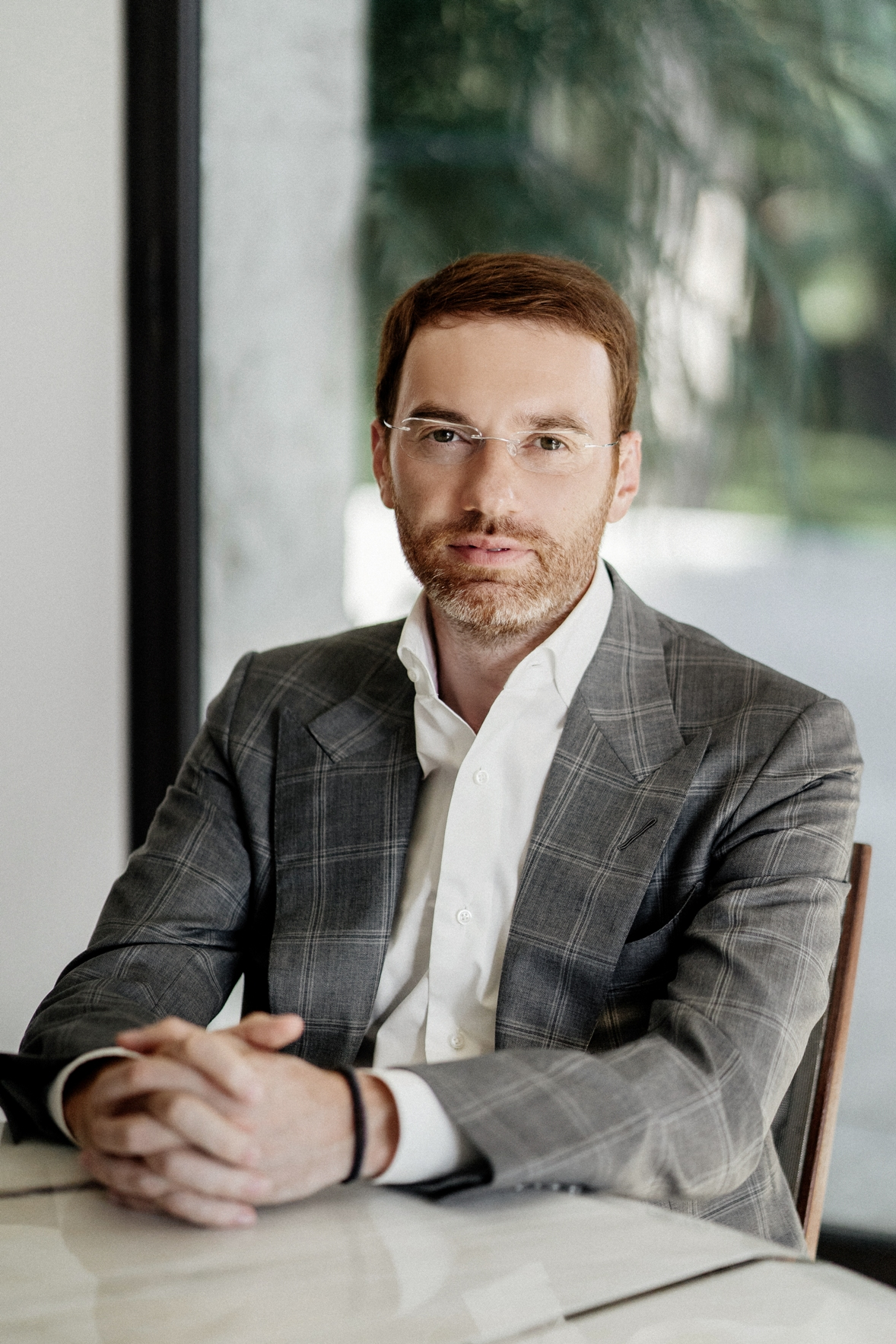

People's Deputy of Ukraine
- In office 29 August 2019 – 6 February 2023

Personal details
- Born: 24 August 1984 (age 42) Kharkiv, Ukrainian SSR, Soviet Union (now Ukraine)
- Party: Restoration of Ukraine (since 2022)
- Other political affiliations: Opposition Platform — For Life (2019–2022)

Igor Oleksandrovych Abramovych (Ukrainian: Ігор Олександрович Абрамович, romanized: Ihor Oleksandrovych Abramovych; born 24 August 1984) is a Ukrainian businessman and politician. He was a People's Deputy of Ukraine from 2019 to 2023.

== Education ==
Abramovych graduated from the Kharkiv Lyceum No. 174 "Professional" with an in-depth study of the English language and computer technologies in 2001.

He graduated from St. Andrew's Cambridge and London School (United Kingdom) in 2004.

He studied Business Economics at Kharkiv National Academy of Urban Economy, (2007), Administrative Management at National Technical University Kharkiv Polytechnic Institute (2009), Geophysics at Ivano-Frankivsk National Technical University of Oil and Gas, (2014) and Heat Power Engineering at Igor Sikorsky Kyiv Polytechnic Institute, (2017).

== Career ==
From 2007 to 2012, Abramovych held senior positions in a construction holding company.

2012-2015 — Deputy Chairman of the Board, PJSC Concern AVEC and Co.

2016-2017 — President, Inter Energy Group, an engineering company

From 2017 to 2019, Abramovych was engaged in the development of his business areas.

== Business ==
Igor Abramovych's primary business areas are gas production, alternative energy, gas and electricity trading, road construction, residential and commercial properties construction and development, information technologies (IT), and stock markets.

According to public register data, Abramovych company group [VY1] includes both Ukrainian legal entities and non-resident structures, such as Imeani Investments Ltd., Samaleni Finance Ltd., Imeani Holdings Ltd., and Nisyomi Investments Ltd.

== Political career ==
2006-2011 — Deputy of Oktyabrskyi city council in Kharkiv, member of the commission on housing and community amenities.

2007-2012 — Assistant of People's Deputy of Ukraine of the 6th Convocation Oleksandr Feldman of the Yulia Tymoshenko Bloc

In the 2019 parliamentary elections, Igor Abramovych was elected as People's Deputy of Ukraine from Opposition Platform — For Life (OPFL) party, under #14.

After being elected to the Verkhovna Rada of the 9th Convocation, Igor Abramovych was appointed as Deputy Chairman of the Committee on Finance, Tax and Customs Policy. Igor Abramovych was a member of the eponymous parliamentary faction. He participated as a member of the interparliamentary relations groups with the many countries, including United States, the United Kingdom, the United Arab Emirates, Switzerland, Germany, France, and Austria, promoting dialogue, strengthening bilateral ties, and fostering cooperation in political, economic, and cultural spheres.

On February 24, 2022, the first day of the Russian invasion of Ukraine, Abramovich announced that he had resigned from the OPFL.

On 22 May 2022 Abramovych became co-chairman of the deputy group Restoration of Ukraine.

On February 6, 2023, Abramovych asked parliament to withdraw his mandate. He was officially deprived of his parliamentary seat by parliament on the same day.

== Legislative activity ==
According to the information of Slovo I Delo agency, Abramovych was on the top of the list of the most active deputies of the OPFL party. He left the party on 24 February 2022.

Abramovych is a co-author of nearly 100 legislative initiatives concerning issues of corporate raiding, relieving fiscal pressure on small business, social security (particularly, increasing of state aid amount after the birth of a child and its differentiation for the second, third and following children, VAT cancellation for socially significant goods for citizens entitled to benefits, increasing of minimum pension level).

Abramovych is in the top three in terms of the number of adopted bills among the party's deputies.

== Voting ==
Abramovych is not a member of any cross-party control group in OPFL, which allows him to have an independent position when voting.

According to the social network OPORA, Abramovych took first place among the party's representatives whose voting results differed from the position in the party.

In 65.7% of cases, his choice differed from the OPFL party position.

== Investor Rights Protection ==
Abramovych was a member of the Commission of Major Investors' Rights Protection created in Verkhovna Rada.

== International activity ==
Igor Abramovych was a member of Verkhovna Rada Parliamentary Delegation in NATO Assembly, the interparliamentary groups of the US, the United Kingdom, Germany, France, Austria, Switzerland, the UAE and China.

== Performance evaluation ==
According to the leader of the Servant of the People faction Davyd Arakhamia, Abramovych "with his pro-Ukrainian position was never associated with the ideology of the OPFL. It is enough to look at the 'synchronicity' of his voting with former fellow party members. He is among strangers in the rear of the fifth column."

The representative of the local self-government, the mayor of Kharkiv Igor Terekhov gave a similar description: "Igor always, when the OPFL faction existed, was a 'white crow' in it - a person who was distinguished from most of his colleagues by a clear pro-Ukrainian position. Precisely pro-Ukrainian, without any hints on the possibility to give in even the slightest to the national interests of the state".

According to the Chairman of the Finance Committee of the Verkhovna Rada, Danylo Hetmantsev, Abramovych always approached his work from purely pro-Ukrainian positions and regardless of political colors. Also, Hetmantsev notes, the vast majority of reforms that the committee has carried out since 2019 would not have taken place without Abramovych.

Davyd Arakhamia believes that the Restoration of Ukraine parliamentary group created by Abramovych in the most difficult months of the war only strengthened the stability of the parliament against the external aggressor.

Igor Abramovych's help as a patron received favorable reviews. According to Kharkiv Mayor Igor Terekhov, from the first day of the full-scale war, Abramovych began helping Kharkiv. "The humanitarian aid that he sent to his hometown can be counted in dozens of tons. Every day he called and asked what else needed help? And he found what was necessary, even if it was impossible to find it, and sent it to Kharkiv, to his compatriots. I know for sure that, having completed the mandate of the people's deputy, Igor Abramovych will remain the same person he was before: a patriot of Ukraine and a Kharkiv resident who will continue to do everything to support his native city," Terekhov summarized.

== Welfare ==
In 2019 Igor Abramovych declared a large vehicle park, luxury collection of expensive Swiss watches (Hublot, Rolex, Audemars Piguet, Breguet), expensive jewellery (Jacob & Co, Cartier, Tom Ford), pieces of art (Dudu Gerstein works, etc.).

Also, in 2019 he declared ₴88 million in cash[VY1] .

In 2020, Igor Abramovych entered TOP-25 of the wealthiest deputies of Ukraine of the 9th Convocation; mass media calls Abramovych "young billionaire" from OPFL.

== Hobbies ==
Abramovych collects works of modern art and is fond of extreme sports and chess.

== Family ==
Abramovych is married to Maryna and has five children. His father is Olexandr Abramovych, a businessman. His grandfather is Ilya Abramovych (1930–2005) a famous Ukrainian engineer and inventor, professor, academician, honored worker of science and technology of Ukraine, and honorary citizen of Kharkiv.
