= Oleh Voronko =

Ukrainian politician

- Олег Воронько
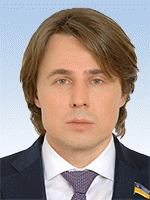

People's Deputy of Ukraine
- Incumbent
- Assumed office 29 August 2019
- Preceded by: Anatoliy Kuzmenko
- Constituency: Kirovohrad Oblast, No. 103

Personal details
- Born: 15 May 1974 (age 52) Svitlovodsk, Ukrainian SSR, Soviet Union (now Ukraine)
- Party: Restoration of Ukraine (since 2022)
- Other political affiliations: Independent; Servant of the People (2019–2022); Smart Politics (2021–2022)
- Education: Higher School of Occupational Safety Management; National Metallurgical Academy of Ukraine; Dnipropetrovsk Chemical-Technological Institute

Oleh Yevheniyovych Voronko (Ukrainian: Олег Євгенійович Воронько; born 15 May 1974) is a Ukrainian politician currently serving as a People's Deputy of Ukraine representing Ukraine's 103rd electoral district since 2019. Elected as a member of Servant of the People, he has been a member of Restoration of Ukraine since 2022.

== Early life and career ==
Oleh Yevheniyovych Voronko was born on 15 May 1974 in the city of Svitlovodsk, then under the Soviet Union. He graduated from the Higher School of Occupational Safety Management in Katowice, Poland, as well as the National Metallurgical Academy of Ukraine, both times in management. He also graduated from the faculty of high molecular weight compound technology at the Dnipropetrovsk Chemical-Technological Institute.

Prior to becoming a People's Deputy of Ukraine, Voronko worked in the IT sector, developing technology designed to improve the durability of technological equipment. He also founded Instant Foods Group and Agrotrade Group, the latter of which is a produce transport company.

== Political career ==
In the 2019 Ukrainian parliamentary election, Voronko was the candidate of Servant of the People in Ukraine's 103rd electoral district. At the time of the election, he was an independent. He was successfully elected, defeating former mayor of Oleksandriia and People's Deputy Stepan Tsapiuk (belonging to Opposition Platform — For Life) with 38.01% against Tsapiuk's 14.75%.

In the Verkhovna Rada (parliament of Ukraine), Voronko joined the Servant of the People faction and the Verkhovna Rada Committee on Finances, Taxes, and Customs Policy, as well as the Kirovohradshchyna inter-factional association. In 2019, he declared an income of ₴123 million, and the same year was involved in a controversy after he was among the Servant of the People deputies to vote against elimination of intermediary sites for property appraisal. On 8 November 2021, Voronko was listed as one of the Servants of the People joining Smart Politics, a political association created by former Chairman of the Verkhovna Rada Dmytro Razumkov.

In January 2022, Voronko allegedly came under investigation by the State Bureau of Investigation for forging documents in a court case. Four days following a search of his home, Voronko left Servant of the People, claiming his membership in Smart Politics had brought pressure upon him from state authorities.

In May 2022, following the 2022 Russian invasion of Ukraine, Voronko joined the Restoration of Ukraine group.
