= Vadym Stolar =

Ukrainian businessman and politician

- Вадим Михайлович Столар
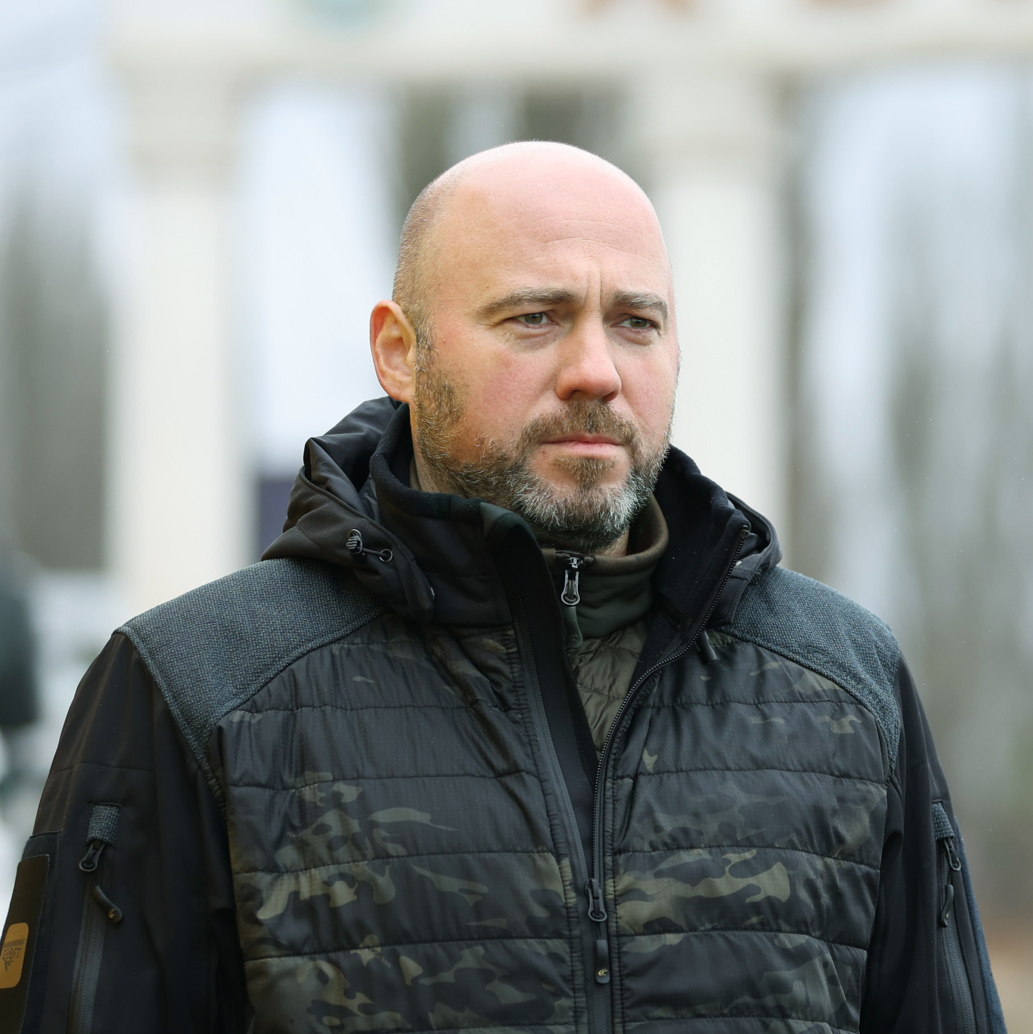

Member of the Verkhovna Rada
- Constituency: Multi-member district
- In office 2010–2012
- Incumbent
- Assumed office 2019

Personal details
- Born: August 10, 1982 Kyiv, Ukrainian SSR, Soviet Union (now Ukraine)
- Party: Independent (2022–present)
- Education: Kyiv University of Law of the National Academy of Sciences of Ukraine
- Occupation: businessman, politician
- Known for: Founder of the Vadym Stolar Foundation

Vadym Mykhailovych Stolar (August 10, 1982, Kyiv) is a Ukrainian businessman, philanthropist, and politician. He served as a People's Deputy of Ukraine in the 6th and 9th convocations. He also served as a deputy of the Kyiv City Council.

== Early life and education ==
Vadym Stolar was born on August 10, 1982, in Kyiv. His grandfather suffered significant injuries while saving people during the Chornobyl disaster and used a wheelchair. To honor his memory, Stolar funded the construction of a new building for the Kyiv History Museum in 2012, which had been without its own premises for eight years.

As a child, he trained in freestyle wrestling at Dynamo sports club and competed internationally, but he had to abandon professional sports after a severe injury. In 2000, he married Inna Maystruk.

In 2003, he graduated from Kyiv University of Law of the National Academy of Sciences of Ukraine with a degree in law.

== Business career ==
Stolar began working at the age of 15. At 16, he started his own entrepreneurial activities and established a mushroom farm in the village of Motovylivka, later developing it into a major agricultural enterprise.

From 1999 to 2000, he worked as a manager for the travel agency "Yana". Between 2001 and 2007, he was the director of LLC "Vidrodzhennia," later renamed LLC "Trade House Vidrodzhennia."

Since 2017, he has been engaged in investment activities through the Genesis and Madison investment funds. The funds' portfolio includes commercial and residential real estate, and since 2020, the Live.Network media holding, which was sold in 2022.

== Political сareer ==
In 2006, Stolar was elected to the Kyiv Regional Council as part of the "Our Ukraine" party list.

From 2010 to 2012, he served as a People's Deputy in the Verkhovna Rada’s 6th convocation, representing the Party of Regions. He was a member of the parliamentary Committee on Combating Organized Crime and Corruption. In August 2012, he left the Party of Regions.

In the 2012 parliamentary elections, he ran as an independent candidate for the Verkhovna Rada of Ukraine in one of Kyiv's single-member majoritarian constituencies but lost to the opposition candidate from the “Batkivshchyna” party, Oleksandr Bryhynets.

In the 2014 parliamentary elections, he again ran in a single-member constituency in Kyiv but was defeated by Andriy Biletsky, the founder and commander of the Azov Battalion.

In 2019, he was elected as a People's Deputy in the 9th convocation, representing the OPFL party. He was a member of the parliamentary Committee on Agrarian and Land Policy. From December 2019, he led the Kyiv branch of OPFL. After leaving the OPFL faction in early 2022, Stolar joined the newly formed parliamentary group "Restoration of Ukraine."

== Public and charitable activities ==
In 2012, Stolar financed the construction of the Church of St. Nestor the Chronicler on the grounds of Kyiv University of Law. The church was consecrated and opened on September 19, 2013.

As a Member of Parliament and honorary president of All-Ukrainian Federation "Street Workout Ukraine," he spearheaded the renovation of more than 15 sports grounds in Obolon and the construction of 10 new ones.

In 2013 he became a partner of the photo contest to fill Wikimedia Commons with images of natural monuments called Wiki Loves Earth.

In 2014, Stolar funded the creation of a digital library for the Shevchenko National Museum as part of preparations for the 200th anniversary of Taras Shevchenko's birth.

Since 2023, he has collaborated with various charitable foundations engaged in programs for military prosthetics, psychological, and physical rehabilitation of veterans and servicemen. He also finances the treatment, rehabilitation, and prosthetics of wounded soldiers abroad, in Washington and Malta, where doctors handle complex cases and severe amputations.

He supported the launch of the Children Hub center in Warsaw and the "Levchyk" center in Lviv, which provide free assistance to children with autism spectrum disorders.

== Vadym Stolar Foundation ==
In early 2020, Stolar established the Vadym Stolar Foundation, initially focusing on COVID-19 relief by purchasing medical equipment for hospitals. Following Russia's full-scale invasion of Ukraine, the foundation expanded its efforts to support military personnel and civilians. The Foundation provides military equipment, high-tech machinery, armored vehicles, specialized off-road vehicles, fuel, food packages, and more.

In 2022, the foundation launched the social project ‘Recover’, aimed at providing psycho-emotional support to families affected by the war. As part of the project, psychologists help military families with children, families who have lost loved ones or their homes, find the strength to recover and move forward. The project participants join the camps in the least dangerous and most picturesque places in Ukraine, where they are provided with a space of warmth, support and care.

In 2023, the foundation launched a grant program worth 1 million UAH for Ukrainian non-profit organizations focused on aiding those affected by the war. The first grant program focused on projects for the physical rehabilitation of those affected by the war, the second aimed at the psycho-emotional recovery of Ukrainians, the third grant program at the psycho-emotional and the physical rehabilitation of the military.

In 2024, he presented the book Stories of the Strong—stories about Ukrainians who survived the horrors of occupation, captivity, torture, bombing and rocket attacks. The book was created so that the world would know the truth about the crimes committed and still being committed by the Russian occupation army on the territory of Ukraine.

== Personal life ==
Stolar is divorced and has five children: Diana Stolar, was born on June 14, 2001, and died on December 6, 2020. His other children are Gemma Stolar (born June 1, 2007), Eva Stolar (born September 23, 2009), David Stolar (born August 3, 2012), Daniel Stolar (born August 25, 2015) and Darii Stolar (born November 19, 2024).
