= Tetiana Plachkova =

Ukrainian politician

- Тетяна Плачкова
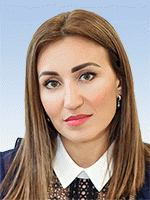

People's Deputy of Ukraine
- In office 29 August 2019 – 14 July 2023

Personal details
- Born: 5 January 1983 (age 43) Krynychne, Ukrainian SSR, Soviet Union (now Krynychne, Ukraine)
- Party: Restoration of Ukraine
- Other political affiliations: Opposition Platform — For Life (until 2022)

Tetiana Mykhailivna Plachkova (Ukrainian: Тетяна Михайлівна Плачкова; born 5 January 1983) is a Ukrainian politician who was a People's Deputy, elected to the Verkhovna Rada in 2019. Elected as a member of the Opposition Platform — For Life, she is currently a member of Restoration of Ukraine.

== Early life and education ==
Of Bulgarian descent, Plachkova was born on 5 January 1983 in Krynychne, Odesa Oblast. She graduated from the faculty of journalism, and later the faculty of public administration of the National University Odesa Law Academy.

== Career ==
From 2012 to 2014, Plachkova was an assistant to People's Deputy Kateryna Vashchuk. In 2013, she became the director of the Odesa company Legal and Consulting Center PravoProekt. She worked at the State Architectural and Construction Inspectorate. In October 2018, she received a lawyer's license and became the founder of the law firm Key and Case from Odesa. She is a member of the Odesa Oblast Bar Council.

In the 2019 parliamentary election, Plachkova was elected as a deputy on the Opposition Platform - For Life ticket. In the Verkhovna Rada, she became a member of the committee on the organization of state power, local self-government, regional development and urban planning.

== Personal life ==
Plachkova is a mother of four children, two sons from her current partner and two children from a previous partner.
