= Opinion polling for the next Ukrainian presidential election =

In the run up to the next Ukrainian presidential election, various organisations carried out opinion polling to gauge voting intention in Ukraine. The results of such polls are displayed in this article. The date range for these polls is from the 2019 Ukrainian presidential election to the present day.

== Credibility of polling firms ==
In Ukraine, there are many unknown and unregistered polling firms. They can suddenly establish and then disappear, be influenced by certain politicians, manipulate questions and the sample. These pseudo-organizations make up opinion polls in the interests of certain politicians and parties, especially Viktor Medvedchuk and OPZZh.

There is a whole database Sellers of ratings of the independent edition Texty, which includes 119 organizations and 220 individuals who have been spotted in the publication of dubious opinion polls or in the hidden PR of politicians. For each of them there is a certificate and history of their activities. There are also separately published the names of real companies with a positive reputation. An important criterion of professional organization is membership in the Sociological Association of Ukraine (SAU).

As of January 2022, the following organizations are accredited members of the SAU:

- Oleksandr Yaremenko Ukrainian Institute for Social Research
- Vasyl Karazin Kharkiv National University
- East Ukrainian Foundation for Social Research
- Kyiv International Institute of Sociology (KIIS)
- GfK Ukraine
- Oleksandr Razumkov Ukrainian Center for Economic and Political Studies (Razumkov Centre)
- Kantar Ukraine
- SOCIS Center for Social and Marketing Research (SOCIS) (Note: associated with Petro Poroshenko through its beneficiary and Poroshenko's political strategist Ihor Hryniv)
- Rating Group Ukraine (Rating)
- FAMA Sociological Agency
- Social Monitoring Center (SMC)

In 2018, GfK Ukraine employees founded a new company – Info Sapiens.

Ilko Kucheriv Democratic Initiatives Foundation (DIF) also publishes objective data, but it is not a polling firm in the classical sense, but acts as a mediator between the public and polling firms.

== First round ==
During the 2019 Ukrainian presidential election, candidate (and later winner of the election) Volodymyr Zelenskyy stated that he was running for only one term. In May 2021, Zelenskyy stated that it was too early to say whether he would run for a second term, but this decision would depend on the attitude to him in society and would be influenced by his family. In September 2025, Zelenskyy stated that he was "ready" to not run again after the war's conclusion.

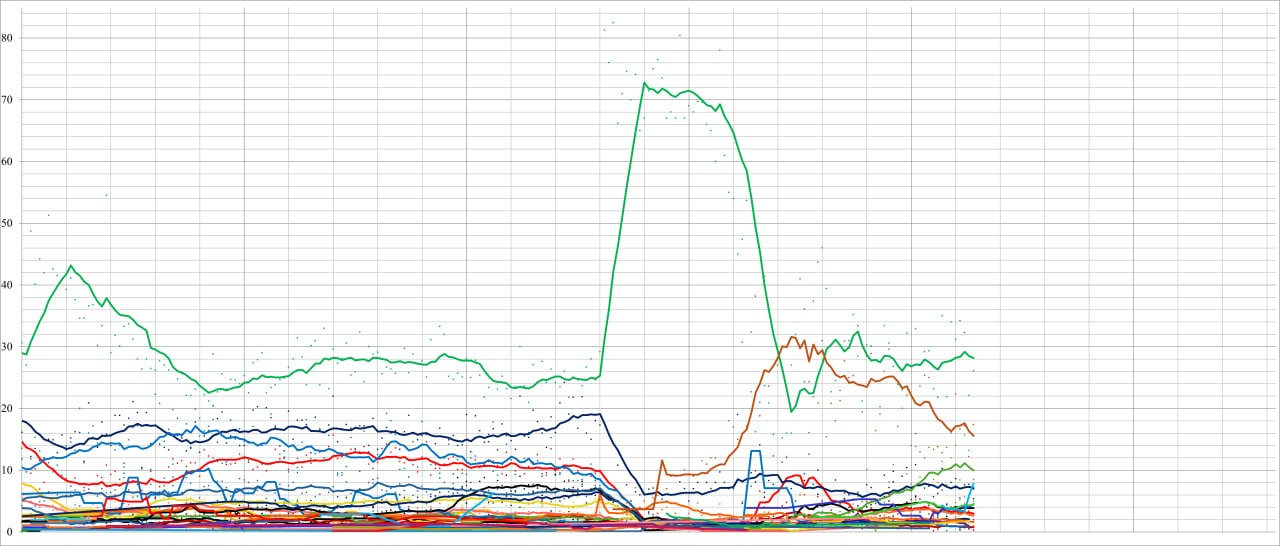

=== Since November 2023 ===
Dates conducted	Polling firm	Margin of error	Sample size	Zelenskyy SN	Razumkov RP	Poroshenko YeS	Goncharenko YeS	Tymoshenko VoB	Boyko PZZhM	Prytula 24S	Biletsky NK	Klitschko UDAR	Groysman USH	Terekhov UKh	Zaluzhnyi Ind.	Fedorov Ind.	Arestovych Ind.	Budanov Ind.	Prokopenko Ind.	Usyk Ind.	Others	Undecided/no vote	Lead
3–5 Oct 2026	Rating	± 3.1 pp	1,000	26.7	6.0	8.9		2.2	1.6	2.8	6.3				23.6	8.8		7.8			5.2		3.1
8–23 Aug 2026	Info Sapiens	± 3.1 pp	1,000	31.3	3.1	7.4	1.8	2.7	1.0	1.3	3.8	0.4		4.2	17.3	9.7		7.4	1.4	4.3	2.9		14.0
28 Jul – 2 Aug 2026	SOCIS	± 2.6 pp	2,000	17.8	3.4	4.9	1.5	2.8	1.1	1.0	2.2			4.1	17.1	10.5		6.7		2.5	4.4 (Note: Vitalii Kim - 0.7)	20.4	0.7
20–21 Jul 2026	Rating	± 3.1 pp	1,000	22.3	3.7	4.6		1.7		0.8	2.3	0.3		4.3	14.9	13.4		7.2		5.9	4.0	14.5	7.4
15 Jul 2026	Dismissal of Mykhailo Fedorov from Ministry of Defence of Ukraine sparks a wave of nationwide protests																						
12–19 Jun 2026	Info Sapiens	± 3.1 pp	1,000	34.2	3.7	7.1	2.9	3.8	0.5	2.1	2.0	0.3		5.2	16.7	3.0		8.4	1.5	5.5	3.0		17.5
30 May – 3 Jun 2026	Rating & IRI	± 2.0 pp	2,404	34	4	8	2	2	1	2	2				16			12		3	3	11	18
12–18 Mar 2026	SOCIS	± 2.5 pp	1,204	29.3	4.3	7.4		2.9		1.6	4.0	0.7		4.4	25.0			13.7			6.6 (Note: Vitalii Kim - 1.4, Oleksandr Vilkul - 0.6)		4.3
14 Jan 2026	NABU publishes an anti-corruption investigation against Yulia Tymoshenko, giving her a suspicion on violation of Ukrainian criminal code.																						
31–31 Dec 2025	IPSOS	?	2,000	20		9									23			7				17	3
17–26 Dec 2025	Info Sapiens	± 3.1 pp	1,000	23.9	3.6	4.3	0.8	2.9	1.4	1.4	3.3	0.5	0.9		17.1			4.2	1.8	1.7	2.4 (Note: Oleh Liashko – 0.8)	26.7	6.8
12–18 Dec 2025	SOCIS	± 2.6 pp	2,000	30.6	5.0	7.2	1.6	6.1	2.4	2.1	3.2				29.6			8.1	1.9		2.2		1.0
10 Nov 2025	NABU and SAP execute Operation Midas exposing corruption of Zelensky's close friend Timur Mindich																						
10–16 Oct 2025	SOCIS	± 2.0 pp	2,000	30.1	4.4	7.2	1.4	3.9	2.1	2.4	3.7	1.1			28.9			5.0	1.1		8.7 (Note: Serhiy Tihipko – 1.6)		1.2
1–3 Oct 2025	American Political Services	?	1,200	30.3	4.1	7.6		4.9	1.1	1.7	3.4	2.0			28.5			7.6				5.6	0.8
21–23 Aug 2025	Rating	± 2.5 pp	1,600	35.2	3.2	5.3		3.4	1.6	2.0	2.2	0.6			25.3			4.5			4.0	12.8	9.9
22–27 Jul 2025	Rating	± 2.0 pp	2,400	32	4	6	3	3	1	3	3	1			25			5			3	14	7
22 Jul 2025	2025 anti-corruption protests in Ukraine start following the presidential signature of 12414 law limiting independence of NABU and SAP																						
6–11 Jun 2025	SOCIS	± 2.6 pp	2,000	30.9	5.4	6.3	1.5	4.8	2.1	2.5	4.9	0.7			27.7			5.2	2.7		5.4		3.2
14–23 Mar 2025	SOCIS	± 2.6pp	2,000	22.7	3.1	4.5	0.6	3.5		1.6	2.1	0.6			20.8			2.3				26.4	1.9
13 Mar 2025	Russia recaptures Sudzha, marking end to Ukrainian Kursk campaign and transition of military activity onto territory of Ukrainian Sumy Oblast																						
6–12 Mar 2025	NMS	± 2.8 pp	1,020	39.4	3.0	4.4	2.4	2.6							15.4			2.6			1.0	25.3	24.0
5–10 Mar 2025	IPSOS	± 3.1 pp	1,000	46	3	5	3.2	3		2	1	1			31		2	3			4		15
28 Feb 2025	A conflict sparks between US President Donald Trump and Volodymyr Zelenskyy during the 2025 Trump–Zelenskyy Oval Office meeting																						
25–27 Feb 2025	Survation	?	737	43.7	6.1	10.0	2.4	5.7							20.9		4.0	2.6			4.4		22.8
19 Feb 2025	US President Donald Trump claims Zelensky's approval rating is equal to 4%, calling him a "dictator without elections"																						
13 Feb 2025	Zelensky imposes personal RNBO sanctions againtst Petro Poroshenko																						
3–9 Feb 2025	SOCIS	?	2,000	21.9	3.6	7.7	1.1	3.7	0.9	2.5	3.9	1.1		2.4	37.4		1.1	4.4	1.7		6.6		15.5
5–11 Dec 2024	SOCIS	?	2,000	24.3	8.3	9.4	1.4	6.0		2.9	2.2	2.0			36.1			2.8			4.7		11.8
22 Nov – 7 Dec 2024	KIIS	± 3.3 pp	1,600	32–41		5–6																	26–36
15–21 Nov 2024	SMC	± 2.9 pp	1,200	16	4	7		4	3	2	1	2	1		27		1	6			3	25.0	20
6 Aug 2024	Ukrainian Kursk Oblast offensive begins, Ukraine occupies pre-2022 invasion territories of Russia.																						
5 May 2024	Ocheretyne Breakthrough takes place, in the following weeks Russian Armed Forces achieve noticiable gains in occupied Donetsk Oblast																						
1–15 Mar 2024	ISPP NAPS of Ukraine, APPU	± 3.2 pp	1,200	20.9		8.3		2.3		3.2					23.6		0.8				2.7	38.2	2.7
22 Feb – 1 Mar 2024	SOCIS	± 2.1 pp	3,000	23.7	5.6	6.4		2.8	1.1	4.1		0.9			41.4		1.5	3.2					17.7
3–7 Nov 2023	Rating	± 2.2 pp	2,000	47.4	1.9	4.6	1.1	1.6		4.9		1.2	1.2		30.7		0.9				4.4 (Note: Yurii Butusov – 0.9)		16.7

=== October 2021 – July 2023 ===
Dates conducted	Polling firm	Margin of error	Sample size	Zelenskyy SN	Razumkov RP	Poroshenko YeS	Tymoshenko VOB	Boyko OPZZh	Medvedchuk OPZZh	Hrytsenko HP	Smeshko SiCh	Liashko RPOL	Koshulynskyi Svoboda	Tyahnybok Svoboda	Prytula Holos	Rudik Holos	Klitschko UDAR	Groysman USH	Yatsenyuk NF	Murayev Nashi	Sadovyi Self Reliance	Others	Lead
12–15 January 2023	Info Sapiens	± 3.1 pp	1,000	69	1	5	1				1				3		1	1					64
11 November 2022	Ukraine liberates Kherson following a counteroffensive																						
6 Sept – Oct 2022	Ukraine liberates most of the occupied Kharkiv Oblast during the Kharkiv counteroffensive																						
12–18 August 2022	Info Sapiens	± 3.1 pp	1,000	67	1	5	1				1				5			1		1			62
21–26 June 2022	Info Sapiens	± 3.1 pp	1,018	65	1	6	1	1			2				4	1	1	1		1			59
01-30 June 2022	Info Sapiens	± 3.1 pp	1,000	70	1	5	2	1			1				3			1		1			65
28–29 May 2022	Info Sapiens	± 3.1 pp	1,024	71	2	3	1	1			1				3			1		1			68
18–19 April 2022	Info Sapiens	± 3.1 pp	1,034	76	2	6	1	1			1				1		1			1			70
1–8 April 2022	Russian withdrawal from North Ukraine																						
24–28 Mar 2022	Info Sapiens	± 3.1 pp	1,000	81.3	1.2	5.9	2.2	1.6			2.1	0.1			2.0	0.1	0.4	1.0		1.1		0.9 (Note: Oleksandr Vilkul – 0.1, Arsen Avakov – 0.0, Denys Shmyhal – 0.0)	75.4
20 Mar 2022	11 parties, including OPZZh, OB, Nashi and PSh, were suspended by the National Security and Defense Council for the period of martial law due to their ties to Russia.																						
24 Feb 2022	Russia invades Ukraine																						
16–21 Feb 2022	Info Sapiens	± 2.2 pp	2,076	29.2	5.2	17.3	9.7	7.5			8.6	3.1		1.8	6.2		1.4	4.1		6.0		0.0	11.9
11–18 Feb 2022	Rating	± 1.4 pp	4,800	24.6	6.9	18.0	9.5	8.3			7.5	2.9		1.9			2.0	5.3	2.2	5.9		5.2	6.6
11–16 Feb 2022	SOCIS	± 2.4 pp	2,000	23.7	8.2	21.9	9.3	8.5	2.3		7.4	1.7		1.7		0.4		6.4		7.7		0.6	1.8
12–13 Feb 2022	Rating	± 2.2 pp	2,000	24.6	6.2	16.8	9.9	8.3			6.6	3.1		2.0			2.3	5.7	1.8	6.9	2.1	3.6	7.8
6–18 Feb 2022	ISNANU	± 2.3 pp	2,000	26.7	6.1	16.0	9.2	9.5			5.7							4.2		4.7			10.7
5–13 Feb 2022	KIIS	± 2.4 pp	2,000	25.1	7.2	21.8	11.8	8.3			6.1	3.9		2.0		0.7		4.8		6.5		2.0	3.3
28–31 Jan 2022	Razumkov	± 2.9 pp	1,206	26.0	8.2	24.2	10.3	7.0	1.6		5.4	2.0		0.9				3.1		7.0		4.3	1.8
20–21 Jan 2022	KIIS	± 3.2 pp	1,205	23.5	5.0	20.9	11.8	9.3	2.6		9.6	3.4		1.1				4.3		6.8		1.7	2.6
17–22 Dec 2021	DIF/Razumkov	± 2.3 pp	2,018	24.2	9.3	16.1	9.9	9.2		1.6	6.4	1.7	2.2		2.7		1.4	5.0		6.3		4.1	8.1
16–18 Dec 2021	Rating	± 2.0 pp	2,500	24.2	6.8	13.7	9.6	9.2			6.7	3.1		2.2			2.0	6.2	2.9	6.9	2.3	4.1	10.5
9–17 Dec 2021	KIIS	± 3.3 pp	2,025	27.6	5.9	16.0	9.0	9.4	1.9		6.6	4.1		0.5	3.0	0.3	5.2	1.4	1.1	4.9		3.1 (Note: Anatoly Shariy – 1.4)	11.6
11–16 Dec 2021	SOCIS	± 2.4 pp	2,000	24.3	7.1	17.9	12.5	11.5	2.0		7.4	1.2		1.3		0.1		6.2		6.3		2.0	6.4
3–11 Dec 2021	KIIS	± 2.4 pp	2,000	27.1	6.3	19.7	11.3	6.6			7.7	4.8		1.8		0.5		5.1		6.5		2.6	7.4
28 Nov – 10 Dec 2021	SMC	± 1.0 pp	10,000	23.6	7.5	15.5	9.4	11.9			6.9	2.4		1.3			1.2	3.8	0.7	7.0		3.1 (Note: Arsen Avakov – 0.8)	8.1
6–8 Dec 2021	Rating	± 2.0 pp	2,500	23.5	7.5	13.4	9.9	9.3			6.7	3.2		1.5			2.7	5.5	3.1	6.5	2.4	4.8	10.1
11–17 Nov 2021	Razumkov	± 2.3 pp	2,018	25.2	7.5	17.5	9.4	10.9		2.6	5.2	3.1	2.2		1.9		0.8	4.9		4.8		4.0	7.7
10–13 Nov 2021	Rating	± 2.0 pp	2,500	23.1	8.3	13.3	10.7	9.2			6.9	3.3		1.4			2.2	6.1	2.3	7.0	2.8	3.2	9.8
4–9 Nov 2021	Rating	± 1.5 pp	5,000	21.8	8.8	14.5	10.8	11.0			6.2	4.0		2.4			1.7	5.7		6.4	2.6	4.2	7.3
29 Oct – 4 Nov 2021	SOCIS	± 2.4 pp	2,000	27.8	6.7	18.8	11.7	12.3	1.9		5.4	1.9		1.5		0.0		4.6		6.0		1.8	9.0

=== April 2021 – October 2021 ===
Dates conducted	Polling firm	Margin of error	Sample size	Zelenskyy SN	Razumkov SN	Poroshenko YeS	Tymoshenko VOB	Boyko OPZZh	Medvedchuk OPZZh	Hrytsenko HP	Smeshko SiCh	Liashko RPOL	Vilkul Opoblok	Koshulynskyi Svoboda	Tyahnybok Svoboda	Rudik Holos	Klitschko UDAR	Groysman USH	Yatsenyuk NF	Murayev Nashi	Sadovyi Self Reliance	Others	Lead
23–27 Oct 2021	Razumkov	± 2.9 pp	1,200	28.0	8.2	19.0	7.5	9.3	2.5		4.8	3.0			2.1	0.4		6.1		4.6		4.5	9.0
21–23 Oct 2021	Rating	± 2.0 pp	2,500	25.1	7.3	14.1	10.1	9.5		4.3	7.1	3.9			2.0			5.1		6.0	1.5	4.2	11.0
15–18 Oct 2021	KIIS	± 2.7 pp	1,200	24.7	7.1	15.6	12.2	9.4	2.9		7.8	5.1			1.3	0.8		5.3		6.2		1.5	9.1
10–15 Oct 2021	KIIS	± 2.4 pp	2,002	33.3		16.8	10.3	9.5			8.7	4.6	0.8			0.0		5.7		6.4		3.9	16.5
3 Oct 2021	Release of the Offshore 95 anti-corruption investigation documentary exposing foreign assets of Volodymyr Zelenskyy																						
2–4 Oct 2021	Rating	± 2.0 pp	2,500	31.1	3.7	13.3	9.2	10.9			6.1	4.1			1.4	0.2		5.7	3.1	5.7		5.5	17.8
20 Jul – 9 Aug 2021	Rating	± 1.0 pp	2,000	27.2	3.0	14.9	9.7	10.5			6.6	3.8			2.1		1.6	5.1		5.6	2.7	7.2	12.3
29 Jul – 4 Aug 2021	Razumkov	± 2.3 pp	2,019	28.8	2.3	15.9	10.9	14.6		1.7	5.9	2.8	0.9	2.6			0.9	2.7				10.2	12.9
29 Jul – 3 Aug 2021	SOCIS	?	2,000	25.8	3.7	18.9	8.9	8.9	4.1		8.9	1.6			1.3		1.6	5.5		5.2		6.3 (Note: Arsen Avakov – 1.3, Yevgeny Komarovsky – 0.9)	6.9
23–25 Jul 2021	Rating	± 2.0 pp	2,500	27.7	4.1	13.4	11.4	10.1			7.8	2.6			2.7	0.4		6.1	2.6	6.0		5.1	14.3
30 Jun – 3 Jul 2021	Rating	± 2.0 pp	2,500	29.1		13.4	11.3	12.5			8.7	3.4			2.4	0.2		4.6	2.6	5.5		6.3	15.7
25–30 Jun 2021	SOCIS	± 2.4 pp	2,000	28.8	4.1	18.4	8.5	7.9	3.4		10.3	1.9			1.2	0.7	1.9	4.2		3.9		4.8	10.4
11–16 Jun 2021	Razumkov	± 2.3 pp	2,018	32.4	2.2	17.2	9.8	13.0		2.9	7.0	1.8	1.0	2.2			1.4	3.7				5.4	15.2
1–7 Jun 2021	KIIS	± 2.4 pp	2,003	30.6		17.4	12.7	10.6			8.1	4.0	1.5			0.5		5.8		5.5		3.2	13.2
28 May – 3 Jun 2021	SOCIS	± 2.4 pp	2,000	28.1	2.4	16.7	12.2	9.2	4.0		9.6	2.0			1.5	0.3	1.1	4.4		4.0		4.3	11.4
27 May – 1 Jun 2021	KIIS	± 2.4 pp	2,000	27.3	3.1	14.6	11.9	9.2	4.3		9.5	3.8			1.7	0.8	1.8	4.6		5.7		1.8	12.7
14–19 May 2021	DIF/Razumkov	± 2.3 pp	2,020	31.0	1.8	18.6	11.7	12.7		3.3	5.7	2.1	1.1	2.2			1.1	2.8				5.9	12.4
16–18 May 2021	Rating	± 2.0 pp	2,500	30.2		12.8	11.1	11.9			7.6	3.0			1.6	0.1	2.4	4.8	1.9	5.1	3.4	4.1	17.4
22–29 Apr 2021	Razumkov	± 2.3 pp	2,021	28.3	2.4	18.1	10.5	14.5		2.2	6.2	2.6	1.1	1.9			1.1	3.3				7.8	10.2
16–22 Apr 2021	KIIS	± 2.4 pp	2,003	31.4		18.1	11.9	9.6			10.4	4.0	1.2			0.1		5.3		5.0		3.1	13.3
8–12 Apr 2021	SOCIS	± 2.4 pp	2,000	26.7	2.5	19.6	10.1	9.7	2.2		7.5	2.7			0.9	0.4	1.3	4.5		3.0		9.0	7.1
6–7 Apr 2021	Rating	± 2.0 pp	2,500	24.9	4.8	13.1	12.1	11.9			6.8	4.9			1.8	0.4		5.1	2.2	4.6	2.6	4.8	11.8

=== September 2020 – March 2021 ===
Dates conducted	Polling firm	Margin of error	Sample size	Zelenskyy SN	Razumkov SN	Poroshenko YeS	Tymoshenko VOB	Boyko OPZZh	Medvedchuk OPZZh	Hrytsenko HP	Smeshko SiCh	Liashko RPOL	Vilkul Opoblok	Koshulynskyi Svoboda	Tyahnybok Svoboda	Prytula Holos	Rudik Holos	Biletsky NK	Klitschko UDAR	Groysman USH	Shariy PSh	Palytsia ZM	Yatsenyuk NF	Murayev Nashi	Others	Lead
23–24 Mar 2021	Rating	± 2.0 pp	2,500	24.7	3.8	13.9	11.8	12.6		3.3	7.7	3.7			1.6		0.5			5.2			2.8	3.7	4.8	10.8
5–9 Mar 2021	Razumkov	± 2.3 pp	2,018	27.4	2.0	19.7	10.1	17.1		1.7	6.3	2.4	0.9	2.8					0.9	3.3					5.3	7.7
2–3 Mar 2021	Rating	± 2.0 pp	2,500	22.5	4.2	14.6	11.3	11.6			8.0	4.4			1.5		0.3		1.7	6.6			2.9	4.6	5.7	7.9
23 Feb – 1 Mar 2021	KIIS	± 2.9 pp	1,207	25.3	4.0	14.0	11.9	14.7	3.8		8.4	4.1			1.9		0.1	0.6	3.0	5.4		0.2			2.6	10.6
23 Feb – 1 Mar 2021	KIIS	± 2.9 pp	1,207	24.0	4.3	14.0	12.6	16.7			8.6	4.9			2.2		0.4	0.7	3.0	4.9		0.2			3.4	7.3
19–28 Feb 2021	SMC	± 1.5 pp	3,017	24.6	3.0	15.1	11.1		16.3	2.9	5.2	3.2			1.4			0.4	1.6	4.4			1.2		5.3	8.3
19–28 Feb 2021	SMC	± 1.5 pp	3,017	24.7	3.2	15.5	11.0	18.1		3.0	5.8	2.8			1.5			0.7	1.9	4.7			1.6		2.7	6.6
22–23 Feb 2021	Rating	± 2.0 pp	2,500	23.1	5.3	14.4	10.9	11.3			7.2	4.1			2.4		0.5		2.4	5.7			2.9	4.9	4.8	8.7
11–16 Feb 2021	KIIS/SOCIS	± 1.8 pp	3,000	25.6	3.5	19.4	11.7	11.1	3.5		8.2	3.8			0.9		0.3		1.3	5.5	2.6				2.8	6.2
5–7 Feb 2021	KIIS	± 2.4 pp	2,005	22.7	3.3	18.3	14.5	11.4	5.1	4.1	8.2		1.7						1.9	4.5					4.4 (Note: Artem Sytnyk – 0.1)	4.4
21 Jan – 5 Feb 2021	Info Sapiens	± 3.1 pp	1,003	28.8		20.4	12.0	18.2	2.7		4.0	4.2			0.5	2.0			0.5	3.5					3.5	8.4
2–3 Feb 2021	Rating	± 2.2 pp	2,000	21.2	3.2	16.4	12.3	17.1			7.5	4.0			2.1	3.1			1.1	4.3					7.7	4.1
1–3 Feb 2021	Info Sapiens	± 2.2 pp	2,012	22.2	2.9	15.5	13.3	16.3			7.3	4.8		3.5		3.4				5.3					5.5	5.9
29 Jan – 3 Feb 2021	Razumkov	± 2.3 pp	2,019	23.1	2.1	17.8	11.2	19.9		3.4	4.9	2.8	1.5	1.6					1.2	3.1					7.4	3.2
27 Jan – 1 Feb 2021	KIIS	± 0.95 pp	1,205	22.1	4.0	13.7	11.2	13.5	7.9			4.8	1.5		2.6	4.5		0.4		5.5		1.2			5.5	8.4
27 Jan – 1 Feb 2021	KIIS	± 0.95 pp	1,205	22.1		13.1	10.6	17.5			8.8	4.7	1.8		2.9	4.8		0.4	1.8	5.6		1.2			4.7	4.6
15–25 Jan 2021	SMC	± 1.5 pp	3,014	25.6		15.2	11.5		15.5	3.3	6.4	3.6			2.2			1.1	2.0	3.6			0.9		5.4	10.1
15–25 Jan 2021	SMC	± 1.5 pp	3,014	24.8		15.6	11.1	18.4		3.2	6.2	3.9			2.2			1.0	1.9	3.4			0.8		4.2	6.4
22 Jan 2021	KIIS	± 0.95 pp	1,005	19.8		15.7	11.8	11.0	7.5		8.9		0.9		2.1	2.5	0.3		0.9	5.8	4.2		3.4		5.3	4.1
2–4 Jan 2021	Rating	± 2.0 pp	2,500	26.2		13.3	10.5	16.6			6.4	4.7			2.6	4.1			2.3	6.1					7.3	9.6
17–23 Dec 2020	KIIS	± 0.95 pp	1,200	27.0	3.4	13.7	7.5	14.7	8.7			6.3	1.2		1.7	4.1		1.2	2.2	5.5		0.8			2.2	12.3
17–23 Dec 2020	KIIS	± 0.95 pp	1,200	27.7		14.2	7.3	20.8			6.5	6.2	1.2		0.8	3.8		0.8	1.6	6.0		1.3			1.9	6.9
16–20 Dec 2020	Rating	± 2.2 pp	2,000	26.5	4.1	14.3	9.8	10.1	7.7		6.0	3.6			2.2	2.9			2.2	6.4					4.2	12.2
4–9 Nov 2020	Razumkov	± 2.3 pp	2,018	28.0	2.5	19.3	7.7	17.2		3.0	5.8	1.6	0.9	1.9					1.5	4.1					6.4	8.7
30 Oct – 5 Nov 2020	Razumkov	± 2.3 pp	2,020	31.2		21.1	8.3	16.9			5.6	2.1	1.1	2.8											10.8	10.1
28 Oct – 2 Nov 2020	SOCIS	?	2,000	33.7		18.4	8.2	14.9			6.8	4.4			1.1						2.1				10.3	15.3
17–24 Oct 2020	KIIS	± 2.6 pp	1,502	33.3		17.3	11.1	10.5	8.8		9.5	4.6					0.4								4.4	16.0
18–28 Sep 2020	SOCIS	± 2.2 pp	2,000	30.1		18.9	7.4	14.0			8.5	2.8						0.9			3.9				13.4	11.2
12–16 Sep 2020	KIIS	± 2.2 pp	2,000	31.8		18.9	9.8	13.3		4.9	6.8	6.0	2.3				0.0								6.1	12.9
3–6 Sep 2020	Rating	± 2.2 pp	2,000	29.0	2.7	14.0	9.3	15.5			6.4	3.6			1.9	3.6			0.7	3.6					7.3	13.5

=== February 2020 – July 2020 ===
Dates conducted	Polling firm	Margin of error	Sample size	Zelenskyy SN	Razumkov SN	Poroshenko YeS	Tymoshenko VOB	Boyko OPZZh	Medvedchuk OPZZh	Hrytsenko HP	Smeshko SiCh	Liashko RPOL	Vilkul Opoblok	Koshulynskyi Svoboda	Tyahnybok Svoboda	Vakarchuk Holos	Prytula Holos	Biletsky NK	Klitschko UDAR	Groysman USH	Shariy PSh	Others	Lead
21–28 Jul 2020	SOCIS	?	4,000	33.4		17.8	8.8	15.7			7.0	2.9						1.0			2.9	10.5	15.6
15–20 Jul 2020	Rating	± 2.2 pp	2,000	30.2	2.1	13.7	9.1	14.4		3.0	5.8	3.9			2.2	1.6			0.8	3.1		8.3 (Note: Andrii Portnov – 2.3, Oleksandr Yefremov – 0.8)	15.8
3–9 Jul 2020	Razumkov	± 2.3 pp	2,022	36.8		15.3	7.8	17.2		3.4	4.5	1.9	1.3	1.6								10.2	19.6
24–30 Jun 2020	SOCIS	?	2,000	36.6		20.9	6.9	16.0			6.9	2.8						0.9				8.9 (Note: Olena Zerkal – 3.1, Oleg Sentsov – 2.2)	15.7
24–28 Jun 2020	Rating	± 2.2 pp	2,000	34.6		11.4	7.2	11.2	3.0	3.0	6.7	3.4			1.2		3.2			2.8	2.5	8.6 (Note: Serhiy Tihipko – 0.7)	23.2
17–24 Jun 2020	Razumkov	± 2.3 pp	2,017	34.6		16.1	7.7	20.0		3.1	4.2	1.2	1.6	1.9								9.7	14.6
24 May – 4 Jun 2020	KIIS	± 0.95 pp	4,000	37.6		16.2	8.7	13.2		4.4	6.8	4.4	2.0			3.0						3.6	21.4
22–29 May 2020	SOCIS	± 2.1 pp	2,000	41.1		15.2	7.4	14.5			6.0	2.3				2.0		0.8				10.7 (Note: Olena Zerkal – 2.0, Oleg Sentsov – 1.9)	25.9
12–13 May 2020	Rating	± 1.8 pp	3,000	39.3		13.3	8.6	13.9		3.6	5.9	2.4			1.7	2.1			0.4			8.7 (Note: Andriy Sadovyi – 2.5)	25.4
26–30 Apr 2020	KIIS	± 0.95 pp	1,507	40.9		15.7	8.7	8.9	6.4		9.2	4.0				1.5						4.8	25.2
24–29 Apr 2020	Razumkov	± 2.3 pp	2,056	41.5		12.8	5.4	10.8		3.5	6.0	2.3										14.1	28.7
17–25 Apr 2020	KIIS	± 1.7 pp	4,024	42.6		14.9	9.7	12.2		4.3	6.4	3.5	0.8			1.8						3.7	27.7
13–23 Mar 2020	SOCIS	± 2.1 pp	2,000	51.3		15.0	6.5	11.2			5.5	2.9				1.0		0.4				6.7 (Note: Olena Zerkal – 2.3, Oleg Sentsov – 1.4)	36.3
8–18 Feb 2020	KIIS	± 3.3 pp	2,038	44.2		11.6	6.9	13.1		3.3	4.9	4.0	1.9	2.5								6.5 (Note: Roman Bezsmertnyi – 1.1, Oleksandr Moroz – 0.8, Yurii Karmazin – 0.7, Yuri Tymoshenko – 0.6)	31.1
13–17 Feb 2020	Razumkov	± 2.3 pp	2,018	40.1		13.5	10.2	15.3		3.3	4.2	3.3	1.2	2.1								6.7 (Note: Oleksandr Shevchenko – 0.2)	24.8
1–10 Feb 2020	SOCIS	± 2.1 pp	2,000	48.7		12.2	9.5	11.8			4.9	3.0				2.4		1.1				6.8 (Note: Olena Zerkal – 2.0, Oleg Sentsov – 1.4)	36.5
31 Mar 2019	2019 election			30.24		15.95	13.40	11.67		6.91	6.04	5.48	4.15	1.62								4.54	14.29

== Second round ==
=== Zelenskyy v Poroshenko ===
Dates conducted	Polling firm	Margin of error	Sample size	Zelenskyy SN	Poroshenko YeS	Lead
28 Jul – 2 Aug 2026	SOCIS	± 2.6 pp	2,000	64.8	35.2	29.6
12–18 Dec 2025	SOCIS	± 2.6 pp	2,000	67.8	32.2	35.6
10–16 Oct 2025	SOCIS	± 2.0 pp	2,000	68.6	31.4	37.2
3–9 Feb 2025	SOCIS	?	2,000	66.5	33.5	33.0
5–11 Dec 2024	SOCIS	?	2,000	66.7	33.3	33.4

=== Zelenskyy v Razumkov ===
Dates conducted	Polling firm	Margin of error	Sample size	Zelenskyy SN	Razumkov RP	Lead
3–9 Feb 2025	SOCIS	?	2,000	67.9	32.1	35.8

=== Zelenskyy v Zaluzhnyi ===
Dates conducted	Polling firm	Margin of error	Sample size	Zelenskyy SN	Zaluzhnyi Independent	Lead
28 Jul – 2 Aug 2026	SOCIS	± 2.6 pp	2,000	33.8	66.2	32.4
12–18 Dec 2025	SOCIS	± 2.6 pp	2,600	35.8	64.2	28.4
10–16 Oct 2025	SOCIS	± 2.0 pp	2,000	34.4	65.6	31.2
6–11 Jun 2025	SOCIS	± 2.6 pp	2,000	39.5	60.5	21.0
3–9 Feb 2025	SOCIS	?	2,000	25.1	74.9	49.8
5–11 Dec 2024	SOCIS	?	2,000	31.6	68.4	36.8
22 Feb – 1 Mar 2024	SOCIS	± 2.1 pp	3,000	32.5	67.5	35.0
3–7 Nov 2023	Rating	± 2.2 pp	2,000	51.2	48.8	2.4

=== Zelenskyy v Budanov ===
Dates conducted	Polling firm	Margin of error	Sample size	Zelenskyy SN	Budanov Independent	Lead
28 Jul – 2 Aug 2026	SOCIS	± 2.6 pp	2,000	39.7	60.3	20.6
12–18 Dec 2025	SOCIS	± 2.6 pp	2,000	43.8	56.2	12.4
10–16 Oct 2025	SOCIS	± 2.0 pp	2,000	45.0	55.0	10.0
3–9 Feb 2025	SOCIS	?	2,000	53.4	46.6	6.8

=== Zelenskyy v Biletsky ===
Dates conducted	Polling firm	Margin of error	Sample size	Zelenskyy SN	Biletsky NK	Lead
28 Jul – 2 Aug 2026	SOCIS	± 2.6 pp	2,000	56.8	43.2	13.6
12–18 Dec 2025	SOCIS	± 2.6 pp	2,000	59.5	40.5	19.0
10–16 Oct 2025	SOCIS	± 2.0 pp	2,000	59.6	40.4	19.2

=== Zelenskyy v Fedorov ===
Dates conducted	Polling firm	Margin of error	Sample size	Zelenskyy SN	Fedorov Independent	Lead
28 Jul – 2 Aug 2026	SOCIS	± 2.6 pp	2,000	36.3	63.7	27.4

== Pre-2022 invasion second round polls ==
=== Zelenskyy v Razumkov ===
Dates conducted	Polling firm	Margin of error	Sample size	Zelenskyy SN	Razumkov RP	Lead
17–22 Dec 2021	DIF & Razumkov Centre	± 2.3 pp	2,018	43.6	56.4	12.8
9–17 Dec 2021	KIIS	± 3.3 pp	2,025	53.2	46.8	6.4
28 Nov – 10 Dec 2021	SMC	± 1.0 pp	10,000	47.4	52.6	5.2
11–17 Nov 2021	Razumkov Centre	± 2.3 pp	2,018	49.6	50.4	0.8

=== Zelenskyy v Poroshenko ===
Dates conducted	Polling firm	Margin of error	Sample size	Zelenskyy SN	Poroshenko YeS	Lead
11–16 Feb 2022	SOCIS	± 2.4 pp	2,000	51	49	2
17–22 Dec 2021	DIF & Razumkov Centre	± 2.3 pp	2,018	49.9	50.1	0.2
9–17 Dec 2021	KIIS	± 3.3 pp	2,025	55.7	44.3	11.4
28 Nov – 10 Dec 2021	SMC	± 1.0 pp	10,000	57.4	42.6	14.8
11–17 Nov 2021	Razumkov Centre	± 2.3 pp	2,018	54	46	8
10–13 Nov 2021	Rating	± 2.0 pp	2,500	59	41	18
23–27 Oct 2021	Razumkov Centre	± 2.9 pp	1,200	55.6	44.4	11.2
29 Jul – 4 Aug 2021	Razumkov Centre	± 2.3 pp	2,019	60.7	39.3	21.4
30 Jun – 3 Jul 2021	Rating	± 2.0 pp	2,500	65	35	30
25–30 Jun 2021	SOCIS	± 2.4 pp	2,000	60	40	20
11–16 Jun 2021	Razumkov Centre	± 2.3 pp	2,018	60.4	39.6	20.8
14–19 May 2021	DIF & Razumkov Centre	± 2.3 pp	2,020	60	40	20
16–18 May 2021	Rating	± 2.0 pp	2,500	68	32	36
22–29 Apr 2021	Razumkov Centre	± 2.3 pp	2,021	60.5	39.5	21.0
8–12 Apr 2021	SOCIS	± 2.4 pp	2,000	56.3	43.7	12.6
6–7 Apr 2021	Rating	± 2.0 pp	2,500	64	36	28
13–21 Mar 2021	Rating & IRI	± 2.0 pp	2,400	72	24	48
5–9 Mar 2021	Razumkov Centre	± 2.3 pp	2,018	57.2	42.8	14.4
11–16 Feb 2021	KIIS & SOCIS	± 1.8 pp	3,000	56.4	43.6	12.8
2–3 Feb 2021	Rating	± 2.2 pp	2,000	56	44	12
29 Jan – 3 Feb 2021	Razumkov Centre	± 2.3 pp	2,019	54	46	8
22 Jan 2021	KIIS	± 0.95 pp	1,005	55.2	44.8	10.4
4–9 Dec 2020	Razumkov Centre	± 2.3 pp	2,018	57	43	14
28 Oct – 2 Nov 2020	SOCIS	?	2,000	58	42	16
21–28 Jul 2020	SOCIS	?	4,000	68.4	31.6	36.8
3–9 Jul 2020	Razumkov Centre	± 2.3 pp	2,022	71.5	28.5	43.0
24–30 Jun 2020	SOCIS	?	2,000	65.4	34.6	30.8
17–24 Jun 2020	Razumkov Centre	± 2.3 pp	2,017	69.8	30.2	39.6
24–29 May 2020	SOCIS	± 2.1 pp	2,000	51.1	18.3	32.8
12–13 May 2020	Rating	± 1.8 pp	3,000	75	25	50
1–10 Feb 2020z	SOCIS	± 2.1 pp	2,000	47.9	15.8	32.1
21 Apr 2019	2019 election			73.2	24.5	48.7

=== Zelenskyy v Boyko ===
Dates conducted	Polling firm	Margin of error	Sample size	Zelenskyy SN	Boyko OPZZh	Lead
17–22 Dec 2021	DIF & Razumkov Centre	± 2.3 pp	2,018	63.1	36.9	26.2
9–17 Dec 2021	KIIS	± 3.3 pp	2,025	60.2	39.8	20.4
28 Nov – 10 Dec 2021	SMC	± 1.0 pp	10,000	57.1	42.9	14.2
11–17 Nov 2021	Razumkov Centre	± 2.3 pp	2,018	66.3	33.7	32.6
10–13 Nov 2021	Rating	± 2.0 pp	2,500	62	38	24
29 Jul – 4 Aug 2021	Razumkov Centre	± 2.3 pp	2,019	68	32	36
30 Jun – 3 Jul 2021	Rating	± 2.0 pp	2,500	66	34	32
25–30 Jun 2021	SOCIS	± 2.4 pp	2,000	76	24	52
11–16 Jun 2021	Razumkov Centre	± 2.3 pp	2,018	75.7	24.3	51.4
14–19 May 2021	DIF & Razumkov Centre	± 2.3 pp	2,020	74	26	48
16–18 May 2021	Rating	± 2.0 pp	2,500	69	31	38
22–29 Apr 2021	Razumkov Centre	± 2.3 pp	2,021	70.9	29.1	41.8
8–12 Apr 2021	SOCIS	± 2.4 pp	2,000	72.9	27.1	45.8
6–7 Apr 2021	Rating	± 2.0 pp	2,500	67	33	34
5–9 Mar 2021	Razumkov Centre	± 2.3 pp	2,018	66.4	33.6	32.8
11–16 Feb 2021	KIIS & SOCIS	± 1.8 pp	3,000	61.3	38.7	22.6
2–3 Feb 2021	Rating	± 2.2 pp	2,000	60	40	20
29 Jan – 3 Feb 2021	Razumkov Centre	± 2.3 pp	2,019	58	42	16
4–9 Dec 2020	Razumkov Centre	± 2.3 pp	2,018	62	38	24
3–9 Jul 2020	Razumkov Centre	± 2.3 pp	2,022	68.2	31.8	36.4
12–13 May 2020	Rating	± 1.8 pp	3,000	75	25	50

=== Zelenskyy v Tymoshenko ===
Dates conducted	Polling firm	Margin of error	Sample size	Zelenskyy SN	Tymoshenko VOB	Lead
17–22 Dec 2021	DIF & Razumkov Centre	± 2.3 pp	2,018	53.5	46.5	7.0
9–17 Dec 2021	KIIS	± 3.3 pp	2,025	51.6	48.4	3.2
28 Nov – 10 Dec 2021	SMC	± 1.0 pp	10,000	55.1	44.9	10.2
10–13 Nov 2021	Rating	± 2.0 pp	2,500	59	41	18
30 Jun – 3 Jul 2021	Rating	± 2.0 pp	2,500	61	39	22
16–18 May 2021	Rating	± 2.0 pp	2,500	62	38	24
6–7 Apr 2021	Rating	± 2.0 pp	2,500	57	43	14
2–3 Feb 2021	Rating	± 2.2 pp	2,000	55	45	10
12–13 May 2020	Rating	± 1.8 pp	3,000	74	26	48

=== Poroshenko v Tymoshenko ===
Dates conducted	Polling firm	Margin of error	Sample size	Poroshenko YeS	Tymoshenko VOB	Lead
9–17 Dec 2021	KIIS	± 3.3 pp	2,025	45.2	54.8	9.6
6–7 Apr 2021	Rating	± 2.0 pp	2,500	41	59	18

=== Poroshenko v Boyko ===
Dates conducted	Polling firm	Margin of error	Sample size	Poroshenko YeS	Boyko OPZZh	Lead
25–30 Jun 2021	SOCIS	± 2.4 pp	2,000	60	40	20
8–12 Apr 2021	SOCIS	± 2.4 pp	2,000	64.4	35.6	28.8
6–7 Apr 2021	Rating	± 2.0 pp	2,500	49	51	2
5–9 Mar 2021	Razumkov Centre	± 2.3 pp	2,018	58	42	16
11–16 Feb 2021	KIIS & SOCIS	± 1.8 pp	3,000	52.7	47.3	5.4
2–3 Feb 2021	Rating	± 2.2 pp	2,000	49	51	2
29 Jan – 3 Feb 2021	Razumkov Centre	± 2.3 pp	2,019	54.2	45.8	8.4
22 Jan 2021	KIIS	± 0.95 pp	1,005	47	53	6
4–9 Dec 2020	Razumkov Centre	± 2.3 pp	2,018	54.3	45.7	8.6

=== Poroshenko v Razumkov ===
Dates conducted	Polling firm	Margin of error	Sample size	Poroshenko YeS	Razumkov RP	Lead
17–22 Dec 2021	DIF & Razumkov Centre	± 2.3 pp	2,018	38.9	61.1	22.2

== See also ==
- Opinion polling for the next Ukrainian parliamentary election
- Opinion polling for the 2019 Ukrainian presidential election
