= Opinion polling for the next Ukrainian parliamentary election =

In the run up to the next Ukrainian parliamentary election, various organisations carried out opinion polling to gauge voter intention in Ukraine. The results of the polls are displayed in this article. The date range for these opinion polls are from the 2019 Ukrainian parliamentary election, held on 21 July, to the day of the next election.

== Credibility of polling firms ==
In Ukraine, there are many unknown and unregistered polling firms. They can suddenly establish and then disappear, be influenced by certain politicians, manipulate questions and the sample. These pseudo-organizations make up opinion polls in the interests of certain politicians and parties, especially Viktor Medvedchuk and OPZZh.

There is a whole database Sellers of ratings of the independent edition Texty, which includes 119 organizations and 220 individuals who have been spotted in the publication of dubious opinion polls or in the hidden PR of politicians. For each of them there is a certificate and history of their activities. There are also separately published the names of real companies with a positive reputation. An important criterion of professional organization is membership in the Sociological Association of Ukraine (SAU).

As of January 2022, the following organizations are accredited members of the SAU:

- Oleksandr Yaremenko Ukrainian Institute for Social Research
- Vasyl Karazin Kharkiv National University
- East Ukrainian Foundation for Social Research
- Kyiv International Institute of Sociology (KIIS)
- GfK Ukraine
- Oleksandr Razumkov Ukrainian Center for Economic and Political Studies (Razumkov Centre)
- Kantar Ukraine
- SOCIS Center for Social and Marketing Research (SOCIS)
- Rating Group Ukraine (Rating)
- FAMA Sociological Agency
- Social Monitoring Center (SMC)

In 2018, GfK Ukraine employees founded a new company – Info Sapiens.

Ilko Kucheriv Democratic Initiatives Foundation (DIF) also publishes objective data, but it is not a polling firm in the classical sense, but acts as a mediator between the public and polling firms.

== Graphical summary ==
The chart below shows opinion polls conducted for the next Ukrainian parliamentary election until the start of the Russian invasion. The trend lines are local regressions (LOESS).

== Poll results ==
The table below shows the poll results of accredited members of the Sociological Association of Ukraine and the poll results of the Ilko Kucheriv Democratic Initiatives Foundation (DIF), which are sorted in reverse chronological order. The percentages that overcome the 5% electoral threshold are displayed in bold and the background of the highest percentages is shaded in the leading party's colour. The "lead" column shows the percentage point difference between the two parties with the highest figures. When the poll result is a tie, all figures with the highest percentages are shaded.

=== Since August 2022 ===
Dates conducted	Polling firm	Sample size	Servant of the People	Platform for Life and Peace	Batkivshchyna	European Solidarity	Holos (political party)	Radical Party of Oleh Liashko	Ukrainian Strategy of Groysman	Svoboda (political party)	National Corps	Ukrainian Democratic Alliance for Reform	24 August	Smart Politics (Ukraine)	Party of Zaluzhnyi	Party of Arestovych	Party of Budanov	Party of Prokopenko Azov	Party of Usyk	Party of Goncharenko	Party of Mayors	Party of Khartiia	Others	Lead
8–23 Aug 2026	Info Sapiens	1,000	**16.1**	0.7	2.4	7.6		2.5		2.3	3.7	0.2	1.5	4.5	14.1		**7.5**	4.0	**5.3**	3.4	**5.7**	1.7	16.7 (Note: Party of Mykhailo Fedorov – 13.3, Party of Free People - 2.9)	2.0
28 Jul – 2 Aug 2026	SOCIS	2,000	**12.7**	2.8	4.0	7.0					3.6		2.3	**6.7**	19.4		**9.7**	3.4			**6.7**		21.7 (Note: Party of Mykhailo Fedorov – 17.9)	1.5
12–19 Jun 2026	Info Sapiens	1,000	**16.7**	0.7	3.8	8.0		1.8		2.7	4.8	0.3	3.4	**5.6**	13.9		**10.4**	3.9	**8.0**	3.7	**8.3**	2.8	1.4	2.8
30 May – 3 Jun 2026	Rating	2,404	**16**	2	3	8				3		1	3	**5**	18		**12**	**8**			4		1	2
12–18 Mar 2026	SOCIS	1,204	**11.5**	1.3	2.1	8.9	0.7	1.8		2.2	4.9	1.1	1.9	3.7	21.0		**15.3**	**6.0**			**13.7**		3.8 (Note: For the Future (political party) – 0.9)	5.7
17–26 Dec 2025	Info Sapiens	1,000	**16.1**		3.8	6.1	0.2	2.1	1.3	0.5	3.5	0.9	2.1	**5.3**	18.4		**6.0**	**5.5**	4.6			2.3	1.0 (Note: Strong Ukraine – 0.5)	2.3
12–18 Dec 2025	SOCIS	2,600	**16.8**	3.3	**6.6**	8.6					**6.1**		2.6	**5.6**	29.6		**10.5**	4.9			4.0		1.5	12.8
26 Nov – 13 Dec 2025	KIIS	547	**11.3**	1.1	**5.0**	16.2				1.9	**11.9**		**6.4**	**8.7**	19.9	1.1	**10.4**	**5.0**					1.0	3.7
10–16 Oct 2025	SOCIS	2,000	**21.3**	2.1	4.8	8.8					**6.5**	2.2	3.6	4.5	27.8		**7.4**	3.5					7.3 (Note: Strong Ukraine – 1.8)	6.5
2–14 Sep 2025	KIIS	1,023	**14.0**	1.9	3.5	11.4				2.9	**11.0**		4.8	**5.4**	23.5	1.3	**6.7**	**12.8**						9.5
21–23 Aug 2025	Rating	1,600	**19.7**	1.6	3.6	7.4				2.1	**5.9**	0.8	3.3	3.7	23.7	0.9	**6.4**						3.3	4.0
22–27 Jul 2025	Rating	2,400	**14**	2	3	8				3	**8**	1	**5**	**5**	22	1	**8**						2	8
6–11 Jun 2025	SOCIS	2,000	**19.0**	2.6	4.8	7.5				2.8	**6.0**	1.1	4.8	**5.6**	30.1		**6.9**	4.9					3.9	11.1
15 May – 3 Jun 2025	KIIS	1,011	**16.6**	2.0	2.7	10.2				2.8			**7.0**	**5.2**	25.3	1.2	**6.1**	**19.9**					0.8	5.4
14–23 Mar 2025	SOCIS	2,000	**11.3**		3.6	5.6					3.4	1.1	2.6	3.8	21.9									10.6
14 Feb – 4 Mar 2025	KIIS	1,029	**14.4**	1.7	3.8	7.9				1.9			**6.3**	**5.3**	28.4	1.5	**8.5**	**19.2**					0.9	9.2
4–9 Feb 2025	KIIS	1,000	**12.4**	2.2	3.7	7.9				2.0			**5.1**	**6.1**	36.2	2.3	4.5	**17.1**					0.5	19.1
3–9 Feb 2025	SOCIS	2,000	**10.2**		3.1	6.3					4.4	0.9	3.0	4.1	27.1		3.8							16.9
2–17 Dec 2024	KIIS	985	**11.8**	3.0	3.8	9.6				2.8			**6.2**	**6.3**	33.2	0.7	**5.6**	**16.5**					0.5	16.7
15–21 Nov 2024	SMC	1,200	**12**	2	**6**	9	1	1			4	3	**6**	**6**	34	1	**7**						3	22
22 Feb – 1 Mar 2024	SOCIS	3,000	**21.1**		3.6	7.5					1.7	1.4	**7.0**	**6.8**	46.4	1.5							3.2	25.3
3–7 Nov 2023	Rating	2,000	**32.2** (Note: Party of Volodymyr Zelenskyy – 26.7, Servant of the People – 5.5)		1.9	5.4			0.8	1.3	**5.8**	1.3	**7.6**	2.7	36.0	1.0				1.4			2.7 (Note: Party of Yuriy Butusov – 0.9)	3.8

=== October 2021 – July 2022 ===
Dates conducted	Polling firm	Sample size	Servant of the People	Opposition Platform — For Life	Batkivshchyna	European Solidarity	Holos (political party)	Radical Party of Oleh Liashko	Strength and Honor	Opposition Bloc (2019)	Nashi (political party)	Ukrainian Strategy of Groysman	Party of Shariy	Svoboda (political party)	National Corps	Civil Position	Self Reliance (political party)	For the Future (political party)	Proposition (political party)	Ukrainian Democratic Alliance for Reform	Our Land (Ukraine)	People's Front (Ukraine)	Ukraine is Our Home	24 August	Smart Politics (Ukraine)	Others	Lead
8 Jun – 12 Jul 2022	Banning of 16 pro-Russian parties, including OPZZh, OB, Nashi, PSh and SPU																										
24–28 Mar 2022	Info Sapiens	1,000	52.0	~~1.3~~	5.2	12.6	0.6	0.6	**5.2**	~~0.5~~	~~0.9~~	1.2	~~0.8~~	0.7		0.2		0.5	0.4	3.1				**9.5**	3.9	0.8	39.4
20 Mar 2022	11 pro-Russian parties including OPZZh, OB, Nashi and PSh are suspended by the National Security and Defense Council for the period of martial law due to their ties to Russia																										
24 Feb 2022	Beginning of Russian invasion of Ukraine																										
21 Feb 2022	Russia officially recognizes independence of Donetsk People's Republic and Luhansk People's Republic																										
16–21 Feb 2022	Info Sapiens	2,076	19.2	**9.6**	10.5	17.1	1.3	4.0	**6.3**		3.8	**5.8**	2.5	3.5				1.6	0.5	1.2				**7.9**	**5.3**	0.0	2.1
11–18 Feb 2022	Rating	4,800	19.6	**9.5**	11.5	17.7		3.9	**7.6**		**5.4**	4.8		3.2						3.1		3.2			**6.7**	3.9	1.9
8–18 Feb 2022	UIF	2,400	20	**13**	12	17	1	3	**6**		**5**	4	2	2				1	0.5	2				4	**8**	1	3
11–16 Feb 2022	SOCIS	2,000	16.2	**10.7**	10.0	23.2	2.1	2.3	**7.1**		**6.3**	**6.2**	1.8	3.2						1.5					**8.5**	0.9	7.0
12–13 Feb 2022	Rating	2,000	18.3	**9.7**	10.8	17.1	1.7	4.7	**5.2**		**5.5**	4.0	3.4	2.8			1.1			2.8				**5.3**	**5.9**	1.8	1.2
5–13 Feb 2022	KIIS	2,000	16.4	**10.1**	11.5	22.9	0.7	4.3	**5.1**		**6.2**	3.8	2.8	2.5	0.9		1.4	0.9	0.8	2.2			0.1		**5.8**	1.6	6.5
28–31 Jan 2022	Razumkov	1,206	18.4	**9.0**	12.6	25.2	2.3	1.8	4.8		**5.3**	3.2	1.7	2.2						2.2					**8.7**	2.7	6.8
20–21 Jan 2022	KIIS	1,205	13.7	**11.6**	13.3	18.9	1.6	4.6	**7.4**		**5.5**	4.7	2.8	3.1						4.5					**7.6**	1.0	5.2
17–22 Dec 2021	DIF/Razumkov	2,018	20.4	**9.9**	10.6	17.3	1.0	1.9	**6.7**	0.4	**5.2**	4.4	0.7	3.3		0.6		0.6	0.2	1.6	0.2				**10.5**	2.4	3.1
16–18 Dec 2021	Rating	2,500	19.2	**10.5**	11.1	14.1	2.2	4.2	**6.5**		**5.7**	**6.8**	2.6	3.5			1.6			4.0					**6.0**	2.2	5.1
9–17 Dec 2021	KIIS	2,025	17.6	**13.6**	13.7	16.5	1.6	3.4	**5.5**		4.4	4.6	1.8	1.9						2.3		1.9		3.5	**6.5**	1.2	1.1
14–16 Dec 2021	Rating	2,000	19.1	**10.5**	11.2	13.5	1.9	4.2	**7.3**		**5.6**	**6.0**	3.4	3.0			1.7			3.8					**6.2**	2.5	5.6
13–16 Dec 2021	KIIS	1,203	17.4	**12.5**	11.5	15.4	1.3	**5.0**	**6.4**		4.9	**5.8**	2.5	4.9						3.7					**7.6**	1.2	2.0
11–16 Dec 2021	SOCIS	2,000	17.9	**11.5**	12.2	18.1	2.2	1.9	**6.2**		**5.3**	**5.2**	2.6	**5.3**						2.1					**8.1**	1.3	0.2
3–11 Dec 2021	KIIS	2,000	18.4	**9.0**	9.1	19.8	1.7	**5.2**	**7.0**		4.4	**5.1**	4.0	3.3	0.9		1.5	1.3	0.5	2.6			0.2		4.8	1.1	1.4
28 Nov – 10 Dec 2021	UIF	2,400	19	**13**	14	16	1	2	**5**		**5**	4	2	2				2	0.1	2				3	**9**	1.1 (Note: Triumph of Palchevskyy – 0.1)	3
28 Nov – 10 Dec 2021	SMC	10,000	19.2	**12.8**	10.3	15.3	1.0	2.5	**6.1**		**6.8**	3.7	1.4	2.6				0.8	0.4	1.4	0.6	0.7	0.0		**7.7**	0.9 (Note: Agrarian Party – 0.3)	3.9
6–8 Dec 2021	Rating	2,500	18.0	**11.4**	11.4	13.7	1.8	4.0	**6.0**		**5.2**	**6.2**	3.1	3.0			2.1			4.2					**7.5**	2.3	4.3
26–29 Nov 2021	KIIS	1,203	15.0	**9.2**	13.3	17.1	1.8	**5.4**	**6.7**		**5.3**	**5.7**	2.7	2.8						4.5			0.2		**9.9**	0.3	2.1
11–17 Nov 2021	Razumkov	2,018	22.7	**12.7**	8.8	18.8	0.2	2.9	**5.7**	0.2	4.3	4.4	0.7	3.5		1.5		0.1	0.3	1.0	0.5			2.4	**7.0**	2.6	3.9
10–13 Nov 2021	Rating	2,500	18.0	**10.7**	10.1	13.9	1.7	4.5	**6.4**		**5.5**	**5.0**	3.1	2.1			1.6	1.5		3.7	1.1	1.8			**7.9**	1.6	4.1
4–9 Nov 2021	Rating	5,000	17.3	**11.0**	12.2	14.0	1.4	4.8	**5.8**		4.9	**5.2**	3.2	3.3			1.7	2.1		3.1	1.1				**6.8**	2.0	3.3
8 Nov 2021	Ex-chairman of the Verkhovna Rada Dmytro Razumkov announces the creation of the political group Smart Politics																										
29 Oct – 4 Nov 2021	SOCIS	2,000	23.8	**12.3**	10.9	18.5	2.3	2.0	**6.6**		**5.3**	4.7	2.9	3.4						1.3					**5.7**	0.9	5.3
23 Oct – 2 Nov 2021	UIF	2,400	18	**16**	16	15	1	2	**7**		**6**	4	3	3				2	0.4	2				3		2.5 (Note: Triumph of Palchevskyy – 0.5)	3
25–29 Oct 2021	KIIS	2,028	18.3	**17.0**	15.4	15.1	1.7	4.5	**5.6**		2.3	3.7	2.2	2.7				1.2	0.3	2.6	0.7		0.2		4.5	2.0 (Note: Dovira – 0.9)	1.3
23–27 Oct 2021	Razumkov	1,200	22.5	**11.3**	10.8	18.6	1.5	3.2	**5.4**		4.7	**6.9**	1.8	2.4									0.5		**8.2**	2.7	3.9
21–23 Oct 2021	Rating	2,500	20.4	**12.0**	10.9	15.8	2.2	4.8	**6.4**		**6.3**	**5.3**	3.8	2.9			1.9			4.2						3.3	4.6
14–20 Oct 2021	Razumkov	2,018	21.6	**12.9**	11.1	15.8	0.4	2.5	**6.0**	0.4	**6.4**	3.8	1.7	2.0		2.9		0.4	0.1	1.1	0.7			2.2		8.0	5.8
15–18 Oct 2021	KIIS	1,200	15.5	**13.0**	13.6	15.7	1.6	**5.6**	**8.6**		**5.7**	**5.6**	3.6	4.4				1.8	1.2	2.4			1.1			0.7	0.2
7 Oct 2021	Verkhovna Rada votes to dismiss Dmytro Razumkov from his post as Chairman of the Parliament																										

=== June 2021 – September 2021 ===
Dates conducted	Polling firm	Sample size	Servant of the People (political party)	Opposition Platform — For Life	Batkivshchyna	European Solidarity	Holos (political party)	Radical Party of Oleh Liashko	Strength and Honor (political party)	Opposition Bloc (2019)	Nashi (political party)	Ukrainian Strategy of Groysman	Party of Shariy	Svoboda (political party)	National Corps	Civil Position	Self Reliance (political party)	For the Future (political party)	Proposition (political party)	Ukrainian Democratic Alliance for Reform	Our Land (Ukraine)	People's Front (Ukraine)	Ukraine is Our Home	24 August	Others	Lead
18–28 Sep 2021	UIF	2,400	23	16	14	15	2	2	**7**		4	4	3	3				2	0.3	2				3	2.3 (Note: Triumph of Palchevskyy – 0.3)	7
16–21 Sep 2021	SOCIS	2,000	26.4	12.7	10.3	19.1	2.3	2.7	**7.7**	0.9	4.8	4.3	2.1	2.1				1.2	0.5						3.0	7.3
11–19 Sep 2021	SMC	3,010	24.7	17.1	11.2	15.9	1.6	2.7	**5.8**	0.7		4.8	1.1	2.4	0.6	2.1	0.7	1.3				0.7			2.5	7.6
10–15 Sep 2021	KIIS	2,002	20.0	11.6	10.8	17.4	0.6	**5.0**	**7.8**	**5.5**		**5.0**	3.5	1.8	1.0	2.8	2.0	1.0	0.6	2.1					1.5	2.6
2–4 Sep 2021	Rating	2,500	25.8	12.4	10.6	14.1	1.8	4.2	4.9		4.7	4.5	3.6	2.5				1.5		3.4			0.6	3.2	2.1	11.7
2–11 Aug 2021	SMC	3,012	24.9	16.2	12.6	15.2	0.9	2.8	**5.9**	0.9		4.7	1.3	2.8	0.8	2.4	0.6	1.1				1.1			1.4	8.7
29 Jul – 4 Aug 2021	Razumkov Centre	2,019	26.6	16.2	11.4	17.0	1.1	2.9	**5.9**	0.7		2.9	2.1	3.0		1.5		0.9	0.3	1.2	0.5				5.9	9.6
29 Jul – 3 Aug 2021	SOCIS	2,000	24.3	15.0	9.9	17.9	2.1	3.1	**7.4**	0.9	3.8	**5.7**	2.5	3.5				0.7	1.0						2.3	6.4
24 Jul – 1 Aug 2021	KIIS	2,028	20.2	18.3	16.0	14.2	2.1	4.0	**6.3**		1.8	4.7	2.3	3.6				1.6	0.6	2.8			0.3		1.1	1.9
23–25 Jul 2021	Rating	2,500	24.1	12.4	12.8	14.3	2.0	4.8	4.1		4.8	**5.0**	2.6	3.4			1.7	1.2		4.3					2.4	9.8
29 Jun – 9 Jul 2021	SMC	3,011	25.8	15.9	11.9	15.5	1.2	3.3	**5.8**	0.8		3.4	2.0	2.2	1.0	2.6	0.3	0.9				0.9			2.2	9.9
30 Jun – 3 Jul 2021	Rating	2,500	24.9	12.8	12.3	13.5	2.0	4.7	4.8		4.3	4.5	3.7	2.6			2.6	1.8		4.1					1.3	11.4
25–30 Jun 2021	SOCIS	2,000	24.8	13.3	10.8	18.1	2.9	2.0	**8.3**	1.5	2.1	4.9	2.9	3.6				1.6	0.7						2.6	6.7
22–29 Jun 2021	KIIS	2,031	20.6	16.9	14.7	15.0	1.9	**5.7**	**7.0**		1.7	**5.1**	3.7	2.2				1.5	0.6	1.6			1.6		0.2	3.7
18–28 Jun 2021	UIF	2,400	23	18	14	14	2	3	**6**			4	3	3		2		2	0.5	2					3.8 (Note: Triumph of Palchevskyy – 0.8)	5
11–16 Jun 2021	Razumkov Centre	2,018	28.1	15.0	10.5	19.1	1.1	2.5	**6.0**	1.2		3.7	0.8	2.7		3.0		0.4	0.1	1.8	0.2				3.8	9.0
26 May – 8 Jun 2021	SMC	3,004	23.3	15.9	11.1	15.3	1.8	4.2	4.9	1.0		4.5	2.8	1.8	0.9	2.3	0.4	0.9				0.7			5.1	7.4
1–7 Jun 2021	KIIS	2,003	20.3	11.9	12.0	18.5	2.1	4.2	**7.2**	4.2		4.2	3.4	1.8	0.9	3.5	1.5	0.8	1.1	2.1					0.5	1.8
28 May – 3 Jun 2021	SOCIS	2,000	21.0	13.5	12.9	18.2	3.2	2.8	**7.0**	0.7	2.2	3.5	3.4	3.5				2.2	1.1						4.7	2.8
27 May – 1 Jun 2021	KIIS	2,000	17.7	14.7	13.9	15.4	2.9	**5.0**	**8.0**	0.5	4.6	**5.8**	4.5	3.4				1.4	0.9						1.2	2.3

=== November 2020 – May 2021 ===
Dates conducted	Polling firm	Sample size	Servant of the People (political party)	Opposition Platform — For Life	Batkivshchyna	European Solidarity	Holos (political party)	Radical Party of Oleh Liashko	Strength and Honor (political party)	Opposition Bloc (2019)	Nashi (political party)	Ukrainian Strategy of Groysman	Party of Shariy	Svoboda (political party)	National Corps	Civil Position	Self Reliance (political party)	For the Future (political party)	Proposition (political party)	Ukrainian Democratic Alliance for Reform	Our Land (Ukraine)	People's Front (Ukraine)	Others	Lead
15–24 May 2021	UIF	2,400	22	17	15	14	2	3	**6**			4	4	3		2		2	0.5	3			4 (Note: Triumph of Palchevskyy – 1)	5
14–19 May 2021	DIF & Razumkov Centre	2,020	28.2	14.1	12.6	18.8	1.7	2.4	**6.2**	1.2		2.7	0.9	3.5		2.8		0.8	0.1	1.0	0.2		2.8	9.4
16–18 May 2021	Rating	2,500	24.8	13.2	11.8	13.5	3.3	4.1	**5.0**		4.0	3.8	3.1	3.7			1.8	1.9		4.0			1.9	11.3
28 Apr – 6 May 2021	SMC	3,017	23.5	20.1	11.8	17.9	1.6	3.3	4.9	0.4		4.2	2.9	1.1	0.3	2.8	0.7	0.9				0.4	1.1	3.4
22–29 Apr 2021	Razumkov Centre	2,021	28.2	15.0	10.8	18.3	2.7	2.5	**6.4**	0.9		3.0	1.9	2.3		1.8				0.9			5.4	9.9
23–27 Apr 2021	Rating	2,000	22.8	13.7	12.2	14.4	2.8	3.7	3.2		2.5	3.5	3.6	3.4			2.2	3.0		2.5		1.5	4.9	8.4
16–22 Apr 2021	KIIS	2,003	21.3	12.2	10.2	17.7	1.6	4.1	**7.6**	3.3		3.9	3.4	1.8	1.1	3.7	2.0	1.4	0.7	2.8			1.3	3.6
8–12 Apr 2021	SOCIS	2,000	22.7	12.0	10.8	20.4	3.3	3.1	**6.4**	0.9	1.9	4.8	1.5	3.8				1.1	0.7				6.6	2.3
6–7 Apr 2021	Rating	2,500	22.9	14.2	12.9	14.6	2.6	4.4	4.7		3.5	4.3	3.4	3.4			2.4	1.7		3.4			1.5	8.3
24–30 Mar 2021	SMC	3,000	23.9	20.5	11.5	16.1	1.7	3.1	4.9	0.4		4.0	3.2	2.0	0.3	2.8	0.7	0.9				0.4	1.1	3.4
23–24 Mar 2021	Rating	2,500	20.8	14.8	12.4	15.0	3.5	4.6	**5.0**		3.1	**5.0**	2.9	2.9				2.4		3.2		2.0	2.5	5.8
13–21 Mar 2021	Rating & IRI	2,400	22	17	12	17	2	4	4	1	1	4	3	3	1	1	1	2	1	1			4	5
3–13 Mar 2021	UIF	2,400	22	18	13	15	2	3	**5**			4	3	3		1		2	0.5	2			2.3 (Note: Triumph of Palchevskyy – 0.3)	4
5–9 Mar 2021	Razumkov Centre	2,018	26.5	17.9	9.4	20.1	3.4	2.0	**5.2**	1.2		3.0	1.6	3.4		1.3				1.1			3.8	6.4
2–3 Mar 2021	Rating	2,500	19.5	14.3	12.3	14.7	3.1	**5.0**	**5.3**		4.0	**5.3**	3.1	2.8				3.0		2.7		1.9	2.9	4.8
23 Feb – 1 Mar 2021	KIIS	1,207	21.3	18.1	14.4	15.0	3.6	4.4	**5.0**			3.7	2.6	4.4			1.2	2.4	0.0	2.6	0.4		0.9	3.2
19–28 Feb 2021	SMC	3,017	21.9	21.3	11.3	15	1.7	3.5	4.9	0.8		4.1	3.2	2.2	0.6	2.8	0.4	1.1				0.8	1.0	0.6
22–23 Feb 2021	Rating	2,500	19.7	14.2	12.0	16.2	3.3	4.9	4.4		3.5	**5.1**	3.2	3.8				2.8		3.2		1.9	2.0	3.5
19 Feb 2021	NSDC deploys sanctions against opposition MP Viktor Medvedchuk																							
11–16 Feb 2021	KIIS & SOCIS	3,000	17.6	17.8	11.4	19.2	2.8	4.8	**8.5**	0.9		**5.3**	2.9	3.4				2.7	0.7				1.9	1.4
5–7 Feb 2021	KIIS	2,005	15.5	16.8	13.2	18.1	3.7	**5.2**	**6.3**	2.3		3.2	3.9	2.7	0.4	1.8	1.2	1.6	1.2	2.1			1.0	1.3
21 Jan – 5 Feb 2021	Info Sapiens	1,003	23.0	21.8	13.7	23.0	0.9	4.7	4.6			2.3	1.6	0.7				0.5		1.4	0.2		1.4	Tie
2–3 Feb 2021	Rating	2,000	18.6	18.9	12.2	15.2	3.5	4.7	4.5			4.8	3.4	3.1				4.4	0.4	2.4	1.4		2.6	0.3
1–3 Feb 2021	Info Sapiens	2,012	13.5	19.8	14.7	17.0	2.6	**6.1**	**7.4**			4.3	3.1	3.3						3.2			4.9	2.8
29 Jan – 3 Feb 2021	Razumkov Centre	2,019	22.2	21.9	10.3	18.1	2.7	2.5	4.7	1.1		2.3	2.1	2.5		2.4				1.2			5.8	0.3
27 Jan – 1 Feb 2021	KIIS	1,205	18.2	24.1	10.3	15.6	2.4	4.6	**6.4**			3.4	3.2	3.6			1.9	2.7	0.1	1.7	1.0		0.8	5.9
15–25 Jan 2021	SMC	3,014	20.7	22.6	11.3	15.6	1.2	3.8	4.9	0.9		3.3	2.2	3.3	1.1	2.5		1.1	0.5			0.7	3.3	1.9
22 Jan 2021	KIIS	1,005	11.2	20.7	12.6	15.3	**5.6**		**8.3**	3.1		**5.3**	4.6	3.8				2.4	1.0	4.4			1.7	5.4
2–4 Jan 2021	Rating	2,500	21.6	17.4	10.9	14.5	2.8	**5.6**	2.8			**5.7**	2.9	3.2				3.7	0.3	3.1	2.2		3.5	4.2
17–23 Dec 2020	KIIS	1,200	20.9	23.1	9.8	14.1	3.1	**6.1**	4.4	1.8		**5.2**	2.3	2.8			0.4	2.3	0.4	2.2	0.8		0.4	2.2
16–20 Dec 2020	Rating	2,000	21.1	17.3	10.9	15.2	3.5	4.8	3.8			4.8	3.4	3.4				4.3	0.6	3.3	1.6		2.1	3.8
5–13 Dec 2020	DIF	2,000	17.3	22.5	13.1	16.1	2.5	2.5	4.0	0.8		3.0	3.1	2.4	0.3	2.0	3.5	4.1	0.5	1.4			0.8	5.2
4–9 Dec 2020	Razumkov Centre	2,018	26.5	17.7	8.8	19.5	2.3	1.9	4.8	1.0		3.8	2.5	2.9		1.6		1.6	0.2	1.3	0.6		1.5 (Note: Triumph of Palchevskyy – 0.9)	7.0
4–8 Dec 2020	KIIS	2,000	19.0	17.4	10.1	16.9	3.5	3.2	**5.6**	1.7		3.8	3.3	2.9	0.4	3.2	1.9	3.2	1.0	1.8			1.2	1.6
18–26 Nov 2020	SMC	3,020	25.9	22.1	9.1	15.9	1.0	4.2	4.9	0.4		1.3	3.2	3.1	1.3	2.9	0.6	1.3					0.7	3.8
5–8 Nov 2020	KIIS	1,083	18.7	22.1	9.3	19.3	4.7	**5.4**	**6.6**			3.7	2.9	3.3				1.6	1.3				1.2	2.8
30 Oct – 5 Nov 2020	Razumkov Centre	2,020	27.9	16.5	8.2	21.2	2.6	1.8	4.8	0.6		1.7	2.2	3.9		2.1		1.8	0.7		1.4		2.7 (Note: Triumph of Palchevskyy – 0.5)	6.7
2–3 Nov 2020	Rating	2,000	22.7	17.1	8.0	15.4	3.6	4.3	4.3			3.1	3.4	3.5				4.5	0.9	3.7	2.4		3.3 (Note: Triumph of Palchevskyy – 1.6)	5.6
28 Oct – 2 Nov 2020	SOCIS	2,000	25.0	15.6	9.3	17.9	3.3	3.0	4.1	0.7		1.4	2.7	3.1		2.7		3.7	1.2				5.7	7.1

=== June 2020 – October 2020 ===
Dates conducted	Polling firm	Sample size	Servant of the People (political party)	Opposition Platform — For Life	Batkivshchyna	European Solidarity	Holos (political party)	Radical Party of Oleh Liashko	Strength and Honor (political party)	Opposition Bloc (2019)	Ukrainian Strategy of Groysman	Party of Shariy	Svoboda (political party)	National Corps	Civil Position	Self Reliance (political party)	For the Future (political party)	Proposition (political party)	Ukrainian Democratic Alliance for Reform	Others	Lead
25 Oct 2020	2020 local election																				
17–24 Oct 2020	KIIS	1,502	20.6	22.1	9.2	16.0	4.2	**5.0**	**5.4**		2.9	2.8	4.0				3.9	0.5		3.3	1.5
20–29 Sep 2020	SMC	3,014	25.9	22.0	9.5	14.2	1.6	4.1	4.3	0.8	1.5	3.7	2.9	1.1	3.6	0.5	0.9			1.4	3.9
18–28 Sep 2020	SOCIS	2,000	23.3	14.3	8.3	18.4	3.3	2.6	4.5	0.9	1.8	3.3	3.6		1.7		3.5	0.9		9.6 (Note: Party of Greens – 2.0)	4.9
12–16 Sep 2020	KIIS	2,000	21.5	16.3	8.7	17.8	1.3	**6.3**	4.0	1.8	2.8	4.1	3.3	0.8	3.1	1.8	1.9	1.0	2.6	0.9	3.7
29 Aug – 3 Sep 2020	Rating	10,000	25.7	16.7	9.4	15.6	4.3	**6.0**	4.0	0.5	2.5	3.5	2.5		0.7		1.4		1.7	5.4 (Note: Triumph of Palchevskyy – 2.1)	9.0
14–19 Aug 2020	DIF & Razumkov Centre	2,018	29.5	21.7	11.5	15.5	1.8	2.7	4.6	1.5	1.3	2.2	2.4		0.8					4.5 (Note: Democratic Axe – 0.4)	7.8
8–15 Aug 2020	SMC	3,012	26.7	21.3	9.8	12.5	1.8	3.3	4.9	0.9	1.4	3.6	2.3	1.1	3.8	0.9	0.8			2.4	5.4
5 Aug 2020	Rating	2,000	25.9	17.6	10.4	15.7	2.6	4.8	4.6	2.0	3.2	3.0	3.0		1.2				1.9	4.1	8.3
30–31 Jul 2020	Rating & IRI	2,472	30	17	8	16	2	2	2	2	2	2	2		4					9 (Note: Bloc of Hennadiy Kernes – 1)	13
21–28 Jul 2020	SOCIS & Razumkov Centre	4,000	25.5	18.3	10.4	18.1	2.2	2.8	**6.5**	1.3	1.9	2.5	2.0		1.6		0.6	0.4		5.9 (Note: Party of Greens – 1.2)	7.2
15–20 Jul 2020	Rating	2,000	27.8	15.5	10.0	14.3	2.4	4.0	3.5		2.8	3.4	3.3		1.3	1.0			1.5	7.9	12.3
16–17 Jul 2020	Rating	2,000	27.9	18.0	11.4	14.7	3.1	**5.2**	4.3	1.0	3.3	3.4	3.2		0.7	0.8				3.0	9.9
8–15 Jul 2020	SMC	3,035	29.8	20.1	9.6	15.7	2.1	2.8	4.9	0.9	0.5	2.6	2.5	0.9	3.0	0.5	0.7			1.0	9.7
3–9 Jul 2020	Razumkov Centre	2,022	34.1	19.1	8.4	15.1	3.3	2.2	3.7	1.5	1.6	2.4	2.2		2.8					4.9 (Note: Democratic Axe – 0.1)	15.0
24–30 Jun 2020	SOCIS	2,000	26.6	18.6	7.3	21.3	3.3	3.3	**5.0**	1.1	1.5	3.9	1.7		1.6		0.6	0.7		3.5 (Note: Party of Greens – 2.1)	5.3
24–28 Jun 2020	Rating	2,000	29.3	15.3	10.7	13.6	3.0	3.5	3.7	1.1	2.2	3.7	2.5		1.1	1.2	1.7			5.7	14.0
10–26 Jun 2020	Info Sapiens	1,000	34.3	14.1	10.8	14.5	1.5	2.6	4.3	3.0	3.1	2.8	2.2		2.7	0.9				1.9 (Note: Movement of New Forces – 1.0, Agrarian Party of Ukraine – 0.5, Power of the People - 0.2)	24.2
17–24 Jun 2020	Razumkov Centre	2,017	30.3	21.8	8.5	15.7	2.3	0.9	3.2	2.3	1.7	1.8	1.8	0.5	3.4	1.9				3.9 (Note: People's Front – 0.2)	8.5
10–19 Jun 2020	SMC	3,037	30.5	18.6	9.7	12.0	2.1	3.2	4.3	1.6	1.4	2.1	3.2	0.8	4.2	0.8				1.4	11.9
24 May – 4 Jun 2020	KIIS	4,000	28.0	17.7	8.0	16.2	3.8	4.5	4.7	1.6	2.6	4.7	2.3	0.7	2.9	1.4				4.6	10.3

=== July 2019 – May 2020 ===
Dates conducted	Polling firm	Sample size	Servant of the People (political party)	Opposition Platform — For Life	Batkivshchyna	European Solidarity	Holos (political party)	Radical Party of Oleh Liashko	Strength and Honor (political party)	Opposition Bloc (2019)	Nashi (political party)	Ukrainian Strategy of Groysman	Party of Shariy	Svoboda (political party)	National Corps	Civil Position	Self Reliance (political party)	Others	Lead
24–29 May 2020	SOCIS	2,000	33.9	16.3	8.3	15.4	3.9	3.4	3.6	2.0		2.4	3.5	2.3		1.7		3.1	17.6
14–17 May 2020	KIIS	2,000	31.2	17.4	8.9	14.8	3.6	3.1	3.5	2.7		2.6	3.9	2.0	0.2	2.8	0.7	1.5	13.8
12–13 May 2020	Rating	3,000	34.0	15.1	9.2	14.0	2.5	4.0	4.7	2.0		3.1	3.4	2.6		0.9	1.4	3.2	18.9
26–30 Apr 2020	KIIS	1,507	29.9	15.8	11.6	13.5	2.8	4.9	**6.9**	2.2		2.7	3.6	4.7				1.5	14.1
24–29 Apr 2020	Razumkov Centre	2,056	41.5	14.2	7.0	13.9	3.1		4.5									15.8	27.3
17–25 Apr 2020	KIIS	4,024	32.6	15.8	12.0	15.2	2.7	3.6	3.4	1.7		1.7	3.5	2.0	0.8	2.5	1.3	1.2	16.8
10–12 Apr 2020	Rating	2,000	38.1	14.1	9.1	15.4	3.0	2.8	1.7	1.8		1.7	2.9	1.9		0.9	0.9	5.5	22.7
13–23 Mar 2020	SOCIS	2,000	39.8	12.4	7.4	15.2	2.4	2.8	3.7	1.3		1.6	1.1	2.5		2.0		1.0	22.6
4–19 Mar 2020	Info Sapiens	1,000	38.7	13.0	8.5	14.5	1.8	1.9	**5.1**	3.0		4.7	2.2	1.9		2.0	0.8	1.7 (Note: Movement of New Forces – 0.2, Agrarian Party of Ukraine – 0.1, Power of the People - 0.2)	24.2
4 Mar 2020	Denys Shmyhal becomes the new Prime Minister																		
4 Mar 2020	Verkhovna Rada dismisses Prime Minister Oleksiy Honcharuk and his government																		
8–18 Feb 2020	KIIS	2,038	39.1	15.6	9.0	10.8	0.9	4.2	4.6	3.4		1.0	1.8	2.7		2.5	1.5	2.3 (Note: Party of Greens – 0.9)	23.5
13–17 Feb 2020	Razumkov Centre	2,018	36.4	15.3	10.3	12.6	3.2	3.5	4.7	2.0		1.5		2.7		2.7		5.1	21.1
1–10 Feb 2020	SOCIS	2,000	40.6	13.5	10.9	13.6	3.4	3.4	3.9	2.0		1.9	1.5	1.2		2.2		1.6	27.0
24–28 Jan 2020	SMC	2,003	38.9	14.8	10.8	10.6	4.4	2.1	3.9	2.5			2.5	4.6			1.8	3.1 (Note: Agrarian Party – 0.8, Movement of New Forces – 0.7)	24.1
20–27 Jan 2020	SOCIS	2,000	47.9	14.4	8.0	12.0	2.2	2.7	4.8	1.0		1.5	1.5	1.5	0.3	1.9		0.4	33.5
22–26 Jan 2020	Rating	2,500	42.2	13.5	8.1	9.5	3.4	2.4	3.6	1.4	1.0	1.3	2.0	2.5		2.3	0.5	5.4	28.7
17–21 Jan 2020	Razumkov Centre	2,000	45.4	13.8	8.0	12.3	2.5	2.9	**5.2**	0.9		2.2	0.5	1.6	0.6	2.9		1.1	31.6
13–17 Dec 2019	Rating	2,500	47.8	11.4	7.8	9.0	4.4	2.2	1.9	1.5	0.6	1.0	1.6	2.4		1.9	0.9	6.5	36.4
20–30 Nov 2019	SOCIS	2,000	46.6	13.1	7.4	14.4	4.5	2.3	3.5	1.3		1.3	1.8	1.8		1.2		0.9	32.2
20–24 Nov 2019	Rating	2,500	44.8	12.7	8.5	9.6	4.4	2.2	2.6	1.2		1.6	1.7	1.6		2.2		5.8	32.1
16–23 Oct 2019	SOCIS	2,000	54.1	10.3	6.3	10.7	**5.3**	1.5	3.7	1.5		1.4	1.6	1.1		1.7		0.9	43.4
21 Jul 2019	2019 election		43.16	13.05	8.18	8.10	**5.82**	4.01	3.82	3.03		2.41	2.23	2.15		1.04	0.62	2.38	30.11

== Monthly averages ==
Date	Servant of the People (political party)	Opposition Platform — For Life	Batkivshchyna	European Solidarity	Holos (political party)	Radical Party of Oleh Liashko	Strength and Honor	Opposition Bloc (2019)	Nashi (political party)	Ukrainian Strategy of Groysman	Party of Shariy	Svoboda (political party)	National Corps	Civil Position	Self Reliance (political party)	For the Future (political party)	Proposition (political party)	Ukrainian Democratic Alliance for Reform	Our Land (Ukraine)	People's Front (Ukraine)	Ukraine is Our Home	24 August	Smart Politics (Ukraine)	Others	Lead
March 2022 (1)	52.00	~~1.30~~	5.20	12.60	0.60	0.60	5.20	~~0.50~~	~~0.90~~	1.20	~~0.80~~	0.70		0.20		0.50	0.40	3.10				9.50	3.90	0.80	39.40
February 2022 (6)	18.28	10.43	11.05	19.17	1.36	3.70	6.22		5.37	4.77	2.50	2.87	0.90		1.25	1.17	0.60	2.13		3.20	0.10	5.73	6.70	1.53	0.89
January 2022 (2)	16.05	10.30	12.95	22.05	1.95	3.20	6.10		5.40	3.95	2.25	2.65						3.35					8.15	1.85	6.00
December 2021 (10)	18.62	11.47	11.51	15.97	1.57	3.43	6.27	0.40	5.25	5.18	2.41	3.28	0.90	0.60	1.73	1.18	0.30	2.77	0.40	1.30	0.10	3.25	7.39	1.62	2.65
November 2021 (8)	19.13	12.21	11.95	16.08	1.30	3.26	6.16	0.20	5.39	4.59	2.38	2.84		1.50	1.65	1.42	0.30	2.38	0.83	1.25	0.10	2.80	7.71	1.49	3.05
October 2021 (7)	20.01	13.50	12.67	16.36	1.53	3.51	6.51	0.40	5.24	4.86	2.71	2.97		2.90	1.90	1.35	0.50	2.27	0.70		0.60	2.60	6.13	2.87	3.65
September 2021 (5)	23.98	13.96	11.38	16.30	1.66	3.32	6.64	2.37	4.50	4.52	2.66	2.36	0.80	2.45	1.35	1.40	0.47	2.50		0.70	0.60	3.10		2.28	7.68
August 2021 (4)	24.00	16.43	12.48	16.08	1.55	3.20	6.38	0.83	2.80	4.50	2.05	3.23	0.80	1.95	0.60	1.08	0.63	2.00	0.50	1.10	0.30			2.68	7.57
July 2021 (6)	24.32	15.10	12.38	15.40	1.75	3.80	5.72	0.80	3.68	4.37	2.53	3.05	1.00	2.05	1.53	1.18	0.63	3.10	0.50	0.90	0.30			2.53	8.92
June 2021 (10)	22.95	14.79	12.41	16.26	2.11	3.74	6.50	1.41	2.98	4.36	3.02	2.68	0.93	2.68	1.20	1.35	0.71	2.32	0.20	0.80	1.60			2.54	6.69
May 2021 (7)	22.93	15.50	12.73	16.16	2.36	3.54	6.00	0.76	3.60	4.07	3.09	2.86	0.60	2.48	0.97	1.44	0.65	2.67	0.20	0.55				2.97	6.77
April 2021 (6)	23.57	14.53	11.45	17.22	2.43	3.52	5.53	1.38	2.63	3.95	2.78	2.63	0.70	2.77	1.83	1.62	0.70	2.40		0.95				3.47	6.35
March 2021 (7)	22.29	17.23	12.14	16.13	2.76	3.73	4.91	0.87	2.70	4.14	2.77	3.07	0.65	1.53	0.97	2.12	0.50	2.10	0.40	1.43				2.50	5.06
February 2021 (10)	19.15	19.47	12.35	17.24	2.72	4.54	5.67	1.28	3.50	3.85	2.92	2.97	0.50	2.33	1.18	2.28	0.48	2.23	0.75	1.35				2.23	0.32
January 2021 (6)	19.48	21.42	11.52	17.02	2.60	4.24	5.28	1.70		3.72	2.77	2.85	1.10	2.45	1.90	2.08	0.48	2.36	1.13	0.70				2.75	1.94
December 2020 (5)	20.96	19.60	10.54	16.36	2.98	3.70	4.52	1.33		4.12	2.92	2.88	0.35	2.27	1.93	3.10	0.54	2.00	1.00					1.20	1.36
November 2020 (5)	24.04	18.68	8.78	17.94	3.04	3.74	4.94	0.57		2.24	2.88	3.38	1.30	2.57	0.60	2.58	1.03	3.70	1.90					2.72	5.36
October 2020 (3)	24.50	18.07	8.90	18.37	3.37	3.27	4.77	0.65		2.00	2.57	3.67		2.40		3.13	0.80		1.40					3.90	6.13
September 2020 (4)	24.10	17.33	8.98	16.50	2.63	4.75	4.20	1.00		2.15	3.65	3.08	0.95	2.28	1.15	1.93	0.95	2.15						4.33	6.77
August 2020 (4)	26.95	19.33	10.28	14.83	2.63	4.20	4.53	1.23		2.10	3.08	2.55	1.10	1.63	0.90	1.10		1.80						4.10	7.62
July 2020 (6)	29.18	18.00	9.63	15.65	2.52	3.17	4.15	1.34		2.02	2.72	2.53	0.90	2.23	0.77	0.65	0.40	1.50						5.28	11.18
June 2020 (6)	29.83	17.68	9.17	15.55	2.67	3.00	4.20	1.78		2.08	3.17	2.28	0.67	2.65	1.24	1.15	0.70			0.20				3.47	12.15
May 2020 (4)	31.78	16.63	8.60	15.10	3.45	3.75	4.13	2.08		2.68	3.88	2.30	0.45	2.08										3.10	15.15
April 2020 (4)	35.53	14.98	9.93	14.50	2.90	3.77	4.13	1.90		2.03	3.33	2.87	0.80	1.70	1.10									6.00	20.55
March 2020 (2)	39.25	12.70	7.95	14.85	2.10	2.35	4.40	2.15		3.15	1.65	2.20		2.00	0.80									1.35	24.40
February 2020 (3)	38.70	14.80	10.07	12.33	2.50	3.70	4.40	2.47		1.47	1.65	2.20		2.47	1.50									3.00	23.90
January 2020 (4)	43.60	14.13	8.73	11.10	3.13	2.53	4.38	1.45	1.00	1.67	1.63	2.55	0.45	2.37	1.15									2.50	29.47
December 2019 (1)	47.80	11.40	7.80	9.00	4.40	2.20	1.90	1.50	0.60	1.00	1.60	2.40		1.90	0.90									6.50	36.40
November 2019 (2)	45.70	12.90	7.95	12.00	4.45	2.25	3.05	1.25		1.45	1.75	1.70		1.70										3.35	32.80
October 2019 (1)	54.10	10.30	6.30	10.70	5.30	1.50	3.70	1.50		1.40	1.60	1.10		1.70										0.90	43.40
2019 election	43.16	13.05	8.18	8.10	5.82	4.01	3.82	3.03		2.41	2.23	2.15		1.04	0.62									2.38	30.11

== See also ==
- Opinion polling for the next Ukrainian presidential election
- Opinion polling for the 2019 Ukrainian parliamentary election
