= Next Ukrainian presidential election =

- TBA; Not before 29 January 2027
- Opinion polls
Incumbent President
Volodymyr Zelenskyy
Servant of the People

Presidential elections were scheduled to be held in Ukraine in March or April 2024. However, as martial law has been in effect since 24 February 2022 in response to the full-scale Russian invasion of Ukraine, no elections were held because Ukrainian law does not allow presidential elections to be held when martial law is in effect. Martial law has been extended in 90-day intervals since the full-scale invasion with parliament's approval, and has most recently (as of October 2026) been extended for the 21st time until 29 January 2027.

On 25 September 2025, Zelenskyy stated in an interview with Axios that he was "ready" to not run again after the war's conclusion. On 15 December 2025, Zelenskyy said in an interview with ZDF that he would run if the next election was held during the war, but was unsure if he would run in peacetime.

== Background ==
=== Postponement ===
Article 19 of Ukraine's "On the Legal Regime of Martial Law" bans presidential, parliamentary, and local elections under martial law, while Article 10 states that the powers of the president, parliament, and Cabinet of Ministers of Ukraine cannot be terminated under martial law. Article 108 of the Constitution of Ukraine stipulates that "The President of Ukraine exercises his or her powers until the assumption of office by the newly-elected President of Ukraine", allowing incumbent President Volodymyr Zelenskyy to legitimately remain president until the next president is sworn in, even after the expiration of the five-year term to which he was elected in 2019.

Apart from the legal prohibition, both government and opposition politicians in Ukraine questioned the feasibility of a 2024 election, citing concerns over security and displaced voters as the Russian invasion continued. Russia controls 18% of Ukraine's territory as of October 2024, and nearly 14 million Ukrainians have either fled abroad or been displaced internally. Other challenges identified include danger to voters and likely disruption of the voting process due to Russian bombardment; the inability of citizens in Russian-occupied areas of Ukraine to vote; the inability of soldiers to vote or run as candidates; damaged polling infrastructure; an outdated voter registry that has not been updated to reflect millions of displaced voters; expanded state powers and restricted rights under martial law that would limit campaigning and prevent fair competition for opposition candidates; and the lack of funds.

A poll released by KIIS in October 2023 reported that 81% of Ukrainians did not want elections until the war was over, and more than 200 civil society institutions, NGOs, and human rights groups have formally opposed wartime elections. In November 2023, Zelenskyy said "now is not the right time for elections", in response to a claim by European Solidarity MP Oleksiy Goncharenko that Zelenskyy had decided to hold elections on 31 March 2024. Later in November, all political parties represented in the Verkhovna Rada (Ukraine's national parliament) signed a document in which they agreed to postpone holding any national election until after the end of martial law and agreed to work on a special law that would regulate the first post-war election, which would take place no earlier than six months after the cancellation of martial law.

The postponement of the election was criticised by representatives of the Russian government. Dmitry Peskov, spokesman for Russian president Vladimir Putin, contended that the move deprived Zelenskyy of formal legitimacy; Russia held its own presidential election in 2024, which was criticised by international observers as having unprecedented levels of fraud and irregularity.

On 26 February 2025, after a previous failed vote on a similar resolution, the Verkhovna Rada passed a resolution reaffirming that elections should not be held during martial law, and also pledged to hold a presidential election upon the conclusion of the Russo-Ukrainian War. On 6 March 2025 opposition politicians Petro Poroshenko and Yulia Tymoshenko, after having confirmed that they had held discussions with United States representatives, confirmed that they still opposed elections held during wartime.

On 9 December 2025, after pressure from US President Donald Trump to hold elections, Zelenskyy said he was ready to hold elections in 60 to 90 days if the US and Ukraine's European allies ensured the necessary security. In the 19 December 2025 Direct Line with Vladimir Putin press conference president Putin stated that he was ready to "consider ensuring security" inside Ukraine on a Ukrainian election day. He claimed this would be "At the very least, to stop, to refrain from strikes deep into the territory on the voting day." Putin then demanded that the, according to him "about 5 to 10 million", Ukrainian citizens "currently residing in Russia be given the right to vote on the territory of the Russian Federation." The Verkhovna Rada formed a special working group for preparing a bill on holding a presidential election under martial law that had its first session on 26 December 2025. A poll released by KIIS on 5 January 2026 reported that 10% of Ukrainians believed elections should be held before the war was over. 23% believed elections should take place after a truce had begun and security guarantees were obtained. 59% were convinced that elections were only possible after the war ends.

== Electoral system ==
The president of Ukraine is elected for a five-year term using the two-round system; if no candidate receives an absolute majority in the first round, a second round is expected to take place three weeks after the first. According to Article 103 of the constitution, in the event of pre-term termination of presidential authority, the election of a new president must take place within 90 days of the previous president's departure from office.

The constitution allows presidents to serve a maximum of two terms in office, though only Leonid Kuchma has served a second term.

== Candidates ==
=== Declared ===
Name	Born	Affiliation	Experience	Key dates
Valerii Zaluzhnyi	8 July 1973 (53); Novohrad-Volynskyi, Zhytomyr Oblast	Independent	Ambassador to the United Kingdom (2024–present); Commander-in-Chief of the Armed Forces of Ukraine (2021–2024)	Announced intention: 1 July 2026 (privately according to Ukrainska Pravda sources)
Petro Poroshenko	26 September 1965 (61); Bolhrad, Odesa Oblast	European Solidarity	People's Deputy (1998–2007, 2012–14, 2019–present); President of Ukraine (2014–2019); Minister of Trade and Economic Development (2012); Minister of Foreign Affairs (2009–10)	Announced intention: 2 April 2024
Oleksii Arestovych	3 August 1975 (51); Dedoplistsqaro, Georgian SSR, Soviet Union	Independent	Adviser to the Office of the President of Ukraine (2020–2023); Speaker of the Trilateral Contact Group on Ukraine (2020–2022)	Announced intention: 1 November 2023

=== Potential ===
Name	Born	Affiliation	Experience	Comment
Volodymyr Zelenskyy	25 January 1978 (48); Kryvyi Rih, Dnipropetrovsk Oblast	Servant of the People	President of Ukraine (2019–present)	Indicated he is "ready" to not run again after the war’s conclusion. Later said he would run if the next election is during the war, and is not sure if he will run if the election is in peacetime
Mykhailo Fedorov	21 January 1991 (35); Vasylivka, Zaporizhzhia Oblast	Independent	Minister of Defense (2026); First Deputy Prime Minister of Ukraine (2025–2026); Minister of Digital Transformation (2019–2026)	Publicly called for wartime elections on August 18, 2026 after his dismissal. Did not explicitly state whether he would run. Polls indicated he may defeat Zelenskyy in second round.
Kyrylo Budanov	4 January 1986 (40); Kyiv	Independent	Head of the Office of the President of Ukraine (2026–present); Chief of the Main Directorate of Intelligence (2020-2026)	Has not publicly expressed any intention to run but declined to commit to not running. Polls indicated he may defeat Zelenskyy in second round.
Ihor Terekhov	14 January 1967 (59); Kharkiv, Kharkiv Oblast	Kernes Bloc — Successful Kharkiv	Mayor of Kharkiv (2021-present); Kharkiv City Council deputy (2015-2021); Deputy Mayor of Kharkiv (2010-2015); Deputy Head of Governor of Kharkiv Oblast (2007-2010)	Has increasingly been featured in polling as a viable dark-horse contender for the next presidential election. Scored among the highest levels of trust and lowest distrust for politicians. Was one of the four shortlisted candidates for prime minister during the July 2026 government reshuffle. Speculated to be forming a potential political team with Vitalii Kim. Stated that he will be "in Kharkiv until the end of the war" and opposed wartime voting.
Andriy Biletsky	5 August 1979 (47); Kharkiv, Kharkiv Oblast	National Corps	Commander of the 3rd Army Corps (2025-present); Commander of the 3rd Assault Brigade (2023-2025); People's Deputy (2014-2019); Commander of the Azov Brigade (2014)	Leader of the far-right National Corps party. Currently a Brigadier General in the Ukrainian Armed Forces and commander of the 3rd Army Corps. He has stated that he is currently focused solely on military missions and will decide on post-war political plans only "after the war ends."
Dmytro Razumkov	8 October 1983 (43); Berdychiv, Zhytomyr Oblast	Smart Politics	People's Deputy (2019-present); Chairman of the Verkhovna Rada (2019-2021)	Former Chairman of Parliament and former leader of the Servant of the People party. Broke with President Zelenskyy in 2021, subsequently impeached and left the party. He later founded the cross-factional caucus Smart Politics. He had previously questioned the legitimacy of President Zelenskyy's wartime power and initiated a petition in parliament demanding the cabinet's resignation. Has been included in some polls as a potential candidate. Stated that presidential elections should be held only after the end of the war and martial law.
Yulia Tymoshenko	27 November 1960 (65); Dnipropetrovsk, Dnipropetrovsk Oblast	Batkivshchyna	People's Deputy (1997-2000, 2002-2005, 2006-2007, 2007, 2014-present); Prime Minister of Ukraine (2005, 2007-2010); First Deputy Prime Minister of Ukraine (1999-2001)	Served twice as Prime Minister of Ukraine and ran for president three times. Has recently been embroiled in corruption allegations, and her public support has shrunk to single digits. Stated that elections should not be held during wartime.
Serhiy Prytula	22 June 1981 (45); Zbarazh, Ternopil Oblast	24 August	TV personality, comedian, fundraiser	TV personality and prominent fundraiser who raises significant funds for the Ukrainian Ground Forces. Previously affiliated with the Holos party before leaving amid internal conflict, later attempting to form a new party called 24 August. Been floated as a potential election contender by polls and media. Has publicly stated that "The first step is victory" before "everything else".

== See also ==
- Next Ukrainian parliamentary election
- Next Ukrainian local elections
- Next Ukrainian census
