= Ukrainian presidential elections =

Presidential elections in Ukraine

Ukrainian presidential elections determine who will serve as the President of Ukraine for the next five years.

Since the establishment of the position of the President of Ukraine in 1991, presidential elections have taken place seven times: in 1991, 1994, 1999, 2004, 2010, 2014 and 2019. The next election would have been scheduled for 2024; however, it was not held because of the full-scale Russian invasion of Ukraine ongoing since 24 February 2022 and the resulting imposition of martial law in Ukraine, under which elections legally cannot be held.

== Procedure ==
The presidential election rules are defined by the Constitution of Ukraine and the Electoral Code of Ukraine.

=== Eligibility requirements ===
A candidate for the President's office must:

- be a citizen of Ukraine;
- be at least 35 years of age on the election day;
- have the right to vote;
- speak the official language (Ukrainian);
- have lived in Ukraine for the last ten years prior to election day.

The same person cannot be elected President more than twice in a row.

=== Nomination process ===
A candidate can be nominated by a political party or be self-nominated.

=== Campaigning ===
A presidential candidate may start his or her election campaign the next day after he or she is registered by the Central Election Commission.

The presidential election campaign ends at 24:00 of the last Friday before the election day.

=== Popular vote ===
Regular presidential elections are held on the last Sunday of March (formerly in October) of the fifth and last year of the incumbent President's term of office. If a president's term in office ends prematurely, the election of a new president must take place within ninety days of the president's office falling vacant.

The president is elected by direct popular vote in a two-round majoritarian contest. If no candidate receives a simple majority (over 50%) of votes in the first round, the two candidates with the most votes advance to a run-off, which is called for the third Sunday after the first round; the candidate who receives more votes in the run-off is then elected president.

If one of the two remaining candidates drops out at least 12 days before the run-off, the next-best candidate from the first round will advance into the second round instead. If there is only one candidate left in the second round (e.g. if a candidate withdraws less than 12 days before the second round, or if there are no other candidates who can replace a candidate who has withdrawn), the remaining candidate must win over 50% of the second-round vote to be elected president, or the election will be declared void.

Voters must be Ukrainian citizens and at least 18 years old on the election day.

There are no requirements for a minimum voter turnout.

Until the 2010 election, Ukrainian voters had the option to vote "against all candidates"; however, this option was removed in 2011 after changes to electoral legislation.

== Results ==
Where available, this table shows percentages as reported by the Central Election Commission of Ukraine; these may differ from percentages calculated based on the valid vote only.

References for results can be found in the "year" column
	First round			Second round		
Year	Winner	Runner-up	No. of other candidates	Winner	Runner-up	Notes
1991	Leonid Kravchuk; Independent; 61.59%	Viacheslav Chornovil; Rukh; 23.27%	4	-	-	Kravchuk won absolute majority in first round; no second round needed
1994	Leonid Kuchma; Independent; 37.72%	Leonid Kravchuk; Independent; 31.27%	5	Leonid Kuchma; Independent; 52.10%	Leonid Kravchuk; Independent; 45.06%	
1999	Leonid Kuchma; Independent; 36.49%	Petro Symonenko; KPU; 22.24%	11	Leonid Kuchma; Independent; 56.25%	Petro Symonenko; KPU; 37.80%	So far, the only successful re-election bid by an incumbent President of Ukraine
2004	Viktor Yushchenko; Independent (Our Ukraine Bloc); 39.90%	Viktor Yanukovych; Party of Regions; 39.26%	22	Viktor Yushchenko; Independent (Our Ukraine Bloc); 51.99%	Viktor Yanukovych; Party of Regions; 44.20%	After election fraud leading to Orange Revolution, second round invalidated by Supreme Court of Ukraine and re-run; table shows re-run results
2010	Viktor Yanukovych; Party of Regions; 35.32%	Yulia Tymoshenko; Batkivshchyna; 25.05%	16	Viktor Yanukovych; Party of Regions; 48.95%	Yulia Tymoshenko; Batkivshchyna; 45.47%	Incumbent President Viktor Yushchenko eliminated in first round with 5% of vote
2014	Petro Poroshenko; Independent (UDAR); 54.70%	Yulia Tymoshenko; Batkivshchyna; 12.81%	19	-	-	Election originally scheduled for 2015, but brought forward after Revolution of Dignity; Poroshenko succeeded acting President Oleksandr Turchynov. Poroshenko won absolute majority in first round; no second round needed
2019	Volodymyr Zelenskyy; Servant of the People; 30.24%	Petro Poroshenko; Independent (BPP); 15.95%	37	Volodymyr Zelenskyy; Servant of the People; 73.23%	Petro Poroshenko; Independent (BPP); 24.45%	Largest-ever margin so far

== Voter turnout ==
The highest voter turnout–84 percent–was recorded during the first election in December 1991.

== See also ==
- Elections in Ukraine
