= Next Ukrainian local elections =

- TBD

Ukrainian local elections were originally scheduled to be held in 2025, however, due to the ongoing Russo-Ukrainian War and the constitutional inability for Ukraine to hold elections during a period of martial law, elections were not held and no date for a future local election is yet set. The last local elections were held in 2020.

== Background ==
The previous local elections were held according to schedule on 25 October 2020. According to Constitution of Ukraine the term of office of the heads of villages and towns and the council members of these villages and towns is five years. However, due to the ongoing Russo-Ukrainian War and the ongoing period of martial law (that was introduced in 2022 following the Russian invasion of the same year) no local elections were held in 2025. The Ukrainian Constitution bans the holding of elections during martial law and it states that the electoral process should start within a month from the cancellation of the state of martial law. Article 19 of the Ukrainian constitution bans presidential, parliamentary, and local elections. Article 19 of the previous version of the law adopted in 2000 included the same provision.

On 26 February 2025, after a previous failed vote on a similar resolution, the Verkhovna Rada (Ukraine's national parliament) passed a resolution reaffirming that elections should not be held during martial law, and also pledged to hold a presidential election upon the conclusion of the Russo-Ukrainian War.

By late December 2025 the issue of the date of local elections was not yet raised in the Verkhovna Rada, but they did form a special working group preparing a bill on holding presidential elections under martial law.
