= Next Ukrainian parliamentary election =

Parliamentary election in Ukraine

- TBA

All 450 (possibly 300) seats in the Verkhovna Rada 226 (possibly 151) seats needed for a majority
- Opinion polls
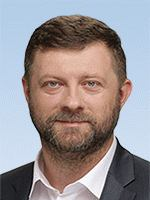

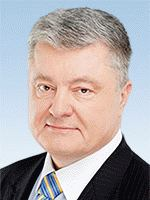

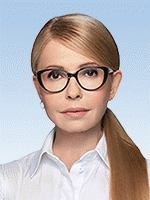

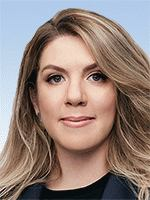

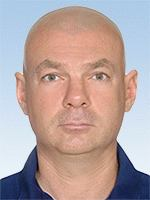
| Leader | Oleksandr Korniyenko | Petro Poroshenko | Yulia Tymoshenko |
| Party | Servant of the People | European Solidarity | Batkivshchyna |
| Leader since | 17 November 2025 | 31 May 2019 | 9 July 1999 |
| Last election | 254 seats, 43.16% | 25 seats, 8.11% | 26 seats, 8.19% |
| Current seats | 226 | 26 | 24 |
| Leader | Kira Rudik | Ihor Palytsia |
| Party | Holos | For the Future |
| Leader since | 12 March 2020 | 20 May 2020 |
| Last election | 20 seats, 5.83% | Did not contest |
| Current seats | 19 | 18 |
Incumbent Prime Minister
Serhii Koretskyi
Independent

Parliamentary elections are expected to take place in Ukraine to elect members of the Verkhovna Rada after the end of the Russo-Ukrainian war. According to the Ukrainian electoral code, the electoral process should start within a month from the cancellation of the state of martial law that was introduced in 2022 following the Russian invasion. The previous parliamentary election in Ukraine was held on 21 July 2019.

== Background ==
The previous parliamentary elections in 2019 were snap ones, called in July instead of the regular constitutionally-prescribed late October date. The first meeting of the elected deputies took place on 29 August 2019. According to Article 77 of the Constitution, regular elections to the Verkhovna Rada (the parliament of Ukraine) take place on the last Sunday of October of the fifth year of parliamentary powers. Thus, if not for the war, the regular parliamentary elections would have taken place on 29 October 2023.

In 2021, there were rumors that President Volodymyr Zelenskyy would call for snap elections in 2021, but also that he could use a provision to "collide" parliament's term with the 2024 Ukrainian presidential election.

=== Postponement ===
Elections are not allowed under martial law in Ukraine. Article 10 of Ukraine's "On the Legal Regime of Martial Law", adopted in 2015, stipulates that the powers of the president, parliament, and Cabinet of Ministers of Ukraine cannot be terminated under martial law, while Article 19 bans presidential, parliamentary, and local elections; Article 19 of the previous version of the law adopted in 2000 included the same provision. Martial law in Ukraine has been in effect since 24 February 2022, in response to the Russian invasion of Ukraine.

According to Article 83 of the Constitution, if the five-year authority of the Verkhovna Rada expires while martial law is in effect, its authority is extended until the first meeting of the next convocation of the Verkhovna Rada elected after the end of martial law. Electoral rights are not listed in Article 64 of the Constitution among the rights and freedoms that cannot be withheld in the state of martial law.

A survey conducted by the Razumkov Centre in September 2023 showed that only 15% of those surveyed supported holding elections during wartime, while 64% were against. Similarly, a September 2023 survey conducted by Rating for the International Republican Institute, 62% replied that considering the war, if a decision about the necessity of elections is to be made, the elections should begin to be held only after the war, even if this means waiting even longer [than March 2025]. A poll released by KIIS in November 2023 reported that 81% of Ukrainians did not want presidential or parliamentary elections until the war was over.

On 22 June 2023, President Zelenskyy announced that the elections would not be held as scheduled in 2023 due to ongoing martial law, and would be held in 2024 only if martial law ended by then. On 17 August 2023, martial law was extended for a further 90 days until 15 November 2023, which means the election could not take place on 29 October 2023 as originally planned. In November 2023, all political parties represented in the Verkhovna Rada signed a memorandum in which they agreed to postpone holding elections until after martial law has ended. On 26 February 2025, after a previous failed vote on a similar resolution, the Verkhovna Rada passed a resolution reaffirming that elections should not be held during martial law, and also pledged to hold a presidential election upon the conclusion of the Russo-Ukrainian War. On 6 March 2025 opposition politicians Petro Poroshenko and Yulia Tymoshenko, after having confirmed that they had held discussions with United States representatives, confirmed that they still opposed elections held during wartime.

== Electoral system ==
On 1 January 2020 the latest revision of the electoral code of Ukraine took effect. It states that all deputies are elected on a party list in one nationwide constituency with a 5% election threshold with open regional lists of candidates for deputies. The new election law abolishes the single-member constituency system used since the 2012 parliamentary election. (Note: Previous electoral reform passed in July 2019 also made all 450 members only elected by open list proportional representation; but it would not come into force until 1 December 2023.) Under the previous system, the 450 members of the Verkhovna Rada were elected by two methods; 225 by closed list proportional representation in a nationwide constituency with a 5% threshold, and 225 in single-member constituencies by first-past-the-post voting.

On 4 February 2020, the parliament approved in the first reading (with 236 votes) a presidential bill to reduce the number of parliamentary deputies from 450 to 300. To do so, the Ukrainian Constitution needs to be altered, and this will require at least 300 parliamentary votes.

== Parties ==
The table below lists parties currently represented in the Verkhovna Rada.

| Parties | Leader(s) | Parliamentary leader(s) | Ideology | Position | Seats | |
| Parties | Leader(s) | Parliamentary leader(s) | Ideology | Position | Last election | Before election |
|---|---|---|---|---|---|---|
| Servant of the People | Oleksandr Korniyenko | Davyd Arakhamia | Centrism | Centre | 254 / 450 | 226 / 450 |
| European Solidarity | Petro Poroshenko | Iryna Herashchenko; Artur Herasymov | Liberal conservatism | Centre-right | 25 / 450 | 26 / 450 |
| Batkivshchyna | Yulia Tymoshenko | | Social democracy | Centre-left | 26 / 450 | 24 / 450 |
| Holos | Kira Rudyk | Oleksandra Ustinova | Liberalism | Centre-right | 20 / 450 | 19 / 450 |
| For the Future | Ihor Palytsia | Taras Batenko | Populism | Centre-right | Did not exist | 18 / 450 |

=== Former party ===
| Parties | Leader(s) | Parliamentary leader(s) | Ideology | Position | Seats | |
| Parties | Leader(s) | Parliamentary leader(s) | Ideology | Position | Last election | Before election |
|---|---|---|---|---|---|---|
| Opposition Platform — For Life | Yuriy Boyko; Vadim Rabinovich | | Russophilia | Centre | 43 / 450 | Banned |

=== Suspended parties ===
Martial law in Ukraine was declared on 24 February 2022. On 15 March 2022, the Verkhovna Rada deprived opposition MP Illia Kyva of his mandate.

On 20 March 2022, the activities of several political parties were suspended by the National Security and Defense Council of Ukraine for the period of martial law:

- Derzhava
- Left Opposition
- Nashi
- Opposition Bloc
- Opposition Platform — For Life
- Party of Shariy
- Progressive Socialist Party of Ukraine
- Socialist Party of Ukraine
- Socialists
- Union of Left Forces
- Volodymyr Saldo Bloc

== Opinion polls ==
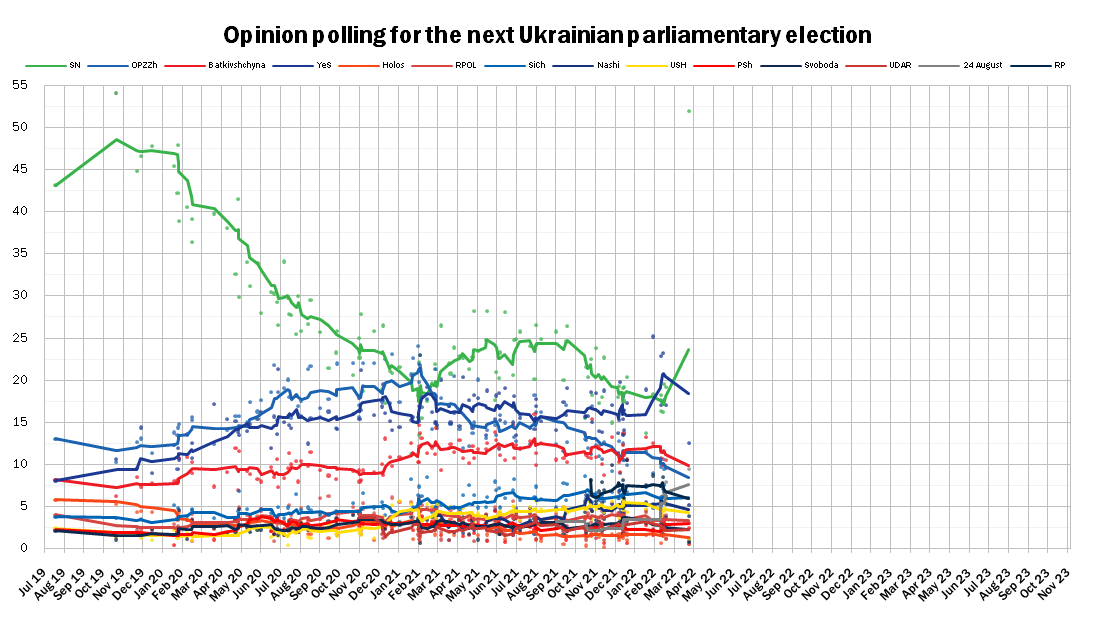

== See also ==
- 2019 Ukrainian parliamentary election
- Next Ukrainian presidential election
