= Lana Zerkal =

Ukrainian diplomat

- Лана Зеркаль
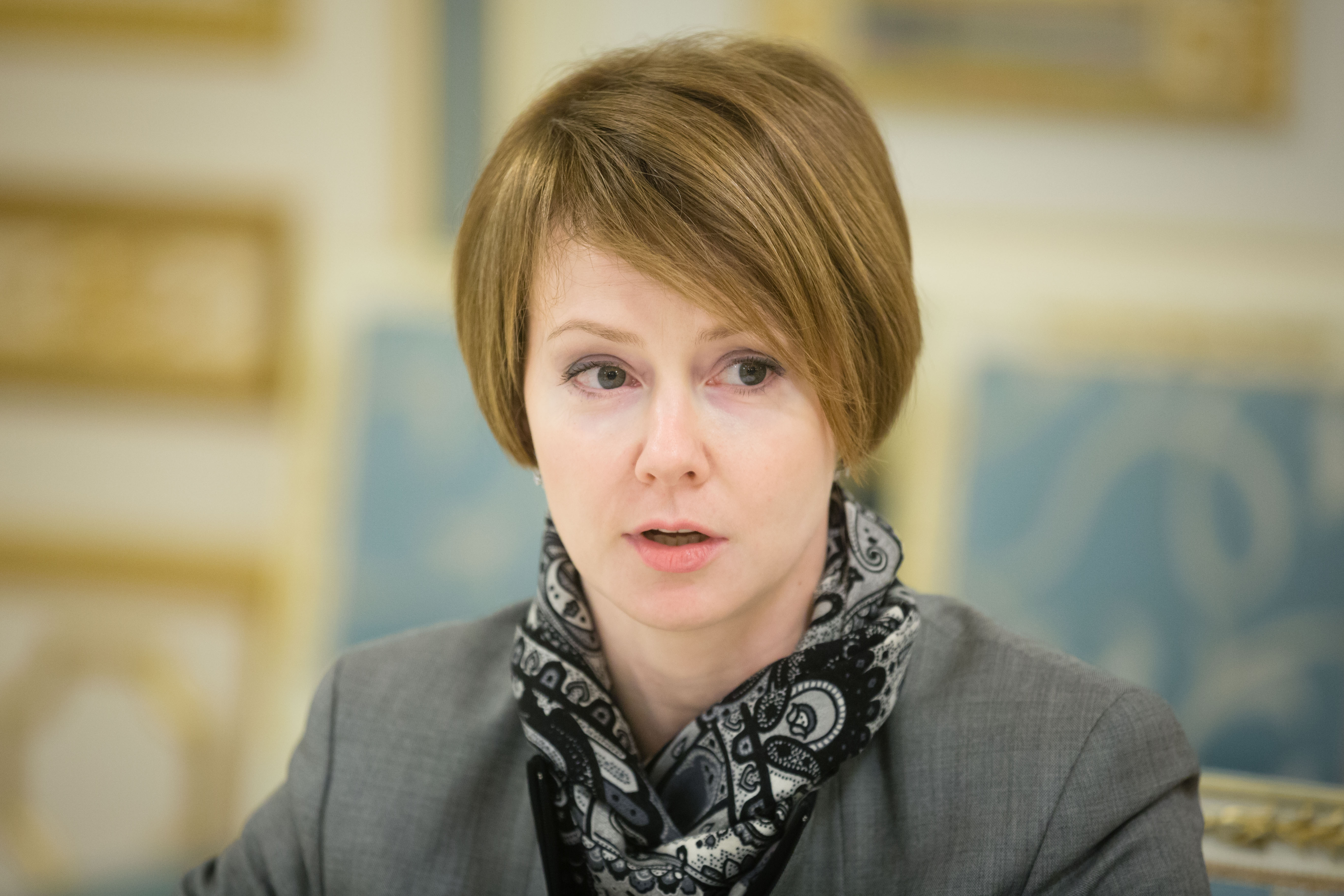
- Zerkal in 2017

Deputy Minister of Foreign Affairs (Ukraine) for the European Integration
- In office 20 August 2014 – 2019

Director of Department on Liaison with State Authorities, Ministry of Justice
- In office 2011–2013

Director of the State Department on Approximation of Legislation, Ministry of Justice (Ukraine)
- In office 2005–2011

Director of Department of International Law, Ministry of Justice (Ukraine)
- In office 2001–2005

Personal details
- Born: 24 June 1973 (age 53) Kyiv, Ukrainian SSR, Soviet Union
- Children: 2
- Education: Taras Shevchenko National University of Kyiv

Olena Volodymyrivna Zerkal (Ukrainian: Олена Володимирівна Зеркаль; born 24 June 1973), widely known as Lana Zerkal, is a Ukrainian diplomat. Former Deputy Minister of Foreign Affairs of Ukraine for the European Integration, appointed in office in 2014. She also served for 12 years at the Ministry of Justice (Ukraine) since 2001 as the Director of the Department of International Law (2001–2005), Director of the State Department on Approximation of Legislation (2005–2011) and as the Director of the Department on Liaison with State Authorities (2011–2013).

== Biography ==
In 1998, Olena graduated from the Law Faculty of the Taras Shevchenko National University of Kyiv with a Master of Law. In 2008, she also obtained a Master of International Economic Relations degree. She speaks fluent English and basic French.

=== Career ===
From January 1991 to February 1992, she was a laboratory assistant at Taras Shevchenko National University of Kyiv.

From February 1992 to May 1994, she was the Secretary General Director of "Insoftteh".

From May 1994 to June 2000, she was a legal adviser of CJSC "Ukrpobuttehnika".

From December 2001 to January 2005, she served as the Deputy Director, Director of International Law of the Ministry of Justice (Ukraine).

From January 2005 to April 2011, she was the Director of the State Department for Legal Approximation of the Ministry of Justice (Ukraine).

In 2005, delegate of Ukraine at the conference of Ukraine and Poland on European integration.

In 2006, member of the Standing Ukrainian-Lithuanian commission for European integration.

From 2007 to 2013, Ukrainian delegation member on Association Agreement between Ukraine and the European Union.

In 2008, she was a Ukrainian delegate in negotiations with the European Commission on the Framework Agreement between the European Community and Ukraine on the general principles of Ukraine's participation in the Community programs.

In 2010, Ukrainian delegation member in negotiations with the European Commission regarding amendment of the Agreement between Ukraine and the EU on visa facilitation.

From April 2011 to May 2013, she was the Director of interaction with the authorities of the Ministry of Justice (Ukraine).

Since 2011, she is a member of the board of the State Penitentiary Service of Ukraine.

In 2012, she became a member of the Interagency Coordinating Council for the construction of an electronic register of patients of Ministry of Healthcare (Ukraine).

Since 2012, she has served as a member of the board of the State Registration Service of Ukraine.

On 10 April 2013, she participated in the Verkhovna Rada session on Human Rights, National Minorities and International Relations.

=== Deputy Foreign Minister, 2014–2019 ===
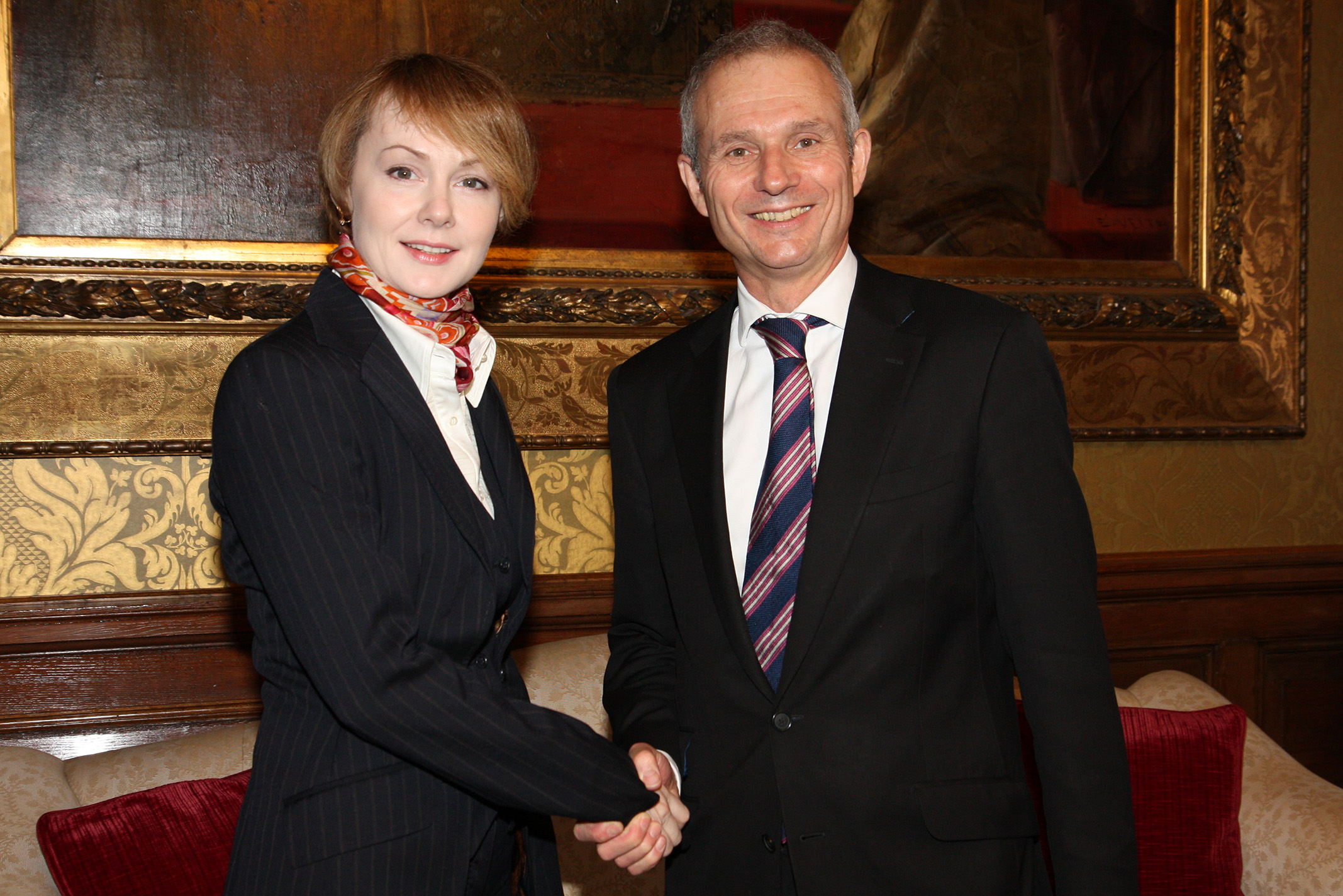
Zerkal meets with Minister for Europe David Lidington in London on 9 December 2014.

Olena was appointed Deputy Minister of Foreign Affairs of Ukraine on 20 August 2014, as one of the most experienced professionals in the field of European integration. She participated in all negotiations rounds on political and economic parts of the Association Agreement, representing the Ministry of Justice of Ukraine during the process.

Olena also represented Ukraine from 6–9 March 2017 at the International Court of Justice in The Hague, during public hearings on the case of Ukraine accusing Russia of supporting international terrorism and violation of human rights in occupied and uncontrolled territories of Ukraine, including Crimea and parts of Donbas.

Zerkal is the Agent of Ukraine in Dispute Concerning Coastal State Rights in the Black Sea, Sea of Azov, and Kerch Strait (Ukraine v. the Russian Federation). Under a presidential decrees signed on 21 May 2019 by newly inaugurated President Volodymyr Zelenskyy Zerkal was appointed Deputy Head of the Presidential Administration of Ukraine. But a few hours later the text of the decree disappeared from the site of the president, according to Ukrayinska Pravda Zerkal did agree to be the only authorized representative of the international courts of Ukraine concerning Russia, but not to be a deputy head of the administration.

She resigned the post of the deputy foreign minister on 28 November 2019.

== Other activities ==
- World Economic Forum (WEF), Member of the Europe Policy Group (since 2017)

== Recognition ==
- Ukraine : Distinguished Lawyer of Ukraine
- Ukraine : Honorable Certificate of Cabinet of Minister of Ukraine
- Ukraine : Insignia of the Ministry of Justice of Ukraine "For Merits" (August 2012)
- Ukraine : State employee, 3rd rank (April 2009)
- Ukraine : State employee, 5th rank (March 2005)
