= Party of Shariy =

Political party in Ukraine

Party of Shariy Партія Шарія
- Leader: Anatoly Shariy
- Chairperson: Olha Shariy
- Founded: 3 February 2015 (as United Ukraine) 6 June 2019 (as Party of Shariy)
- Banned: 16 June 2022 (pending appeal) 6 September 2022 (final appeal dismissed by the Supreme Court of Ukraine)
- Headquarters: Kharkiv
- Ideology: Libertarianism; Russophilia; Euroscepticism
- Political position: Right-wing
- Colours: Red; White
- Verkhovna Rada: 0 / 450 (0%)
- Regions: 52 / 43,122 (0.1%)
- Odesa Oblast Council: 6 / 84 (7%)

Website
- sharij.com.ua

The Party of Shariy (Ukrainian: Партія Шарія, romanized: Partiia Shariia; Russian: Партия Шария, romanized: Partiya Shariya, PSh) is a banned political party in Ukraine founded by political blogger Anatoly Shariy. Its official proclaimed ideology is libertarianism.

On 22 March 2022, during the Russian invasion of Ukraine, the National Security and Defense Council of Ukraine decided to suspend the Party of Shariy because of alleged ties with Russia. An Administrative Court of Appeal banned the party on 16 June 2022. The party exercised its right to appeal to the Supreme Court of Ukraine. On 6 September 2022, the Supreme Court rejected this appeal and thus finally banned its activities in Ukraine. The reasons given for banning the party were: destabilization of the social and political situation in Ukraine, spread of anti-Ukrainian propaganda regarding the change of the constitutional system by violent means, violation of the sovereignty and territorial integrity of Ukraine, propaganda of war, violence in conditions of military aggression of the Russian Federation.

== History ==
=== Creation ===
In the beginning of June 2019, Ukrainian blogger Anatoly Shariy recorded a video in which he announced the establishment of his own political party. Shortly thereafter, he published a video splash screen on his pages in social networks, in which he throws a red balloon towards the audience. Shariy did not explain what this means, but on his website there was a message that hinted about creating a party. Later on, the red balloon became a symbol of the party and its pre-election campaign.

The party was created by renaming the political party United Ukraine. United Ukraine had been registered in February 2015. On 6 June 2019, the Party of Shariy was officially registered in Ukraine. The party took part in the 2019 Ukrainian parliamentary election. The eponymous leader of the party, Shariy, was denied registration by the Central Election Commission of Ukraine as a candidate for the election. This was on the grounds that he did not meet the requirement of a term of five-year residence in the country immediately preceding the elections, as he left Ukraine in January 2012 and did not come back ever since.

=== 2019 parliamentary elections ===
In the 2019 parliamentary election the party gained 327,152 votes (2.23% of total, position #10). As the party did not receive 5% of the vote, it did not win any parliamentary seats. The party also failed to win a constituency seat. It was most successful in the east and south of Ukraine: according to exit polls, 69% of the party's votes came from these regions. "The Party of Shariy" took fourth place in the electoral district abroad with 4.72% of the voters.

As the party won more than 2% of votes, it was originally entitled to funding from the budget for its support. However, on 2 October 2019, the Verkhovna Rada adopted the draft law No. 1029, which deprived parties of state funding that had won less than 5 per cent of the vote. After this law was adopted, Party of Shariy lost about 441,511 thousand euros in state funding.

=== 2020 regional elections ===
Together with the Opposition Bloc, the Party of Shariy was considered a competitor to the pro-Russian Opposition Platform — For Life in the 2020 Ukrainian local elections. However, the leader of the Opposition Platform — For Life, Viktor Medvedchuk declared that he did not view the Party of Shariy as a competitor, but as allies.

The party won 52 seats in local councils in east and south Ukraine.

=== 2022 Russian invasion of Ukraine/banning of the party ===
On 15 February 2022, in the run-up to Russia's 2022 invasion of Ukraine, the local deputy of the Party of Shariy in Odesa spoke out against support for territorial self-defense units, calling them "bandits." She remarked that Russian military exercises had already ended.

On 22 March 2022, the Party of Shariy was one of several political parties suspended by the National Security and Defense Council, along with Derzhava, Left Opposition, Nashi, the Opposition Bloc, Opposition Platform — For Life, the Progressive Socialist Party of Ukraine, the Socialist Party of Ukraine, the Union of Left Forces, and the Volodymyr Saldo Bloc.

The party's faction in the Kharkiv City Council was disbanded due to lack of members.

On 16 June 2022, the Eighth Administrative Court of Appeal banned the party. The property of the party and all its branches were transferred to the state. The decision was open to appeal at the Supreme Court of Ukraine.

At its meeting of 6 September 2022 the Supreme Court rejected the appeal of Party of Shariy and thus banned its activities in Ukraine. The reasons given for banning the party were: destabilization of the social and political situation in Ukraine, spread of anti-Ukrainian propaganda regarding the change of the constitutional system by violent means, violation of the sovereignty and territorial integrity of Ukraine, propaganda of war, violence in conditions of military aggression of the Russian Federation.

In January 2023, members of a clandestine cell of the Party of Shariy were arrested by the Security Service of Ukraine in Dnipro. During the search of its premises, documents including instructions to provoke mass riots were discovered.

== Party members ==
The party's political council consists of two people - it is headed by Olha Shariy and the other member is her first deputy Oleksandr Vyunyk. According to the Unified State Register, in June 2020 the party had 16 regional and 1 city (Kyiv) local branches.

== Scandals ==
=== Relations with Russian ultra-nationalists and anti-government coups ===
Antonina Beloglazova, who was third on the party's list of candidates in 2019 and editor of the Shariy website, collaborated in Russia in 2015–2016 with the National Liberation Movement (NCD), which aims to "restore Russia's sovereignty". This movement has been repeatedly observed at various pro-Putin events. Following these revelations, she lost her position in the party.

Konstantin Mamrosenko, Beloglazova's brother, who heads department "B" in the "Shariy Party", together with "Motorola" took part in the seizure of the Kharkiv Regional State Administration during the so-called "Russian Spring" in 2014.

Tarasy Plaksiy, the curator of the Shariy party in Khmelnytskyi, Chernivtsi and Ternopil regions, was at the Alabino military training ground in the Russian Federation in 2017, where Russian special forces are stationed, and took part in the patriotic event "Fight for Russia Day".

== Threats and attacks ==
=== On supporters and party members ===
On 24 June 2020 in Kharkiv, a supporter of the " Party of Shariy" - Nikita Rozhenko was beaten. Criminal proceedings on the attack on Nikita Rozhenko, coordinator of the "Party of Shariy" in Kharkiv, are being investigated as an attempt on murder committed by prior conspiracy of a group of people. In Kharkiv, on 1 July 2020, the local representative of the Party of Shariy was sprinkled with green paint. A "safari" on the Party members was openly announced by the National Corps.

=== On party opponents ===
According to the journalist Andriy Kachor (Ukrainian: Андрій Качор) - he received threats from Shariy Party supporters after the publication on his site about the burning of Shariy Party agitation materials by unknown Vinnytsia people.

The police of Vinnytsia region identified the attacker on the chief editor of the local newspaper Andrey Kachor and found no connection between the attack and Kachor's conflict with video blogger Anatoliy Shariy.

"The police said they had found the man who had beaten Kachor. The attacker was a 27-year-old resident of Vinnytsia. According to him, there was a verbal altercation between him and Kachor in the cafe, which turned into a fight. The man denies any relation with the video blogger Anatolia Shariy, and calls the conflict situational."

== Controversies ==
The party is accused of russophilia. The leader, Anatoly Shariy, strongly denies the allegations.
