= Smart Politics (Ukraine) =

Smart Politics Розумна полiтика
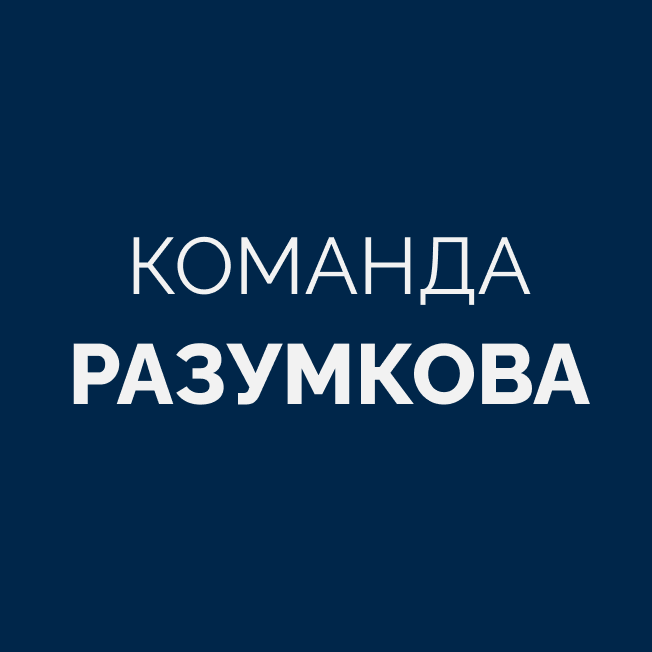
- Abbreviation: RP
- Leader: Dmytro Razumkov
- Founder: Dmytro Razumkov
- Founded: 8 November 2021 (parliamentary group); 24 January 2022 (Razumkov Team)
- Registered: 16 November 2021 (parliamentary group)
- Split from: Servant of the People
- Ideology: Anti-corruption; Reformism; Moderate conservatism
- Colours: Blue; Red
- Slogan: Настав час позитивних змін і розумної політики! ('It is time for positive change and smart politics!')
- Verkhovna Rada: 25 / 450

Website
- razumkov.team

Smart Politics (Ukrainian: Розумна Політика, romanized: Rozumna Polityka, RP) is an inter-factional parliamentary group in the Verkhovna Rada (the national parliament of Ukraine), created by former parliamentary speaker Dmytro Razumkov on 8 November 2021. The group currently includes 25 deputies, 19 from Servant of the People, two from Batkivshchyna and four independents.

== History ==
Dmytro Razumkov is a former leader of Ukrainian president Volodymyr Zelenskyy's Servant of the People party. In the 2019 Ukrainian parliamentary election, Razumkov headed the party list of Servant of the People. In the election the party won 124 seats on the nationwide party list and 130 constituency seats.

On 29 August 2019, Razumkov was elected Chairman of the Verkhovna Rada (Ukraine's national parliament).

On 7 October 2021, the Verkhovna Rada voted to dismiss Razumkov from his post as Chairman of the Parliament. Four days earlier President Zelenskyy had stated that he was "not a member of our team anymore."

On 8 November 2021, Razumkov founded the inter-factional parliamentary group Smart Politics. The group included 25 deputies, 19 from Servant of the People, two from Batkivshchyna and four independents.

On 16 November 2021, Razumkov confirmed that he would create a political party.

In January 2022, Razumkov founded an NGO called Team Razumkov that would form the backbone of the new party. Also in January 2022, Mukachevo mayor Andriy Baloha joined this project.
