= Dmytro Razumkov =

Ukrainian politician (born 1983)

- Дмитро Разумков
- Razumkov in 2021

Chairman of the Verkhovna Rada
- In office 29 August 2019 – 7 October 2021
- President: Volodymyr Zelenskyy
- Preceded by: Andriy Parubiy
- Succeeded by: Ruslan Stefanchuk

People's Deputy of Ukraine
- Incumbent
- Assumed office 29 August 2019

Leader of Servant of the People
- In office 27 May 2019 – 10 November 2019
- Preceded by: Ivan Bakanov
- Succeeded by: Oleksandr Kornienko

Personal details
- Born: 8 October 1983 (age 42) Berdychiv, Zhytomyr Oblast, Ukrainian SSR, Soviet Union
- Party: Smart Politics (since 2021)
- Other political affiliations: Servant of the People (2019–2021); Party of Regions (2006–2010)
- Children: 2
- Parents: Oleksandr Razumkov (father); Natalia Kudrya (mother)
- Education: Taras Shevchenko National University of Kyiv; National State Tax Service University
- Occupation: political technologist political analyst

Dmytro Oleksandrovych Razumkov (Ukrainian: Дмитро Олександрович Разумков; born 8 October 1983) is a Ukrainian politician and former chairman of the Verkhovna Rada (from August 2019 to 7 October 2021). Previously he was leader of the Servant of the People party. In the 2019 Ukrainian parliamentary election he led the party to a win of 124 seats on the nationwide party list and 130 constituency seats.

Razumkov was a member of the National Security and Defense Council of Ukraine from 6 September 2019 to 15 October 2021. He is currently an independent deputy in the Verkhovna Rada, Ukraine's parliament.

== Biography ==
Razumkov was born on 8 October 1983 in Berdychiv, Zhytomyr Region, to Komsomol activist Oleksandr Razumkov and theater actress Natalia Kudri. His father was a former Deputy Secretary of the National Security and Defense Council of Ukraine. Dmytro has a half-brother Hlib who was born in the civil marriage of Oleksandr Razumkov with Yulia Mostova, the editor-in-chief of "Mirror of the Week". Hlib was adopted by Anatoliy Hrytsenko, who married Mostova in 2003.

Razumkov graduated with honors from the Institute of International Relations at the Taras Shevchenko National University of Kyiv with a degree in International Economic Relations and also received a law degree with honors from the National State Tax Service University.

From 2006 to 2010, Razumkov was a member of the Party of Regions. In an interview with ZIK on 2 April 2019, he explained that he had never been a political technologist of the Party of Regions and had not been in "Young Regions", the party’s youth wing. In July 2007, he started working in the Ministry of Regional Development and Construction of Ukraine in the Department for Ensuring the Activities of the Minister and the Board of the Ministry of Regional Development and Construction of Ukraine. After that he worked in the Cabinet of Ministers of Ukraine.

He was assistant to Member of Ukrainian Parliament Valeriya Matyukha (Party of Regions) in 2006–07.

In 2009–2011, Razumkov worked in management positions in the commercial sector. In 2013–2014, he was the advisor to Andriy Nikolaenko, Head of the Kirovohrad Regional State Administration.

In 2015–2019, Razumkov was the managing director of the Ukrainian Politconsulting Group.

Razumkov returned to professional politics as a political advisor to Volodymyr Zelenskyy's 2019 presidential campaign. Zelenskyy won the election; in the second round of the election he defeated incumbent president Petro Poroshenko with nearly 73% of the vote to Poroshenko's 25%.

Razumkov became the leader of Zelenskyy's Servant of the People party. In the 2019 Ukrainian parliamentary election, Razumkov headed the party list of Servant of the People. In the election, the party won 124 seats on the nationwide party list and 130 constituency seats.

On 29 August 2019, Razumkov was elected Chairman of the Verkhovna Rada. During his election, he received the largest support of people's deputies since the founding of Verkhovna Rada, with 382 parliamentarians voted for his candidacy. He is co-chair of the Interparliamentary Assembly of the Verkhovna Rada, the Seimas of Lithuania and the Sejm and the Senate of Poland, Co-chair of the Interparliamentary Assembly of the Parliament of Georgia, the Parliament of Moldova and the Verkhovna Rada, and chairman of the executive committee of the National Parliamentary Group in the Inter-Parliamentary Union.

On 6 September 2019, Razumkov was appointed as a member of the National Security and Defense Council of Ukraine.

In November 2019, Oleksandr Kornienko succeed Razumkov as head of Servant of the People.

In December 2019, Razumkov was included in the list of the 100 most influential Ukrainians by Focus magazine for the first time, taking 7th place. In August 2020, he was named the 12th most influential Ukrainian by Ukrainian media outlet Novoye Vremya.

He has served as a member of the National Investment Council since 24 December 2019.

On 7 October 2021, the Verkhovna Rada voted to dismiss Razumkov from his post as Chairman of the Parliament. Four days earlier President Zelenskyy had stated that he was "not a member of our team anymore." This followed conflict between Razumkov, Zelenskyy and the Servant of the People party, due to Razumkov's lack of support for Zelenskyy's de-oligarchisation law and imposition of sanctions on oligarch Viktor Medvedchuk. President Zelenskyy removed Razumkov from the National Security and Defense Council on 15 October 2021 and replaced him with Ruslan Stefanchuk, his successor as Chairman of the Verkhovna Rada.

Prior to his dismissal, Razumkov was booted out of the instant messenger chat groups of Servant of the People, the party he used to lead, and labelled as an "opposition politician" by the leader of the party's parliamentary faction. Razumkov is listed as an independent (not part of any party faction) on the parliament's website, although he has not actually been excluded from Servant of the People's parliamentary faction.

On 5 November 2021, Razumkov’s press secretary confirmed information about the forthcoming creation of a 25-member association of people’s deputies in the Ukrainian parliament headed by Razumkov. Servant of the People pre-emptively threatened to exclude party members who join the association. On 8 November, Razumkov published the list of MPs who intend to join the association, which includes 21 MPs from Servant of the People, two MPs from Fatherland, and two independents, as well as the official request to create the association. The inter-factional parliamentary group is named Smart Politics.

On 16 November 2021, Razumkov confirmed that he would create a political party. In January 2022, he founded an NGO called Team Razumkov that would form the backbone of the new party.

Razumkov is married and has two children. He lives in Kyiv.

== Political views ==
In 2019, Razumkov made a point of speaking Russian in public.

"As long as we have Russian aggression and as long as the Russian state wants to protect the Russian-speaking population, I use only Russian during broadcasts. Because I don't think it's necessary to come in tanks, come with machine guns and "green men" and protect me as a Russian-speaking population."

He believed that the issue of language is not relevant while the country is at war.

== See also ==
- List of members of the parliament of Ukraine, 2019–23

Political offices
Preceded by Andriy Parubiy	Chairman of the Verkhovna Rada; 2019–2021	Succeeded by Ruslan Stefanchuk
