= 9th Ukrainian Verkhovna Rada =

2019–present meeting of the Ukrainian parliament, Rada

(Ukraine) Verkhovna Rada of Ukraine of the 9th convocation
| ← | 8th Verkhovna Rada | 10th Verkhovna Rada | → |
- Seat composition of the 9th Verkhovna Rada

Overview
- Meeting place: Verkhovna Rada building
- Term: 29 August 2019 –
- Election: 2019 parliamentary election
- Government: Honcharuk Government (until 4 March 2020); Shmyhal Government (4 March 2020 – 17 July 2025); Svyrydenko Government (17 July 2025 - 12 July 2026); Koretskyi Government (from 16 July 2026)
- Website: rada.gov.ua
- Members: 390 / 450 (since 18 July 2026)
- Chairman: Ruslan Stefanchuk (from Servant of the People)
- First Deputy Chairperson: Oleksandr Kornienko (from Servant of the People)
- Second Deputy Chairperson: Olena Kondratiuk (from Batkivshchyna)
- Party control: Servant of the People

Sessions
- 1st: 29 August 2019 – 29 August 2019
- 2nd: 3 September 2019 – 17 January 2020
- 3rd: 4 February 2020 – 17 July 2020
- 4th: 1 September 2020 – 29 January 2021
- 5th: 2 February 2021 – 16 July 2021
- 6th: 7 September 2021 – 28 January 2022
- 7th: 1 February 2022 – 30 August 2022
- 8th: 6 September 2022 – 6 February 2023
- 9th: 7 February 2023 – 24 August 2023
- 10th: 5 September 2023 – 16 January 2024
- 11th: 6 February 2024 – 23 August 2024
- 12th: 3 September 2024 – 17 January 2025
- 13th: 4 February 2025 – 2 September 2025

The Verkhovna Rada of Ukraine of the 9th convocation (Ukrainian: Верховна Рада України IX скликання) is the current convocation of the legislative branch of the Verkhovna Rada, Ukraine's unicameral parliament. The 9th convocation meets at the Verkhovna Rada building in Kyiv, having begun its term on 29 August 2019, following the last session of the 8th Verkhovna Rada.

The 9th Verkhovna Rada's composition is based upon the results of the 21 July 2019 parliamentary election, which took place three months after the second round of the 2019 Ukrainian presidential election. Ukraine's head of state during the parliament's term is President Volodymyr Zelenskyy. Eleven parties were represented in the Verkhovna Rada, although only five of them surpassed the mandatory five percent election threshold to gain representation based on the proportional representation system.

About 80 percent of the members of parliament of this convocation were new to parliament; 83 deputies managed to get re-elected from the previous parliament and 13 deputies from earlier convocations. All deputies from the biggest party with 254 seats, Servant of the People, were political newcomers. 61 percent of the new MPs had never before been engaged in politics.

A total of 27 constituencies were not elected due to various crises taking place in the country. A total of 10 constituencies in the Autonomous Republic of Crimea and two in the City of Sevastopol were not elected due to the 2014 Crimean crisis and subsequent annexation of Crimea by Russia, while a further nine constituencies in Donetsk Oblast and six constituencies in Luhansk Oblast were not elected due to the ongoing War in Donbas. Elections in these regions can only take place after Ukraine re-establishes control over these territories.

Due to the 2022 full-scale Russian invasion of Ukraine, the activity of the largest opposition party, Opposition Platform — For Life, was suspended due to its alleged pro-Russian stance, for the duration of martial law.

== Major legislation ==
- 29 August 2019: Oleksiy Honcharuk is confirmed as prime minister with 290 votes in favor.
- 3 September 2019: Immunity from prosecution for lawmakers is canceled; 373 votes in favor.
- 4 February 2020: Bill to reduce the number of deputies from 450 to 300 is approved prior to a final vote to amend the constitution correspondingly; 236 votes in favor.
- 4 March 2020: Denis Shmyhal is confirmed as prime minister with 291 votes in favor.
- 31 March 2020: Bill on the land market, which makes it possible for citizens and legal entities to purchase agricultural land, is passed with 259 votes in favor.
- 23 September 2021: Bill on "de-oligarchization" passed with 279 votes in favor.
- 19 July 2021: MPs vote to approve the law on "national resistance" with 313 votes in favor.
- 7 October 2021: MPs vote to dismiss Dmytro Razumkov from his position as chairman with 284 votes in favor. Razumkov was replaced by his first deputy Ruslan Stefanchuk (also from Servant of the People) a day later.

== Leadership ==
=== Leadership (August 2019 – ) ===
On 29 August 2019, the parliament elected Dmytro Razumkov from Servant of the People as the Chairman of the Verkhovna Rada. On the same day, Razumkov officially announced all the names of parliamentary factions and deputy groups in parliament of the 9th convocation.

On 7 October 2021, Razumkov was removed from his position after a vote in which 284 MPs voted in favor of his dismissal. The dismissal was initiated by the ruling party Servant of the People after President Volodymyr Zelenskyy expressed disappointment in Razumkov for not supporting the party's initiatives and declaring that "he is not a member of our team anymore". Razumkov was replaced by his first deputy Ruslan Stefanchuk (also from Servant of the People) a day later.

| Office | Deputy | Vote | Since | Parliamentary affiliation |
|---|---|---|---|---|
| Chairman | Dmytro Razumkov | 382–26–0 | 29 August 2019 – 7 October 2021 | Non-affiliated |
| Chairman | Ruslan Stefanchuk | 261–3–63 | 8 October 2021 | Non-affiliated |
| First Deputy Chairman | Ruslan Stefanchuk | 330–26–40 | 29 August 2019 – 8 October 2021 | Non-affiliated |
| First Deputy Chairman | Oleksandr Kornienko | 256–4–80 | 19 October 2021 | Non-affiliated |
| Deputy Chairman | Olena Kondratiuk | 318–0–37 | 29 August 2019 | Non-affiliated |
| Faction leader(s) | Davyd Arakhamia | | 29 August 2019 | Servant of the People |
| Faction leader(s) | Yuriy Boyko and Vadim Rabinovich | | 29 August 2019 – 3 November 2022 | Opposition Platform — For Life |
| Faction leader(s) | Yuriy Boyko | | 3 November 2022 | Opposition Platform — For Life |
| Faction leader(s) | Artur Herasymov and Iryna Herashchenko | | 29 August 2019 | European Solidarity |
| Faction leader(s) | Yulia Tymoshenko | | 29 August 2019 | Batkivshchyna |
| Faction leader(s) | Yaroslav Zheleznyak | | 29 August 2019 – 17 December 2021 | Holos |
| Faction leader(s) | Oleksandra Ustinova | | 17 December 2021 | Holos |
| Group leader(s) | Viktor Bondar and Taras Batenko | | | For the Future |
| Group leader(s) | Oleh Kulinich | | 6 December 2019 | Dovira |

== Members ==
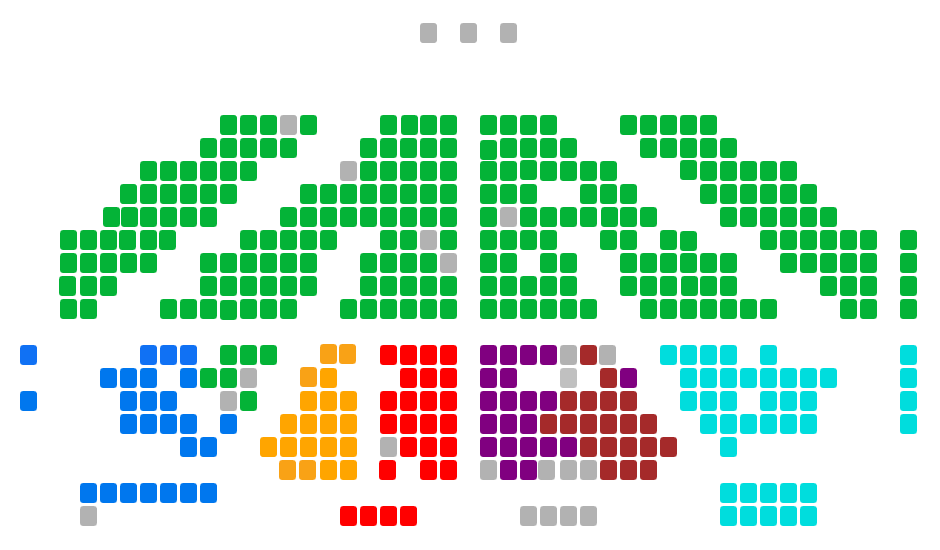
Location of parliamentary factions in the 9th Verkhovna Rada: – Servant of the People – OP — For Life – European Solidarity / – Batkivshchyna – Holos – vacant seats / – For the Future (deputy group) – Trust (deputy group) – non-faction members

== Parliamentary factions and groups ==
Government party (226)

- Servant of the People (226)

Government support (37)

- Dovira (parliamentary group) (19)
- For the Future (18)

Opposition (69)

- European Solidarity (26)
- Batkivshchyna (24)
- Holos (including the Justice parliamentary group) (19)

Others (58)

- Independents (20)
- Platform for Life and Peace (21)
- Restoration of Ukraine (17)

Vacant seats (60)

- Vacant (60)

== Committees ==
The Verkhovna Rada approved the composition of its 23 committees on 29 August 2019. This was done without a parliamentary debate, and to the dismay of some people's deputies who chanted: "shame!" and "what are you doing?". 19 of the 23 committees are headed by representatives of Servant of the People.

The committees and their management are as follows:

| Committee | Management |
|---|---|
| Agricultural and Land Policy | Oleksandr Haidu, Chair |
| Agricultural and Land Policy | Oleh Meidych, First Deputy |
| Agricultural and Land Policy | Ivan Chaikivskyi, Deputy |
| Anti-Corruption | Anastasiya Radina, Chair |
| Anti-Corruption | Olena Moshenets, First Deputy |
| Anti-Corruption | Volodymyr Kabachenko, Secretary |
| Budget | Roksolana Pidlasa, Chair |
| Budget | Ivan Krulko, First Deputy |
| Budget | Volodymyr Tsabal, Secretary |
| Economic Development | Dmytro Natalukha, Chair |
| Economic Development | Serhiy Taruta, First Deputy |
| Economic Development | Yaroslav Rushchyshyn, Secretary |
| Digital Transformation | Mykhailo Kriachko, Chair |
| Digital Transformation | Kira Rudyk, First Deputy |
| Digital Transformation | Serhiy Larin, Secretary (Note: Formerly a member of Opposition Platform — For Life.) |
| Education, Science, and Innovation | Serhiy Babak, Chair |
| Education, Science, and Innovation | Serhiy Koleboshyn, First Deputy |
| Education, Science, and Innovation | Natalya Pipa, Secretary |
| Energy and Utilities | Andriy Herus, Chair |
| Energy and Utilities | Oleksiy Kucherenko, First Deputy |
| Energy and Utilities | Yurii Shapovalov, Secretary |
| Environmental and Natural Resources | Oleh Bondarenko, Chair |
| Environmental and Natural Resources | Stepan Ivakhiv, First Deputy |
| Environmental and Natural Resources | Oleksandr Feldman, Secretary |
| Foreign Policy | Oleksandr Merezhko, Chair |
| Foreign Policy | Hryhoriy Nemyria, First Deputy |
| Foreign Policy | Andriy Sharaskin, Secretary |
| Freedom of Speech | Yaroslav Yurchyshyn, Chair |
| Freedom of Speech | Yevheniy Brahar, First Deputy |
| Freedom of Speech | Serhiy Shvets, Secretary |
| Humanitarian and Information Policy | Mykyta Poturaiev, Chair |
| Humanitarian and Information Policy | Iryna Konstankevych, First Deputy |
| Humanitarian and Information Policy | Oleksandr Abdullin, Secretary |
| Law Enforcement | Serhiy Ionushas, Chair |
| Law Enforcement | Andriy Osadchuk, First Deputy |
| Law Enforcement | Serhii Minko, Secretary |
| Legal | Denys Maslov, Chair |
| Legal | Vasyl Nimchenko, First Deputy |
| Legal | Oleh Makarov, Secretary |
| National Security, Defence, and Intelligence | Oleksandr Zavitnevych, Chair |
| National Security, Defence, and Intelligence | Yehor Cherniev, First Deputy |
| National Security, Defence, and Intelligence | Roman Kostenko, Secretary |
| Health | Mykhailo Radutskyi, Chair |
| Health | Valeriy Dubil, First Deputy |
| Health | Yana Zinkevych, Secretary |
| State Authority, Local Self-Government, and Regional and Urban Development | Olena Shuliak, Chair |
| State Authority, Local Self-Government, and Regional and Urban Development | Roman Lozynskyi, First Deputy |
| State Authority, Local Self-Government, and Regional and Urban Development | Dmytro Isaienko, Secretary |
| Rules of Procedure, Parliamentary Ethics, and Work Administration | Serhiy Kalchenko, Chair |
| Rules of Procedure, Parliamentary Ethics, and Work Administration | Serhiy Yevtushok, First Deputy |
| Rules of Procedure, Parliamentary Ethics, and Work Administration | Mykhailo Papiyev, Secretary |
| Social Policy and Protection of Veteran's Rights | Halyna Tretiakova, Chair |
| Social Policy and Protection of Veteran's Rights | Mykhailo Tsymbaliuk, First Deputy |
| Social Policy and Protection of Veteran's Rights | Mykola Babenko, Secretary |
| Transport and Infrastructure | Yuriy Kisiel, Chair |
| Transport and Infrastructure | Yulia Klymenko, First Deputy |
| Transport and Infrastructure | Hennadii Vatsak, Secretary |
| Youth and Sport | Andriy Kozhemiakin, Chair |
| Youth and Sport | Zhan Beleniuk, First Deputy |
| Youth and Sport | Hryhoriy Surkis, Secretary |
| Finance | Danylo Hetmantsev, Chair |
| Finance | Yaroslav Zheleznyak, First Deputy |
| Finance | Ihor Palytsia, Secretary |
