= Nataliya Pipa =

Ukrainian politician

- Наталія Піпа
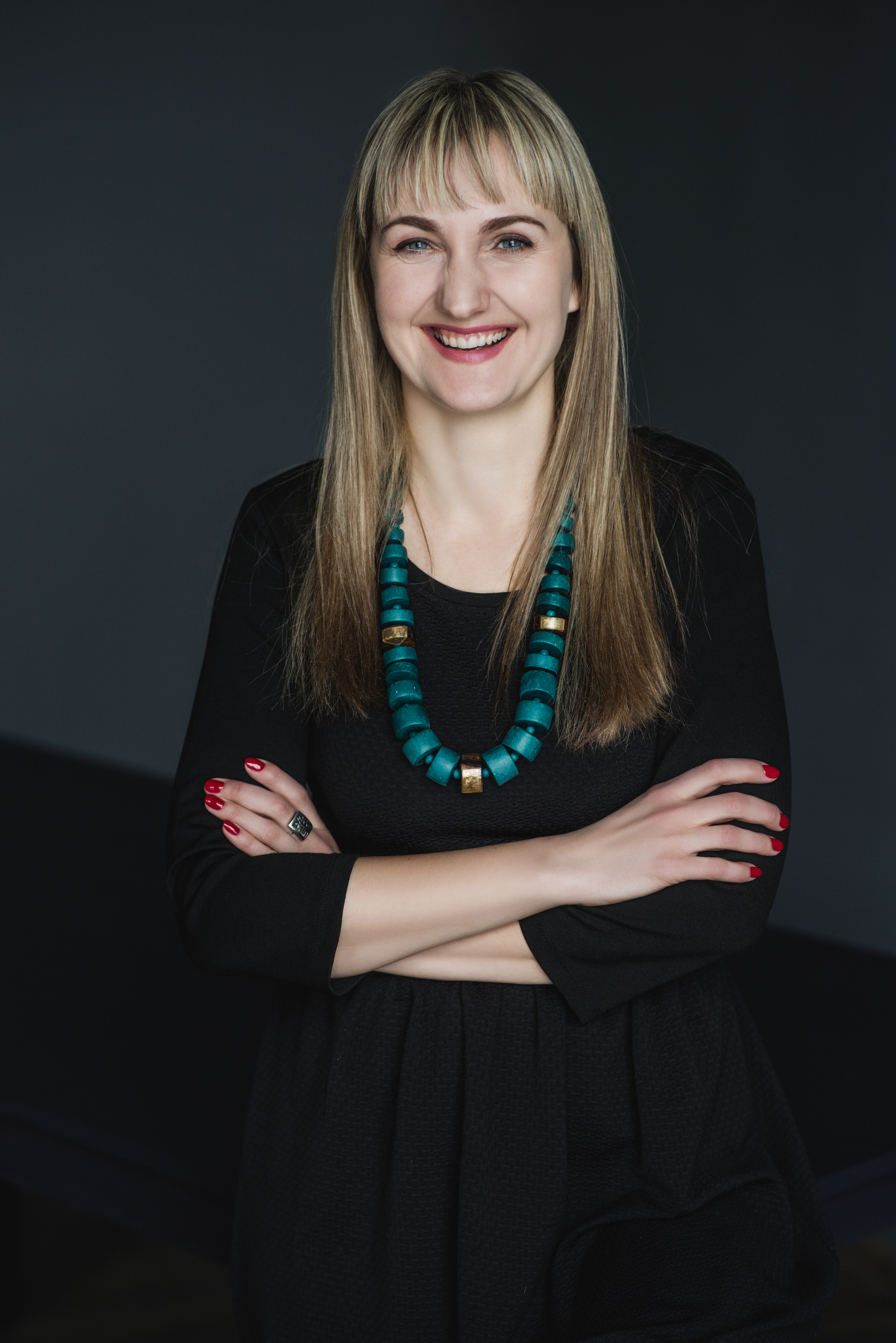

People's Deputy of Ukraine
- Incumbent
- Assumed office 29 August 2019
- Preceded by: Dmytro Dobrodomov
- Constituency: Lviv Oblast, No. 115

Personal details
- Born: 12 October 1983 (age 42) Lviv, Ukraine
- Party: Holos
- Other political affiliations: Justice; Ukrainian Galician Party (2015–2019)
- Education: Ukrainian Catholic University; University of Lviv
- Website: https://pipa.org.ua/

Nataliya Romanivna Pipa (Ukrainian: Наталія Романівна Піпа; born 12 October 1983) is a Ukrainian politician who has served as a People's Deputy of Ukraine representing constituency No. 115 since 2019. She is a member of the Holos parliamentary faction.

== Early life and career ==
In 1997, Pipa joined Plast, Ukraine's national scouting organisation. She was a member of the AIESEC from 2000 to 2004.

In 2000, Pipa graduated from Lviv Specialized Secondary School No. 8, where she studied the German language extensively. In 2005, she obtained her higher education in "Economic cybernetics" at the University of Lviv. In 2018, she graduated from the Ukrainian Catholic University, completing programs of study including the "Management of non-profit organizations", "Effective governance", and "Good governance for good leaders".

From 2004 to 2013, Pipa worked as an insurance broker at the "Expert" brokerage. Since 2013, she has been a manager of external relations (fundraiser) at the Dzherelo Centre for Children and Youth with Special Needs.

== Political career ==
Pipa entered politics in 2014, as a member of the Better Sykhiv protests that led to the establishment of the Square of Dignity in Lviv's southern Sykhivskyi District. Pipa is also responsible for the creation of the Sykhivskyi Green Path, an urban green space near Lviv's Dovzhenko Theatre, a lecture series from the City Workshop and Deutsche Gesellschaft für Internationale Zusammenarbeit, and a variety of eco-fairs and festivals with the intention of promoting environmental awareness in Lviv.

From 2015 to 2019, she was a member of the Ukrainian Galician Party, serving as the head of the Lviv city branch of the party from 2015 to 2016.

In the 2015 Ukrainian local elections, Pipa was an unsuccessful candidate for the Lviv Oblast Council and Lviv City Council in the Sykhivskyi District.

From November 2016, she was an assistant to Ihor Volodymyrovych Dyakovich, a deputy of the Lviv City Council.

During the 2019 Ukrainian parliamentary election, Pipa was the candidate of Holos in Ukraine's 115th electoral district. She was successfully elected.

=== People's Deputy of Ukraine ===
Pipa is a member of the Holos parliamentary faction and serves as secretary of the Verkhovna Rada Committee on Education, Science and Innovation.

Among her projects are the development of a senior professional school, the promotion of the Ukrainian language in education, and the establishment of boundaries and protections for parks in Lviv.[11]

In June 2021, she announced her participation in the newly-formed Justice parliamentary group, citing her lack of confidence in Kira Rudyk.

In October 2024, Pipa was one of the initiators of Bill No. 12086, which proposes amendments to the Law of Ukraine "On Education" concerning the creation of a Ukrainian-language educational environment in educational institutions. The proposal would extend the use of Ukrainian throughout educational institutions, including during breaks and in canteens. According to Pipa, the bill would not impose penalties on students and would not make the Ukrainian-language requirement mandatory for schools teaching in national minority languages.
