= Andriy Sharaskin =

Ukrainian actor, military commander, and politician

- Андрій Шараськін
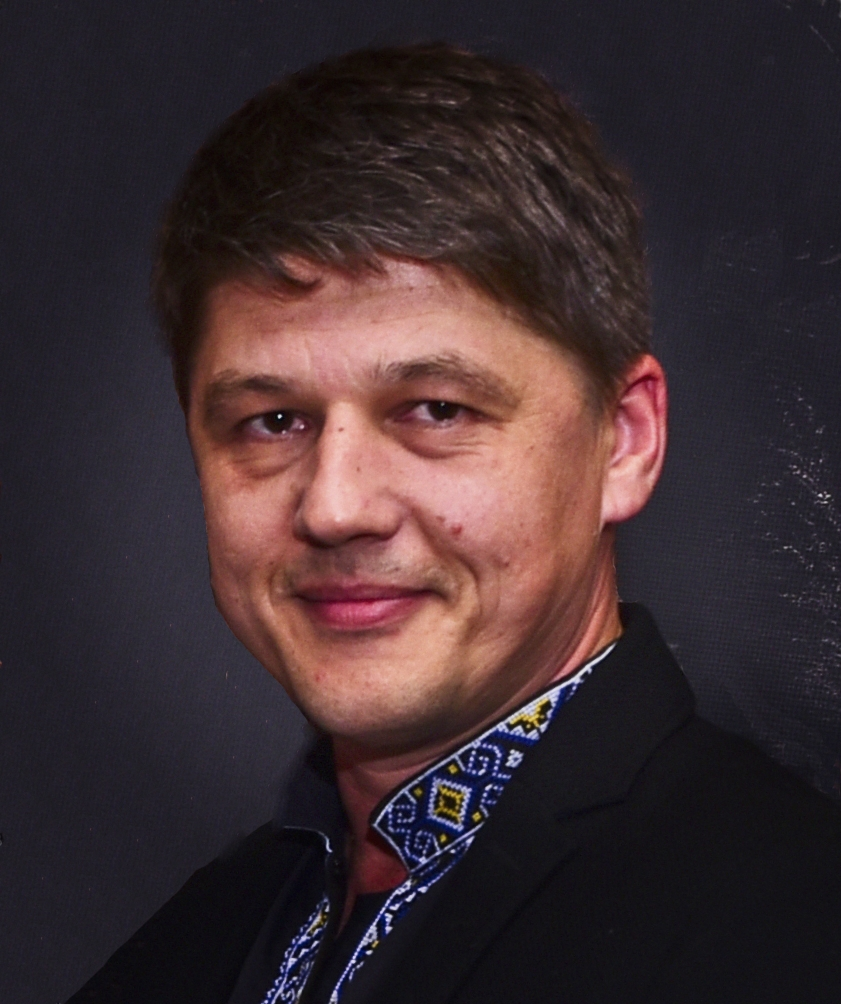
- Sharaskin in 2018

People's Deputy of Ukraine
- Incumbent
- Assumed office 6 November 2020
- Constituency: Holos, No. 20

Personal details
- Born: 20 September 1977 (age 49) Ternopil, Ukrainian SSR, Soviet Union (now Ukraine)
- Party: Holos
- Other political affiliations: Justice (since 2021); Right Sector
- Education: Kyiv National I. K. Karpenko-Kary Theatre, Cinema and Television University
- Nickname: Bohemia

Military service
- Allegiance: Ukraine
- Years of service: 2014–2016
- Unit: Ukrainian Volunteer Corps
- Battles/wars: Russo-Ukrainian War; War in Donbas; Second Battle of Donetsk Airport
- Awards: Order for Courage

Andriy Andriiovych Sharaskin (Ukrainian: Андрій Андрійович Шараськін; born 20 September 1977) is a Ukrainian actor, military commander, and politician currently serving as a People's Deputy of Ukraine from the proportional list of the Holos party since 2020. Prior to his election, he served in the war in Donbas, commanding Cyborgs from the Ukrainian Volunteer Corps during the Second Battle of Donetsk Airport.

== Early life and career ==
Andriy Andriiovych Sharaskin was born on 20 September 1977 in the western Ukrainian city of Ternopil, then part of the Soviet Union. Sharaskin is a graduate of the Kyiv National I. K. Karpenko-Kary Theatre, Cinema and Television University, and prior to 2013 he was an actor in several television films. Sharaskin founded a Lviv and Ternopil-based children's acting school in 2006, and he additionally directed a children's theatre in Lviv.

== Military career ==
Sharaskin was a participant in Euromaidan. Following the Revolution of Dignity and the beginning of the Russo-Ukrainian War he joined the far-right Right Sector as well as its paramilitary wing, the Ukrainian Volunteer Corps. He fought in the war in Donbas, and was one of the commanders of the Cyborgs during the Second Battle of Donetsk Airport, leading units of the Ukrainian Volunteer Corps. He fought under the military call sign of Bohemia. In recognition of his activities during the battle, he was awarded the Order for Courage third class.

After leaving combat in January 2016, Sharaskin served as a personal consultant to the 2017 film Cyborgs, with the central character being heavily based on Sharaskin. He had previously introduced screenwriter Nataliya Vorozhbyt to the Cyborgs during the war in Donbas.

== Political career ==
Sharaskin became leader of Right Sector in 2015. He additionally worked as deputy to Dmytro Yarosh after Yarosh left Right Sector to form the Government Initiative of Dmytro Yarosh. Sharaskin's activities in Right Sector were later noted on Russian state television channel Russia-1, where he was referred to as a Nazi and a puppet of the United States.

=== People's Deputy of Ukraine ===
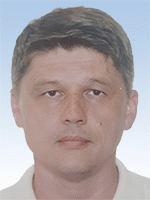
Official portrait as People's Deputy of Ukraine, 2020

During the 2019 Ukrainian parliamentary election Sharaskin was the 20th candidate on the proportional list of the liberal Holos party, having previously been introduced to the party by personal friend and fellow Cyborg Roman Kostenko. As Holos won only 17 proportional-list seats during the election, Sharaskin was not originally elected to the Verkhovna Rada (Ukraine's parliament). After Holos leader Sviatoslav Vakarchuk chose to resign in June 2020, however, Sharaskin was brought into the Verkhovna Rada to fill the seat vacated by Vakarchuk.

Following his appointment to the Verkhovna Rada, Sharaskin became secretary of the Verkhovna Rada Foreign Affairs and Interparliamentary Cooperation Committee. In June 2021, along with 9 other People's Deputies from Holos, Sharaskin established the Justice parliamentary group in protest of Kira Rudik's leadership of the party.

During the COVID-19 pandemic, Sharaskin claimed that the government of China had demanded Ukraine remove its signature from United Nations Human Rights Council statements calling for an independent investigation into the persecution of Uyghurs in China. According to Sharaskin, the Chinese government threatened to cease delivering COVID-19 vaccines if Ukraine did not remove its signature from the statements.

Sharaskin has expressed opposition to violence against Ukraine's LGBT community, comparing his position towards the LGBT community to that of Pope Francis, and has condemned threats of violence against pride parades from Right Sector members. However, in the Verkhovna Rada he proposed an amendment to exclude sexual orientation and gender identity from recognised forms of discrimination in media. Sharaskin's amendment, which ran counter to the position of other Holos members such as Inna Sovsun, was unsuccessful. He additionally voted against the ratification of the Istanbul Convention.

== Personal life ==
Sharaskin is a Christian. He has one daughter, and briefly lived in poverty while raising her from 2005 to 2006. It is unknown if he is married.
