= Volodymyr Tsabal =

Ukrainian economist and politician

- Володимир Цабаль
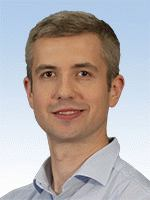
- Official portrait, 2019

People's Deputy of Ukraine
- Incumbent
- Assumed office 29 August 2019
- Constituency: Holos, No. 12

Personal details
- Born: 25 April 1985 (age 41) Kremenets, Ukrainian SSR, Soviet Union (now Ukraine)
- Party: Holos
- Other political affiliations: Justice
- Education: National University of Kyiv-Mohyla Academy; INSEAD (MBA)

Volodymyr Volodymyrovych Tsabal (Ukrainian: Володимир Володимирович Цабаль; born 25 April 1985) is a Ukrainian economist and politician currently serving as a People's Deputy of Ukraine on the proportional list of the Holos party since 2019. Prior to his election, he was an economic analyst working in the private sector.

== Early life and career ==
Volodymyr Volodymyrovych Tsabal was born on 25 April 1985 in the city of Kremenets, in the north of Ukraine's western Ternopil Oblast. He is a graduate of the National University of Kyiv-Mohyla Academy with a specialisation in economic theory, and received a Master of Business Administration at INSEAD after completing studies at the university's Singapore campus.

Tsabal's professional career began in 2005, when he became a data analyst at Tetra Pak's Ukrainian headquarters. The next year, he joined Nestlé Ukraine as a business analyst, moving to Athens in 2007 to become an analyst at Nestlé Greece. He also later became director of Nestlé in Bulgaria. From 2008 until his 2019 election he was a partner at McKinsey & Company, a global management consulting firm.

== Political career ==
Tsabal was the 12th candidate on the proportional list of the Holos party in the 2019 Ukrainian parliamentary election. At the time of the election, he was a member of the party. He was successfully elected, and took office as a People's Deputy of Ukraine in August of the same year. In the Verkhovna Rada (Ukraine's parliament), Tsabal has expressed positions such as support for the removal of Arsen Avakov as Minister of Internal Affairs and the removal of government officials who were affiliated with pro-Russian parties before the Russian invasion of Ukraine in 2022. Non-governmental organisation Chesno reported in 2020 that Tsabal has proposed more amendments to bills than any other Holos lawmaker, noting in particular his involvement in amending legislation regarding the Accounting Chamber and changes to the 2020 state budget.

Tsabal left Holos on 29 July 2021, citing Kira Rudik's takeover of the party. He had previously co-founded the Justice parliamentary group.

== Personal life ==
Tsabal is a member of the Eastern Orthodox Church. He has not publicly disclosed his marital status, or whether he has any children.
