= Dmytro Dobrodomov =

Ukrainian politician

- Дмитрий Добродомов
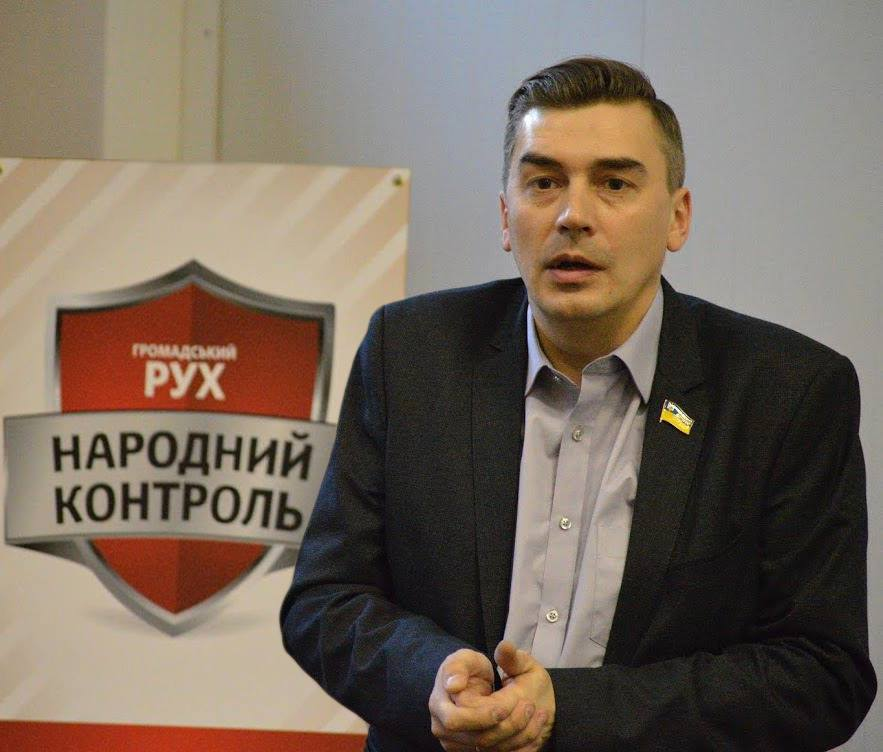

People's Deputy of Ukraine
- In office 27 November 2014 – 29 August 2019
- Preceded by: Mykhailo Khmil
- Succeeded by: Natalya Pipa
- Constituency: Lviv Oblast, No. 115

Personal details
- Born: 13 January 1977 (age 49) Lviv, Ukrainian SSR, Soviet Union (now Ukraine)
- Party: People's Control
- Education: University of Lviv

Dmytro Yevhenovych Dobrodomov (Ukrainian: Дмитро Євгенович Добродомов; born 13 January 1977) is a Ukrainian politician who served as a People's Deputy of Ukraine representing Ukraine's 115th electoral district from 2014 to 2019. He is the leader of the political party People's Control. Dobrodomov was a presidential candidate in 2019 Ukrainian presidential election. He withdrew from the election on 7 March 2019 in favour of Anatoliy Hrytsenko.

Dobrodomov hosts his own political talk show on Channel 4 in Ukraine.

== Early life and education ==
Dobrodomov was born on 13 January 1977 in Lviv, then part of the Ukrainian Soviet Socialist Republic of the Soviet Union.

Dobrodomov received his education at a technical school. Dobrodomov received his journalism degree from the Faculty of Postgraduate Studies at the University of Lviv.

== Career ==
=== Journalism and television ===
==== Early career ====
In 1998, despite his lack of formal training, he was hired as a journalist for the Ukrainian political newspaper Expres after visiting their editorial board. Between 1998 and 2002, Dobrodomov worked in Lviv as a journalist for the Express. He became an operative editor in 2002 and the First Deputy Strategic Editor of the newspaper in 2008. By 2008, Dobrodomov was the deputy editor-in-chief of the Express.

==== Journalistic Investigation Agency ====
In 2008, Dobrodomov founded the Journalistic Investigation Agency as the editor-in-chief. The agency aimed to use journalism to solve acute social problems beyond simply providing information or entertainment. The Journalistic Investigation Agency's main publication was the Informator newspaper, which quickly gained popularity among the citizens of Lviv. The publication focused on investigative journalism, solving the problems of readers, revealing corruption schemes, and punishing perpetrators. For several years, the work of journalists and editors was recognized by the professional jury of the "Honor of the Profession" contest. The design of the Informator thrice received a prestigious award at an international competition held in Moscow.

==== ZIK channel ====
On 1 September 2010, Dobrodomov created a new regional TV channel. He expanded his own professional work space and became the general producer of the TV and radio company MIST TB, which eventually aired under the logo of the ZIK channel. Dobrodomov created and authored a program of journalistic investigations titled Who lives here?, which aimed to reveal the real wealth and corrupt actions of officials and representatives of all levels in the government of Ukraine. During its two-year run, the program's subjects included deputies, judges, policemen, governors, and officials. After the programs fell under the scrutiny of law enforcement agencies, several subjects lost their positions or were even imprisoned.

In 2010, Dobrodomov became the general producer of the ZIK channel. In 2012, he became the Director General of ZIK. Under the leadership of Dobrodomov, the ZIK channel, which started as a local media station, became the most popular regional TV channel for four years. In 2013, Dobrodomov launched a new program of journalistic investigations titled People's Control. Its slogan repeated Article 5 of the Constitution of Ukraine: "The only source of power in Ukraine is the people." Over time, the program became a public-journalist movement, which is active in civic activities in Lviv and its surrounding region. The show contributed to the control of local authorities through increasing the public's scrutiny of their promises and actions. People's Control became one of the organizers of the center for providing troops, which engaged in delivering assistance to soldiers in the War in Donbas.

=== Politics ===
In 2000, Dobrodomov was a member of the all-Ukrainian Public Committee of Resistance, For the Truth!. In the early 2000s, he was an activist in public movements including "Ukraine without Kuchma" and "The Wave of Freedom". His first attempt to get elected in parliament was in the 2002 Ukrainian parliamentary election in Lviv's 116 constituency. But he was not elected. In the 2012 Ukrainian parliamentary election Dobrodomov unsuccessfully tried to win a seat in the Verkhovna Rada (the parliament of Ukraine) in the 115th Sykhiv constituency in Lviv. He was nominated by Ukrainian politician Vitali Klitschko's political party, the Ukrainian Democratic Alliance for Reform.

Dobrodomov is a member of the public organization Independent Association of Journalists-Investigators and a co-founder of nongovernmental organization, Civic Initiative People's Control. In the 2014 Ukrainian parliamentary election he was elected parliamentary deputy in the 115th constituency with support of the Petro Poroshenko Bloc (PPB). But after the election he soon left the PPB parliamentary faction. He was a member of the Interfactional Union "Eurooptimists".

In the 2015 Ukrainian local elections Dobrodomov unsuccessfully ran for Mayor of Lviv. He came third with 10.74% of the votes.

Dobrodomov was a presidential candidate in 2019 Ukrainian presidential election. He withdrew from the election on 7 March 2019 in favour of Anatoliy Hrytsenko. In these election Hrytsenko did not proceed to the second round of the election; in the first round he placed fifth with 6.91% of the votes.

In the 2019 Ukrainian parliamentary election, Dobrodomov was placed fifth in the top ten of the party list of the political party Civil Position. But they party gained 1.04% of the national vote and no parliamentary seats.

== Nominations and awards ==
In 2011, Dobrodomov, as the author and presenter of the journalist investigation program Who lives here?, won first in the professional journalism competition "Honor of the profession" and was nominated for the Ukrainian television award Teletriumph.

In 2012, Dobrodomov's Who lives here? was the winner of the "Leader of any format - the region" category in Teletriumph.

== Personal life ==
Dobrodomov is married. His second and current wife is Anna Malkina, who is a philosophy professor in Kyiv National University. Dobrodomov has two children, a daughter and a son, from his previous marriage.
