= Yaroslav Yurchyshyn =

Ukrainian politician

- Ярослав Юрчишин
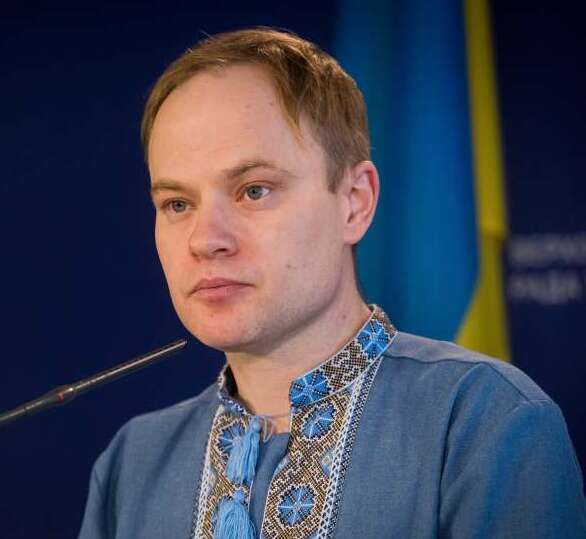
- Yurchyshyn in 2023

People's Deputy of Ukraine
- Incumbent
- Assumed office 29 August 2019
- Constituency: Holos, No. 7

Personal details
- Born: 14 October 1980 (age 45) Mirny, Arkhangelsk Oblast, Russian SFSR, Soviet Union (now Russia)
- Party: Holos
- Other political affiliations: Justice; Democratic Alliance; Our Ukraine (2005–2010s)
- Education: University of Lviv; National University of Kyiv-Mohyla Academy

Yaroslav Romanovych Yurchyshyn (Ukrainian: Ярослав Романович Юрчишин; born 14 October 1980) is a Ukrainian politician and anti-corruption activist currently serving as a People's Deputy of Ukraine from the proportional list of the Holos party since 2019. Prior to his election, he was executive director of Transparency International Ukraine and a member of the National Anti-Corruption Bureau of Ukraine.

== Early life and career ==
Yaroslav Romanovych Yurchyshyn was born on 14 October 1980 in the village of Mirny, in the northern Russian Soviet Federative Socialist Republic. He joined Plast in 2001 and graduated from the University of Lviv with a degree in archaeology a year later. Yurchyshyn also graduated from National University of Kyiv-Mohyla Academy with a specialty in political sciences and a certificate in practical psychology.

From 2003 to 2005 Yurchyshyn was head of the Kyiv office of Plast. He joined the Phoenix Capital investment bank in 2009 and was responsible for overseeing the bank's relations with the Ukrainian government. Yurchyshyn worked at Phoenix Capital until 2011, when he joined the National Democratic Institute as a trainer in lobbying and media. He also worked with the Ukrainian Catholic University. He was also the chairman of Plast's congress from 2013 to 2014.

== Political career ==
Yurchyshyn joined politics during the Orange Revolution. He supported the Viktor Yushchenko-led opposition as part of the Clean Ukraine campaign. Following the revolution he joined the Our Ukraine party, remaining in the party until the 2010s. Yurchyshyn also protested against changes to the Ukrainian electoral code developed during the presidency of Viktor Yanukovych, and has referred to the 2012 Ukrainian parliamentary election as "falsified".

Following the Revolution of Dignity Yurchyshyn became an adviser to Andriy Parubiy in his capacity as Secretary of the National Security and Defense Council of Ukraine. He had previously been an adviser to Ihor Kril, Lesya Orobets, and Mykola Kniazhytskyi as People's Deputies of Ukraine, and later advised Parubiy as a People's Deputy. In 2014 Yurchyshyn also became leader of the Democratic Alliance party in Kyiv. He also became legal adviser for the Reanimation Reform Packet non-governmental organisation the same year.

Yurchyshyn became a member of the Civil Oversight Council of the National Anti-corruption Bureau of Ukraine, established to ensure the bureau's transparency, in 2014. He later served as member of a committee entrusted with selecting members of the Specialized Anti-Corruption Prosecutor's Office from 2016 to 2017. He was concurrently part of a commission for selecting the head of the National Agency on Corruption Prevention. From 2016 to 2018 Yurchyshyn was director of Transparency International Ukraine. He subsequently became chairman of the group, resigning in 2019.

In May 2019 Yurchyshyn co-founded the Holos party. In the 2019 Ukrainian parliamentary election Yurchyshyn was the 7th candidate on the proportional list of Holos. He was successfully elected into the Verkhovna Rada (Ukraine's parliament), and inaugurated on 29 August 2019.

=== People's Deputy of Ukraine ===
Yurchyshyn joined the Justice parliamentary group in 2021, joining other members of Holos who split from the party faction in the Verkhovna Rada over a leadership dispute. He voted in favour of the removal of Arsen Avakov as Minister of Internal Affairs, and called for the removal of all members of pro-Russian parties from the Verkhovna Rada following the 2022 Russian invasion of Ukraine.

Following his election as People's Deputy of Ukraine Yurchyshyn became first deputy chairman of the Verkhovna Rada Anti-Corruption Committee. In this role Yurchyshyn was among the leaders of attempts to reinstitute the e-declaration system amidst martial law during the Russian invasion of Ukraine.

Yurchyshyn was appointed as head of the Verkhovna Rada Freedom of Speech Committee on 9 December 2023, after Nestor Shufrych was removed from office on 20 September as a result of charges of high treason being levelled against him by Pecherskyi District Court.

Yurchyshyn has also expressed support for what he has referred to as the "decolonisation" and "controlled collapse" of Russia, particularly supporting independence for nations in the North Caucasus and Tatarstan. He has compared the Soviet empire and Russia under Vladimir Putin to the British, French, and Spanish empires.

== Personal life ==
Yurchyshyn is a member of the Ukrainian Greek Catholic Church. He is married, with a daughter and two sons.
