= Mykhailo Khmil =

Ukrainian politician

- Михайло Хміль
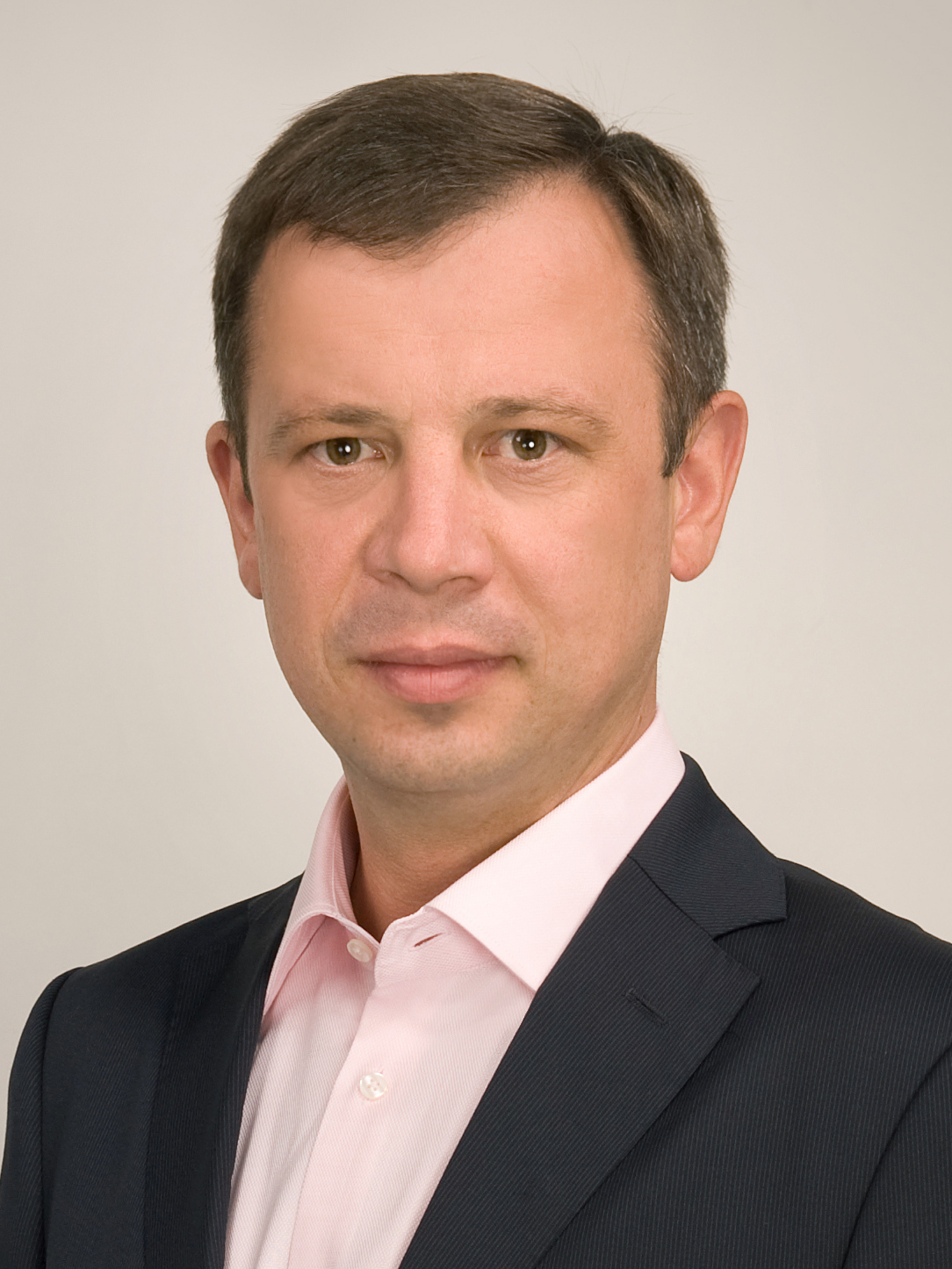

Personal details
- Born: 11 May 1973 (age 52) Village Briukhovychi, Peremyshliany Raion, Lviv Oblast, Ukraine
- Party: People's Front (Ukraine)

Mykhailo Mykhailovych Khmil (Ukrainian: Михайло Михайлович Хміль, born 11 May 1973) is a Ukrainian political activist. He is a People's Deputy of Ukraine 7th and 8th convocations.

== Education ==
1995 — Ivan Franko National University of Lviv, Economic Faculty, specialty – sociology. In 1995—1998 — a post-graduate student of Lviv University. In 2000—2002 — doctorate of Ukrainian Free University (Minich), Germany. Got a degree of Doctor of Economics in Ukrainian Free University (UFU).

== Career ==
- 1996—1998 — chairman of sociological laboratory of Lviv University.
- 1999—2000 — assistant-consultant of the Ukrainian’ people’s deputy Viktor Pynzenyk.
- May–December 2002 — completed training courses at the German Company Direct-online (Minich).
- 2004—2005 — Head of Secretariate of Social Organization «Lviv Entrepreneurs’ Committee».
- 2005—2012 — director of Lviv Oblast employment center.
- 2010—2012 — Lviv City Council Deputy from party «Front for Change».

He was elected people’s deputy of Ukraine at the Parliament Elections in 2012 according to a single-seat majoritarian election region № 115. The Head of the Committee on the questions of wages, indexation and compensation of citizens’ income and collective agreement-based regulation of social-labour relations of the Verhovna Rada Committee on the questions of social politic and labour. At off-year Parliamentary Elections in 2014 he ran for in accordance with the list of Political Party People's Front (Ukraine). Since 27 November 2014, he has been the people’s deputy of Ukraine of the 8th convocation. A member of deputy’s faction of Political Party "People’s Front". A secretary of the Verkhovna Rada Committee on the issues of industrial policy and entrepreneurship.

In the 2019 Ukrainian parliamentary election Khmil failed as an independent candidate in constituency 115 (in Lviv Oblast) to get reelected to parliament. He lost this election with 2.53% of the votes to Natalia Pipa of the party Voice (who won with 30,02% of the votes).
