= Radina =

Radina is a surname, the feminine form of "Radin", and a feminine given name. Notable people with the name include:

== Surname ==
- Anastasiya Radina (born 1984), Ukrainian politician
- Natalya Radina (born 1979), Belarusian journalist

== Given name ==
- Radina Borshosh (born 1997), Bulgarian actress
- Radina Tomova (born 2005), Bulgarian rhythmic gymnast
- Radina Velichkova
