= Roman Kostenko =

Ukrainian military commander and politician (born 1983)

- Роман Костенко
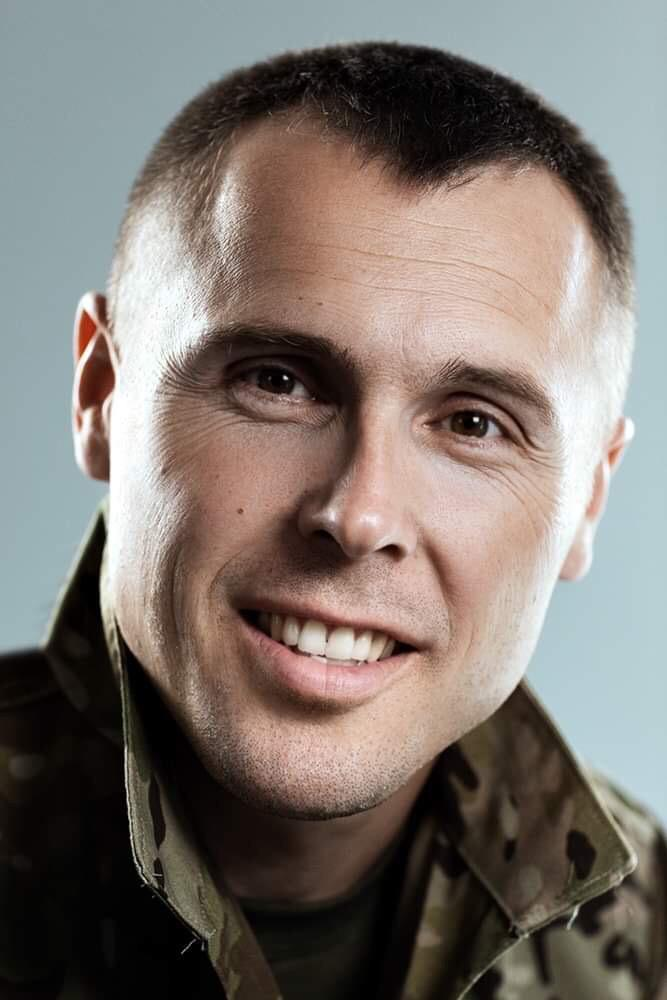
- Kostenko in 2022

People's Deputy of Ukraine
- Incumbent
- Assumed office 29 August 2019
- Constituency: Holos, No. 14

Personal details
- Born: 21 October 1983 (age 42) Kherson, Ukrainian SSR, Soviet Union (now Kherson, Ukraine)
- Party: Independent
- Other political affiliations: Holos
- Education: Odesa Military Academy; National Academy for Public Administration
- Nickname: Thunder

Military service
- Allegiance: Ukraine
- Branch/service: Ukrainian Ground Forces; Security Service of Ukraine
- Years of service: 2000–present
- Rank: Colonel
- Unit: 79th Air Assault Brigade; Alpha Group
- Battles/wars: Russo-Ukrainian War; War in Donbas; Second Battle of Donetsk Airport; 2022 Russian invasion of Ukraine; Battle of Mykolaiv; 2022 Ukrainian southern counteroffensive
- Awards: Order of Bohdan Khmelnytsky 3d class

Roman Vasyliovych Kostenko (Ukrainian: Роман Васильович Костенко; born 21 October 1983) is a Ukrainian military commander and politician currently serving as a People's Deputy of Ukraine from the Holos party list since 29 August 2019. A member of the Cyborgs, Kostenko fought at the Second Battle of Donetsk Airport during the war in Donbas, for which he was awarded the Order of Bohdan Khmelnytsky, as well as the 2022 Russian invasion of Ukraine. He is a secretary of the Parliamentary Committee on National Security, Defense, and Intelligence. His military call sign is "Thunder" (Ukrainian: Гром, romanized: Hrom).

== Early life and career ==
Roman Kostenko was born in Kherson on 21 October 1983, in what was then the Ukrainian Soviet Socialist Republic of the Soviet Union. He was educated in the city of Mykolaiv, and later graduated from the Odesa Military Academy in 2005, spending ten years of his life in the latter city. Kostenko has described Southern Ukraine as his native land, and stated that he returned to military service during the Russian invasion of Ukraine in order to protect the region.

Kostenko has stated that he had a desire to join the military from a young age, and has noted that this was despite the fact that none of his family members other than his great-grandfather had previously served in military roles. At the age of 16, he decided to join the Odesa Military Academy, after also considering Sumy High Artillery Command School and Ivan Bohun Military High School.

== Military career ==
Kostenko's military career began in 2000. He originally served in the 79th Air Assault Brigade, at first as a platoon commander, and later as a company commander. In 2008, Kostenko moved from the 79th Air Assault Brigade to the Alpha Group, within the Security Service of Ukraine, in spite of his parents' protests and the lower pay.

=== War in Donbas (2014–2022) ===
During the early stages of the war in Donbas, Kostenko chose to fight the separatist forces of the Donetsk People's Republic, using vacation days he had saved up to go to the front with the 79th Air Assault Brigade, his former unit. In 2022, Kostenko said that he had joined the war "to restore justice", also saying:

When I was at Donetsk Airport for the first time, I was afraid that if I died, my family would not receive payments. I told everyone that I was going on vacation, and I took a machine gun and went to the front, because my unit was there - the 79th brigade, in which I served, and the "Alfa" [Group].

Kostenko was part of the group of Ukrainian soldiers known as "Cyborgs" for their defence of Donetsk International Airport during the Second Battle of Donetsk Airport. For this, he was awarded the Order of Bohdan Khmelnytsky in 2014. Kostenko noted that many of the Cyborgs were not professional soldiers. He additionally criticised the attitude of some soldiers who did not fight at Donetsk Airport for that reason, saying, "Look, people don't know anything. Only that this is their land. They take a machine gun, and go and protect it. These people were the most motivated. When you see that you have such soldiers, there's no fear."

Kostenko continued to serve in active duty until May 2019, retiring from active duty due to his election to the Verkhovna Rada (Ukraine's parliament).

=== 2022 Russian invasion of Ukraine ===
In 2022, immediately following Russia's invasion of Ukraine, Kostenko returned to active duty, travelling south to fight Russian soldiers attacking the city of Mykolaiv. Kostenko worked with Dmytro Marchenko to formulate the ultimately-successful plan to defend the city. Kostenko led an ad-hoc special forces group that destroyed the bridges over irrigation channels around the city, helping to halt the Russian advance.

Kostenko has been regarded as one of the most significant Ukrainian military commanders of the invasion, being listed by influential magazine NV as among the top 25 commanders due to his role in the Southern Ukraine campaign. On August 12, 2024, Kostenko posted a video where he stood at a border checkpoint, with the sign "Russia" visible behind him. In the video, he humorously stated that he had entered the Kursk Region of the Russian Federation without a business trip, promising Verkhovna Rada Speaker Ruslan Stefanchuk that he would issue one later.

=== Awards ===
Order of Bohdan Khmelnytsky 3d class.

== Political career ==
Before his decision to run in the 2019 Ukrainian parliamentary election, Kostenko was close to multiple members of the Ukrainian political party Holos, particularly television presenter Serhiy Prytula and fellow Cyborg Andriy Sharaskin, who ultimately recruited him to join the party.

=== 2019 Ukrainian parliamentary election ===
In July 2019, in a 2019 interview to the Tsensor.NET website, Kostenko announced he was joining the Holos party, campaigning on a policy of bringing an end to the Russo-Ukrainian War and making Ukraine a "successful and comfortable country for life." He additionally cited the lack of victory in the war as the justification for his joining politics, and refused to rule out the possibility of becoming Minister of Defense. He additionally criticised the political establishment and welcomed anti-establishment figures as a break from what he referred to as the "political elite."

Kostenko was placed 14th on the party list of Holos during the election, and was ultimately elected into the Verkhovna Rada. Following his election, he became secretary of the Parliamentary Committee on National Security, Defense, and Intelligence.

In 2020, Kostenko graduated from the National Academy for Public Administration with a master's degree in public administration.

Kostenko was the author of the successful Draft Law on Amendments to the Law of Ukraine "On the Foundations of National Resistance," which expanded the scope of Territorial Defense Forces operations.
