= Yulia Sirko =

Ukrainian politician

- Юлія Сірко
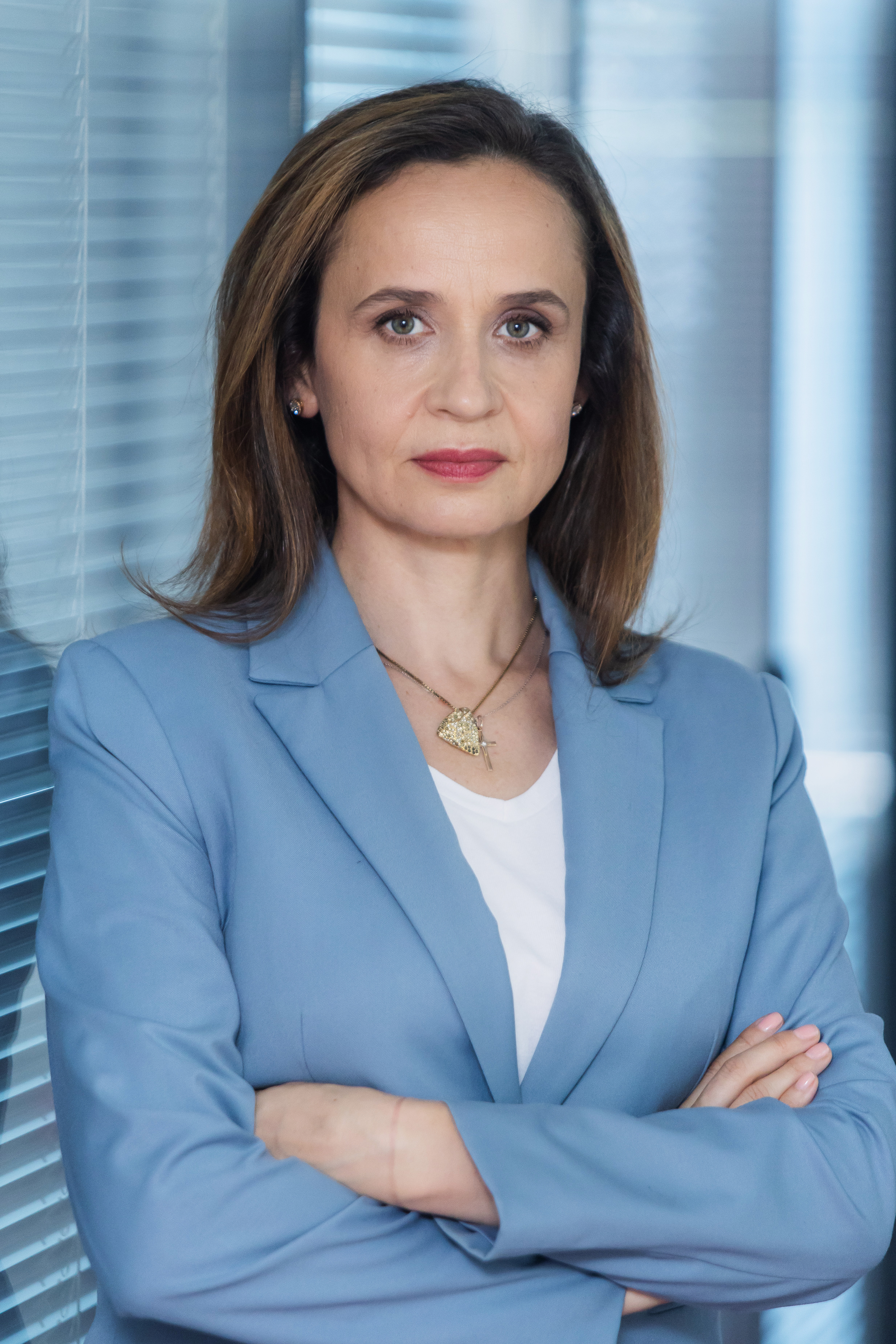

Member of the Verkhovna Rada
- Incumbent
- Assumed office 29 August 2019
- Constituency: Holos, No. 2

Personal details
- Born: 5 October 1976 (age 49) Kyiv, Ukrainian SSR
- Party: Holos
- Education: National University of Kyiv-Mohyla Academy; International Management Institute (MBA); Institute of Real Estate Management

Yulia Sirko (Ukrainian: Юлія Сірко; born 5 October 1976) is a Ukrainian politician, Member of Verkhovna Rada (Parliament of Ukraine) since 2019, vice-chair of the parliamentary Infrastructure and Transport Committee, Deputy head of Golos party faction, Secretary of the Ukrainian-Indian friendship group and co-chair of the parliamentary maritime group.

Sirko was the Head of the Golos party and the head of the Party's general election campaign in 2018-2019 that took the party to the Verkhovna Rada (Ukrainian Parliament) gaining over 20 seats in 400 local council members across Ukraine.

Sirko is a pro-European, pro-NATO, pro-business, pro-democracy and pro-reform politician fighting corruption, abuse of power, suppression of freedom of speech and information on all the levels of the state power. She mainly focuses on economic security and development, transport and the infrastructure sector as well as maritime security and economy.

Sirko is a member of the Economic Committee of Delegation to the Parliamentary Assembly of the Black Sea Economic Cooperation Organization, member of the groups for inter-parliamentary relations with Canada, United Kingdom, India, Romania and Germany.

Coming to Ukrainian politics after her tenure in the Government of Ukraine as Vice Deputy Minister-State Secretary of Economic Development and Trade (2015–2016) where Sirko was responsible for the small and medium business development, economic deregulation, implementation of the public administration reform in the Ministry, subordinated agencies and state owned enterprises reform.

Acting as the State Secretary Sirko established the deregulation office that reviewed over 10 thousand business-critical regulatory acts and removed over 100 legislative and regulatory barriers for business. During Yulia Sirko's tenure the BRDO was able to attract a large pool of young professional talent, many of whom continued to grow in their political careers including one prime minister of Ukraine, 5 ministers and 10 vice ministers of Ukrainian governments during 2019–2024.

Sirko is the author or co-author of over 220 draft bills in the economic and national security sectors, over 50 of which were successfully passed by Parliamentary Committees, voted by the Parliament and become part of the current legislation.

Prior to serving in the Verkhovna Rada, Yulia was a vice-president of the Kyiv School of Economics responsible for the business education and a board member in several NGOs and SOE e.g. Transparency International Ukraine, Centre for Economic Strategy/Ukraine and Ukrainian Sea Port Authority.

Before 2013–2014, Yulia Sirko was the CEO of a leading property development and management company with over US$100 million of investments under management developing 200,000 sqm of commercial real estate space in Ukraine.

== Biography ==
Born in Kyiv / Ukraine Yulia Sirko grew up with her father Leonid (leading engineer of acoustic deep water submarine systems development) and with her mother Nila (a mechanical engineer at military research center) and her older sister Svitlana - early education specialist who dedicated her life to teaching. The family was a member and active supporter of Narodnyi Rukh from the early days of Ukrainian independence and avid promoter of the Ukrainian culture and heritage.

Yulia Sirko graduated from high school in Kyiv with distinction and was accepted into a leading university with a four-hundred-year history Kyiv Mohyla Academy to study Economics and Political Science graduating in 1997. Continuing her education Yulia Sirko in 1999 completed a Swiss – Ukrainian MBA program with International Management Institute and in 2006 IREM Property Development & Management Program.
