= Victoria Voytsitska =

Ukrainian politician

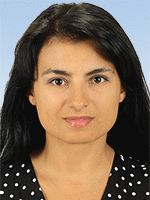
- In office 27 November 2014 – 24 July 2019

Personal details
- Born: 27 November 1974 (age 51) Kyiv
- Party: Samopomich Union
- Spouse: Voitsitskiy Gennadiy Yevgeniyovich
- Education: Kyiv National University of Trade and Economics
- Occupation: lawmaker

Victoria Mykhailivna Voytsitska (born 27 November 1974) is a Ukrainian politician, former Member of the Parliament of Ukraine of the 8th Convocation, member of the parliamentary faction Samopomich Union. She was the Secretary of the Committee on Fuel-Energy, Nuclear Policies and Security.

== Biography ==
Voytsitska was born in Kyiv. In 2002 she graduated from Kyiv National University of Trade and Economics, where she attained the specialist degree in banking. In 2005 she graduated Brandeis International Business School with Master of Business Administration degree in international finance.

Her working experience includes the position of auditor in PricewaterhouseCoopers (1994–1997), financial controller in ING Barings Ukraine (1997–1999), financial controller in the Black Sea Trade and Development Bank in Thessaloniki, Greece (1999–2001).

In 2003–2005 along with studying in Brandeis International Business School, she was the Fundraising Events Coordinator at Harvard University.

In 2005–2007 she was the corporate finance director in Concorde Capital. In 2007–2009 worked as a capital market director in Cushman&Wakefield Ukraine.

In 2009–2011 she retained the position of corporate finance director in Adamant Investments. In 2011 and until April 2014 she was the financial director of TYSAGas, CUB Energy Inc., VP Finance.

She was an independent observer for the 2014 Presidential elections in Ukraine, representing the civic organisation OPORA.

In the 2014 Ukrainian parliamentary election Voytsitska was (as a non-partisan candidate) number 22 on the election list of Samopomich Union. She was elected into the Parliament of Ukraine.

Voytsitska is known for her anti-oligarch stance, having opposed the strengthening of the oligarchs in economy, especially regarding oil and gas trade and supply. As a member of the Committee on Fuel-Energy, Nuclear Policies and Security, she insisted on audit of Ukrnafta, Ukrainian oil trade company, and review of the divident payments, made to the state budget.

Voytsitska hosts her own political talk show on "24 Channel".

Voytsitska took part in the July 2019 Ukrainian parliamentary election in electoral district 155, Rivne Oblast, for the party Voice. But lost her parliamentary seat in the election. In district 155 (centred in Dubrovytsia) she took fourth place with 5.63% of the votes.

Victoria Voytsitska is married and has a daughter.
