= Olena Moshenets =

Ukrainian politician (born 1983)

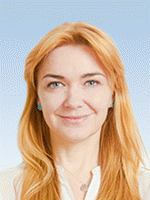
Olena Moshenets

Olena Volodymyrivna Moshenets (born March 6, 1983) is a Ukrainian journalist, public and political figure, editor-in-chief of "TOP-100. Ratings of the largest" magazine. People's Deputy of Ukraine of the IX convocation.

== Early life and education ==
Olena Moshenets was born on March 6, 1983, in Kyiv. In 1997–2000, she studied at the Ukrainian Humanities Lyceum with a specialization in economics, which she completed with honors.

Moshenets received her first higher education in Economic Theory at Taras Shevchenko National University of Kyiv, graduating with honors in 2006, earning a master's degree in economics. She obtained her second higher education at the Academy of Public Administration (2002–2007) with a specialization in Jurisprudence, becoming a lawyer. She obtained a master's degree in Public Administration from Taras Shevchenko National University of Kyiv with honors in 2021. In 2020, she completed her training at the Diplomatic Academy of Ukraine named after Hennadiy Udovenko under the Ministry of Foreign Affairs studying Regional Aspects of Ukraine's Foreign Policy. She also studied at the Ukrainian Legislative School of the Verkhovna Rada of Ukraine and received certificates in Current Issues of Legislative Process and Current Issues in Public Administration, as well as certificates in International Humanitarian Law and training in Dialogue Tools in Effective Communication as part of projects implemented by the OSCE in Ukraine.

Moshenets also attended the Digital Journalism School (DFJ – Digital Future of Journalism) of Kyiv-Mohyla Academy and completed internships at major US publishers like The Washington Post, BuzzFeed, Thomson Reuters, National Geographic.

== Career ==
Olena Moshenets started her journalistic career at the "Economics" publishing house in 2006 at the business weekly publication "InvestGazeta", where she progressed from a reviewer to a department editor. She specialized in financial topics such as the banking market, the stock market, non-banking financial services market, and conducted a series of interviews with top financial institutions.

In 2013, she was named the best journalist of Ukraine in the category "Banks. Money. Investments" by PRESSZVANIE.

She has held positions as chief editor of the business/media bureau ekonomika+, editor-in-chief of the rating publication "Top-100. Ratings of the largest", deputy editor-in-chief of the informational portal delo.ua, head of special projects at the newspaper "Kapital", and deputy editor of the magazine "Business" at "Blitz-Inform" publishing house.

=== Political Activity ===
Olena Moshenets is a Member of the Verkhovna Rada of Ukraine from the "Servant of the People" party, elected in the parliamentary elections of 2019, No. 56 on the list.

Deputy Chair of the Committee on Anti-Corruption Policy in the Verkhovna Rada of Ukraine of the IX convocation (since August 29, 2019). Member of the executive committee of the National Parliamentary Group in the Inter-parliamentary Union.

Deputy Member of the Ukrainian part of the Parliamentary Association Committee Ukraine-EU.

Deputy Member of the Permanent Delegation to the Parliamentary Assembly of the Council of Europe.

Co-chair of the Inter-Parliamentary Relations Group with Monaco.

Deputy Co-chair of the Inter-Parliamentary Relations Group with China.

Secretary of the Inter-Parliamentary Relations Group with Malaysia.

Secretary of the Inter-Parliamentary Relations Group with the United Arab Emirates.

Member of the Inter-Parliamentary Relations Group with the United States.

Member of the Inter-Parliamentary Relations Group with Cyprus.

Member of the Inter-Parliamentary Relations Group with the United Kingdom.

In 2021, Moshenets joined the women's wing of the "Servant of the People" party - the "Ze! Women" movement and became a mentor for the Mykolaiv region within the "Ze! Women" movement.

== Works ==
Olena Moshenets has a number of scientific publications on the topic of rent-oriented economic behavior in the context of public choice theory, such as "Institutional Traps as a Condition for the Emergence of Rent-Oriented Economic Behavior in Ukraine", "Analysis of State 'Failures' in the Context of Public Choice Implementation in Ukraine", "Evolution of Rent Relations: from the Classical School to Public Choice Theory", "Features of the Interconnection of Lobbying, Logrolling, and Corruption Institutions in the Economy of Ukraine" and more.
