= Roksolana Pidlasa =

Ukrainian politician and economist

- Роксолана Підласа
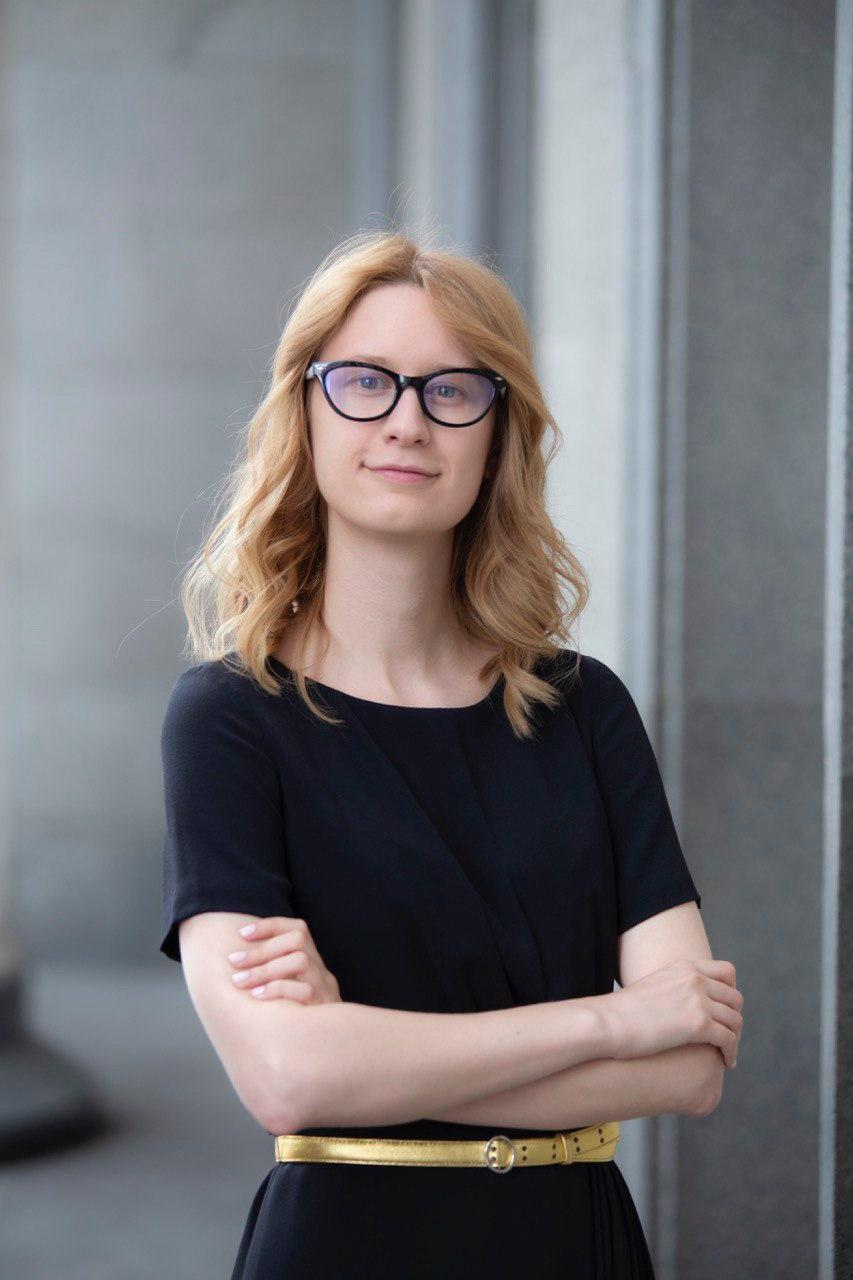

Member of the Verkhovna Rada
- Incumbent
- Assumed office 29 August 2019

Personal details
- Born: Roksolana Andriivna Pidlasa; 25 January 1994 (age 32) Cherkasy, Ukraine
- Party: Servant of the People

Roksolana Andriivna Pidlasa (Ukrainian: Роксолана Андріївна Підласа; born on 25 January 1994) is a Ukrainian politician and economist, and the chairman of the budget committee of the Verkhovna Rada.

She launched the National Program of Internships in Central Executive Authorities.

On 21 July 2019, Pidlasa was elected to the people's deputies in the parliamentary elections on the list of the "Servant of the People" party (no. 100 on the list). She was the former deputy head of the committee on economic development in the Verkhovna Rada of the 9th convocation from 2019 to 2022.

== Biography ==
Pidlasa was born Cherkasy on 25 January 1994, and graduated from Kyiv University of Economics named after Hetman in the specialty of international economy. She received her second higher education at the Kyiv School of Economics, majoring in public policy and governance.

Between 2011 and 2014, she was a member of the youth NGO European Youth Parliament - Ukraine.

She was responsible for representing the organization in the international arena and preparing EMP-Ukraine delegations for international sessions of the European Youth Parliament. In 2012, Pidlasa was the main organizer of a series of regional EMP conferences in 15 cities in Ukraine.

The conferences aimed to involve young people in the discussion of the most pressing problems of Ukraine and the EU, as well as in democratic debates following the example of the European Parliament.

Pidlasa took part in more than 30 conferences of the European Youth Parliament in Ukraine, Kosovo, Latvia, Germany, Portugal, Serbia, Finland, and France. She acted as a delegate, later as a committee chair and was elected vice-president for international relations in 2014.

The same year, she interned at the representation of the European Union in Ukraine. From 2014 to 2015, she worked at the American Chamber of Commerce in Ukraine. From 2015 to 2016, she was a project manager of the Ukrainian Crisis Media Center, where she specialized in the communication of energy sector reforms.

In 2015, she was a participant in the International Visitor Leadership Program of the US State Department in the direction of strategic communications.

In March 2016, she has worked at the Ministry of Economic Development and Trade as an independent consultant and head of the communications team (since April 2016).

In December 2017, she was appointed to the position of adviser to the minister on public grounds.

From 2016 to 2018, Pidlasa was responsible for coordinating the public activities of the Ministry of Economic Development and Trade of Ukraine, interaction with mass media. She managed the Ministry's communications team.

In December 2018, she served as the spokesperson of the Ministry of Economic Development and Trade of Ukraine.

In 2018, Pidlasa initiated the launch of the National Internship Program in central executive bodies. She also held the position of secretary of the coordination committee of the National Internship Program in the central bodies of executive power. та здійснювала загальне керівництво Програмою.

Pidlasa was a candidate for people's deputies from the Servant of the People party in the 2019 parliamentary elections, no. 104 on the list. At the time of the elections: she was an advisor to the Minister of Economic Development and Trade, and is an independent. She lived in Kyiv at the time.

In the position of deputy head of the committee on economic development, she dealt with issues of privatization, public procurement, antimonopoly reform, legislation in the field of intellectual property.

According to the analysis of the CHESNO movement, during the year of the parliament's 9 convocations, Pidlasa's bills were adopted quite often. In 2020, 30 out of 77 initiatives submitted by Podlasa became laws. Also, most of the amendments submitted by her are usually taken into account.

In May 2022, Pidlasa spoke at the World Economic Forum in Davos with a call to unblock Ukrainian seaports and resume exports of agricultural products from Ukraine.

On 1 November 2022, she initiated the denunciation of Commonwealth of Independent States Free Trade Area, stating, "It is time to decolonize our trade. We have bilateral free trade agreements with all CIS member countries, the GUAM Free Trade Agreement, and we also apply the Pan-Euro-Med regional convention with Georgia and Moldova. There are many tools that work for Ukrainian manufacturers. There is no need to participate in a treaty where Russia imposes its rules and uses the right of force.".

On 13 December 2022, the Verkhovna Rada elected Pidlasa as the head of the budget committee.

After the Russian invasion of Ukraine, she was involved in volunteer activities, where she organized a logistics hub that delivered almost 600 tons of humanitarian aid from EU countries to Ukraine.

== Personal life ==
In addition to Ukrainian, she is fluent in English and Russian.
