= Ukrainian Galician Party =

Ukrainian Galician Party Українська Галицька партія
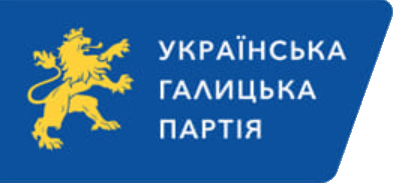
- Founded: August 18, 2014
- Headquarters: Lviv, Ukraine
- Newspaper: Our Galicia
- Membership: 1,000
- Ideology: Christian democracy Pro-Europeanism; Ukrainian nationalism
- Colors: Blue and gold
- Verkhovna Rada: 0 / 450
- Lviv Oblast Council: 6 / 84
- Ivano-Frankivsk Oblast Council: 0 / 84
- Ternopil Oblast Council: 0 / 64
- Regions: 219 / 43,122

Symbol
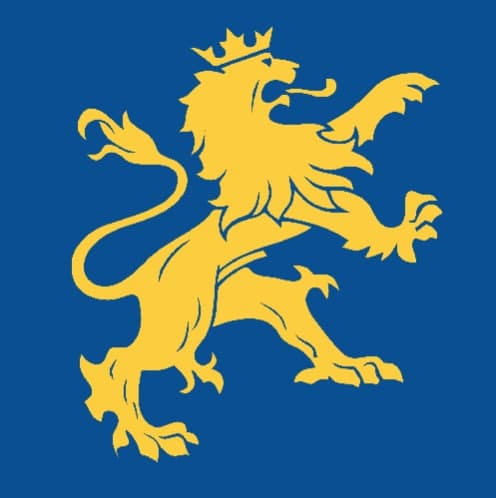

Website
- uhp.org.ua

The Ukrainian Galician Party (Ukrainian: Українська Галицька партія, romanized: Ukrayins'ka Halyts'ka partiya) or UGP (Ukrainian: УГП) is a Christian democratic political party active in the western Ukrainian region of Galicia, which consists of Lviv, Ivano-Frankivsk, and Ternopil oblasts. It was registered in the aftermath of the Revolution of Dignity in 2014 to pursue the implementation of Euromaidan's original goals, and became politically active in 2015.

== Ideology ==
Since 2018, the Ukrainian Galician Party has used the slogan "God - Man - Ukraine" to represent the main tenets of their ideology: Christian democracy, Ukrainian nationalism, and pro-Europeanism.

The party supports Ukrainian nationalism, or what it calls "Ukrainocentralism." In practice, it advocates for policies that privilege ethnic Ukrainian culture and the Ukrainian language. Some of these policies include protecting Ukrainian as the sole state language, enforcing the mandatory use of only Ukrainian in all government communications and workplaces, and what the party refers to as "Ukrainianizing Ukraine." In pursuit of these policies, with the support of the Lviv City Council, the UGP asked the Ukrainian parliament in 2016 to mandate that all radio programming in Lviv Oblast be in Ukrainian as opposed to Russian.

The Ukrainian Galician Party advocates for Ukrainian membership in NATO and the European Union.

== Structure ==
Unlike most Ukrainian political parties, the Ukrainian Galician Party does not have a single leader. Instead, it is run by a political council. Representatives to the council are elected every two years by members of the party.

The party is headquartered in Lviv, but also has offices in the cities of Ivano-Frankivsk, Ternopil, and Kyiv. It publishes a newspaper, Our Galicia (Ukrainian: Наша Галичина), with a main edition and local editions in each of the three regions it operates in.

The UGP holds an annual congress, during which it elects members to the political council and decides policy priorities for the upcoming year.

== Electoral history ==
=== 2015 Ukrainian local elections ===
The 2015 Ukrainian local elections saw the Ukrainian Galician Party's debut in electoral politics, participating for the first time in elections for seats across all three Galician regions of Lviv, Ivano-Frankivsk, and Ternopil. It won a total of 91 races across the three regions, most notably gaining four seats in the Lviv City Council.

=== 2019 Ukrainian parliamentary election ===
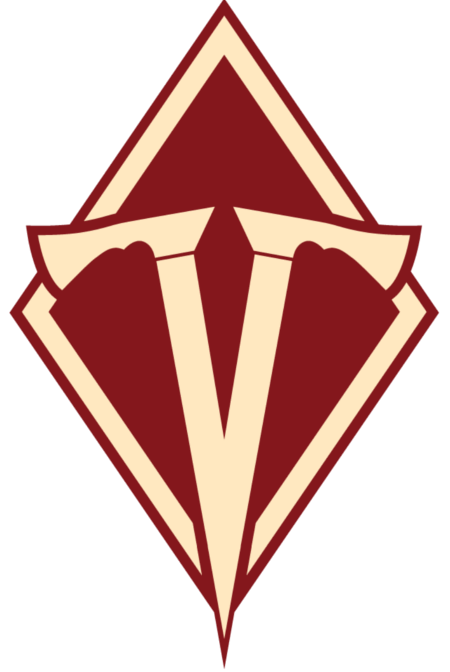
Power of the People (left) and Democratic Axe (right)

In May 2019, in the run-up to the snap 2019 Ukrainian parliamentary election, the Ukrainian Galician Party announced a partnership with two other political parties, Power of the People and Democratic Axe, under the name "Resistance to Russian Aggression." Under the agreement, only one of the three parties could run a candidate in any single-member parliamentary constituency in order to avoid acting as a spoiler.

At the tenth congress of the UGP in June 2019, with under two months left until the election, the party announced an electoral coalition with the newly created Voice party. Under the terms of the coalition, UGP candidates would be added to Voice's national electoral list, and the party would not contest single-member districts. Instead, Voice would seek the UGP's approval of all candidates for single-member constituencies, and the UGP in turn would endorse all Voice candidates in these races.

As a result of the coalition, three UGP members were elected to the Verkhovna Rada as representatives of the Voice party in Lviv Oblast electoral districts, including former political council chairman Roman Lozynskyi. In June 2021, 11 Voice MPs, including all three Ukrainian Galician Party representatives, announced their dissatisfaction with Voice leadership and formed the breakaway parliamentary group Justice.

=== 2020 Ukrainian local elections ===
In the October 2020 Ukrainian local elections, the UGP made significant gains across Galicia. It saw success in Lviv Oblast, where it gained six seats on the Lviv Oblast Council. This was the first time the party was represented in any oblast legislature. All in all, the party saw its total number of elected officials swell to 219.

Soon after the election, the UGP announced that it would not consider a coalition on the Lviv Oblast Council with representatives from parties it deemed "oligarchic, compromised, or corrupt." This included the majority of the groups on the council, namely European Solidarity, For the Future, Svoboda, People's Movement of Ukraine, Batkivshchyna, and Servant of the People. It expressed interest in the possibility of forming a partnership with Self Reliance or Voice, with which it had previously partnered during the 2019 Ukrainian parliamentary election, although neither coalition would provide it with a plurality on the 84-seat council. Ultimately, it failed to form a coalition, and currently sits in opposition on the Lviv Oblast Council.

== Election results ==
=== Lviv Oblast Council ===
Year	Popular vote	% of popular vote	Overall seats won	Seat change	Government
2015	33,842	3.22	0 / 84	New	
2020	43,744	5.66	6 / 84	▲6	

== See also ==
- Politics of Ukraine
- History of Galicia
- Lviv Oblast Council
