= Anastasiya Radina =

Ukrainian politician

Anastasiia Radina
- Анастасія Радіна
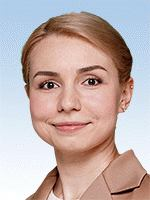
- Official portrait, 2019

Member of the Verkhovna Rada
- Incumbent
- Assumed office 29 August 2019

Personal details
- Born: Anastasiya Olehivna Krasnosilska; 23 June 1984 (age 41) Kyiv, Ukrainian SSR, Soviet Union
- Party: Servant of the People (part of its parliamentary faction, but not a member)
- Other political affiliations: Independent

Anastasiya Olehivna Radina (Ukrainian: Анастасія Олегівна Радіна; née Krasnosilska; born 23 June 1984) is a Ukrainian politician and member of the 9th Verkhovna Rada since 29 August 2019. She is grouped with the Servant of the People parliamentary faction, but is not a member of this political party.

She is an expert on the fight against corruption, judicial and law enforcement reform, as she is a member of the National Council on Anti-Corruption Policy since 25 June 2019.

== Biography ==
Anastasiya Krasnosilska was born in Kyiv on 23 June 1984.

She graduated from the Faculty of Law of the Kyiv National Economic University named after Vadym Hetman and the Faculty of Philosophy of the Kyiv National Taras Shevchenko University.

She is a tax law expert. She was one of the leaders of the campaign to establish the Supreme Anti-Corruption Court in Ukraine (HACC). From 2016 to 2019, she was the head of advocacy programs at the Anti-Corruption Action Center. Since 10 June 2019 she is a member of the Ukrainian delegation to the Council of Europe Group of States against Corruption (GRECO)

She is an expert of the USAID Ukraine project "Citizens in Action"

She was an assistant consultant to People's Deputy of Ukraine Pavlo Ryzanenko.

Radina was a candidate for People's Deputies from the Servant of the People party in the 2019 parliamentary elections, No. 8 on the list. She started as an individual entrepreneur. She was an independent at the time of the election.

She became a member of the National Council on Anti-Corruption Policy (NACP) on 25 June 2019.

A month later, Radina was named a candidate for the position of the head of the committee on prevention and countering corruption in the Verkhovna Rada of the 9th convocation. She was elected as the head of the committee on 29 August.

On 22 July 2025, Radina's vote was counted in Rada along with 184 other MPs aligned with the Servant of the People parliamentary faction against law 12414 which would limit the independence of anti-corruption law enforcement organizations SAPO and NABU.
