= Serhiy Babak =

Ukrainian politician

Serhii Babak
- Сергій Бабак
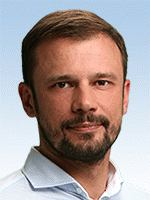
- Official portrait, 2019

People's Deputy of Ukraine
- Incumbent
- Assumed office 29 April 2019

Personal details
- Born: Serhii Vitaliiovych Babak; 31 July 1978 (age 47) Kyiv, Ukrainian SSR, Soviet Union
- Party: Servant of the People

Serhii Vitaliiovych Babak (Ukrainian: Сергій Віталійович Бабак; born on 31 July 1978) is a Ukrainian politician, lawyer, economist, psychologist, is a who is currently a member of the Verkhovna Rada since 29 April 2019 from the Servant of the People party.

He is the doctor of technical sciences, candidate of economic sciences, the co-founder of the Ukrainian Heritage Foundation, and curator of the educational direction of the Ukrainian Institute of the Future.

He is the chairman of the Committee on Education, Science and Innovation in the Verkhovna Rada of the 9th convocation since 29 August 2019.

== Biography ==
Between 1999 and 2002, he was the director of the Department for Entrepreneurship and Investment Attraction of the Ukrainian Union of Industrialists and Entrepreneurs.

From 2002 to 2008, he was the Deputy Secretary General of the Ukrainian National Committee of the International Chamber of Commerce.

Between 2012 and 2019, he was the Director of the SE "Scientific and Technical Center of the Latest Technologies".

FRom 2018 to 2019, he was the curator of the educational direction of the Ukrainian Institute of the Future.

In 2019, he graduated from Uzhhorod National University, receiving a master's degree in psychology.

He was a member of the National Agency for Quality Assurance in Higher Education, vice-rector and adviser to the rector of the University of Advanced Technologies.

Babak was a candidate for people's deputies from the Servant of the People party in the 2019 parliamentary elections, No. 11 on the list. At the time of the elections, he was the deputy director of the State Scientific Institution "Center for Marine Geology, Geoecology and Sedimentary Ore Formation of the National Academy of Sciences of Ukraine", and is an independent.

He is the chairman of the Verkhovna Rada Committee on Education, Science and Innovation.

== Criticism ==
He spoke about the statement that "$200 million a year is enough to pay Ukrainian teachers a salary of $4,000 a month", that "this is absolutely not fiction, these are absolutely real numbers", having made a mistake in the calculations by more than 20 billion dollars.

Babak's doctoral dissertation revealed numerous cases of plagiarism, and accordingly, he was recognized as the "Plagiarist of the Year" in Ukraine in 2019.
