= Oleh Makarov (politician) =

Ukrainian politician (1965–2024)

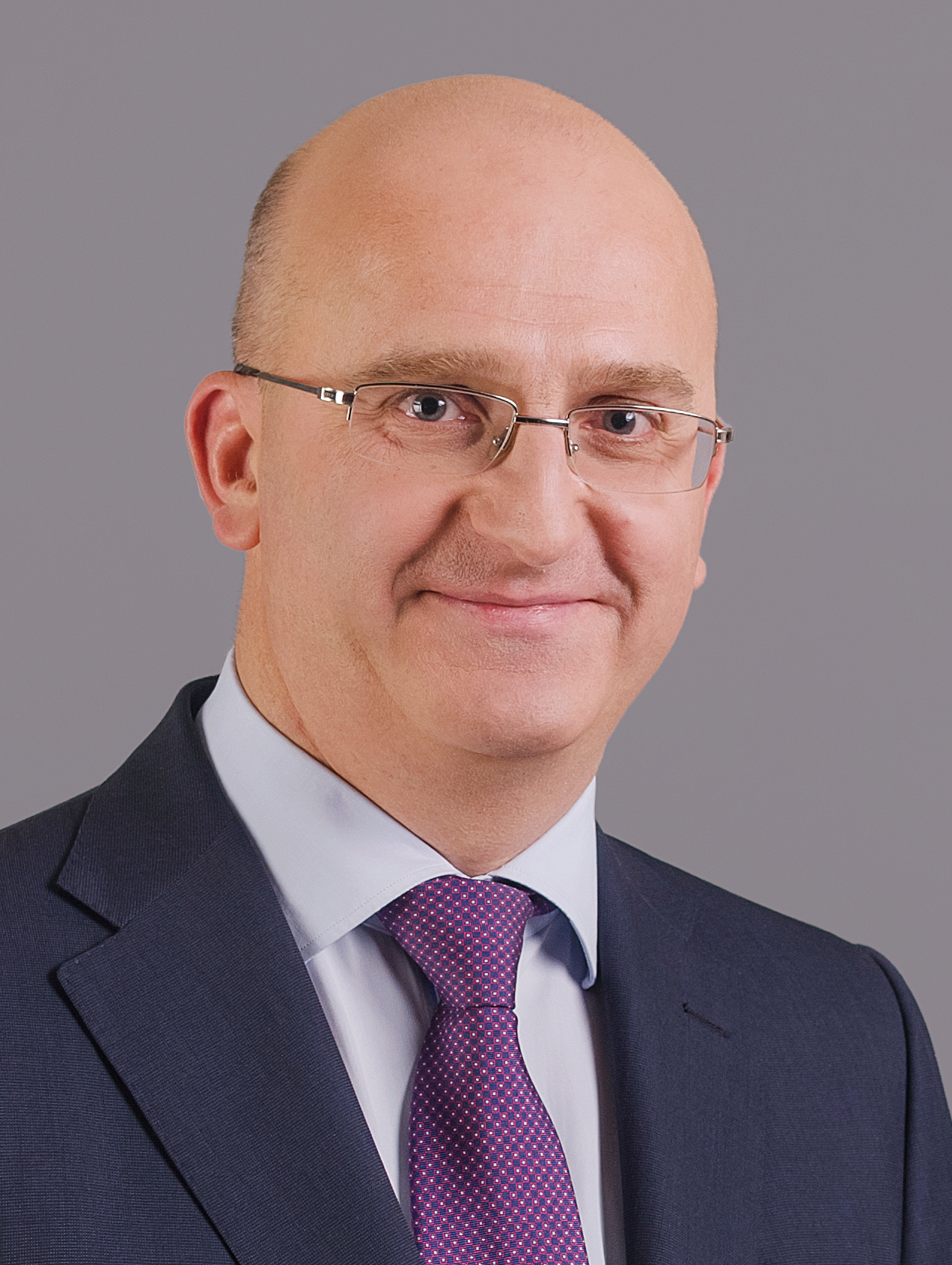
Oleh Makarov

Oleh Anatoliiovych Makarov (Ukrainian: Олег Анатолійович Макаров; 24 July 1965 – 29 October 2024) was a Ukrainian lawyer and politician. People's deputy of Ukraine of the 9th convocation.

== Life and career ==
Oleh Makarov was born in Kyiv on 24 July 1965. In 1989 he graduated from Kyiv National University, Faculty of International Relations and International Law, International Law Department. He completed postgraduate studies at the same university.

In 1992 Makarov became a managing partner of the law firm Vasil Kisil & Partners. In 1995 he received the right to practice law. In 2007 Makarov became the deputy chairman of the Disciplinary Chamber of the Kyiv City Bar Qualification and Disciplinary Commission and became a member of the board of the public organization "Association of Lawyers of Ukraine". In 2015 he became member of the Ethics Commission of this organization.

In 2013 Makarov obtained an MBA degree from Heriot-Watt University.

In the 2015 Kyiv local elections Makarov became a deputy of the Kyiv City Council. He ran for District No. 21 (Darnytskyi District) for the "Self Reliance" party. He was the deputy head of the faction. In September 2018 Makarov joined Team Kyiv. (The local faction of "Self Reliance" had been dissolved by its members.)

Makarov was a candidate for People's Deputies from the "Holos" party in the 2019 Ukrainian parliamentary election, No. 6 on the list. He was elected to the Verkhovna Rada (parliament of Ukraine).

After having been "seriously ill" in the previous months, Makarov died on 29 October 2024, at the age of 59.
