= Andriy Herus =

Ukrainian civil servant and politician

- Андрій Герус
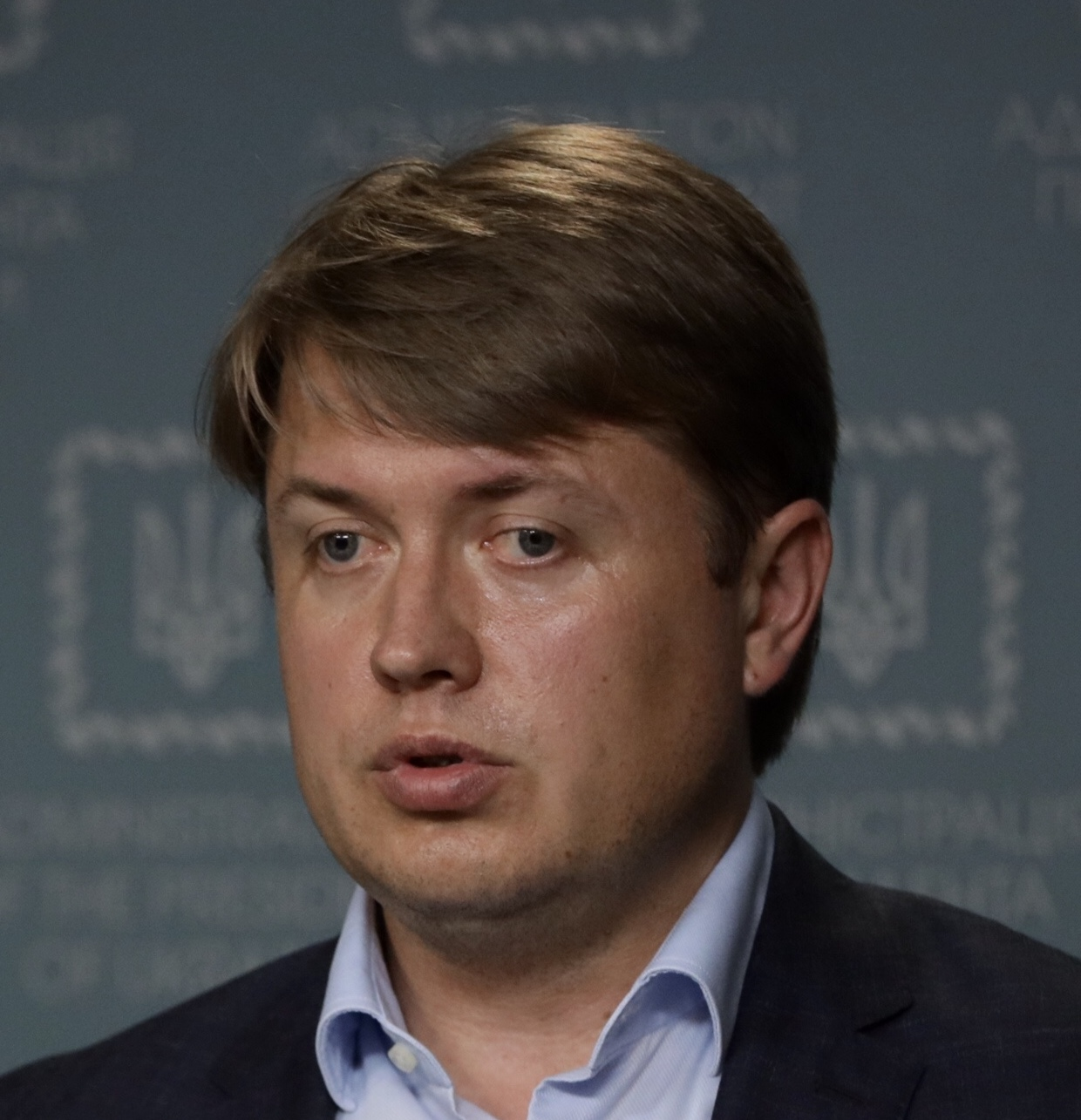
- Born: 18 March 1982 (age 44); Novovolynsk, Ukraine. Soviet Union
- Occupations: Ukrainian civil servant and politician
- Political party: Servant of the People

Andriy Mykhailovych Herus (born March 18, 1982, in the city of Novovolynsk, Volyn Oblast, Ukraine) is a Ukrainian civil servant and politician. He was the representative of President Zelenskyy in the Cabinet of Ministers of Ukraine from May 22 to November 11, 2019.

He is a People's Deputy of Ukraine of the 9th convocation.

== Biography ==
He was born in a mining family. He graduated from the Faculty of Economics of Lviv University (majoring in Economic Cybernetics), and received an MBA from the Grenoble School of Business (London).

From 2003 to 2007, he was an investment analyst, director of trade and investment activities at Galnaftogaz. From 2007 to 2014 he worked as the Director of Investment Activities for Concorde Capital. In 2015, he became the Executive Director of Concorde Capital.

From 2014 to 2015, he was a member of the National Regulatory Commission for Energy and Utilities (NCRECP).

== Political activity ==
In the 2015 Kyiv local elections, Herus was a candidate for the Kyiv City Council from the Samopomich party. In 2017, he became the chairman of the NGO "Association of Energy Consumers and Utilities". He was one of the main critics of the fuel pricing formula "Rotterdam Plus".

Herus was a member of the team of the 2019 presidential candidate Volodymyr Zelenskyy, and a candidate for People's Deputies from the Servant of People Party in the 2019 parliamentary elections, No. 17 on the list. He was elected to parliament. Herus lives in Kyiv.
