= Oleksandra Ustinova =

Ukrainian politician

- Олександра Устінова

People's Deputy of Ukraine
- Incumbent
- Assumed office 29 August 2019
- Constituency: Holos, No. 5

Personal details
- Born: 2 October 1985 (age 41) Vinnytsia, Ukrainian SSR, Soviet Union (now Ukraine)
- Party: Holos (2019–present)
- Education: National University of Kyiv-Mohyla Academy

Oleksandra Yuriivna Ustinova (Ukrainian: Олександра Юріївна Устінова; born 2 October 1985) is a Ukrainian politician and public activist serving as a People's Deputy of Ukraine from the proportional list of the Holos party since 2019. Prior to her election, she was an anti-corruption activist. Ustinova has been lobbying for military aid from the U.S. while being 37 weeks pregnant, explaining the urgency as the death toll in Ukraine rises, writes The Washington Post in March 2022.

== Biography ==
Oleksandra Ustinova was born on 2 October 1985 in Vinnytsia. In 2001, while studying in high school, she completed a one-year study in the United States under the Future Leaders Exchange (FLEX) program. She obtained a Bachelor’s and Master's degree in Political Science at the National University of Kyiv-Mohyla Academy. In 2014, Ustinova graduated from the Ukrainian School of Political Studies. In 2017, she interned in the United States under the Transatlantic Fellowship program. In 2018–2019, she studied at Stanford University under the Ukrainian Emerging Leaders program.

=== Public activity ===
In 2013, Oleksandra Ustinova was an active participant of the Revolution of Dignity. Later she organized help for the children of fallen soldiers of the war in Donbas as a volunteer.

Since 2014, she has been an independent expert and member of the board of the Anti-Corruption Action Center. Before her parliamentary career, she was the head of communications and projects for anti-corruption in healthcare at the Anti-Corruption Action Center (AntAC), a leading Ukrainian watchdog organization. At AntAC, she played a key role in advocating for and establishing several anti-corruption institutions, including the National Anti-Corruption Bureau and the Specialized Anti-Corruption Prosecutor’s Office.

She successfully advocated for the adoption of more than 20 national laws related to anti-corruption reform and healthcare (Athens Democracy Forum) (Stanford FSI).

In 2019, Ustinova was a member of the Center for Combating Corruption and the secretary of the National Anti-Corruption Bureau of Ukraine public oversight board.

== Political career ==
In July 2019, Ustinova was elected as a People's Deputy of Ukraine to the Verkhovna Rada, Ukraine's national parliament, as a member of the Holos (Voice) party. The Holos party is a pro-European political party that emphasizes anti-corruption, the rule of law, and social justice.

As a member of the Verkhovna Rada, Ustinova has been involved in various legislative activities. She has focused on healthcare reform, anti-corruption measures, and social policies. Her work in parliament reflects her commitment to improving government transparency and accountability. Ustinova has been an outspoken critic of corruption in Ukraine and has worked on several initiatives to strengthen anti-corruption institutions and legislation.

Ustinova has also been active in advocating for healthcare reforms. She has pushed for policies to improve the quality and accessibility of healthcare services in Ukraine, addressing systemic issues within the healthcare sector. She was a candidate for the post of mayor of Vinnytsia in 2020 from the “Holos” (Voice) Party.

On 17 December 2021, she became the faction leader of Holos.

Oleksandra Ustinova serves as the Deputy Head of the US-Ukraine Caucus, where she works to strengthen bilateral relations between the United States and Ukraine.

As a Member of the Law Enforcement Committee in the Verkhovna Rada of Ukraine, Oleksandra Ustinova has played a crucial role in shaping policies and legislation related to law enforcement and criminal justice.

Ustinova also is a Member of the Permanent Delegation of the Verkhovna Rada of Ukraine to the Parliamentary Assembly of the Council of Europe.

In October 2022 Ustinova became the chairwoman of the Parliamentary Temporary Special Commission on monitoring arm supplies to Ukraine.[1] As chairwoman, Ustinova is responsible for overseeing the supply of arms to Ukraine, ensuring that the process is transparent and efficient. This includes monitoring the delivery, allocation, and use of military equipment and weapons provided to Ukraine, particularly in the context of the ongoing conflict with Russia. She has been actively involved in international advocacy, meeting with lawmakers in the United States and addressing the U.S. House of Representatives to garner support for Ukraine. The reports from the Parliamentary Temporary Special Commission on monitoring arms supplies to Ukraine are accessible through the Verkhovna Rada's official site.

=== Media Interviews and Statements ===
Oleksandra Ustinova has been an outspoken advocate on various issues through numerous media interviews and public statements.

Ustinova was lobbying for military aid from the U.S. while being 37 weeks pregnant, explaining the urgency as the death toll in Ukraine rises, writes The Washington Post in March 2022.

In March 2022, a few weeks following Russia’s invasion of Ukraine, Ustinova spoke with Today, calling for a no-fly zone and asking for protection of Ukrainian airspace.

Ustinova also spoke with MSNBC in March 2022, expressing her concern over the humanitarian crisis in her country and calling for more protection from the U.S. and NATO.

Additionally, in March 2022, Ustinova gave an interview to Fox News, expressing her concerns for the future of her country and reacting to the Biden administration’s handling of the conflict.

In November 2023, the Atlantic Council wrote about Ustinova’s report that while the West delayed decisions and deliveries of military aid, “the Russians used this time to mine all the occupied territories.”

On February 24, 2024, Ustinova talked with DW News about the second anniversary of the full-scale invasion. She raised questions about the lack of weapon supplies, western aid, and the decrease in support for Ukraine.

She also was mentioned in the article by Foreign Policy, discussing Russia’s capacity to strike about 300 Iranian-made suicide drones in one attack on Ukraine and about 150 ballistic missiles in one shot on Kyiv.

In her interview with CBC in April 2024, Ustinova talked about her efforts in asking the Canadian government for urgent help for Ukraine, stating, “We’ll take your old military equipment and repair it ourselves.”

In May 2024, Oleksandra Ustinova alongside five fellow Ukrainian lawmakers expressed frustration with the U.S. for not sending more Patriot air defense systems to their country, writes Politico.

In May 2024, Politico published an article on how Ukrainian officials, including lawmaker Sasha Ustinova, are pressing the U.S. to increase the number of F-16 pilot training slots, as the current capacity limits the number of pilots who can be trained. Ustinova suggested relocating American pilots to other bases to free up slots, but logistical challenges and prior commitments persist.

Ustinova, as a Chair of the Special Commission on Monitoring Arms Supplies, explained how the U.S. justifies its refusal to train Ukrainian pilots on F-16s in an interview with Radio NV on June 18, 2024.

=== Personal life ===
Oleksandra Ustinova is married and has a daughter named Victoria.
