= Justice (parliamentary group) =

"Justice" Parliamentarian Association Депутатське об’єднання «Справедливість»
- Chairperson: Oleksandra Ustinova
- Deputy chairperson: Yulia Klymenko
- Founded: 7 September 2021
- Split from: Holos
- Headquarters: Kyiv
- Ideology: Liberalism; Anti-corruption; Pro-Europeanism
- Political position: Centre to centre-right
- Verkhovna Rada affiliation: Holos
- Colours: Blue
- Verkhovna Rada: 11 / 450

Website
- spravedlyvist.org.ua

The Parliamentarian Association "Justice" (Ukrainian: Депутатське об’єднання «Справедливість», romanized: Deputatske obiednannia «Spravedlyvist») is a parliamentary faction in the Verkhovna Rada (the national parliament of Ukraine), founded in 2021 by 11 deputies of the Holos party who disagree with the actions of the party leadership.

== History ==
The political party Holos, which was established in May 2019, won 20 seats in the July 2019 parliamentary election.

In January 2021, Kira Rudyk, Yaroslav Zheleznyak and Oleksandra Ustinova began negotiations, moderated by Rustem Umierov, to prevent a split in Holos's parliamentary faction. These talks failed and in June 2021 the faction in the Verkhovna Rada (Ukraine's national parliament) finally split. 11 out of 20 Holos MPs, led by Ustinova, separated into the parliamentary association Justice.

In the 2019 parliamentary election, several Ukrainian Galician Party members were elected to parliament as part of an alliance with Holos. All Ukrainian Galician Party members became member of the breakaway group.

On 17 December 2021, the leader of Justice, Ustinova officially became the head of the Holos faction, instead of Yaroslav Zheleznyak, who represents the party establishment. Zheleznyak did not recognise this official announcement by First Deputy Chairman of the Verkhovna Rada Oleksandr Kornienko.

Unification talks between Rudyk and Ustinova restarted in January 2022.
