= Kira Rudik =

Ukrainian politician

- Кіра Рудик
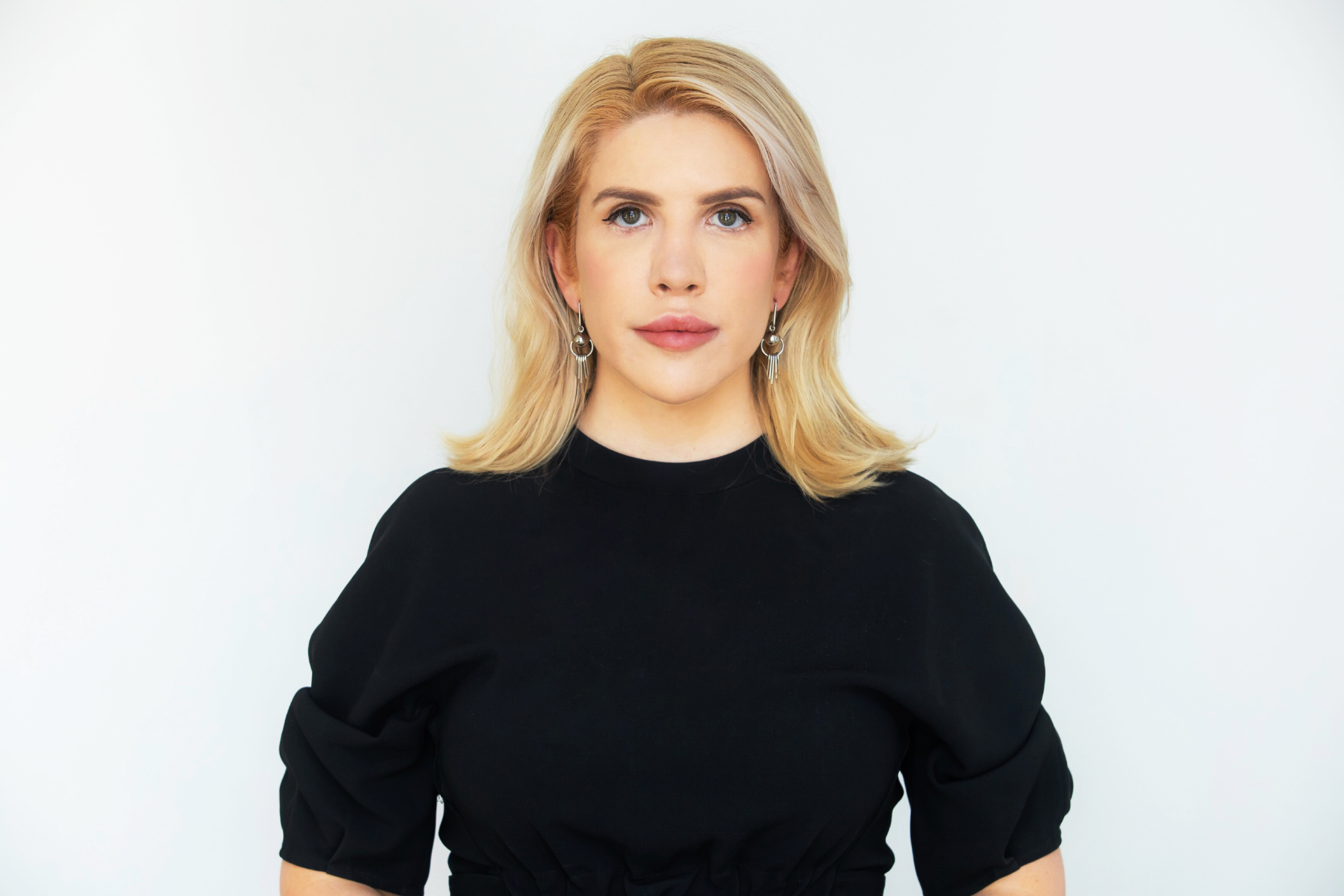
- Rudik in 2023

People's Deputy of Ukraine
- Incumbent
- Assumed office 29 August 2019
- Constituency: Holos, No. 3

Leader of Holos
- Incumbent
- Assumed office 12 March 2020
- Preceded by: Svyatoslav Vakarchuk

Personal details
- Born: 14 October 1985 (age 40) Uzhhorod, Ukrainian SSR, Soviet Union (now Ukraine)
- Party: Holos
- Education: National University of Kyiv-Mohyla Academy

Kira Oleksandrivna Rudik (Ukrainian: Кіра Олександрівна Рудик; born 14 October 1985) is a Ukrainian politician currently serving as a People's Deputy of Ukraine from the proportional list of the Holos party. She is additionally the party's leader, and vice president of the Alliance of Liberals and Democrats for Europe (ALDE). Prior to politics she worked in the Ukrainian and American IT industries. She was a member of the board of the American Chamber of Commerce in Ukraine and the IT Association of Ukraine.

== Childhood and education ==
Kira Rudik was born on 14 October 1985 in Uzhhorod. In 2002, she graduated from school No. 1 in Uzhgorod with an in-depth study of the English language. While studying at school, she participated in Olympiads in mathematics, physics, chemistry, the Ukrainian language and other subjects. Graduated from a music school with two majors: piano and percussion instruments.

In 2008, she obtained a Master's degree at the Kyiv-Mohyla Academy, defending her thesis on the topic "Automated agent-oriented systems in control systems and technologies".

Rudik is a 2018 graduate of the Stanford Women's Executive Program.

== Career and business ==
In 2005, in the third year of the Kyiv-Mohyla Academy, Kira started working in the IT field at Software MacKiev. Since 2007, she has tested software at TAIN Ukraine. She worked as a manager of several IT projects, in particular American MiMedia (2010—2013) and TechTeamLabs (2013—2016).

Since 2016, she has been the chief operating officer of Ring Ukraine. In 3 years, under her leadership, the company increased its staff in Ukraine from ten to a thousand employees with offices in three cities, and the company was considered the most innovative development office in Ukraine. In 2018, Ring was sold to Amazon for $1 billion, making it the second-largest asset purchase in Amazon's history.

== Political activity ==
In the 2019 Ukrainian parliamentary election, Rudik was elected as a People's Deputy of Ukraine as the third member of the proportional list of the Holos party. In the Verkhovna Rada (Ukraine's parliament), she became the first deputy head of the Digital Transformation Committee. She is a co-chairperson of the group on inter-parliamentary relations with Singapore and a Member of the inter-factional association "Equal Opportunities", which aims to ensure gender equality.

As a People's Deputy, Rudik has continued to support the IT industry and opposes tax increases for IT professionals. In addition, she is a co-author of a number of draft laws In the Committee on Digital Transformation, she has been working on such projects as the switching to the "Paperless" mode in governance; introduction of the world's first digital passports; "state in a smartphone" project implying digitalization of public services and harmonization of legislation with the EU space; introduction of public electronic registers.

In addition, she is a co-author of a number of draft laws in the field of economy, social protection, animal protection.

On 12 December 2019, Rudik became the co-chair of the Humane Country Association, created on the initiative of the UAnimals to protect animals from cruelty. As part of work at Humane Country, she is engaged in advocacy and promotion of laws regarding the humane treatment of animals. In particular, they established by law the responsibility for the abuse of animals, and banned fireworks. Next up is the ban on the use of animals in circuses and dolphinariums.

On 11 March 2020, the congress of the Holos party elected Rudik as the head of the party. Before that, Sviatoslav Vakarchuk was the head of the party. In July 2020, Rudik announced the transition of the party to the opposition. Rudik has claimed that Holos is the first liberal party to form a faction in the Verkhovna Rada.

Under Rudik's leadership, the party successfully took part in the 2020 Ukrainian local elections, securing the election of more than 300 of its representatives to local councils, including in Kyiv, Lviv, Rivne and 50 other cities and communities. More than 50% of deputies elected by Holos are women. Under Rudik's leadership, Holos also became the first of the parliamentary parties of Ukraine to receive full membership in the Alliance of Liberals and Democrats for Europe (ALDE).

On 4 September 2020, Russia included Rudik in the list of persons subject to special economic measures.

On 4 June 2022, she was elected vice president of the ALDE, for the first time in history from among countries that are not members of the EU. As the vice president of ALDE, on the eve of the decision to grant Ukraine the status of a candidate for EU membership, she made a working visit to Brussels, where she held political meetings in support of the historic decision with European parliamentarians.

At ALDE she is focused on ensuring the interaction of liberal parties with Ukraine and promoting interests of Ukraine in the European Parliament; representation of countries outside the EU (Ukraine, Georgia, Moldova, Iceland and Norway); acceleration of the EU enlargement process (first of all, European integration of Ukraine); advocacy for female leadership within the framework of the "Alliance of Her" program.

In November 2022, she received the Women In Politics Champion of the Year Award from The Alliance of Her.

=== Russian invasion of Ukraine ===
With the beginning of the Russian invasion of Ukraine on 24 February 2022, Rudik has taken an active part in forming sustainable international support for Ukraine. On the day of the Russian invasion, she was in the Verkhovna Rada, where she supported the introduction of martial law and the adoption of all bills necessary for defense.

From the first days of the war, in communication with European and American politicians and international media, she advocated for the introduction of a no-fly zone over Ukraine, and also for quickly providing Ukraine with the necessary weapons. Advocates for negotiations between Ukraine and its partners with Russia exclusively from a position of strength.

Rudik has expressed support for the confiscation of seized Russian assets in favor of Ukraine, as well as recognition of Russia as a state sponsor of terrorism for further expansion of sanctions.

Together with Bill Browder, Rudik has participated in an advocacy campaign for the adoption of laws on the confiscation of the Russian property registered in the United States, United Kingdom, and Canada, and channeling those funds to support Ukraine and its post-war reconstruction.

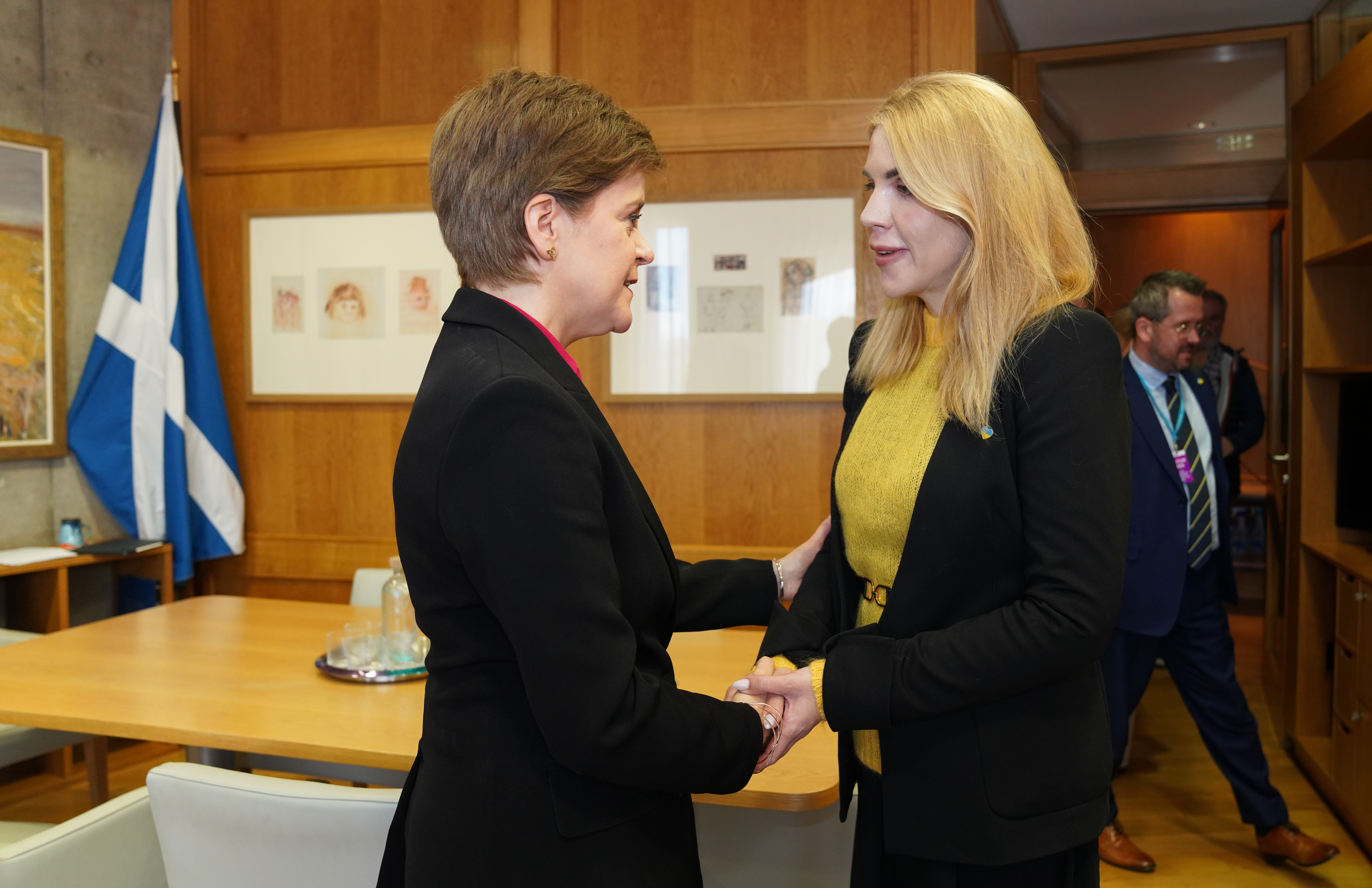
Scottish First Minister Nicola Sturgeon meeting Kira Rudik in May 2022

In May 2022 Rudik traveled to Scotland for a meeting the First Minister Nicola Sturgeon. She thanked her for the support of Scotland. In June 2022, she visited Lithuania and Sweden, where she held meetings with the Speaker of the Seimas Viktorija Čmilytė-Nielsen, the Mayor of Vilnius Remigijus Šimašius, and Swedish and Lithuanian parliamentarians to strengthen support for Ukraine. She was a participant in the 75th Liberal International Congress, where she spoke in a panel discussion on security and the new world order.

She participated in the work of the European Union summit, where Ukraine received the status of a candidate for EU membership, held a meeting with French President Emmanuel Macron as part of the summit of leaders of European liberal parties.

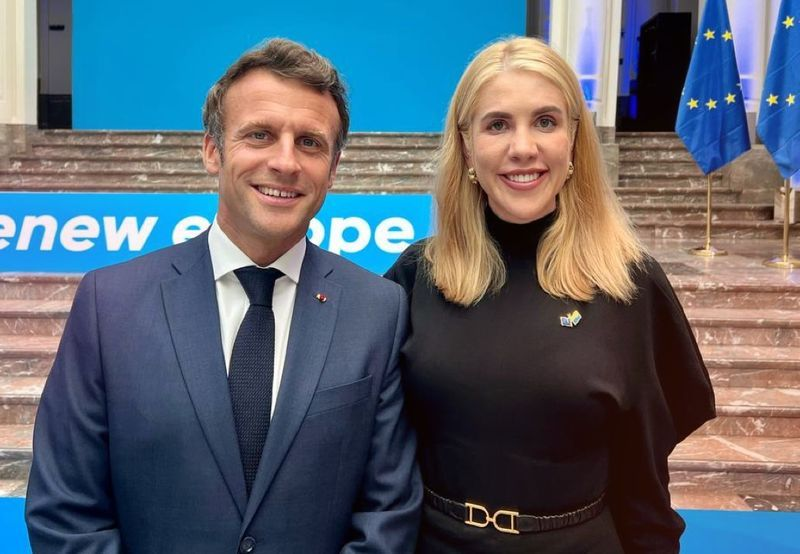
French President Emmanuel Macron meeting Kira Rudik in June 2022

While taking part in the General Assembly of the Africa Liberal Network, Rudik said that an important task for a politician is the consolidation of political support for Ukraine from the countries of the Global South and noted that it was necessary to convince African liberal partners of the need for real actions in support of Ukraine and international security, to call together with Ukrainians to protect international peace, security and territorial integrity and strengthen Ukraine's position in the Global South.

At a meeting with the former Speaker of the US House of Representatives Nancy Pelosi in Washington, D.C., Rudik spoke about publicly supporting the confiscation of Russian assets in favor of Ukraine. The former speaker of the US House of Representatives is known for her support of Ukraine. In particular, Nancy Pelosi made a statement that Russia should be recognized as a state sponsor of terrorism.

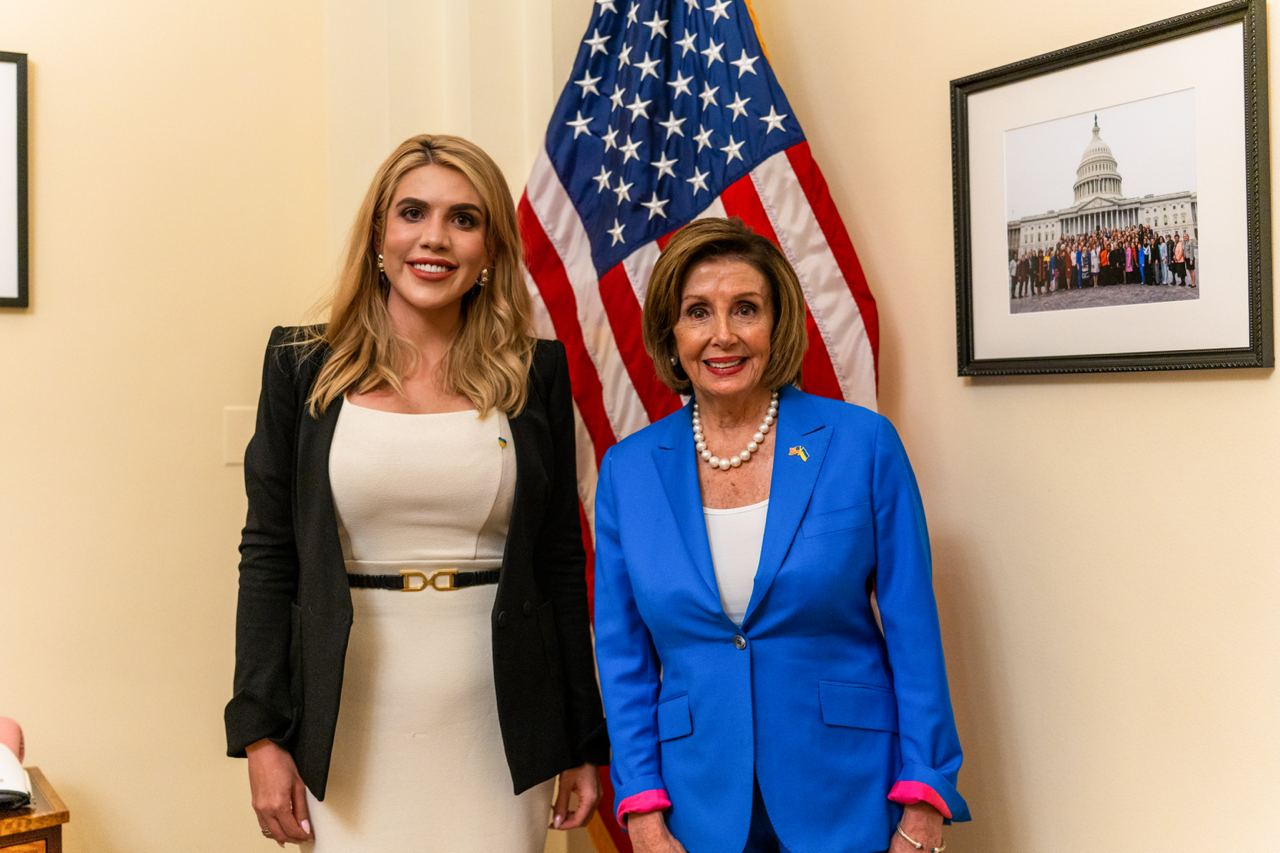
Former speaker of the US House of Representatives Nancy Pelosi meeting Kira Rudik in September 2022

During a meeting with Estonian Prime Minister Kaja Kallas, Kira Rudik presented a project to confiscate Russian assets for the benefit of Ukraine. Estonia was chosen for the presentation of the project because of the huge contribution made by the Baltic states in support of Ukraine.

At the conference of the British Liberal Democrats in Bournemouth in the fall of 2023, Rudik called on the Liberal Democrats to help accelerate the process of confiscating Russian assets and transferring them to Ukraine. Along with William Browder and Henry Jackson Society director Alan Mendoza, she participated in a panel discussion on the confiscation of Russian assets, where she stated that progress toward confiscation was not only a matter of justice and necessity, but also a clear signal to other dictatorships across the world.

At the Global Forum of Women Leaders in Reykjavík, she met with former president of Lithuania Dalia Grybauskaitė and Prime Minister of Iceland Katrín Jakobsdóttir, at which she thanked them for their comprehensive support of Ukrainians' struggle for freedom and democracy.

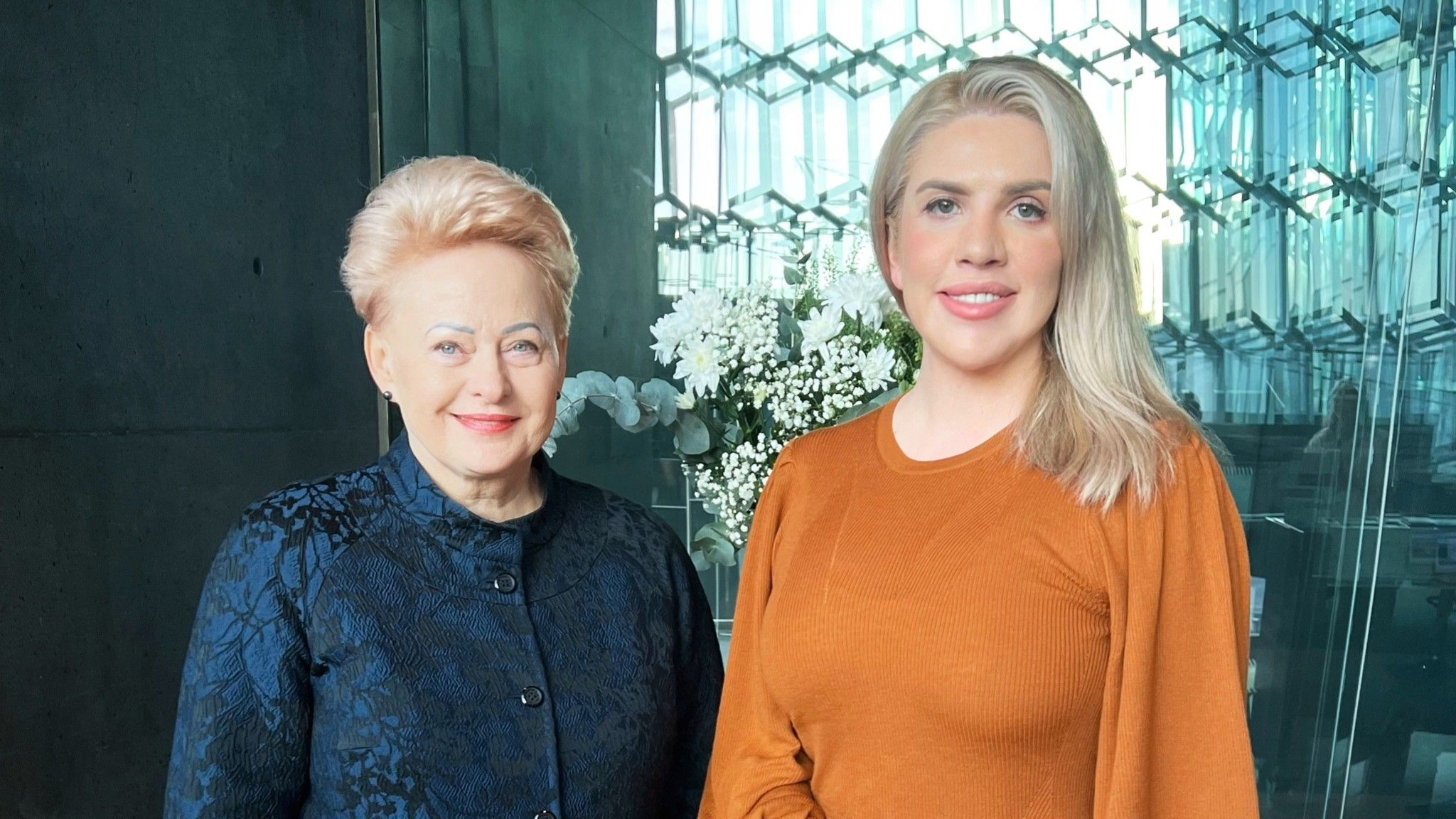
Dalia Grybauskaitė & Kira Rudik, Reykjavík, November 2023

Rudik has advocated for increased ties between Ukraine and Taiwan, and was one of the first People's Deputies of Ukraine to visit Taiwan. During her visit, she met with President Tsai Ing-wen and representatives of the Legislative Yuan and the government.

=== Social activities ===
In ALDE Rudik is responsible for the advocacy of female leadership and the "Alliance of Her" program created for women from various European countries who are starting their careers in politics. About 200 participants have completed the program, having received knowledge, experience, and support from the leaders of European politics.

=== Media activity ===
Since the beginning of the Russian invasion of Ukraine, Kira Rudik has been conducting an active information campaign in the leading mass media of the United States, United Kingdom, Canada, and Europe in support of Ukraine, advocating for the provision of military, financial and political support to the country.

She joined CNN, Fox News, NBC, MSNBC, Newsmax, BBC World, Sky News, GB News, Times Radio, Polsat, TVN24, TVP World, Talk TV, Al Jazeera, CBC, CBS, ABC News, Bloomberg, France 24, BFM TV, LBC, LCI, ITV, CTV, Deutsche Welle, RTE Ireland and other leading information platforms. She was interviewed by the leading media outlets of the United States, Great Britain and Poland, such as The Guardian, BBC HARDtalk, Euractiv, Rzeczpospolita etc.

Rudik is a columnist for the key Ukrainian internet media outlets Ukrainska Pravda, Liga.net, Livyi Bereh, The New Voice of Ukraine, as well as Western top media platforms such as: The Wall Street Journal, The Hill, The Telegraph, Huffington Post, Atlantic Council, Newsweek etc.
