= Holos (Ukraine) =

Voice Голос
- Leader: Kira Rudik
- Vice leader: Inna Sovsun
- Faction leader: Oleksandra Ustinova
- Founder: Svyatoslav Vakarchuk
- Founded: 16 May 2019; 7 years ago
- Preceded by: Platform of Initiatives
- Headquarters: Kyiv, Ukraine
- Membership (2021): c. 500 (Note: According to the party leader Kira Rudik in February 2021.)
- Ideology: Liberalism (Ukrainian); Anti-corruption; Pro-Europeanism
- Political position: Centre-right
- European affiliation: Alliance of Liberals and Democrats for Europe
- International affiliation: Liberal International (observer)
- Colours: Orange
- Slogan: The party of real changes
- Verkhovna Rada: 19 / 450
- Regions: 338 / 43,122

Website
- goloszmin.org

Holos (Ukrainian: Голос [ˈɦɔlos], lit. 'Voice' or 'Vote') is a liberal and pro-European political party in Ukraine, led by Kira Rudik. The group was founded by Ukrainian musician Svyatoslav Vakarchuk in May 2019.

The party won 20 seats in the 2019 parliamentary election, becoming part of the opposition in the 9th Ukrainian parliament. An observer-member of Liberal International, Holos is the first party with liberal ideology to enter the Ukrainian Parliament and form a faction. After the local elections in 2020, the party gained 350 seats in the local councils.

== Name ==
The name of the party has two meanings in the Ukrainian language: voice and vote. The founder of the party, Svyatoslav Vakarchuk, said that the name of the party was chosen because this word characterizes Ukrainian voters and their desire for change in the country:

It has two meanings, and both are very important to us. <...> Because Voice is their [the voters'] voice, by which they demonstrate a desire for change, it is their voice of change. On the other hand, it is their vote, that they can cast [in elections]. <...> The voice, in fact, characterizes Ukrainian voters and their desire for change. What else, if not the voice?

== History ==
=== Establishment and entry to parliament ===
The party was presented to the public on 16 May 2019 in Kyiv and announced it would run in the upcoming July 2019 Ukrainian parliamentary election. Legally, Holos is an "upgraded" version of the party "Platform of Initiatives" that was founded in 2015 to take part in the 2015 Ukrainian local elections. The creation of the party marks Vakarchuk's second venture into politics – he previously served as an MP for almost a year after being elected in the 2007 Ukrainian parliamentary election.

The party was first featured in the opinion polling carried out from 16 to 21 May 2019, its rating was 4.6%.

The party held its first congress on 8 June 2019, at which part of its party list for the forthcoming elections was announced. The top 10 candidates were as follows: 1) Svyatoslav Vakarchuk, 2) Yulia Klimenko, 3) Kira Rudik, 4) Yaroslav Zheleznyak, 5) Oleksandra Ustinova, 6) Oleh Makarov, 7) Yaroslav Yurchyshyn, 8) Serhiy Rakhmanin, 9) Solomiya Bobrovska, and 10) Olha Stefanyshyna. Prior to the congress, the Ukrainian Galician Party and Voice agreed to cooperate, Ukrainian Galician Party members ran as Voice candidates in single-member constituencies and were added to Voice's national electoral list. On 12 June, the party withdrew two of its constituency candidates because they had "affiliated with or co-operated with pro-Russian forces", namely Ukrainian Choice and the Opposition Bloc. Party leader Vakarchuk had assured on 19 May 2019 that no incumbent MPs would be on the party's list for the 2019 parliamentary election. However, such deputies, whose political views coincided with the party's ideology, were allowed to be elected by majority constituencies. In the election, four incumbent MPs stood as candidates for the party in majority constituencies: Victoria Voytsitska, Pavlo Rizanenko, Victoria Ptashnyk, and Leonid Yemets. None of them were elected.

In the 2019 parliamentary election, Voice finished with 5.82% of the vote, 17 MPs elected nationwide and three MPs elected in a constituency. 47.6% of the party's elected deputies are women.

On 11 March 2020, Vakarchuk stepped aside as head of the party. Voice selected Kira Rudik as its new leader. Vakarchuk left parliament in June 2020, stating that his "mission" (bringing new people with new politics into parliament) was complete.

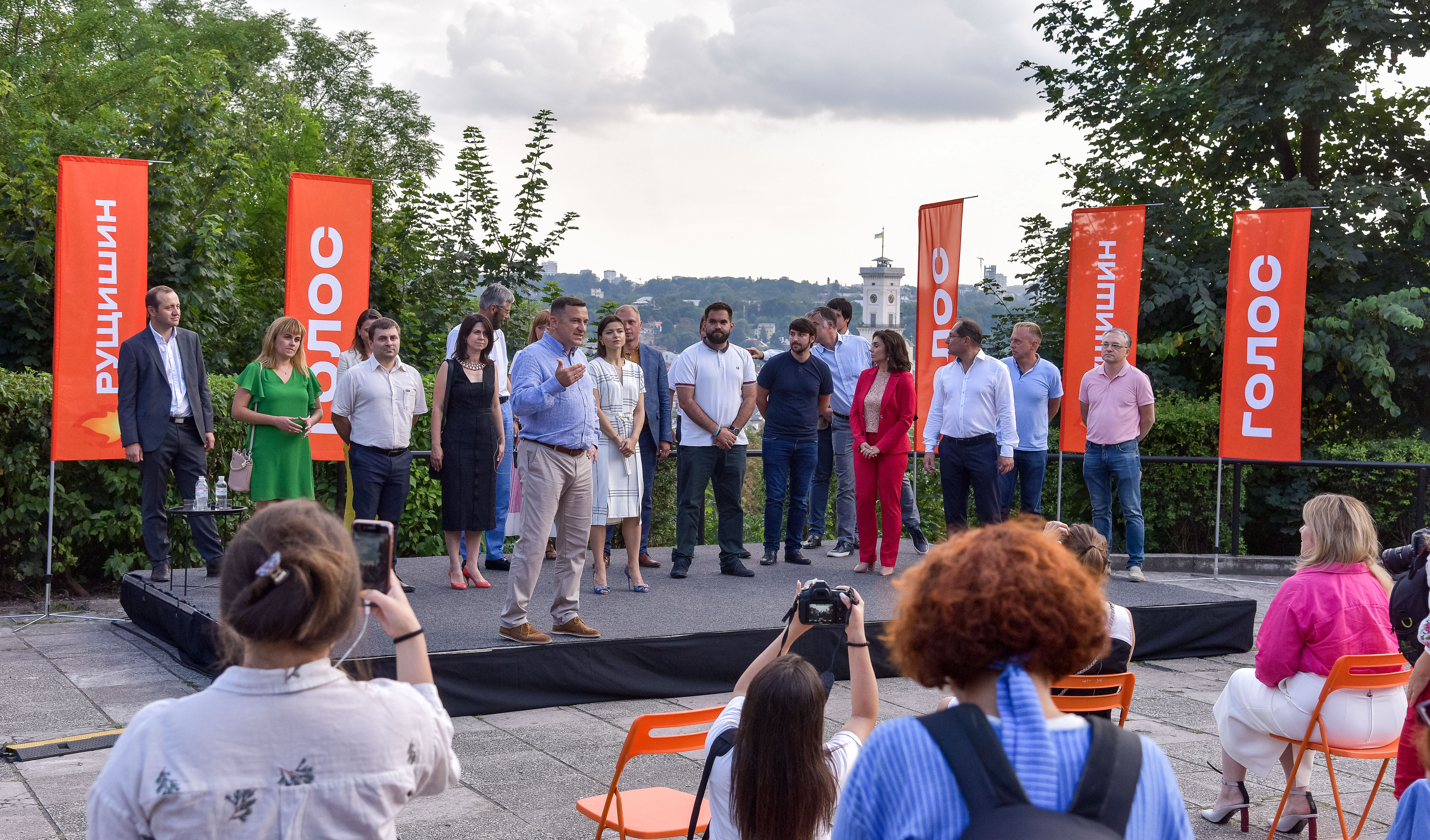
Voice candidates for the 2020 local elections in Lviv

The party was admitted to the Alliance of Liberals and Democrats for Europe (ALDE) on 18 November 2020.

In the October 2020 Ukrainian local elections, Voice had some local success, having led its factions to the Lviv Oblast Council, to the city councils of Kyiv, Lviv, Cherkasy, and a number of other city councils, including even in the Donbas. The party's mayoral candidate made it to the second round of the election in Cherkasy, which he lost.

=== Disunion ===
In June 2021, 10 of the party's 20 MPs announced that they would create a separate association named Justice (Ukrainian: Справедливість; Spravedlyvist) and expressed their lack of confidence in faction leader Yaroslav Zhelezniak. In addition, three of the party's regional branches called on party leader Kira Rudik to resign and demanded that the party hold a congress to select a new leader. The party responded by admitting that it was "going through a difficult period" and announcing a congress at which the conflict within Voice will be addressed. The split was triggered by the decision of five of the party's MPs (including Rudik and Zhelezniak) to vote in favour of the ruling party's initiative to delay the introduction of Ukrainian language quotas for the country's film industry; the dissenting MPs called this "betrayal" and a "vote for Russification".

In late July 2021, a group made up of 11 of the party's MPs attempted to replace faction leader Yaroslav Zhelezniak with his deputy, Roman Kostenko as acting head of the faction. This move failed because for the faction leader to be replaced, firstly two-thirds of the faction have to vote (in this case, 14 MPs), and secondly such a decision can only be made at a faction meeting. A statement countering the attempt was signed by the remaining MPs, including Zhelezniak and Kostenko.

At the party congress of 29 July 2021 it was decided to expel seven of the party MPs. Five of the expelled MPs had already written statements to leave the party. The expelled members were dissatisfied with, according to them, the "cementing of Kira Rudik's control over the party." At the same meeting, 86% of the delegates expressed their confidence in Rudik as the party leader.

As of September 2021, only nine of the party's 20 seats in the Verkhovna Rada (Ukraine's national parliament) are held by MPs who are loyal to the party; the remaining 11 are held by MPs who are part of Spravedlyvist.

=== National (state) funding of the party ===
On 15 December 2021, Voice lost its appeal to the Supreme Court of Ukraine to rollback the January 2021 blocking of the payment of state funds to the party's accounts by the National Agency for Prevention of Corruption (NAPC). The court verdict remanded the case for retrial, but allowed the NAPC to continue blocking the funds. After the violations were eliminated, the NACP resumed the funding.

On 2 February 2022, party leader Kira Rudik stated that a criminal case had been opened against the party regarding its economic activities. In comments on the party's official site Rudik stated that the case was politically motivated, and that Ukraine's State Bureau of Investigation was "systematically attempting to muzzle those who criticise the government while ignoring cases involving 'Ze-friends'".

In June 2024 the NACP stopped the national (state) funding of the party due to (alleged) incorrect information in its reports to amount of almost 5 million hryvnias. The Supreme Court of Ukraine confirmed the legality of the decision of the NACP to stop state funding of the party on 11 October 2024.

== Political positions ==
The party declares a democratic approach, supporting the separation of money from politics. In economic matters, the party is in favor of introducing a tax on withdrawn capital, a land market, privatization of state-owned enterprises, and the fight against illegal customs and tax schemes.

Party leader Vakarchuk stated on 10 June 2019 that the party wants to abolish the current Ukrainian election constituencies (in which 225 seats are elected in constituencies with a first-past-the-post electoral system in one round), instead favoring a shift to full open list proportional representation.

According to the analysis of human rights activist Volodymyr Yavorsky, the party's program pays great attention to human rights, while there are no populist statements in it.

According to experts from the Center for Economic Strategy Dmytro Yablonovsky and Daria Mikhailishin, the program focuses on combating corruption through de-oligarchization and by increasing the efficiency of the state through the introduction of modern technologies.

In November 2019, the party's parliamentary faction stated that because Ukraine could not regain control of separatist Donetsk People's Republic and Luhansk People's Republic and Russian annexed Crimea it should "freeze the conflicts", abandon the Minsk Agreements and focus on strengthening its own positions.

In October 2020, the party claimed that Russia must pay $500 billion in reparations to cover the damage it has caused to the Donbas since 2014.

=== Russian invasion of Ukraine ===
On the morning of February 24, 2022, Holos faction was present in the Verkhovna Rada in full (except for one — MP Oleksandra Ustinova, who at that time was on a business trip) and voted for the draft laws important for security and defense of Ukraine. Besides, two faction’s MPs were the first among all the parliamentarians who went to the front from the very first day of the full-scale Russian invasion: they are Roman Kostenko and Roman Lozynskyi. For security reasons, the party does not provide information about other members of Holos party who joined the Defense Forces of Ukraine but did not announce it publicly.

Since February 24, Holos has been actively working in the Verkhovna Rada, in local representative offices, and at the level of inter-parliamentary diplomacy. In addition, representatives of Holos conduct active volunteer activities and attract international aid.

==== Work with liberal democrats in Europe and across the world ====
In early May 2023, Holos joined the world federation of liberal-democratic parties Liberal International. According to party leader Kira Rudik, Holos has been working with many countries (in particular, the African Liberal Alliance, Taiwan, and countries of Latin America) in order to ensure long-term support for Ukraine.

In 2022, Kira Rudik was elected Vice President of the Alliance of Liberals and Democrats for Europe (ALDE). Kira Rudik became the first representative of a non-EU country in this position. The Ukrainian politician set such tasks:

- ensuring interaction of liberal parties with Ukraine, promotion of Ukraine's interests in the European Parliament;
- representation of countries outside the EU (Ukraine, Georgia, Moldova, Iceland, and Norway);
- acceleration of the EU enlargement process (foremost, the European integration of Ukraine);
- advocacy of women's leadership within the framework of the “Alliance of Her” program.

During ALDE membership, Holos initiated resolutions in support of Ukraine. In particular, in June 2024, the ALDE Council in Vilnius adopted a document on unquestioning support for Ukraine, in which European liberals called to:

- Support the implementation of the Peace Formula and its individual points as part of European security,
- Increase and accelerate the military assistance of our state and our Defense Forces,
- Strengthen sanctions pressure on Russia and eliminate ways of circumventing economic restrictions (measures against the shadow fleet, strengthening export controls etc.).
- The search for effective mechanisms for the use of frozen Russian assets for the needs of Ukraine,
- Strengthening cooperation for the return of Ukrainian children kidnapped by the occupiers.

== Leadership ==
=== Party Leaders ===
| No. | Image | Name | Start date | End date | Time |
|---|---|---|---|---|---|
| 1. | | Svyatoslav Vakarchuk | 16 May 2019 | 11 March 2020 | 300 days |
| 2. | | Kira Rudik | 11 March 2020 | Incumbent | 6 years, 238 days |

=== Faction Leaders ===
| No. | Image | Name | Start date | End date | Time |
|---|---|---|---|---|---|
| 1. | | Serhiy Rakhmanin | 29 August 2019 | 28 December 2020 | 1 year, 121 days |
| 2. | | Yaroslav Zheleznyak | 28 December 2020 | 17 December 2021 | 354 days |
| 3. | | Oleksandra Ustinova | 17 December 2021 | Incumbent | |

== Electoral performance ==
Results of the 2019 elections

=== Verkhovna Rada ===
| Year | Leader | Popular vote | % of popular vote | Position | Overall seats won | +/- | Government |
|---|---|---|---|---|---|---|---|
| 2019 | Svyatoslav Vakarchuk | 849,085 | 5.82 | 5th | 20 / 450 | New | Opposition |

== See also ==
- Category:Holos (political party) politicians
