= Embassy of Ukraine, Stockholm =

Building in Stockholm, Sweden

Embassy of Ukraine in Sweden
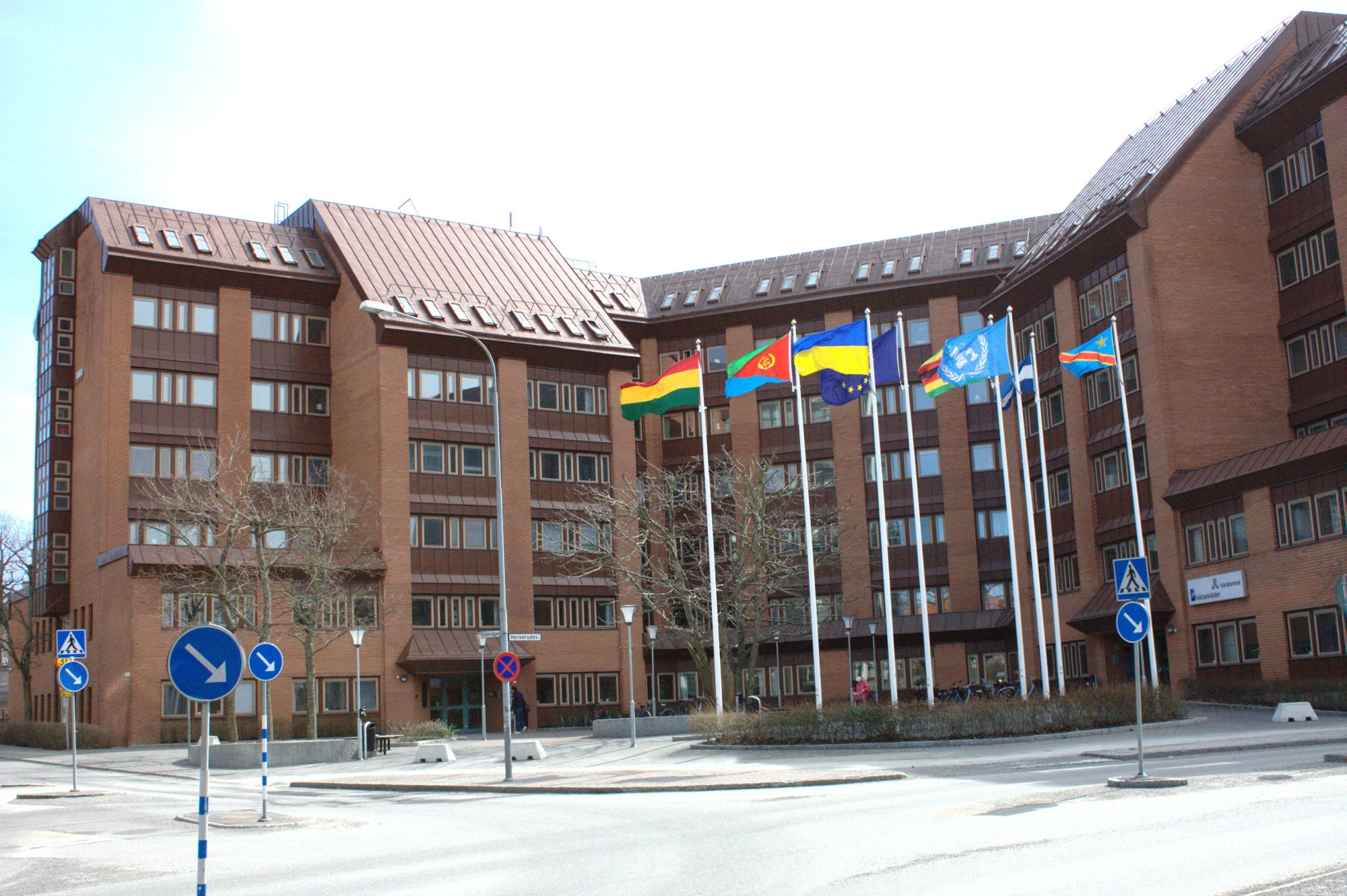
- Embassy of Ukraine in Sweden
- Location: Lidingö, Stockholm
- Ambassador: Svitlana Zalishchuk
- Website: sweden.mfa.gov.ua/ua

The Embassy of Ukraine in Sweden is a diplomatic mission of Ukraine in Lidingö, Stockholm, Sweden.

Svitlana Zalishchuk has been the Ambassador since July 2025.

== History ==
In October 1918 the government of the Ukrainian State "in order to establish permanent diplomatic relations between the Government of the Kingdom of Sweden and the Government of the Ukrainian State, as well as aiming to establish friendly connections and mutual understanding between our two great nations", sent a diplomatic mission to the Scandinavian countries headed by Borys Bazhenov. Borys Bazhenov resided at Grand Hôtel, which still functions on Södra Blasieholmshamnen 8. This address appears as the first location of the diplomatic mission. Later the mission was located in the hotel Regina on Drottninggatan 42–44.

In January 1919 the Directory decided to appoint Kostyantyn Losskyi as the head of the mission. Since his arrival in Stockholm in late February - early March the mission relocated to Drottninggatan, 83 and the head of the mission lived in an apartment on Karlbergsvägen 43b. Starting from 1 October 1919 to February 1920, this address was shared with the office of the mission.

On 19 December 1991 Sweden recognized the independence of Ukraine, and on 13 January 1992 an agreement on establishing diplomatic relations was concluded. Kostyantyn Masyk was appointed as ambassador to Sweden on 16 October 1992. The embassy opened on Markvardsgatan 5 on 31 May 1994. On 1 October 1999 the embassy moved to another location on Stockholmsvägen 18 in Lidingö, the embassy moved again to the current premises on Stjärnvägen 2a on 1 April 2001.

== Diplomatic staff ==
As of 8 January 2020 the embassy had the following diplomatic staff:

- Counsellor, Stanislav Stashevskyi
- Counsellor, Nataliia Bielkina
- First secretary, Kateryna Derepovska
- First secretary, Victoria Tsurtsumia
- First secretary, Oleksandr Savchuk
- First secretary, Roman Stepanov
- Second secretary, Inna Zholtkevych
- Office of Defense Cooperation, Col. Serhii Harbarenko

== List of ambassadors ==
Name	Image	Appointed	Ending
Kostyantyn Masyk		16 October 1992	1994
Ihor Sahach		1994	1997
Ihor Podolyev		28 July 1997	1999
Oleksandr Slipchenko		20 January 1999	2002
Leonid Kozhara		14 November 2002	2004
Oleksandr Danyleiko		2004	2004
Eduard Terpytsky		2004	2006
Anatoliy Ponomarenko		6 December 2006	20 May 2008 (died in office)
Yevhen Perebyinis		2008	2011
Valeriy Stepanov		11 November 2011	2015
Ihor Sahach		19 March 2015	2020
Andrii Plakhotniuk		21 September 2020	21 July 2025
Svitlana Zalishchuk		28 July 2025	Incumbent

== See also ==
- Sweden–Ukraine relations
