= Political parties in Ukraine =

This article presents the historical development and role of political parties in Ukrainian politics, and outlines more extensively the significant modern political parties since Ukraine gained independence in 1991.

== Overview ==
Ukraine has a multi-party system with numerous political parties, in which no one party often has a chance of gaining power alone, and parties must work with each other to form coalition governments. In the (October 2014) Ukrainian parliamentary election 52 political parties nominated candidates. In the nationwide (October 2015) local elections this number had grown to 132 political parties.

Many parties in Ukraine have very small memberships and are unknown to the general public. Party membership in Ukraine is lower than 1% of the population eligible to vote (compared to an average 4.7% in the European Union). National parties currently not represented in Ukraine's national parliament Verkhovna Rada do have representatives in municipal councils. Small parties used to join in multi-party coalitions (electoral blocks) for the purpose of participating in parliamentary elections, but on November 17, 2011, the Ukrainian Parliament approved an election law that banned the participation of blocs of political parties in parliamentary elections. Ukrainian society's trust of political parties is very low overall. According to an April 2014 poll by Razumkov Centre 14.7%. According to a February 2020 poll by again Razumkov Centre, more than 70% of respondents said they rather or completely did not trust political parties.

The Ukrainian oligarchs play a key role in sponsoring of political parties and participation in every day politics.

== Legal framework ==
Parties can only register with the Ministry of Justice if they can "demonstrate a base of support in two-thirds of Ukraine's Oblasts" (Ukraine's 24 primary administrative units) and in two-thirds of the raions of the Autonomous Republic of Crimea. This means that 10,000 signatures needs to be collected in these areas. Including in Crimea, although Ukraine lost control of this territory in 2014 (to Russia). (The only way to fulfill this norm is to get signatures of Ukrainian citizens living elsewhere in Ukraine with Crimean residence.) Then within six months the party must establish regional offices in a majority of the 24 oblasts. In practice these offices rarely stay active and open in-between elections. Because of the procedural difficulties of registering a party the practice of renaming existing political forces is widespread. (For instance, from January to September 2020 50 parties changed their name.) In practice this means that long career politicians in Ukraine regularly switch to a new party.

10 years in a row not nominating candidates for national parliamentary and presidential elections is a legal ground for liquidating a party. (Note: Civil movement "Chesno" claims that 25 parties took part in a 2019 Ukrainian parliamentary election by-election (in electoral district 179 located in Kharkiv Oblast on 15 March 2020) solely to avoid being liquidated.)

Ukraine’s election law forbids outside financing of political parties or campaigns.

All data on any legal political parties as any other public organizations in Ukraine is kept at the Single Registry (Ukrainian: Єдиний реєстр громадських формувань, Yedynyi reyestr hromadskykh formuvan), with online version of which provided by the Ministry of Justice. On 1 January 2020 349 political parties were in this register.

== Major parties and political camps ==
There have developed two major movements (Note: Some Ukrainian parties could not be clearly classified as belonging to one of these two major movements, they were either synthesising the ideas of the two camps and/or strove to position themselves as a balancing force; examples of these parties are Socialist Party of Ukraine, Lytvyn Bloc and Labour Ukraine.) (Note: Ukrainian politicians have switched to parties that belong(ed) to another of these two major movements.) in the Ukrainian parliament since its independence:

- A pro-Western and pro-European general liberal national democrats who from time to time featured individual politicians with a nationalist past (for example Andriy Shkil, Andriy Parubiy and Levko Lukyanenko) with the Our Ukraine Blocs and Bloc Yulia Tymoshenko (now Fatherland) as its frontrunners; UDAR replaced the Our Ukraine Bloc in the 2012 Ukrainian parliamentary election. In the 2014 parliamentary election UDAR did not participate but its members filled 30% of the Petro Poroshenko Bloc election list. The Petro Poroshenko Bloc won the election with 132 seats.
- A pro-Russian, latently Eurosceptic, often anti-American and partly anti-liberal group of parties, which in the 1990s was dominated by the Communist Party of Ukraine, and was dominated by the Party of Regions from the late 2000s until the party disintegrated shortly after the Revolution of Dignity.

The first movement (mentioned above) gets its voters mainly from Western Ukraine and Central Ukraine; the latter from Eastern Ukraine and Southern Ukraine.

Political camps
Pro-Western, pro-NATO, pro-European, anti-Russian, and Ukrainian nationalist	Domination of Russian culture and preservation of Soviet culture, more Eurosceptic, often anti-American and partly anti-liberal	Regional and local interests, city and oblast level politics	Parliamentary groups, formed post-election and often with the backing of an oligarch and few shared positions among members
Servant of the People; European Solidarity; Batkivshchyna; Holos; Radical Party; Strength and Honor; Ukrainian Strategy; Civil Position; Ukrainian Democratic Alliance for Reform; Self Reliance; Democratic Axe	Platform for Life and Peace; Trust the Deeds; Banned: Communist Party of Ukraine; Progressive Socialist Party of Ukraine; Party of Regions; Our Land; Opposition Bloc (2019); Opposition Platform — For Life; Party of Shariy; Nashi; Russian Bloc; Russian Unity	Proposition; Successful Kharkiv; All-Ukrainian Union "Cherkashchany"; Svitlychna Bloc — Together! Native City; Native Zakarpattia; Native Home; Bila Tserkva Together	For the Future; Trust

== Ideology ==
Ukrainian parties tend not to have a clear ideology but to contain different political groups with diverging ideological outlooks. Unlike in Western politics, civilizational and geostrategic orientations play a more important role than economic and socio-political agendas for parties. An example is the membership of the social-democratic Batkivshchyna party in the economically liberal European People's Party. This has led to coalition governments that would be unusual from a Western point of view; for example: the first Azarov government included the Party of Regions, the centrist Lytvyn Bloc and the Communist Party of Ukraine.

== Particularity of parties in Ukraine ==
Professor Paul D'Anieri has argued (in 2006) that Ukrainian parties are "elite-based rather than mass-based," while former Ambassador of Germany to Ukraine (2000–2006) Dietmar Stüdemann from Embassy of Germany, Kyiv believes that personalities are more important in Ukrainian politics than (ideological) platforms. "Parties in the proper meaning of this word do not exist in Ukraine so far. A party for Germans is its platform first, and its personalities later."

== History ==
Number of parties
Date	Amount
January 2009	161
July 2009	172
May 2010	179
July 2010	182
September 2011	197
November 2012	201

=== Independent Ukraine, party forming (early 1990s) ===
Even before Ukraine became independent in August 1991, political parties in Ukraine started to form around intellectuals and former Soviet dissidents. They posed the main opposition to the ruling Communist Party (Bolsheviks) of Ukraine (CP(b)U). At the first convocation of the Verkhovna Rada those parties formed the parliamentary opposition People's Council. The most noticeable parties of the parliamentary opposition included the People's Movement of Ukraine (The Movement) and the Ukrainian Republican Party. Due to the August Putsch in Moscow (19–21 August 1991), a process to prohibit communist parties in Ukraine took place. Led by Oleksandr Moroz, the parliamentary faction of the CP(b)U, Group of 239, started a process to re-form the CP(b)U into the Socialist Party of Ukraine. The restriction on the existence of communist parties in Ukraine was successfully adopted soon after the Ukrainian independence, however in the couple of years the resolution was later challenged and eventually the restriction was lifted. In 1993 in Donetsk the first congress of the reinstated Communist Party of Ukraine took place, with the Party led by Petro Symonenko.

In the hastily organized 1994 parliamentary elections the communists surprisingly achieved the highest party rating, while the main opposing party, the Movement, did not gain even a quarter of their earned seats. The re-formed party of the CP(b)U, the Socialist Party of Ukraine, and its major ally, the Peasant Party of Ukraine, performed relatively strongly. About a third of the elected parliamentarians were not affiliated. The elections became a major fiasco of the Democratic forces in Ukraine. After the 1994 elections numerous independent political parties were elected to the Ukrainian parliament, leading to the formation of nine deputy groups and parliamentary factions: Communists, Socialists, Agrarians, Inter-regional Deputy Group (MDG), Unity, Center, Statehood, Reforms, and the Movement. The concept of a "situational majority" was first used during that convocation to form a parliamentary coalition. The ruling coalition in the parliament often included the Communist Party of Ukraine, the Socialist Party of Ukraine, Agrarians, MDG, and Unity.

=== Parties for oligarchs and clans (1994–2004) ===
During the Kuchma presidency (1994–2004) parties started to form around politicians who had achieved power; these parties were often a vehicle of Ukrainian oligarchs. Scholars defined several "Clans" in Ukrainian politics grouped around businessmen and politicians from particular Ukrainian mayor cities; the "Donetsk Clan" (Rinat Akhmetov, Viktor Yanukovych and Mykola Azarov), the "Dnipropetrovsk Clan" (Yulia Tymoshenko, Leonid Kuchma, Victor Pinchuk, Serhiy Tihipko and Pavlo Lazarenko), the "Kyiv Clan" (Viktor Medvedchuk and the Surkis brothers; this clan has also been linked to Zakarpattia) and the smaller "Kharkiv Clan".

After the 2002 elections the Ukrainian parliament saw some consolidation of democratic political parties and the establishment of the main political camps in Ukraine: a coalition of nationally oriented deputies with the pro-European vector, a coalition of left-wing parties, and the pro-Russian parties coalition of the former Soviet nomenklatura. A major change took place during the Orange revolution when finally the two opposing political camps were established after the left-wing coalition split.

=== Mergers and bans (2011–present) ===
On 17 November 2011 the Ukrainian Parliament approved an election law that banned the participation of blocs of political parties in parliamentary elections; since then several parties have merged with other parties. Strong Ukraine merged with the Party of Regions on 17 March 2012. Front of Changes and former Our Ukraine Bloc and Bloc Yulia Tymoshenko members performed in the 2012 parliamentary elections under "umbrella" party Fatherland. Front for Changes leader Yatsenyuk headed this election list; because Fatherland-leader Yulia Tymoshenko was imprisoned.

On 15 June 2013 Reforms and Order Party and Front for Change merged into Fatherland. A part of People’s Movement of Ukraine (including its former chairman Borys Tarasyuk) also merged with Fatherland (the rest of this party had merged with Ukrainian People's Party in May 2013).

In preparation for the upcoming 2014 parliamentary elections, several ministers of the Fatherland party in the government of Arseniy Yatsenyuk moved to the new party People's Front, which elected as its party leader Arseniy Yatsenyuk on 10 September 2014.

UDAR merged into the Petro Poroshenko Bloc on 28 August 2015 after in the 2014 parliamentary election, 30% of the Petro Poroshenko Bloc election list had been filled by members of UDAR (as non-partisan).

Following the Euromaidan, the Party of Regions chose not to participate in the new 2014 Ukrainian parliamentary election, and many of their members formed a new successor party called Opposition Bloc to compete on an anti-Maidan platform.

In summer 2018, there were negotiations between the parties "For Life" and Opposition Bloc on a potential merger. According to Ukrainska Pravda, this was supported by Serhiy Lyovochkin and Dmytro Firtash, who controlled one of the wings of Opposition Bloc, with Rinat Akhmetov controlling the other wing. In early November 2018, members of the Akhmetov wing decided to pause negotiations, while Opposition Bloc chairman Yuriy Boyko signed a cooperation agreement with "For Life" during the 2019 Ukrainian parliamentary election and presidential election. The same day, Opposition Bloc leading members Vadym Novynskyi and Borys Kolesnikov claimed the agreement was a "personal initiative" of Boyko and that the party had not taken any decisions on cooperation with For Life.

On 20 November 2018, Boyko and Serhiy Lyovochkin were excluded from the Opposition Bloc because they "betrayed our voters' interests" according to party co-chairman Oleksandr Vilkul. The Boyko faction then established the Opposition Platform — For Life party.

On 20 March 2022, President Volodymyr Zelenskyy announced a ban on 11 political parties for alleged ties with Russia: Opposition Platform — For Life, Party of Shariy, Nashi, Opposition Bloc, Left Opposition, Union of Left Forces, Derzhava, Progressive Socialist Party of Ukraine, Socialist Party of Ukraine, Socialists and Volodymyr Saldo Bloc.

Following the ban on pro-Russian parties, several regrouped into new ones: some from the 2019 Opposition Bloc regrouped into Ukraine is Our Home, while former members of Opposition Platform — For Life split into Platform for Life and Peace and Restoration of Ukraine.

On 20 June 2024, also Our Land party was banned with the accusation of the Security Service of Ukraine of subversive activities against State, bringing to 19 the number of banned parties since the beginning of the Russian invasion.

Participating parties
Election	Number	Threshold	Winners
1998	30	4%	8
2002	33	4%	6
2006	45	3%	5
2007	20	3%	5
2012	22	5%	5
2014	29	5%	6
2019	22	5%	5

== Political parties in Parliament ==
Seats won in parliamentary elections (since 1990, Chamber of Deputies or unicameral parliament)
Party	1990	1994	1998	2002	2006	2007	2012	2014	2019
Group of 239 (Communist Party of Ukraine, original)	239								
People's Movement of Ukraine (People's Council)	125	20	46	OU	OU	OU	–	–	–
Party of Democratic Revival of Ukraine (CPU Democratic Platform)	41	4							
Democratic Union (DU–DPU)				DU–DPU	–	–	–	–	–
Democratic Party of Ukraine (DPU–PEV, DU–DPU)	19	2	2	5	–	–	–	–	–
Party of Economic Revival (DPU–PEV)		1	DPU–PEV	–					
Communist Party of Ukraine		86	122	65	21	27	32		
Socialist Party of Ukraine (SPU–SelPU)		14	35	22	33	–	–	–	–
Peasant Party of Ukraine (SPU–SelPU)		19	SPU–SelPU	1	–	–	–	–	–
National Front (NF)			7						
Congress of Ukrainian Nationalists		5	NF	OU	OU	–	–	–	–
Ukrainian Conservative Republican Party		2	NF						
Ukrainian Republican Party	12	8	NF	BYT	–	–	–	–	–
Ukrainian National Assembly		1	–	1	–	–	–	–	–
Party of Labor (PP–LPU)		4	2						
Liberal Party of Ukraine (PP–LPU)		–	PP–LPU	OU	–	–	–	–	–
Social Democratic Party of Ukraine		2	75	–	–	–	–	–	–
Christian Democratic Party of Ukraine		1	2	–	–	–	–	–	–
Civil Congress of Ukraine (HKU–UPS)		2	1	–	–	–	–	–	–
Ukrainian Party of Justice (HKU–UPS)		–	HKU–UPS	BU	–	–	–	–	–
People's Democratic Party			27	Zayedu	–	–	–	–	–
Party of Greens of Ukraine		–	19	–	–	–	–	–	–
Hromada			23	–	–	–	–	–	–
Progressive Socialist Party of Ukraine			17	–	–	–	–	–	–
Social Democratic Party of Ukraine (united)			17	27	–	–	–	–	–
People's Party (Agrarian Party of Ukraine, Lytvyn)			7	Zayedu	–	20	2	–	–
Strong Ukraine				–	–	20	–	1	–
Reforms and Order Party (Our Ukraine)			4	OU	–	BYT	–		
Christian Democratic Union (CDU–UCDP)			3	OU	OU	OU	–	–	–
Ukrainian Christian Democratic Party (CDU–UCDP)	–	–	CDU–UCDP	–	–	–	–	–	–
Viche		–	1	–	–	–	–	–	–
Party of Regions (Party of Regional Revival of Ukraine)			2	Zayedu	186	175	185	–	–
All-Ukrainian Party of Workers	–	–	1	–	–	–	–	–	–
Union			1	–	–	–	1	–	–
Social-National Party of Ukraine (SNPU–DNU)		–	1	–	–	–	–	–	–
State Independence of Ukraine (SNPU–DNU)	–	–	SNPU–DNU	–					
Bloc "Our Ukraine" (OU)				112	81	72			
Youth Party of Ukraine				OU	–	–	–	–	–
Solidarity				OU	–	–	–	–	–
Forward, Ukraine!				OU	–	OU	–	–	–
Republican Christian Party				OU	–	–	–	–	–
Ukrainian People's Party				OU	–	OU	–	–	–
For United Ukraine! (Zayedu)				121					
Labour Ukraine				Zayedu	–	–	–	–	–
Party of Industrialists and Entrepreneurs of Ukraine				Zayedu	OU	–	–	–	–
Yulia Tymoshenko Bloc (BYT)				22	129	156			
Batkivshchyna				BYT	BYT	BYT	101	19	26
Ukrainian Platform "Sobor"				BYT	OU	OU	–	–	–
Ukraine – Forward!				BYT	BYT	BYT	–	–	–
Party of National Economic Development of Ukraine			–	1	–	–	–	–	–
Ukrainian Marine Party	–	–	–	1	–	–	–	–	–
Unity Bloc (BU)				4					
Unity				BU	–	–	–	–	–
Young Ukraine	–	–	–	BU	–	–	–	–	–
Social Democratic Union				BU	–	–	–	–	–
Our Ukraine					OU	OU	–	–	–
European Party of Ukraine						OU	–	–	–
Pora!					–	OU	–	–	–
Motherland Defenders Party				–	–	OU	–	–	–
Ukrainian Democratic Alliance for Reform (European Capital)					–	–	40	–	–
United Centre (Party of Private Property)				–	–	–	3	–	1
Radical Party of Oleh Lyashko (URDP)							1	22	–
Freedom			1	1		–	37	6	1
People's Front								82	–
European Solidarity								132	25
Self Reliance								33	1
Opposition Bloc								29	6
Spade (People's Initiative)							–	1	–
Will							–	1	–
Right Sector								1	–
Servant of the People									254
Opposition Platform — For Life									43
Voice									20
Independent	6	168	105	66			43	96	46

== See also ==
- Politics of Ukraine
- Liberalism in Ukraine
