= Interfactional Union "Eurooptimists" =

- Flag of the EU overlaid on a map of Ukraine
- Co-Coordinators: Olena Sotnyk; Alyona Shkrum; Oleksii Mushak
- Founded: February 3, 2015
- Dissolved: August 29, 2019
- Headquarters: Kyiv, Ukraine
- Ideology: Pro-Europeanism
- Seats in the Verkhovna Rada: 0 / 450

The Interfactional Union "Eurooptimists" (Ukrainian: Міжфракційне об'єднання "Єврооптимісти", Mizhfraktsiine ob’iednannia "Yevrooptymisty") was an association of people's deputies (members of parliament) of the 8th convocation (2014–2019) of the Verkhovna Rada, Ukraine's unicameral parliament. It was established in Kyiv on 3 February 2015. The inter-factional group was discontinued after the 2019 Ukrainian parliamentary election.

The group aimed to promote ties between Ukraine and the European Union by reaffirming the Ukrainian Eurointegration course, and by ensuring the effective implementation of the Ukraine–EU Association Agreement and the Deep and Comprehensive Free Trade Area.

In the autumn of 2015, attempts and negotiations started to form a political party around then Governor of Odesa Oblast Mikheil Saakashvili and members of the parliamentary group "Eurooptimists", Democratic Alliance and possibly Self Reliance this projection collapsed in June 2016. In August 2016 "Eurooptimists" Svitlana Zalishchuk, Serhiy Leshchenko and Mustafa Nayyem from the Petro Poroshenko Bloc joined to Democratic Alliance instead.

== Members ==
The Interfactional Union "Eurooptimists" consisted of 25 deputies (8 from the Petro Poroshenko Bloc, 2 from the People's Front, 6 from Self Reliance, and 5 from Fatherland and 4 non-affiliated):

- Oleksandr Chernenko (PPB)
- Dmytro Dobrodomov (Non-affiliated)
- Vladyslav Golub (Non-affiliated)
- Hanna Hopko (Non-affiliated)
- Nataliya Katser-Buchkovska (People's Front)
- Serhiy Kiral (Self Reliance)
- Ivan Krulko (Fatherland)
- Serhiy Leshchenko (PPB)
- Ihor Lutsenko (Fatherland)
- Yaroslav Markevych (Self Reliance)
- Oleksiy Mushak (PPB)
- Mustafa Nayyem (PPB)
- Taras Pastukh (Self Reliance)
- Viktoriya Ptashnyk (Non-affiliated)
- Anna Romanova (Self Reliance)
- Pavlo Rizanenko (PPB)
- Oleksiy Ryabchyn (Fatherland)
- Alyona Shkrum (Fatherland)
- Olena Sotnyk (Self Reliance)
- Andriy Vadaturskyi (PPB)
- Victoria Voytsitska (Self Reliance)
- Serhiy Yevtushok (Fatherland)
- Leonid Yemets (People's Front)
- Oksana Yurynets (PPB)
- Svitlana Zalishchuk (PPB)
