= List of ambassadors of Ukraine to Sweden =

Ambassador of Ukraine to Sweden

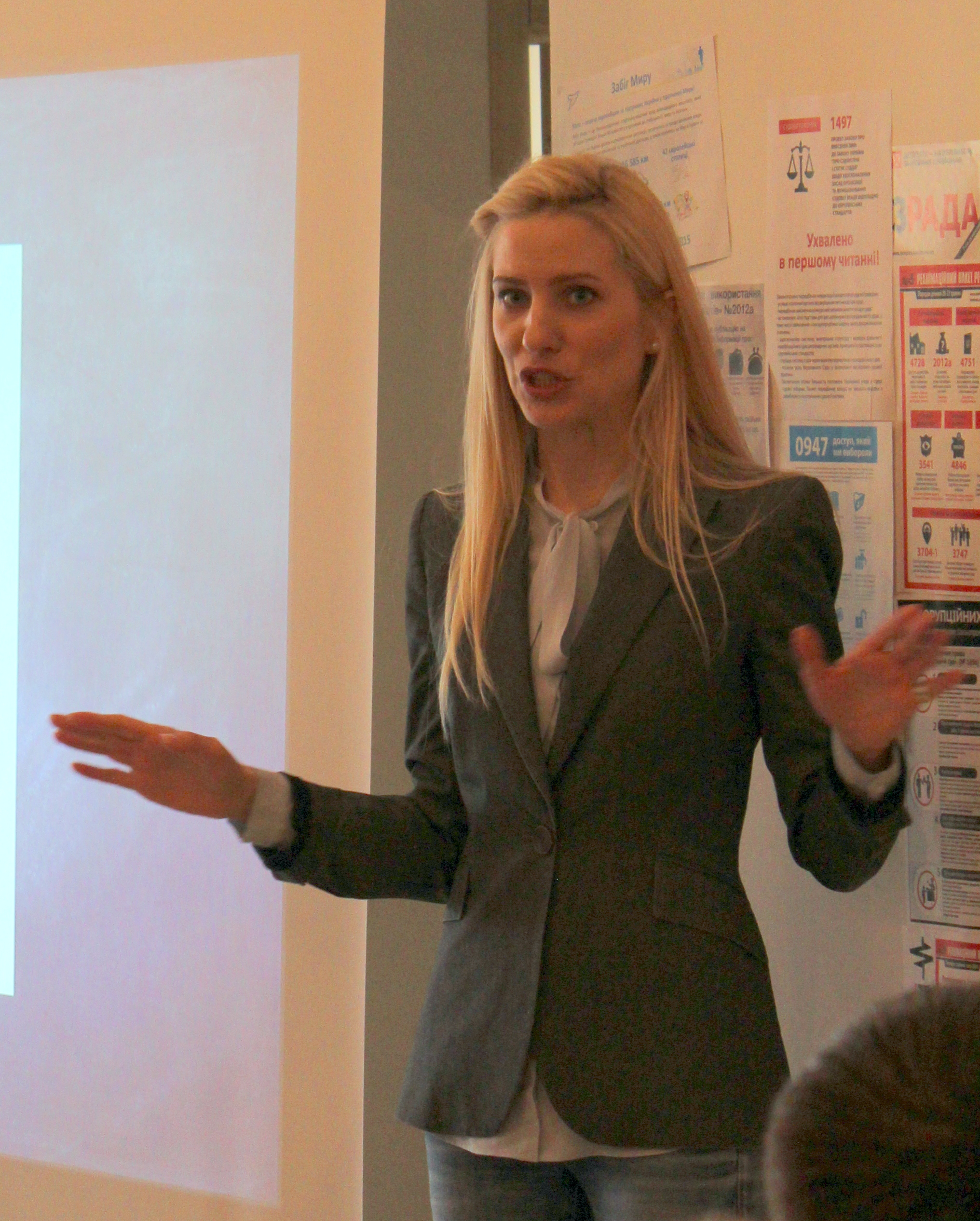
- Incumbent; Svitlana Zalishchuk since 2025
- Nominator: Volodymyr Zelenskyy
- Inaugural holder: Kostyantyn Masyk as Ambassador Extraordinary and Plenipotentiary
- Formation: October 16, 1992 (Presidential Ukase #501/92)
- Website: Ukraine Embassy - Stockholm

The Ambassador Extraordinary and Plenipotentiary of Ukraine to Sweden (Ukrainian: Надзвичайний і Повноважний посол України в Швеції) is the ambassador of Ukraine to the Kingdom of Sweden. The current ambassador is Svitlana Zalishchuk. She assumed the position in July 2025.

The first Ukrainian ambassador to the Kingdom of Sweden assumed his post in 1992, the same year a Ukrainian embassy opened in Stockholm.

== List of ambassadors ==
=== Cossack Hetmanate ===
- 1653–1653 – Syluyan Muzhylovsky (presumably)

=== Ukrainian People's Republic ===
- 1918–1918 – Borys Bazhenov
- 1919–1921 – Kostyantyn Losky

=== Ukraine ===
Name	Image	Appointed	Ending
Kostyantyn Masyk		16 October 1992	1994
Ihor Sahach		1994	1997
Ihor Podolyev		28 July 1997	1999
Oleksandr Slipchenko		20 January 1999	2002
Leonid Kozhara		14 November 2002	2004
Oleksandr Danyleiko		2004	2004
Eduard Terpytsky		2004	2006
Anatoliy Ponomarenko		6 December 2006	20 May 2008 (died in office)
Yevhen Perebyinis		2008	2011
Valeriy Stepanov		11 November 2011	2015
Ihor Sahach		19 March 2015	14 June 2019
Andrii Plakhotniuk		21 September 2020	21 July 2025
Svitlana Zalishchuk		28 July 2025	Incumbent
