= Mykola Halushko =

Ukrainian politician

- Микола Галушко
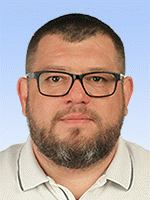
- Official portrait, 2019

People's Deputy of Ukraine
- Incumbent
- Assumed office 29 August 2019
- Preceded by: Pavlo Rizanenko
- Constituency: Kyiv Oblast, No. 97

Personal details
- Born: 5 December 1979 (age 46) Argayash, Chelyabinsk Oblast, Russian SFSR, Soviet Union (now Russia)
- Party: Independent
- Other political affiliations: Servant of the People (2019–2020)
- Education: National Academy of Internal Affairs; Kyiv National University of Trade and Economics

Mykola Leonidovych Halushko (Ukrainian: Микола Леонідович Галушко; born 5 December 1979) is a Ukrainian politician currently serving as a People's Deputy of Ukraine since 2019 from Ukraine's 97th electoral district, located in Kyiv Oblast. He is a member of Servant of the People.

== Early life and career ==
Mykola Leonidovych Halushko was born on 5 December 1979 in the village of Argayash, in the Chelyabinsk Oblast of the Russian Soviet Federative Socialist Republic. He graduated from the National Academy of Internal Affairs with a specialisation in jurisprudence, and from the Kyiv National University of Trade and Economics with a specialisation in economics.

From 1997 to 2006, Halushko was an employee of the Ministry of Internal Affairs. Following this, he became executive director of Halid PP, a private security company, where he worked until 2012. He rejoined the company in 2017 as its director, and also worked as an adviser to the director of Ukrspryt, Ukraine's state alcohol company, from that year.

== Political career ==
In the 2019 Ukrainian presidential election, Halushko was the head of Volodymyr Zelenskyy's campaign in Ukraine's 97th electoral district, located in Kyiv Oblast. In the 2019 Ukrainian parliamentary election four months later, Halushko was the candidate of Servant of the People, Zelenskyy's party, in the 97th electoral district. At the time of the election, he was an independent. He ultimately won with 37.75% of the vote, defeating European Solidarity candidate Oleh Ivanenko and incumbent Holos candidate Pavlo Rizanenko, who gathered 16.00% and 9.81% of the vote, respectively.

On 29 August 2019, Halushko was formally inaugurated as a People's Deputy of Ukraine. He joined the Verkhovna Rada Human Rights Committee, and became a member of Servant of the People in November 2019. Halushko later left Servant of the People in September 2020, claiming that all seats in his electoral district had been sold and the party was insufficiently committed to fighting corruption, though he has remained a member of the party's fraction in the Verkhovna Rada (Ukrainian parliament).

== Controversies ==
=== Traffic police incident ===
In December 2021, Ukrainska Pravda released body camera footage from a police officer who had pulled over Halushko for violating traffic rules in Kyiv. The footage, which dated to a year before its release, showed Halushko insulting the police officer for pulling him over, referring to the police force as "morons" and asking "How can you pull over the car of a People's Deputy?"

The press service of Servant of the People defended Halushko following the incident, claiming that former Minister of Internal Affairs Arsen Avakov had leaked the video in response to Halushko voting for his removal. Davyd Arakhamia, head of Servant of the People in the Verkhovna Rada, further claimed that the entire incident may have been engineered by Avakov in response to the vote.

=== Accusations of corruption and absenteeism ===
On 19 November 2021, the National Agency on Corruption Prevention summoned Halushko, accusing him of understating the money in his financial declaration by ₴1.45 million (approximately US$38,988), comprising donations he had made to his parliamentary election campaign and a land plot in the village of Hoholiv.

The anti-corruption non-governmental organisation Chesno has additionally accused Halushko of collecting pay without working, noting that between January 2022 and May 2023, he missed 46% of sessions of the Verkhovna Rada.
