= Vasyl Tsushko =

Ukrainian politician

- Василь Цушко
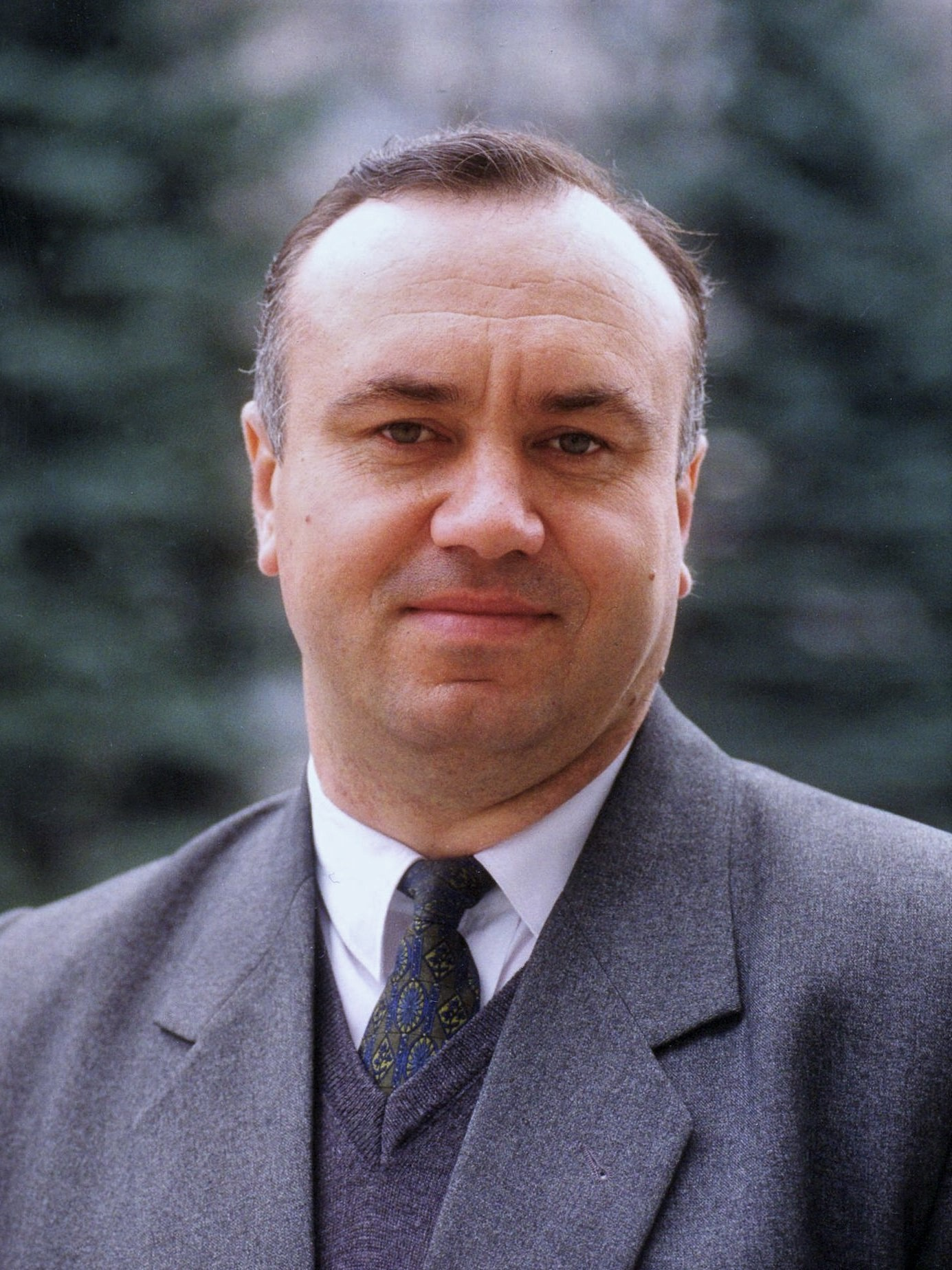

3rd Governor of Odesa Oblast
- In office 3 February 2005 – 2006
- President: Viktor Yushchenko
- Prime Minister: Yulia Tymoshenko; Yuriy Yekhanurov; Viktor Yanukovych
- Preceded by: Serhiy Hrynevetskyi
- Succeeded by: Borys Zvyahintsev (acting)

Minister of Economics
- In office March 11, 2010 – December 10, 2010
- Preceded by: Bohdan Danylyshyn
- Succeeded by: Post dismissed

Minister of Internal Affairs of Ukraine
- In office December 1, 2006 – December 18, 2007
- Preceded by: Yuriy Lutsenko
- Succeeded by: Yuriy Lutsenko

Personal details
- Born: February 1, 1963 (age 63) Nadrichne, Tarutyne Raion, Odesa Oblast, Ukrainian SSR, Soviet Union
- Party: Socialist Party of Ukraine; Socialists
- Relations: Son and daughter
- Occupation: Politician

Vasyl Petrovych Tsushko (Ukrainian: Василь Петрович Цушко; born 1 February 1963) is a Ukrainian politician, former Minister of Internal Affairs of Ukraine (2006-2007), and former Head of the Antimonopoly Committee of Ukraine (2010-2014).

From July 2010 to August 2011 he was the party leader of the Socialist Party of Ukraine.

== Biography ==
Vasyl Tsushko was born in the Nadrichne village, Odesa Oblast in the Ukrainian SSR (now Ukraine); he is of mixed Ukrainian-Moldovan ancestry and is fluent in Romanian. In 1982, Tsushko finished the Izmail Vocational school of Mechanics and Electronics of Agriculture. From 1983–1985, Tsushko served in the Soviet Army. After completing the 2 years army course, he went on to study at the economic faculty at the Odesa Agriculture Institute, from which he graduated in 1988.

From 1986–1998, Tsushko was the head of two collective farms. From 1994–2002, Vasyl Tsushko served as a national deputy of the second, third, and fourth convocations of the Verkhovna Rada (Ukrainian parliament). In 2005, he graduated from the National University of the Ministry of Internal Affairs, with the qualification of a lawyer. From May 1997, he was a member of the Socialist Party of Ukraine and the first Vice-president of the Committee of Bank and Financing of Ukraine. He was chosen as the head of the Odesa Oblast Government Administration on February 3, 2005.

Tsushko was chosen as the Minister of Internal Affairs on December 1, 2006, after his predecessor Yuriy Lutsenko was dismissed by the parliament. On May 26, 2007, Tsushko suffered from a heart attack and was later hospitalized in critical condition. According to medical results, he suffered from an overdose of methylxanthine. After worsening health, he was later flown to a hospital in Germany. A Ukrainian advocate Tetyana Montyan, stated that his heart attack was a result of poisoning. The Interfax news agency reports that Vasyl Tsushko's condition deteriorated while in the medical clinic in Germany. On September 30, 2007, Tsushko announced that he would resign as Minister of Internal Affairs of Ukraine, due to the need for his health rehabilitation.

On July 24, 2010, Tsushko took over Socialist Party leadership from Oleksandr Moroz

Tsushko headed the Ukrainian Economy Ministry from March to December 2010 and was appointed as head of the Antimonopoly Committee of Ukraine on December 14, 2010. Worked as a Head of the Antimonopoly Committee till 26 March 2014.

Tsushko ran as a presidential candidate in the 2014 Ukrainian presidential election. In the election he got 10 434 votes (0.06% of the total vote); making him the second to last most unsuccessful candidate of the election.

Tsushko is married and has a son and daughter. He is interested in historical literature.

== References and footnotes ==
=== References ===
- "Tsushko Vasyl Petrovych" (in Ukrainian). dovidka.com.ua.

Political offices
Preceded by Yuriy Lutsenko	Minister of Internal Affairs; 2006–2007	Succeeded by Yuriy Lutsenko
