= Svitlana Zalishchuk =

Ukrainian politician, journalist, and human rights activist

- Світлана Заліщук
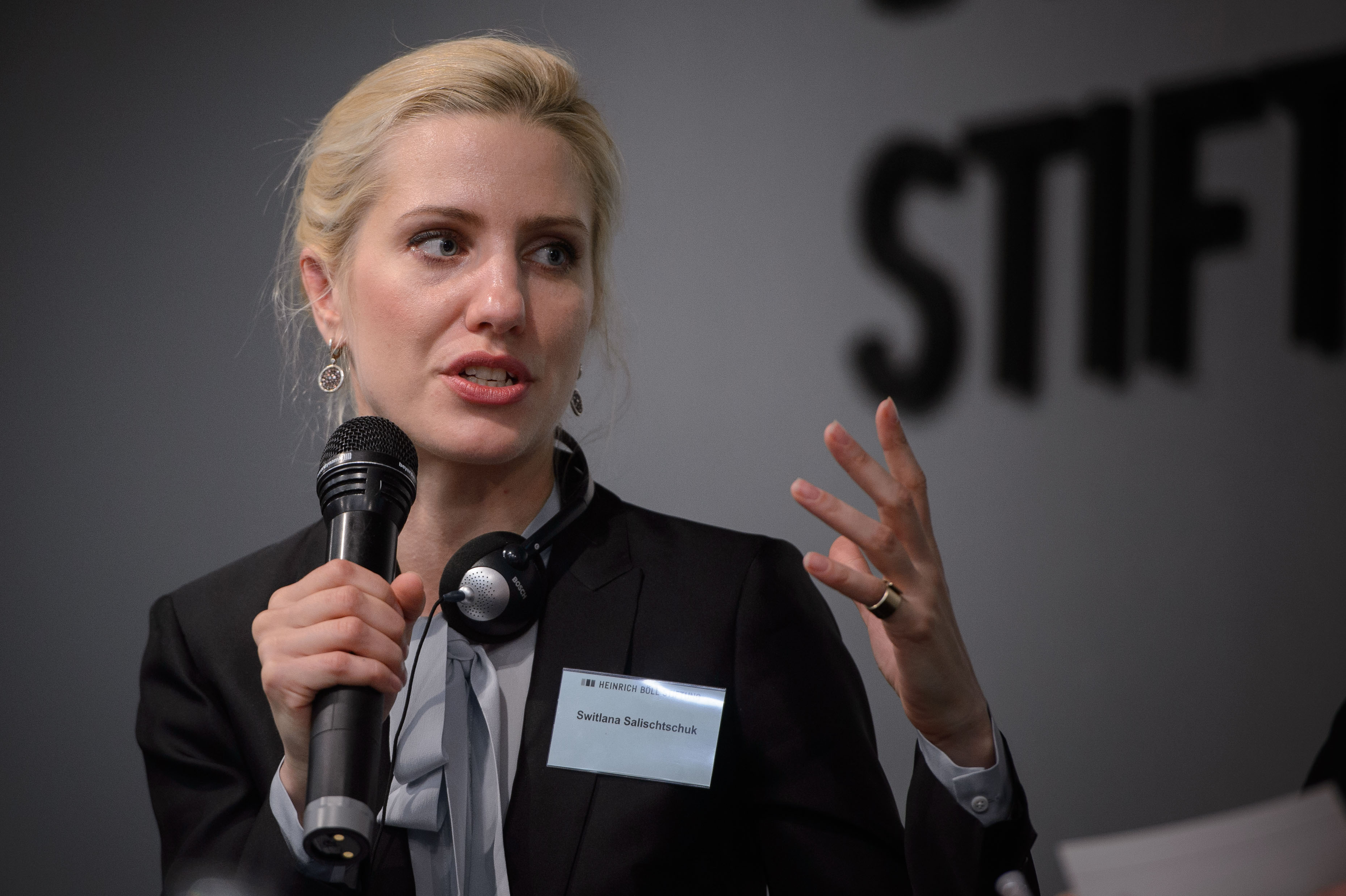

Ambassador of Ukraine to Sweden
- Incumbent
- Assumed office 28 July 2025
- President: Volodymyr Zelenskyy
- Preceded by: Andrii Plakhotniuk

People's Deputy of Ukraine
- In office 27 November 2014 – 24 July 2019

Personal details
- Born: 24 October 1982 (age 44) Zhashkiv, Cherkasy Oblast, Ukrainian SSR, Soviet Union
- Party: Democratic Alliance
- Other political affiliations: Petro Poroshenko Bloc (until August 2016)
- Spouse: Wayne Jordash

Svitlana Petrivna Zalishchuk (Ukrainian: Світлана Петрівна Заліщук, born on October 24, 1982 in Zhashkiv, Ukrainian SSR) is a Ukrainian politician, public leader, journalist, human rights campaigner and former member of the Ukrainian Parliament (member of the Committee for Foreign Affairs).

In the 2019 Ukrainian parliamentary election, Zalishchuk lost reelection as an independent candidate in a single-seat constituency in Cherkasy Oblast. After the election she became a foreign policy adviser to Prime Minister Oleksiy Honcharuk. On 4 March 2020 Denys Shmyhal replaced Honcharuk as Prime Minister but did not retain Zalishchuk as advisor.

== Education ==
Taras Shevchenko National University of Kyiv, Institute of Journalism:

- Honours Master's degree in Journalism, 2004–2006
- Honours Bachelor's degree in Journalism, 1999–2004
- Awarded John Smith Fellowship Programme, June–July 2008 (including study of the functioning of the democratic institutions, meetings at 10 Downing Street, BBC in Glasgow and London, MPs offices, etc.)
- Awarded Stanford, Draper Hills Summer Fellowship, USA, July–August 2011 (focus on Democracy and Rule of Law)

== Politics ==
Zalishchuk was a Member of Parliament (Verkhovna Rada) in Ukraine, November 2014 – July 2019. She was placed on 18th position on the party list of Petro Poroshenko Bloc, Zalishchuk was elected to the 8th Ukrainian Verkhovna Rada during the 2014 parliamentary election. Gradually she began to criticize the Petro Poroshenko Bloc (PPB) more and more and stopped voting in sync with it. According to deputy head of the PPB faction Oleksiy Honcharenko by February 2019 Zalishchuk had not attended PPB faction meetings for several years.

Svitlana Zalishchuk's focus of parliamentary activity includes strategic lobbying and organizing national and global campaigns on democratization, security, anticorruption, human rights, antidiscrimination, particularly gender and LGBT equality. She is the co-author of more than 30 draft laws on these issues. In 2015 Svitlana Zalishchuk was one of the first two MPs in Ukraine who publicly joined LGBT pride, along with Serhiy Leshchenko.

Svitlana Zalishchuk is a member of the Committee on Foreign Affairs and the Chair of the Sub-Committee on European and Euro-Atlantic Integration.

Zalishchuk is the co-chair of the Parliamentary Friendship group between Ukraine and United Kingdom and a member of the Parliamentary Friendship groups between Ukraine – Norway and Ukraine – Georgia.

Member of the Parliamentary Caucus "Equal Opportunities" devoted to gender issues. Zalishchuk is a co-founder and member of the Inter-faction Interfactional Union "Eurooptimists" and ‘Anticorruption Platform’ and the founder of the Open Parliament platform in Ukraine as a part of the Open Government Partnership.

Zalishchuk has been actively involved in representing Ukraine on different international platforms, including UN, CoE, EU Parliament, etc.

As Ukrainian political leader, regular commentator in international media including the New York Times, Le Monde, Bild, Le Temps, Tages Anzeiger, Open Democracy, etc.

Member of the Parliamentary Assembly of Council of Europe (PACE), January 2015-January 2017.

- Campaigning for Resolutions on behalf of Ukraine, particularly concerning human rights protection
- Member of the Committee on Antidiscrimination and Equality
- Substitute Member of the Committee on Culture, Science, Education and Media

Member of the joint Ukraine-EU Parliamentary Committee on Association Agreement between Ukraine and European Union, January 2015 - January 2017.

Member of the Steering Committee of the World Movement for Democracy, founded by National Endowment for Democracy (Washington DC), (July 2014 – present).

In August 2016 she, Serhiy Leshchenko and Mustafa Nayyem (also) from the Petro Poroshenko Bloc joined to Democratic Alliance. From Autumn 2015 until June 2016 they had been part of an attempt to form a political party around then Governor of Odesa Oblast Mikheil Saakashvili with members of the parliamentary group Interfactional Union "Eurooptimists", Democratic Alliance and possibly Self Reliance until this projection collapsed in June 2016.

On 28 February 2019 Zalishchuk voluntarily left the Petro Poroshenko Bloc faction.

On 7 June 2019 Zalishchuk stated she wanted to take part in the July 2019 Ukrainian parliamentary election as an independent candidate in a constituency. In the election she lost reelection as an independent candidate in a single-seat constituency in Cherkasy Oblast. In constituency 199 she gained 3rd place with 7.33% of the votes. The constituency was won by Serhiy Nahorniak (uk) of the Servant of the People party with 36.59% of the votes.

== Human rights campaigning ==
As an Executive Director of ‘Centre UA’, she coordinated an influential Facebook page for Euromaidan. Co-founder and Executive Director of the Kyiv-based 'Centre of United Actions' NGO.

Focused on media and anticorruption reforms, 2009-2014

- Designed and implemented more than 30 nationwide projects, involving hundreds of civil society organizations, supported by international donors including USAID, PACT, MATRA (Netherlands Embassy), CIDA (Canadian Embassy), SIDA (Swedish Embassy), Omidyar Network, Open Society Foundation, etc. Campaigns included access to information, independent public broadcasting, and freedom of expression.
- Building multimedia content and platforms to engage multiple stakeholders, including government, media, civil society, and international partners.

Co-founder and member of the Reanimation Package of Reforms (RPR) civic platform

That after the 2014 Revolution of Dignity united more than 50 NGOs and several hundreds experts and activists for building and promotion of democratic reforms in Ukraine. Dozens of the reformist draft laws elaborated by RPR were adopted by the parliament in 2014.

Co-founder and coordinator of Chesno movement. It united various NGOs across Ukraine, aimed at imposing anticorruption and integrity processes upon the public sector, including Ukrainian parliamentarians and public servants. Examples included legislative reform to ensure the integrity of the voting in the Parliament and also electronic declarations of assets for public servants, 2011–2014.

Co-founder and member of the influential journalist movement Stop Censorship!

== Government ==
Press-officer to the Deputy Prime Minister on European Integration in Ukraine, July–September 2005. Led communication team of the office in the Ukrainian Government of the Deputy Prime-Minister on European Integration after Orange Revolution, when Ukraine started its integration processes with EU: tasks included media planning, preparation of briefings, information requests and interviews, coordination with journalists.

Spokesperson to the Chief of Staff of the President of Ukraine and Head of the Department of Information in the Main Information Service in the Administration of the President of Ukraine, September 2005-October 2006

- Secretary of the National Council on Freedom of Speech under the President of Ukraine
- Management of the communications of the Administration of the President with media and civil society, organization weekly briefings with press corps
- Focus on establishment of the new framework of transparency and accountability in Presidential office after the Orange Revolution, e.g. media access, press-conferences, interactive communication with media

Deputy Chief of Staff to the Advisor of the President on European and Euro-Atlantic integration, 2006-2009

- Promotion of Ukraine's NATO Membership Action Plan in EU countries
- Media campaign in Ukraine to increase public support of NATO integration
- Working on EU integration policies
- Cooperation with MPs and representatives of Governments, NGOs and media in US, UK, Netherlands, France, Germany, etc.

== Journalism ==
- Anchor of live political TV-show on TVi TV-Channel: “From the other side”
- Devoted to parliamentary elections in Ukraine, September–October 2012
- International reporter at the ‘Fifth TV-Channel’, Ukraine, 2003–2005
- The only independent TV-Channel during Orange Revolution. In 2004, journalists initiated nationwide journalist movement against censorship.
- Journalist for the First National Radio Channel in Ukraine, 2003
- Creation and management of the first national student magazine of the Institute of Journalism, Ukraine

Media reports:

- Freelance journalist, 2009–present for various Ukrainian media and social media, including newsprint; Novoe Vriemia, Ukrainska Pravda, Delovaya Stolitsa Volunteer magazine
- Editor-in-Chief of the National student Magazine ‘World of Communication’, 2001–2003

== Lectures and presentations ==
Expert lecturer and featured speaker, 2009 – present

- Lectures at the Taras Shevchenko National University of Kyiv, Institute of Journalism
- Lectures internationally, including in the US (e.g., George Washington University), throughout Europe (e.g., Oxford, Free University of Berlin, Humboldt University, Potsdam University, Vilnius University, etc.)
- Training of local and international NGOs in Ukraine on capacity and influence of the civil society on decision-making
- Keynote speaker, moderator and speaker at various international and regional forums (including UN, CoE, EU Parliament, Munich Security Conference, etc. devoted to foreign policy, security and democracy

== Personal honours ==
- Recognized as one of the emerging leaders of Ukraine in 2013 by Washington-based, US-Ukraine Foundation in Project ‘40 under 40 Ukrainians’
- Recognized as one of the top-100 most influential women in Ukraine by Focus Magazine and Novoe Vriemia Magazine in 2015, 2016 2016 and 2017.
- Named as a 'bravest' women of the Munich Security Conference by German Bild newspaper in 2016

Awarded Anna Lindh Prize 2016, (after former Minister for Foreign Affairs, Sweden), international award for human rights defenders: a woman or young person with "the courage to fight indifference, prejudice, oppression and injustices in order to promote a good life for all people in an environment marked by respect for human rights" (previous winners include Amira Hass and Madeleine Albright).

== Personal life ==
On July 21, 2018, Svitlana Zalishchuk married the British lawyer (QC) Wayne Jordash.

== Selected speeches and publications ==
1. Svitlana Zalishchuk: Break-neck speed budget, Kyiv Post (December 29, 2014)
2. Poroshenko will have to deliver, Kyiv Post (May 29, 2014)
3. Svitlana Zalischuk | PDF Poland-CEE 2014, personaldemocracy.com (Warsaw: March 13, 2014)
4. From iPhone to iDemocracy: Lessons from Ukraine, personaldemocracy.com (NYC: June 7, 2013)
5. Svitlana Zalishchuk | Changing Roles of the Civil Society, personaldemocracy.com (Warsaw: February 1, 2013)
6. From Maidan Square to the European Parliament: Public hearing on Ukraine with members of Ukrainian opposition, greenmediabox.eu (December 11, 2013)
7. Kiev Must Launch Reforms, The Moscow Times (May 28, 2014)
8. La parlementaire Svitlana Zalishchuk évoque la crise politique qui secoue l'Ukraine (in French), Radio Télévision Suisse (February 2016)
9. L’Ukraine ne tolère plus la corruption, voilà le vrai changement (in French), Le Temps (24 février 2016)
10. Putin hat es in der Hand, den Konflikt zu beenden (in German), Tages Anzeiger (March 5, 2016)
11. Has Ukraine's 'Revolution of Dignity' left women behind?, opendemocracy.net (October 26, 2015)
12. Ukrainian Nationalists Post Photo Album Threatening LGBT Activists, BuzzFeed News (June 9, 2015)
13. Parliamentary Elections Show Political Turmoil Is Continuing in Ukraine, New York Times (October 25, 2014)
14. Election of President Seen as a Beginning to Repairing Ukraine, New York Times (May 24, 2014)
15. Ukraine: l'émergence de la "génération Maïdan" aux législatives (in French), Le Point (23 octobre 2014)
16. La nouvelle bataille de Kiev (in French), Le Monde (4 April 2015)
17. Le report de l'accord entre Kiev et l'UE déclenche une tempête (in French), Tribune de Geneve (15 septembre 2014)
18. Génération Maïdan (in French), Le Monde (11 April 2014)
