= Andrii Plakhotniuk =

Ukraine's ambassador to Canada since 2025

- Андрій Плахотнюк
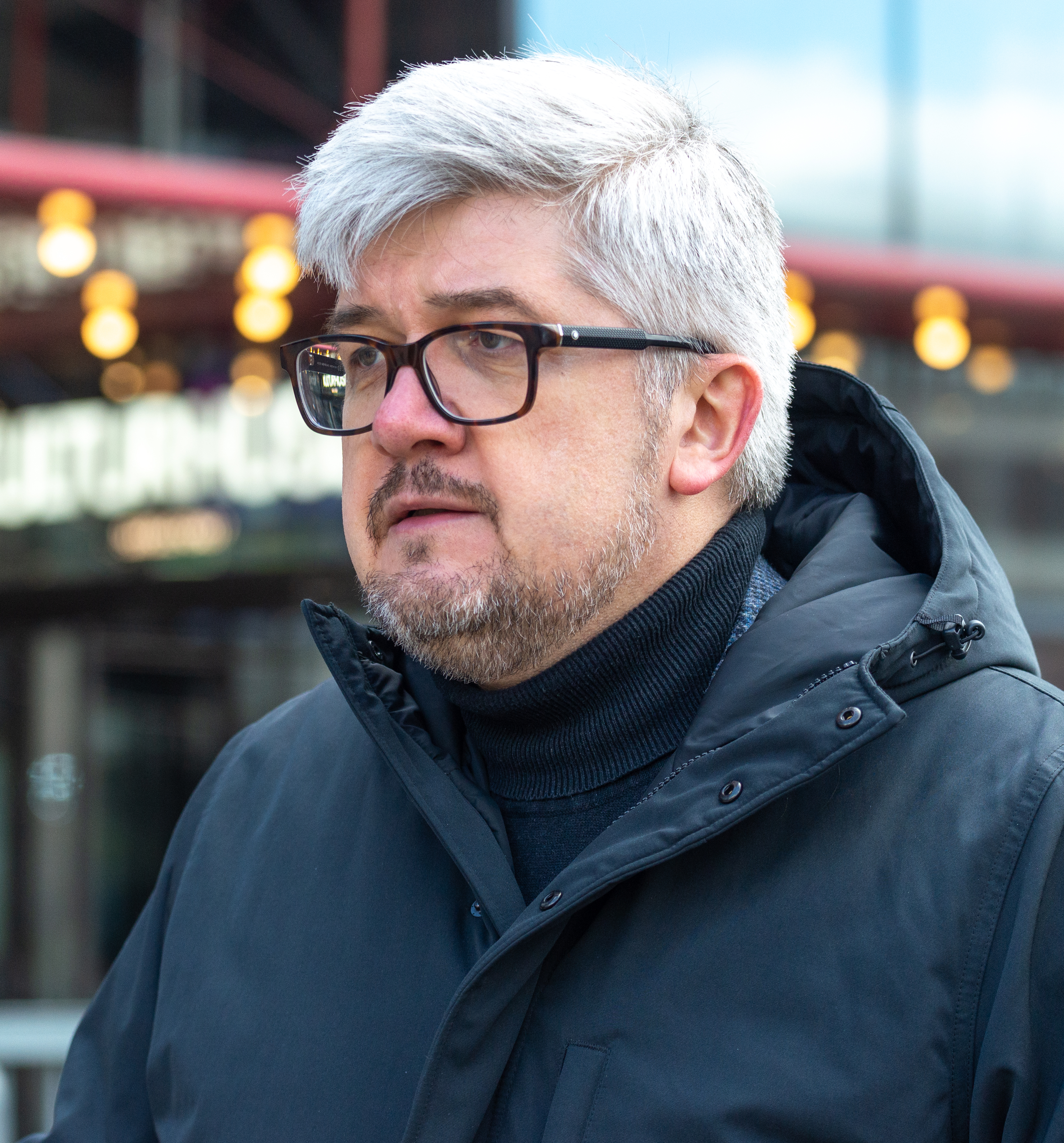
- Plakhotniuk in 2022

Ambassador of Ukraine to Canada
- Incumbent
- Assumed office 25 September 2025
- President: Volodymyr Zelenskyy
- Preceded by: Yulia Kovaliv

Ambassador of Ukraine to Sweden
- In office 21 September 2020 – 21 July 2025
- President: Volodymyr Zelenskyy
- Preceded by: Ihor Sahach
- Succeeded by: Svitlana Zalishchuk

Personal details
- Born: 1 August 1975 (age 51) Kharkiv, Ukrainian SSR, Soviet Union

Andrii Mykholayovych Plakhotniuk (Ukrainian: Андрій Миколайович Плахотнюк; born 1 August 1975), is a Ukrainian diplomat, former ambassador of Ukraine to Sweden, and Ukraine's current ambassador to Canada since 2025.

== Biography ==
Andrii Mykholayovych Plakhotniuk was born on 1 August 1975 in Kharkiv, then in the Ukrainian Soviet Socialist Republic. In 1997, he graduated from the Institute of Oriental Studies and International Relations "Kharkiv College". He speaks English, Russian, Chinese and Japanese.

Since 1997, he has been in diplomatic service at the Ministry of Foreign Affairs of Ukraine. Plachotniuk headed the Foreign Ministry's Department of Russian Threats, and previously worked as a counselor at the Ukrainian Embassy in China. Director of the Sixth Territorial Department of the Ministry of Foreign Affairs of Ukraine. He was responsible for the Minsk talks on behalf of the Ministry of Foreign Affairs of Ukraine.

Since 21 September 2020, Andrii Plakhotniuk is Ukraine's ambassador extraordinary and plenipotentiary in Sweden. Plakhotniuk's time in office has been largely marked by Russia's invasion of Ukraine in 2022. In July 2022, he received the Order of the Polar Star from Foreign Minister Ann Linde following the decision of King Carl XVI Gustaf of Sweden on the proposal of the Ministry of Foreign Affairs for his work in nurturing Swedish-Ukrainian relations.

== Honours ==
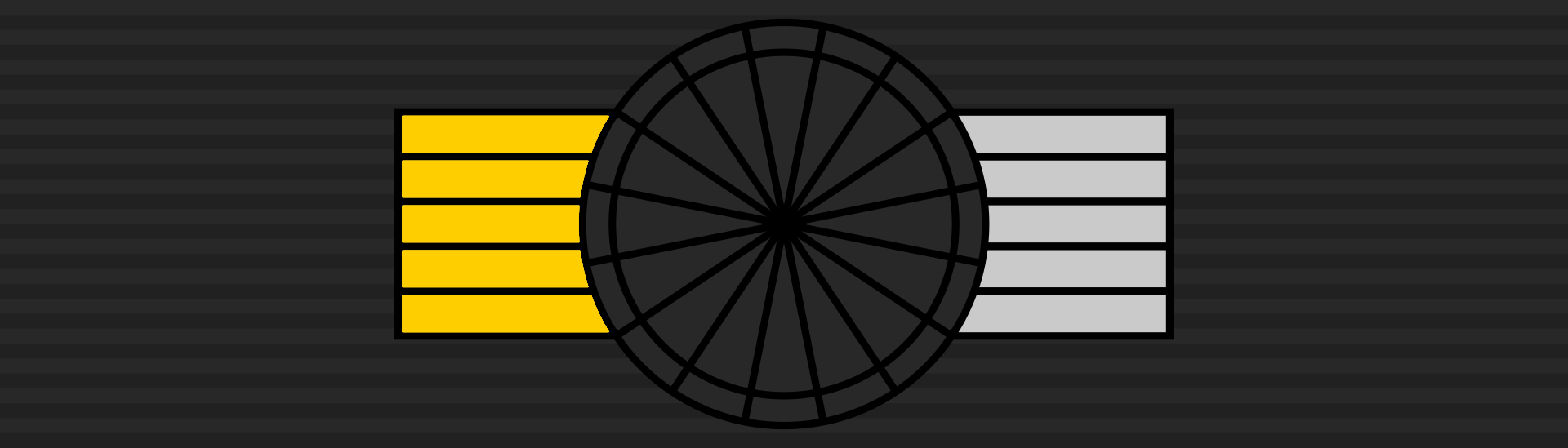
- (Sweden) Commander 1st Class of the Royal Order of the Polar Star, 6 July 2022
- (Ukraine) Recipient of the Ukrainian Order of Merit 3rd Class, 22 December 2021
