= Democratic Alliance (Ukraine) =

Democratic Alliance Демократичний альянс Демократический альянс
- Leader: Nikita Murenko and Alexander Kuchinsky (co-chair)
- Founded: 2011
- Headquarters: Kyiv
- Ideology: Christian democracy
- Political position: Centre-right
- European affiliation: Youth of the European People's Party
- Verkhovna Rada: 0 / 450
- Regions (2015): 25 / 158,399

Website
- http://www.dem-alliance.org/

Democratic Alliance (Ukrainian: Демократичний альянс, romanized: Demokratychnyi alians, Russian: Демократический альянс) is a pro-European political party in Ukraine, registered in September 2011, formed on a basis of an anti-corruption platform and Young Christian Democrats of Ukraine NGO.

== History ==
Before becoming a political party, Democratic Alliance was a youth organization. The objective of the organization was "to form a new Christian-democratic, responsible, patriotic-oriented social and political elite of the country through the creation of conditions for the development, improvement and implementation of youth".

The party has organized protests against corruption and fraud and it took part in the Euromaidan protests. Because of its involvement in various protests the party claimed that in May 2012 the Ukrainian Ministry of Justice attempted to eliminate its registration as a legal political party. Members of the party have been arrested while taking part in protests. Two party members were shot dead by Ukrainian security forces while participating in the deadly Euromaidan protests of February 2014.

The party did not participate in the 2012 parliamentary elections. During the Euromaidan protest movement, the party played an active role.

In early June 2014, the Democratic Alliance denied membership to LGBT activist Bohdan Globa because the party did not believe he shared the view "that family is made up of a man and a woman" with the party.

Early September 2014, it was established that the party would participate in the 2014 parliamentary election on the partly list of Civil Position. For elections in single mandate constituencies, both parties participated separately. In the election this combined party list failed to clear the 5% election threshold (it got 3.1% of the votes) and also both parties did not win a constituency seat and thus (both) no parliamentary seats. In the 2014 Kyiv local election of the same day, Democratic Alliance won 2 council seats.

In the 2015 Kyiv local election the party lost its seats in the Kyiv City Council (it scored 4.56% of the vote). The party won 25 seats in the (other) 2015 Ukrainian local elections. In this election it did relatively well in the Donbas.

In August 2016 high-profile Ukrainian MPs Svitlana Zalishchuk, Serhiy Leshchenko and Mustafa Nayyem from the Petro Poroshenko Bloc joined to Democratic Alliance. From Autumn 2015 until June 2016 they and the leadership of Democratic Alliance had been part of an attempt to form a political party around then Governor of Odesa Oblast Mikheil Saakashvili with members of the parliamentary group Interfactional Union "Eurooptimists", Democratic Alliance and possibly Self Reliance until this projection collapsed in June 2016.

On 9 October 2018, Democratic Alliance and Self Reliance announced they would support Lviv Mayor Andriy Sadovyi as their joint candidate in the 2019 Ukrainian presidential election. On 1 March 2019 Sadovyi decided to withdraw from the election to support the candidacy of Anatoliy Hrytsenko. (Hrytsenko did not proceed to the second round of the election; in the first round he placed fifth with 6.91% of the votes.)

Democratic Alliance did not participate in the 2019 Ukrainian parliamentary election.

In the 2020 Ukrainian local elections the party nominated 155 candidates, but none won a seat.

== Political positions ==
According to party leader Vasyl Gatsko "Democratic Alliance is a Christian Democratic party".

Democratic Alliance's platform calls for democracy and social justice, and for a society "based on human values, upholding the priority of human rights and freedoms".

The party is pro-European and anti-corruption. The party wants to improve Ukrainian democracy, make laws that ensure that police and prosecutors enforce the law fairly and change public opinion in south and eastern Ukraine.

The party opposes same-sex marriages as Gatsko explained "Our position is that family is made up of a man and a woman".

The party is popular among young voters.

== See also ==
- Category:Democratic Alliance (Ukraine) politicians
