= Oleksiy Ryabchyn =

Ukrainian politician, scientist, and journalist

Oleksii Mykhailovych Riabchyn
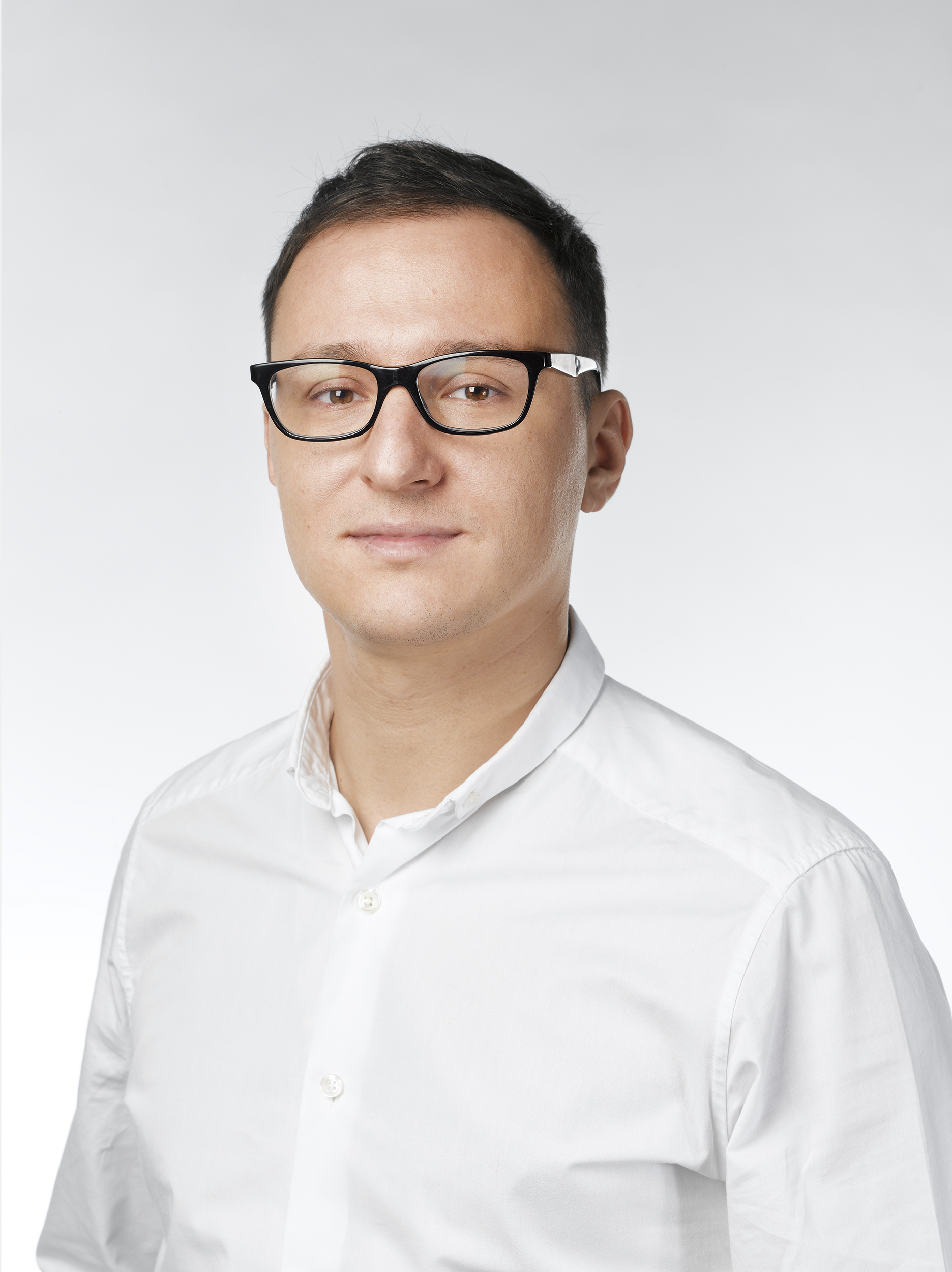

People's Deputy of Ukraine
- In office 27 November 2014 – 24 July 2019

Deputy Minister for Energy and Environmental Protection of Ukraine
- In office 12 October 2019 – 27 May 2020

Personal details
- Born: 22 April 1983 (age 43) Mariupol, Ukrainian SSR, Soviet Union (now Ukraine)
- Education: Donetsk National University

Oleksii Mykhailovych Riabchyn (Ukrainian: Олексій Михайлович Рябчин; born 22 April 1983) is a Ukrainian energy and climate professional with a successful career in green business, policy and politics.

Currently doing private green consultancy and works as Strategic Advisor to Deputy Prime-Minister for European and Euro-Atlantic Integration of Ukraine Olga Stefanishyna.

Riabchyn worked as Low Carbon Business Development Advisor to CEO of Naftogaz of Ukraine Yurii Vitrenko in 2021-22. He served as Deputy Minister for Energy and Environmental Protection of Ukraine responsible for the energy-efficiency sector in 2019–2020. Was elected as a Member of Parliament of Ukraine in 2014-19.

== Education and personal life ==
Riabchyn has a MSc with Distinction in Innovation and Sustainability for International Development from the SPRU University of Sussex and has worked as an assistant professor at Donetsk National University. He relocated from Donetsk to Kyiv in May 2014 as a result of the war in Donbass. His mother is of Russian origin.

From 2000 to 2010, Riabchyn attended Donetsk National University, where he attained a BA in International Economics with honors, a MA in International Economics with Honors, and a PhD in International Economics.

From 2012 to 2013 he attended the Science and Technology Policy Research school at the University of Sussex, where he attained a MSc with Distinction in Innovation and Sustainability for International Development.

In 2014 he attended the Ukrainian School of Political Studies.

In 2017 he took an Executive Course on Oil, Gas and Mining Governance at the University of Oxford.

In 2018 he took Responsible Leadership seminar at the Aspen Institute in Kyiv.

=== Professional Experience ===
2002 - 2004, Volunteer, Project manager at NGO - Regional Development Agency "Donbas", Ukraine. Was responsible for the implementation of economic restructuration program of depressed cities in Donbas.

2006 - 2012, Deputy chairman at PromEconomService Corporation, Ukraine. Was responsible for strategy and introduction of innovative industrial energy-saving and nature- conservative technologies at municipal and industrial enterprises.

2005–2017, Assistant Professor, Research Fellow at Donetsk National University, Ukraine. Scientific interest - innovative development, economic crises, green economy and energy aspects of globalization, Ukrainian unconventional energy sources.

2014 - Ukraine Reforms Communications Taskforce, International communications strategy manager, Kyiv. Establishing the communications helping to developing and disseminating all kinds of reforms-focused information products needed to build public awareness, understanding and support for reforms.

2014 - Washington Post, Fixer, Freelancer, contributed to more than 50 articles covering the events in Ukraine during the war in Donbas.

2020 - Radio host with "Green innovations" at Radio NV.

2020-22 - Invited lecturer at the GR post graduate course at the Kyiv School of Economics (KSE)

2020 Riabchyn has been appointed as the Head of the Competition Commission for the selection of candidates for the positions of members of the NEURC

== Low Carbon Business Development Advisor to CEO of Naftogaz of Ukraine (2021-2022) ==
Has been responsible for:

- Development of new green businesses
- Decarbonization of existing assets
- Implementation of best practices of sustainable development and EGS policies
- Analytical and legal support on the implementation of the corporate strategy for the board members

== Deputy Minister of Energy and Environmental Protection of Ukraine (2020-2021) ==
Has been responsible for:

- EU Green Deal alignment
- Energy efficiency
- Extractive Industries Transparency Initiative - EITI
- Carbon pricing and CO_{2} tax reform
- Development of electric mobility
- Scientific and innovative development
- Hydrogen energy

== People's Deputy (2014-2019) ==
In October 2014, he was elected to the Verkhovna Rada (the Ukrainian Parliament) on the party list of Batkivshchyna. During his parliamentary tenure he headed the subcommittee on energy saving and energy efficiency of the Committee on Fuel and Energy Complex, Nuclear Policy and Nuclear Safety. Riabchyn also co-chaired the inter-parliamentary friendship group with the United Kingdom of Great Britain and Northern Ireland. He was also member of the inter-factional caucus "The Eurooptimists" for civil society activists, journalists and professionals in the Ukrainian Parliament.

He has participated in lobbying and introducing numerous energy reforms in Ukraine. He personally championed initiatives supporting e-mobility, renewable energy and those focused on creating an energy efficiency market in Ukraine.

Dr. Oleksii Riabchyn represented Ukraine in Conferences of the Parties to the UNFCCC in Paris, Marrakesh, Bonn, Katowice, Madrid, Glasgow and Sharm-el-Sheikh. He is focused on climate change issues, sustainable development, green economy and supporting displaced universities that were relocated from Donbas and Crimea.

In the 2019 Ukrainian parliamentary election he was not re-elected after being placed #32 on the election list of Batkivshchyna. In the election Batkivschyna received 8.18% of the votes and 26 MPs (two elected in constituencies).
