= Yevhen Perebyinis =

Ukrainian diplomat

- Євген Перебийніс
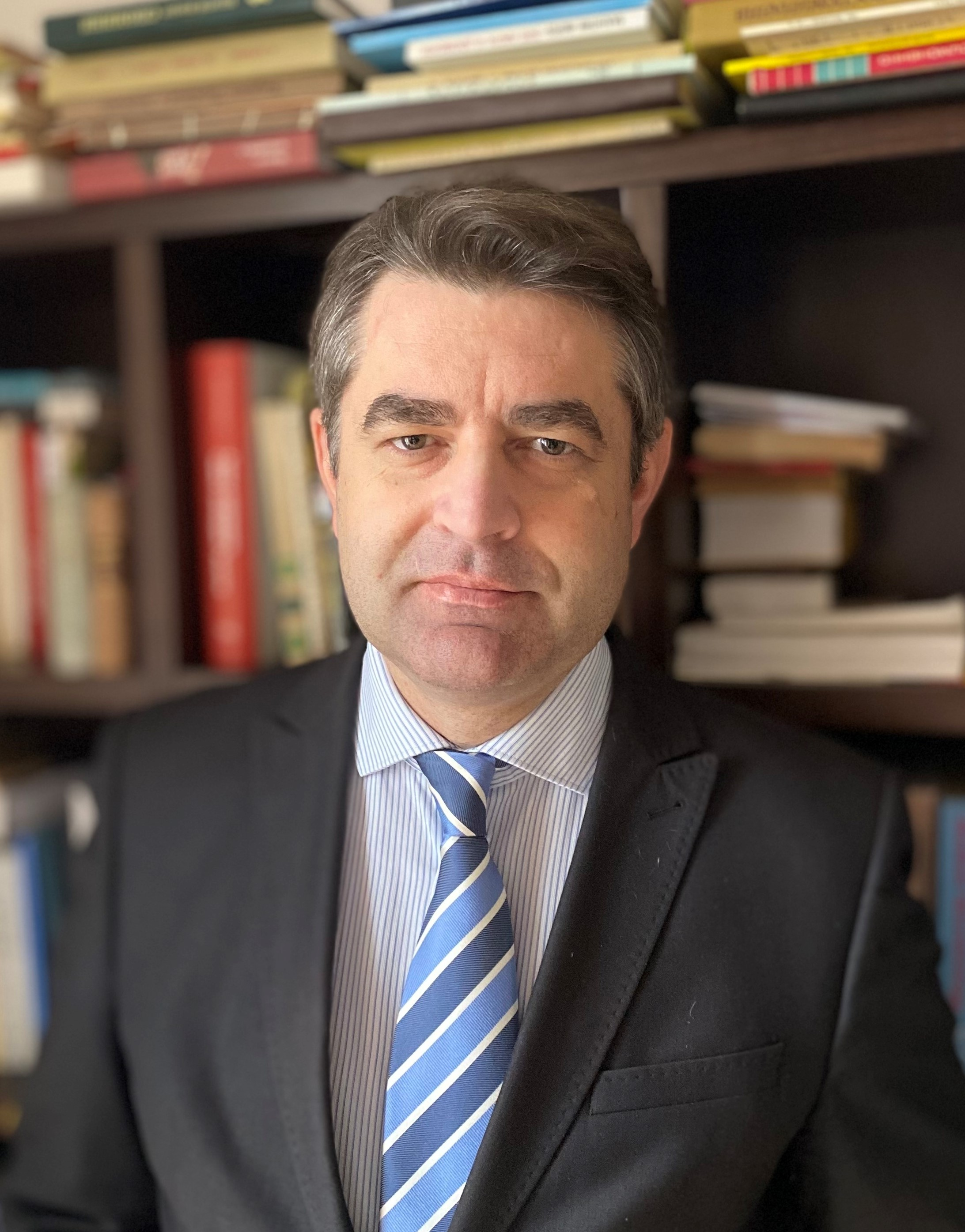

Deputy Minister of Foreign Affairs
- Incumbent
- Assumed office 27 July 2022

Ambassador of Ukraine to the Czech Republic
- In office 23 January 2017 – 9 July 2022
- Preceded by: Borys Zaychuk

Ambassador of Ukraine to Latvia
- In office 10 May 2015 – 23 January 2017
- Preceded by: Anatoliy Oliynyk
- Succeeded by: Oleksandr Mischenko

Ambassador of Ukraine to Sweden
- In office 29 August 2008 – 11 November 2011
- Preceded by: Anatoliy Ponomarenko
- Succeeded by: Valeriy Stepanov

Personal details
- Born: Yevhen Petrovych Perebyinis; 9 November 1968 (age 57) Ternopil, Ukrainian SSR, Soviet Union
- Party: Independent
- Spouse: Olha Perebyinis
- Education: Taras Shevchenko National University of Kyiv

Yevhen Petrovych Perebyinis (Ukrainian: Євген Петрович Перебийніс; born 9 November 1968), is a Ukrainian diplomat and politician who is currently the deputy minister of foreign affairs since 27 July 2022. who was the Ambassador of Ukraine to the Czech Republic from 23 January 2017 to 9 July 2022.

Perebyinis had served as the Ambassador to Latvia from 2015 to 2017, and the Ambassador to Sweden from 2008 to 2011.

== Biography ==
Perebyinis was born on 9 November 1968 in Ternopil. He graduated from Taras Shevchenko National University of Kyiv in 1992. He speaks four foreign languages: English, Russian, Czech and Slovak.

From 1992 to 1994, he was an Attaché, Third, Second Secretary of the Information Department of the Ministry of Foreign Affairs of Ukraine.

From 1994 to 1998, he was the Second, then promoted First Secretary of the Embassy of Ukraine in the Czech Republic.

From 1998 to 2000, he was the Senior Consultant, Chief Consultant, Deputy Head of the Department of the Main Directorate for Foreign Policy of the Administration of the President of Ukraine.

From 2000 to 2001, he was the Counselor of the Embassy of Ukraine in Greece.

From 2001 to 2004, he was the Counselor of the Embassy of Ukraine in the Czech Republic.

From 2004 to 2005, he was the Deputy Head of the Main Department for Foreign Policy of the Administration of the President of Ukraine.

From 2005 to 2006, he was the Deputy Head of the Main Foreign Policy Service, and then the Head of the Department of Bilateral and Regional Cooperation of the Secretariat of the President of Ukraine.

From 2006 to 2008, he was the Consul General of Ukraine in Prešov in Slovakia.

On 29 August 2008 to 11 November 2011, Perebyinis was the 6th Ambassador to Sweden.

From 2012 to 2013, he was an Ambassador and Plenipotentiary of the Ministry of Foreign Affairs of Ukraine.

In January 2013, he was the acting Director of the Information Policy Department, and a spokesman of the Ministry of Foreign Affairs of Ukraine. In June 2013, he officially became the Director of the Information Policy Department. In July 2014, he became the Deputy Director of the Department of Policy and Communications, Spokesman of the Ministry of Foreign Affairs of Ukraine.

As Deputy Director of the agency, Perebyinis made a number of high-profile statements in the media, in particular, he denied the Russians the right to be called the indigenous people of Ukraine, and the CIS, in his opinion, is a "puppet formation.".

On 10 May 2015, Perebyinis became the 7th Ambassador to Latvia.

On 23 January 2017, Perbyinis became the 7th Ambassador of Ukraine to the Czech Republic.

On 28 May 2022, he was involved in Embrace Ukraine. Strengthen the Union program, stating, "The majority of EU citizens – 71% - believe that Ukraine is part of the European family. However, it is important that politicians also hear the voice of their citizens and make the necessary decision on the legal consolidation of Ukraine's status. This will be a significant step towards our victory for a free, European future for Ukraine. Ukraine is Europe! Europe is Ukraine!"
