= Nataliya Katser-Buchkovska =

Ukrainian politician, economist, and environmentalist

- Наталія Кацер-Бучковська
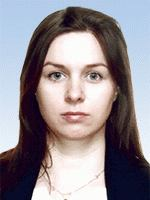

Member of Parliament
- In office 2014–2019

Personal details
- Born: 15 March 1983 (age 43) Buchach, Ukrainian SSR
- Citizenship: Ukrainian
- Education: Lviv University, University College London

Nataliya Katser-Buchkovska is a Ukrainian energy security and transition expert, economist, environmental advocate and former Member of Parliament of Ukraine (2014–2019). She has 20 years of professional experience in the field of corporate governance, investments, and energy, including 5 years serving as Chairwoman of the Subcommittee on Energy Security and Transition of the Committee on Fuel and Energy, Nuclear Policy and Nuclear Safety of the Parliament.

In 2020, she founded the Ukrainian Sustainable Fund, a green investment promotion vehicle aiming to accelerate impact investment and bridge the gap between Ukrainian sustainable projects and leading international green financial institutions.

Co-author of systemic economic and energy laws (on natural gas and electricity markets, renewables, the regulator of energy services markets, the protection of economic competition and ensuring market transparency.

She has a UCL Law & Economics Master's and Harvard Kennedy School National and International Security Executive Education, she is a member of the Aspen community and the Atlantic Council Millennium Fellows.

Regular participant of national and international energy and security conferences. Nataliya has published analytical articles in the Financial Times, Atlantic Council, and KyivPost; she is quoted by the BBC, Bloomberg.

== Education ==
Harvard Kennedy School, 2018-2020

Holds an Executive Education for Senior Executives in National and International Security, Leading Economic Growth, and Emerging Leaders.

University College London, 2010-2011 Holds a master's degree in Law and Economics. Has studied international finance, bank regulations, the economy of regulated markets, corporate law and finance, private equity funds, and investment.

Ivan Franko Lviv National University, 2000-2005 Holds Bachelor's and master's degrees in law.

Millenium Fellowship, 2019 Selected among young world leaders as an Atlantic Council Millennium Fellow (program on change management, responsible leadership, and international policy).

Nataliya is fluent in English and a native Ukrainian.

== Parliamentary activity ==
In autumn 2014, at the special election to the Verkhovna Rada of Ukraine, Mrs. Katser-Buchkovska was elected a Member of Parliament for the VIIIth convocations. Nataliya focus on establishing energy markets in Ukraine, promoting the energy transition, and attracting investments into the industry.

In December 2014, Nataiya was elected as a Head of the Subcommittee on Energy Security and Transition of the Committee on Fuel and Energy Complex, Nuclear Policy and Nuclear Safety. While working on the committee, MP Katser-Buchkovska has co-authored 49 bills and 19 laws, including the groundbreaking laws 'On Renewables' "On the Natural Gas Market", "On the National Commission on Energy and Utilities", "On the Electricity Market" and "On the Principles of State Policy in the Field of Energy Security". All these were crucial steps towards securing Ukraine's energy independence.

During her time as an MP, Nataliya has chaired the "Attraction and Protection of Investments", the "Green Energy of Change" and the "Eurooptimists" inter-factional unions. She has also led the inter-parliamentary relations groups with the Kingdom of the Netherlands and the Mexican United States as well as participated in the relations groups with the United Kingdom, Sweden, Lithuania, Japan and Switzerland.

Nataliya explores the possibilities and effects of increasing the capacity of gas pipelines with EU countries, evaluates the potential competitiveness of LNG supplies, and outlines the potential role of LNG supplies for Ukraine's energy security. Besides, Nataliya analyzes the availability of alternative gas supply options.

In 2022 Natalia founded Green Resilience Facility to support environmentally friendly businesses, such as wind farms, biomethane, green infrustructure, solar photovoltaic, small hydro projects, and energy storage technologies.

== Family ==
Nataliya is married and has two sons aged 7 and 9.
