= Pavlo Rizanenko =

Ukrainian politician

- Павло Різаненко
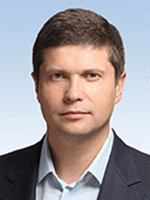
- Official portrait, 2014

People's Deputy of Ukraine
- In office 12 December 2012 – 29 August 2019
- Preceded by: Position established
- Succeeded by: Mykola Halushko
- Constituency: Kyiv Oblast, No. 97

Personal details
- Born: 12 July 1975 (age 49); Krasylivka, Ukrainian SSR, Soviet Union (now Ukraine)
- Political party: Ukrainian Democratic Alliance for Reform; Petro Poroshenko Bloc; Holos
- Education: Kyiv National University of Trade and Economics; Graceland University

Pavlo Oleksandrovych Rizanenko (Ukrainian: Павло́ Олекса́ндрович Різане́нко; born 12 July 1975) is a Ukrainian activist and politician who served as a People's Deputy of Ukraine from Ukraine's 97th electoral district between 2012 and 2019. Prior to this, he served as a member of the Brovary city council between 2010 and 2012.

== Education ==
In 1992, Rizanenko graduated from Brovary High School No. 2 with Silver Medal distinction.

After graduating from high school, Rizanenko attended Kyiv Trade and Economic Institute (KTEI) from 1992 to 1994. He studied at the Faculty of Economics and Management with the specialization in International Business and Entrepreneurship.

In 1994, Rizanenko won student competition and got a NAFSA/USAID grant for study at Graceland College (Lamoni, IA) in the USA.

In 1996 Pavlo Rizanenko graduated from the Graceland College with a BA degree with double major "Economics" and "Business Administration" (double concentration in Corporate Finance and International Business).

In 2001 Rizanenko successfully passed the exams and received Chartered Financial Analyst (CFA) professional designation.

In 2016 Rizanenko obtained Master of Banking degree from the University of Banking (Kyiv, Ukraine).

== Career ==
Rizanenko started his career in 1996 as an auditor at Ukrainian office of Ernst & Young - international audit firm. Two years he was promoted to senior auditor.

From 1999 to 2005 Rizanenko lived in Moscow and worked at the local investment company Troika Dialog. He started as a consultant and worked his way up to become a director of investment banking division.

From 2005 to 2007 Rizanenko worked at Renaissance Capital Investment Company (Russian Federation) as a director of the investment and banking department responsible for the mining and metals sector.

From 2005 to 2006 Rizanenko was a board member of the VSMPO-AVISMA Corporation (Russian Federation) - the international leader of the production of titanium and its products for the global aerospace industry.

== Public activity ==
Since November 2011 Rizanenko is chairman of NGO "Transparent Society" (Brovary, Kyiv region).

Since January 2012 Rizanenko is chairman of Kyiv Regional NGO "Civil protection of Kyiv region".

== Political activity ==
In October 2010 Rizanenko was elected as a deputy of the Brovary City Council, in the 20th district. He did not belong to any party or faction. As a deputy, Rizanenko concentrated his activities on counteracting the illegal alienation of the land and the thefts of communal property. He was in opposition to the city authorities and the Brovary City Council officials.

On 1 August 2012, Rizanenko was approved to become a candidate for the People's Deputy of Ukraine from the Ukrainian Democratic Alliance for Reform in Ukraine's 97th electoral district. Rizanenko was ultimately successful, with 31.04% of the vote, and became a deputy of the 7th Ukrainian Verkhovna Rada (parliament).

On 25 December 2012, Rizanenko became a Deputy Chairman of Special Commission of the Verkhovna Rada of Ukraine on Privatization and a member of the Committee of the Verkhovna Rada on issues of budget. On 14 March 2014, Rizanenko became a co-chair of an inter-faction union "The Platform of Reforms".

On 25 November 2014 Rizanenko was returned to the Verkhovna Rada following his re-election in the 2014 Ukrainian parliamentary election. In the election, Rizanenko, this time running under the Petro Poroshenko Bloc, increased his vote share to 34.11%.

On 13 February 2015 Rizanenko became the Deputy Chairman of Special Control Commission of the Verkhovna Rada on Privatization and Chairman of the Subcommittee on securities, stock market, activities of rating agencies and e-Commerce Committee of the Verkhovna Rada Committee on financial policy and banking.

In February 2015 Rizanenko became a member of the Interfactional Union "Eurooptimists".

Rizanenko took part in the 2019 Ukrainian parliamentary election in an electoral district for the party Holos. However, Rizanenko was ultimately unsuccessful, placing third with 9.82% of the vote. Mykola Halushko, Servant of the People candidate, was elected as People's Deputy.
