= Mustafa Nayyem =

Afghan-Ukrainian journalist and politician (born 1981)

- Мустафа Найєм مصطفى نعیم
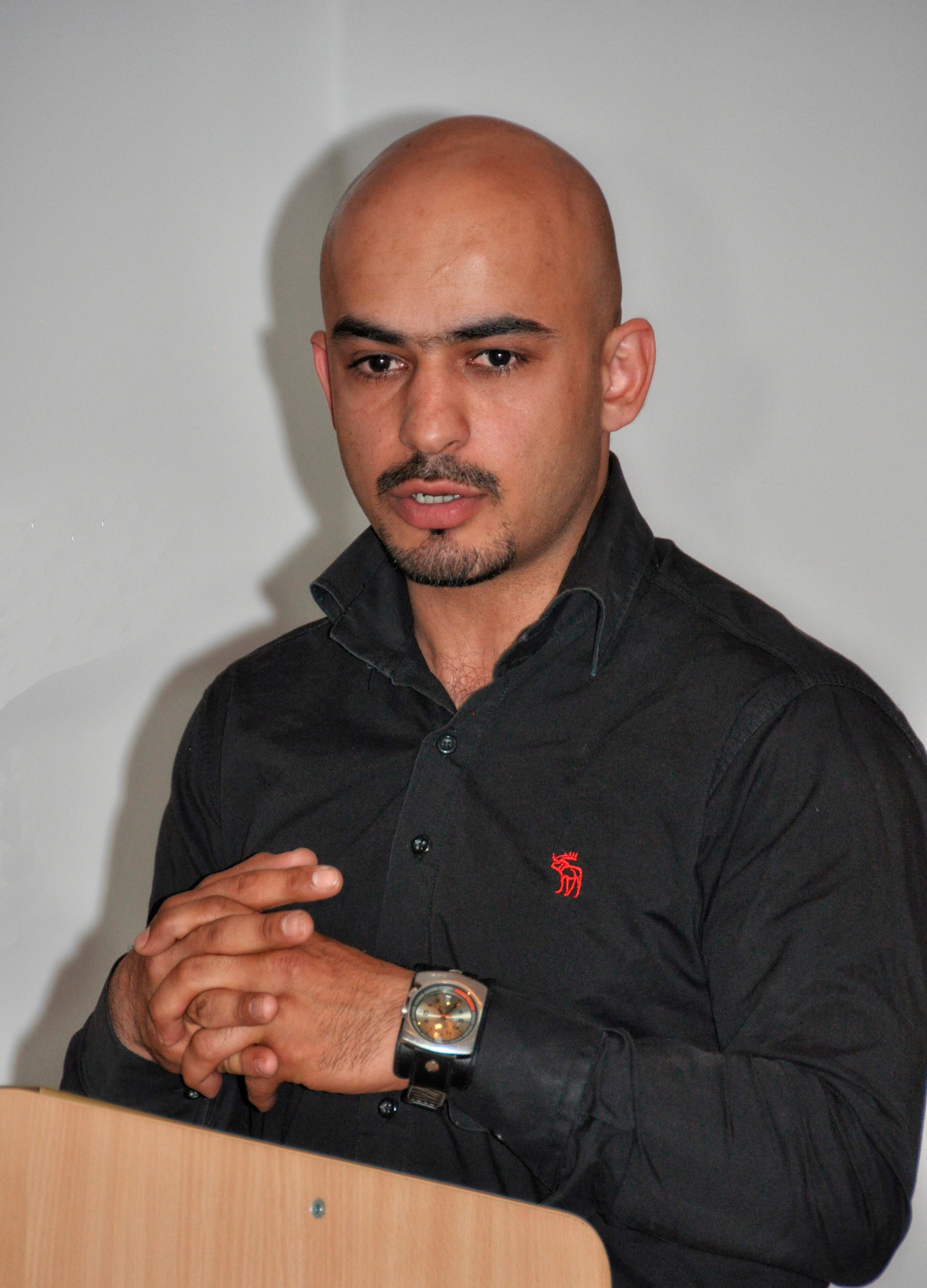
- Nayyem in 2011

People's Deputy of Ukraine
- In office 27 November 2014 – 24 July 2019
- Constituency: Petro Poroshenko Bloc, No. 20

Personal details
- Born: June 28, 1981 (age 45) Kabul, Democratic Republic of Afghanistan
- Party: Democratic Alliance
- Other political affiliations: Petro Poroshenko Bloc (until August 2016)
- Education: Kyiv Polytechnic Institute; Taras Shevchenko National University of Kyiv
- Occupation: Publicist, journalist for Kommersant, Ukrayinska Pravda, and Hromadske.TV

Mustafa Masi Nayyem (Ukrainian: Мустафа Найєм, Pashto: مصطفی نعیم; born June 28, 1981) is an Afghan-Ukrainian journalist, MP, lecturer at the Kyiv School of Economics, and public figure who was influential in sparking the Euromaidan in Ukraine. Since January 2023 Nayyem had been the head of the State Agency for Restoration and Infrastructure Development. He resigned (and was officially dismissed) in June 2024. Prior to this he was Deputy Minister of Infrastructure appointed in August 2021.

Formerly, before his bureaucratic career Nayyem was a reporter for the newspaper Kommersant Ukraine, the TVi channel, and the online newspaper Ukrayinska Pravda. He also participates in Ukrainian journalists' anti-censorship movement, "Stop the censorship!" (Ukrainian: Стоп цензурі!, Stop tsenzuri!), and Hromadske.TV. In the parliamentary elections he was elected to the Ukrainian parliament on the list of Petro Poroshenko Bloc. Nayyem did not take part in the 2019 Ukrainian parliamentary election.

== Personal life and education ==
Nayyem was born in Kabul in 1981 and lived in an elite district near the Tajbeg Palace. In 1984, ten days after his younger brother Masi Nayyem was born, their mother died. He has stated that he is a Pashtun, a "Muslim by birth", and his native tongue is Dari. In Afghanistan, his father, Muhammad Naim (Ukrainian: Мухаммад Наїм), had been Minister of Education and was responsible for the construction of educational facilities before the USSR invasion of Afghanistan in December 1979. After the Soviet invasion, his father did not want to work for the Soviets and quit his post. In 1987 and because of the destruction of the ongoing Soviet Union's War in Afghanistan, his father went to Moscow to study and met Ukrainian Valentina Kolechko whom he later married in early 1989. Mustafa Nayyem became fluent in Russian and Ukrainian after he moved with his father to Moscow in August 1989 (Note: Later, his father brought his brother Masi to Moscow in 1990.) living near the Nakhimovsky Prospekt metro station and later to Kyiv in 1990 attending 61st school near the Lukyanivsky market.

Nayyem graduated from the Technical Lyceum in Kyiv in 1998, and the Aerospace Systems Department of Kyiv Polytechnic Institute in 2004. He speaks fluent Ukrainian, Pashto, Russian, and English.

He and Anastasia Ivanova who is from Lviv and was a photographer for Kommersant-Ukraine (Ukrainian: Коммерсантъ Украина), have a son, Mark-Mikhei (born 13 January 2008), and both mother and son are Jewish.

His brother Masi Nayem is a lawyer and, in April 2016, deployed as a Ukrainian paratrooper to the Donbas - Avdiivka industrial zone which was the hottest point of the Russo-Ukrainian War. During the 2022 full scale Russian invasion of Ukraine Masi Nayem returned to the front. On 5 June 2022 his brother Mustafa Nayyem reported that he had been seriously injured. Masi Nayem survived his injuries, but lost one eye.

== Career ==
=== Journalism ===
Nayyem worked as a reporter for the Kommersant-Ukrainy newspaper from 2005 to 2007, and then for Shuster LIVE, a political talk show on Ukrainian television, from 2007 to 2011.

In 2009, Nayyem received national attention following Ukrayina TV channel's live discussion with then-presidential candidate Viktor Yanukovych. During the discussion, he questioned Yanukovych about the latter's acquisition of the Mezhyhirya Residence. In 2010, Nayem was briefly detained by police officers, reportedly as a result of racial profiling for "persons of Caucasian appearance" (a common local term for people from the Caucasus). The following day, Nayem wrote an article in which described the events that led to his detention. He stated, "Xenophobia should not become the face of Ukrainian nationality" and requested the dismissal of one of the officers responsible.

Nayyem frequently contributes news and articles to Ukrayinska Pravda. From September 2011 to late April 2013, he worked for the Ukrainian television channel TVi. After resigning due to a conflict with the channel's new management, he started a web project together with colleagues who also left the channel. Their project was named Hromadske.TV.

=== Activism ===
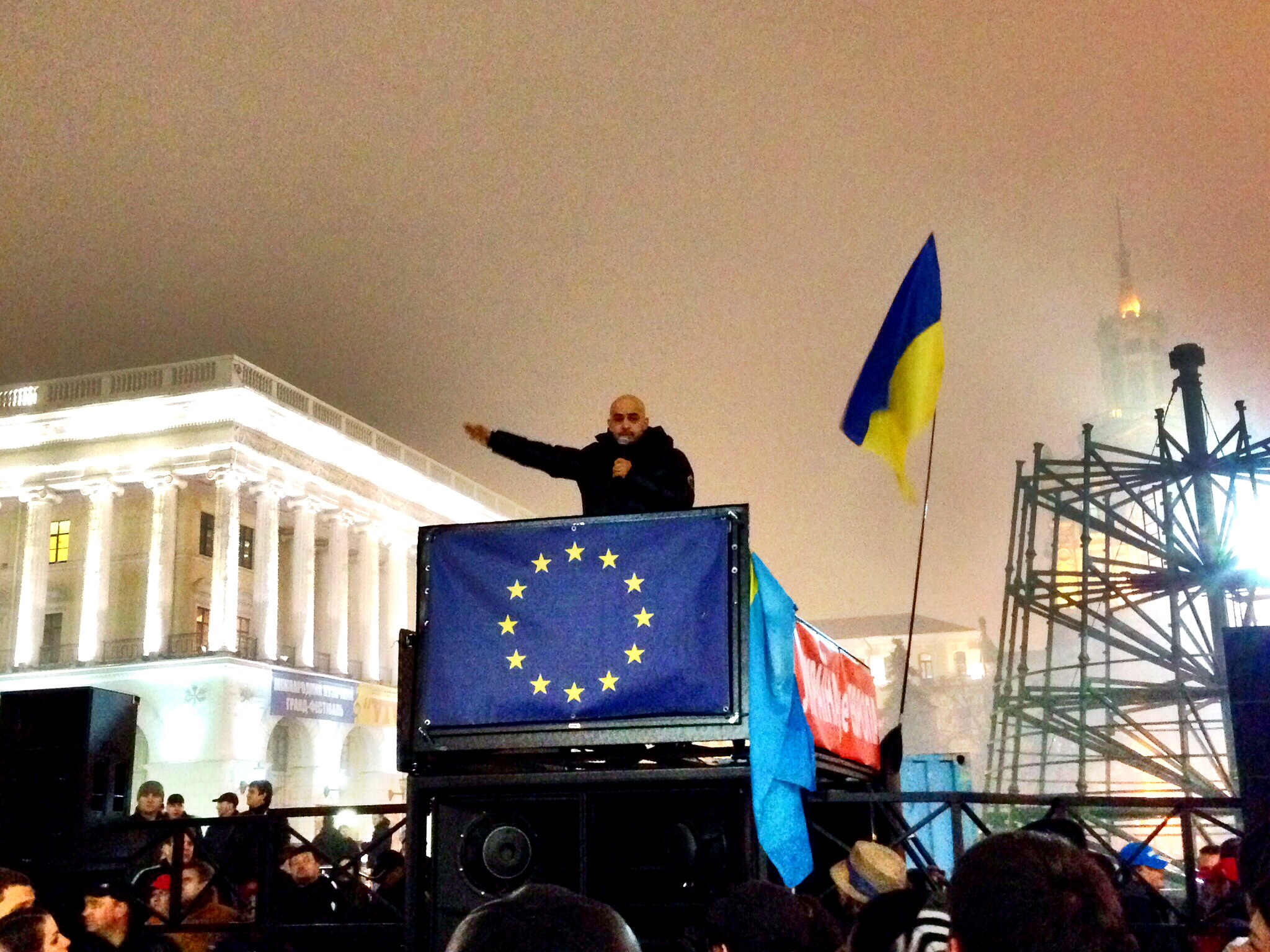
Mustafa Nayyem at Euromaidan on 23 November 2013

Using Facebook, Nayyem was one of the first activists to urge Ukrainians to gather on Maidan Nezalezhnosti (Independence Square) in Kyiv to protest Viktor Yanukovych's decision to "pause" preparations for signing the European Union–Ukraine Association Agreement (with the European Union). His post (Note: He posted, in Russian: "Встречаемся в 22:30 под монументом Независимости. Одевайтесь тепло, берите зонтики, чай, кофе, хорошее настроение и друзей. Перепост всячески приветствуется!" ("Meet you at 10:30 pm under the Monument of Independence. Wear warmth, take umbrellas, tea, coffee, good mood and friends. Repost in every possible way Welcome!")) on Facebook on November 21, 2013, was a summons to rally for the Euromaidan protests which led to the overthrow of the Yanukovych government, in the so-called Revolution of Dignity.

=== Politics ===
Nayyem was included in the electoral list of Petro Poroshenko Bloc (PPB) and elected to the Verkhovna Rada (Ukraine's national parliament) on the parliamentary elections of October 26, 2014. He was one of dozens of Euromaidan activists who pivoted from street politics into politics, where they sought to spearhead reform and turn Ukraine into a prosperous European state. Nayyem was a member of the Committee of the Verkhovna Rada on issues of European integration. At the Rada session of 2 December 2014 he was the only deputy who voted against the cabinet of Arseniy Yatsenyuk. Gradually he began to criticize the Petro Poroshenko Bloc (PPB) more and more and stopped voting in sync with it. According to deputy head of the PPB faction Oleksiy Honcharenko by February 2019 he had not attended PPB faction meetings for several years.

In August 2016 Nayyem joined the (political party) Democratic Alliance. From Autumn 2015 until June 2016, he had been part of an attempt to form a political party around then Governor of Odesa Oblast Mikheil Saakashvili with members of the parliamentary group Interfactional Union "Eurooptimists", Democratic Alliance and possibly Self Reliance until this projection collapsed in June 2016.

In October 2014, in the Parliament, he was engaged in writing draft laws related to anti-corruption and law enforcement activities and was the author of the following draft laws:

- on the protection of public order and the state border.
- on the activities of the State Bureau of Investigation.
- on ensuring transparency and legality of communication with subjects of authority.
- on checking drivers of vehicles for intoxication.
- about the territory of Ukraine temporarily occupied by the Russian Federation.
- about the prosecutor's office (regarding the peculiarities of the functioning of the Qualification and Disciplinary Commission of Prosecutors during the transition period).
- on financing the activity of administrative service centers.
- about the National Police (regarding the identification of police officers).
- regarding the activities of the State Bureau of Investigation.
- about the National Bureau of Financial Security of Ukraine.
- regarding the improvement of the examination procedure.
- regarding the strengthening of responsibility for crimes committed against the sexual freedom and inviolability of minors.

In the same year, the curator of the launch of patrol police in Zakarpattia Oblast, namely in the cities of Uzhhorod, Mukachevo, Ivano-Frankivsk, Chernivtsi, as well as in Kramatorsk, Sloviansk, Sievierodonetsk, Lysychansk, Rubizhne, Mariupol.

On 28 February 2019 Nayyem voluntarily left the BPP faction.

On 21 June 2019 Nayyem announced that he would not take part in the 2019 Ukrainian parliamentary election. The Economist described him in 2017 as a reformist parliamentarian.

In November 2019 Nayyem was appointed Deputy Director General of Ukroboronprom. He was dismissed from this position on 29 April 2021 due to the position being abolished (which had not been communicated to him).

From 4 August 2021 to 28 January 2023 Nayyem was Deputy Minister of Infrastructure.

On 28 January 2023 the Cabinet of Ministers of Ukraine appointed Nayyem as head of the State Agency for Restoration and Infrastructure Development. He resigned on 10 June 2024 after Prime Minister Denys Shmyhal denied his request to attend an upcoming summit on Ukraine's recovery from the Russian invasion of Ukraine in Berlin. Nayyem also cited "systemic obstacles" from within the government that affected his duties for his resignation. The official reason given why he could not attend the summit was that Nayyem would have to attend a government meeting with the participation of the Restoration Agency that took place on the day of the conference. He was officially dismissed by the Cabinet of Ministers on 18 June 2024.

=== Cultural print in Ukrainian politics ===
Ukrainian entertaining group "Kvartal 95" mentioned Nayyem in their song about Ihor Kolomoyskyi (the name of latter omitted in the song) and their meeting in relation to the "Ukrnafta issue" that surfaced in the Ukrainian media soon after Euromaidan events.

== Awards and honors ==
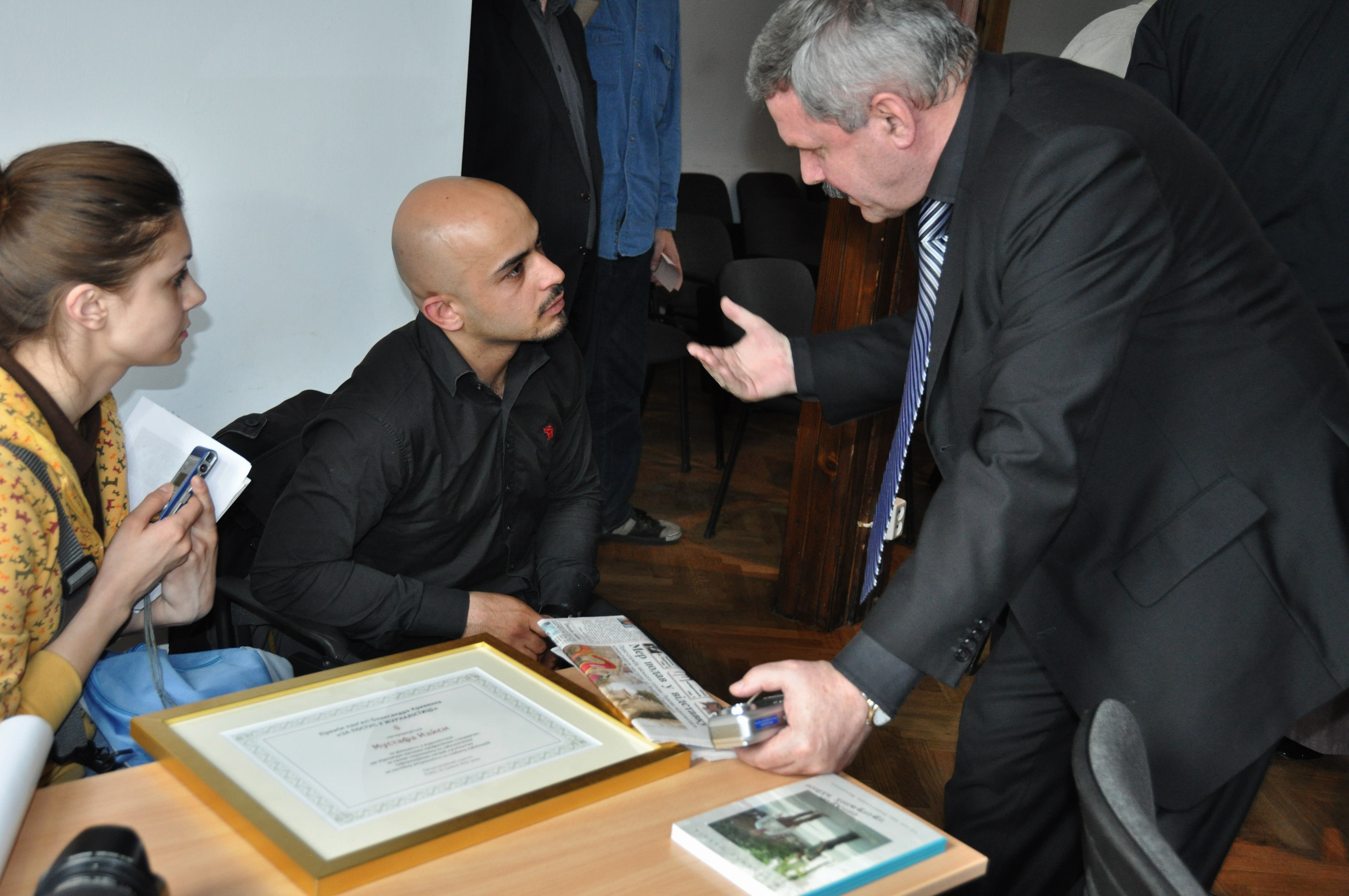
Nayyem receiving the Oleksandr Kryvenko award

In 2010, Nayyem was awarded the Oleksandr Kryvenko prize "For Progress In Journalism" and in 2014 the Gerd Bucerius Prize for Free Press in Eastern Europe.
