= Socialists (Ukraine) =

Political Party "Socialists" Політична партія «Соціалісти»
- Leader: Yevhen Anoprienko (last)
- Founder: Vasyl Tsushko
- Founded: 1 August 2014; 28 January 2015 (current name)
- Banned: 23 September 2022
- Split from: Socialist Party of Ukraine
- Ideology: Socialism
- Political position: Left-wing
- Colours: Red

Website
- socialisty.com.ua

The Political Party "Socialists" (Ukrainian: Політична партія «Соціалісти», romanized: Politychna partiia «Sotsialisty») was a pro-Russian left-wing political party in Ukraine. Founded in August 2014 as Political Party of Workers, Peasants, and Intelligentsia of Ukraine (Ukrainian: Політична партія «Робітників, селян, інтелігенції України», romanized: Politychna partiia «Robitnykiv, selian, intelihentsii Ukrainy»), the party adopted its current name in February 2015. The party's last leader, Yevhen Anoprienko, was elected in November 2019.

The activity of the party was terminated on 19 March 2022 by the National Security and Defense Council of Ukraine under martial law. On 23 September 2022 after its final appeal at the Supreme Court of Ukraine was dismissed, the party was banned in Ukraine.

== History ==
Under its current name, the party was registered by the Ministry of Justice of Ukraine on January 28, 2015. Vasyl Tsushko, a veteran of the socialist movement, was elected head of the party. On May 21, 2016, he announced the resignation of his powers and resignation from the party due to another cyclical deterioration of his health.

On June 25, 2016, at the 5th congress of the party, Leonid Kozhara, the Minister of Foreign Affairs of Ukraine (2012-2014), the acting chairman of the OSCE (2013), the People's Deputy of Ukraine of the 5th-6th-7th convocations (from 2006 until 2014), was elected as the chairman of the "Socialists". On November 27, 2019, he submitted a statement to the party's congress about resigning his powers and leaving the party.

On November 27, 2019, at an extraordinary party congress, Yevhen Anoprienko was elected head of the Socialists. Anoprineko was associated with the Committee for the Salvation of Ukraine, an organisation styling themselves as a government-in-exile comprising former members of the Viktor Yanukovych administration based in Russia.

Party representatives regularly appeared on news channels linked to pro-Russian politician Viktor Medvedchuk, 112th channel, ZIK and NewsOne, as well as Yevhen Murayev's NASH.

On the eve of the 2020 local elections the party announced that it would merge with Reasonable Force, All-Ukrainian People's Union, and Union of Left Forces, but this merger did not materialise.

The activity of the party was terminated on 19 March 2022 by the National Security and Defense Council of Ukraine due to martial law. On 14 June 2022 the Eighth Administrative Court of Appeal banned this party. The property of the party and all its branches were transferred to the state. The party was banned because it was seen as a collaborator with Russia. The decision was open to an appeal at the Supreme Court of Ukraine. On 23 September 2022 the final appeal against the party's ban was dismissed by the Supreme Court of Ukraine, meaning that the party was fully banned in Ukraine.

=== Elections ===
In the 2015 local elections, the party nominated candidates for regional centers and regional councils in most regions of the country, but did not get into any council.

In December 2018, the congress of "Socialists" nominated Leonid Kozhara as a candidate for the presidency.

In the 2020 local elections the party nominated candidates for the Sumy City Council.

== Ideology ==
The party is left-wing and socialist; political observers note that the party is far from a social-democratic orientation and leans more towards communism.

Socialists support complete geopolitical neutrality of Ukraine and oppose Ukrainian membership in the EU and NATO; a former leader of the party, Vasyl Tsushko, also condemned the Orange Revolution.
