= Leonid Kozhara =

Ukrainian politician

- Леонід Кожара
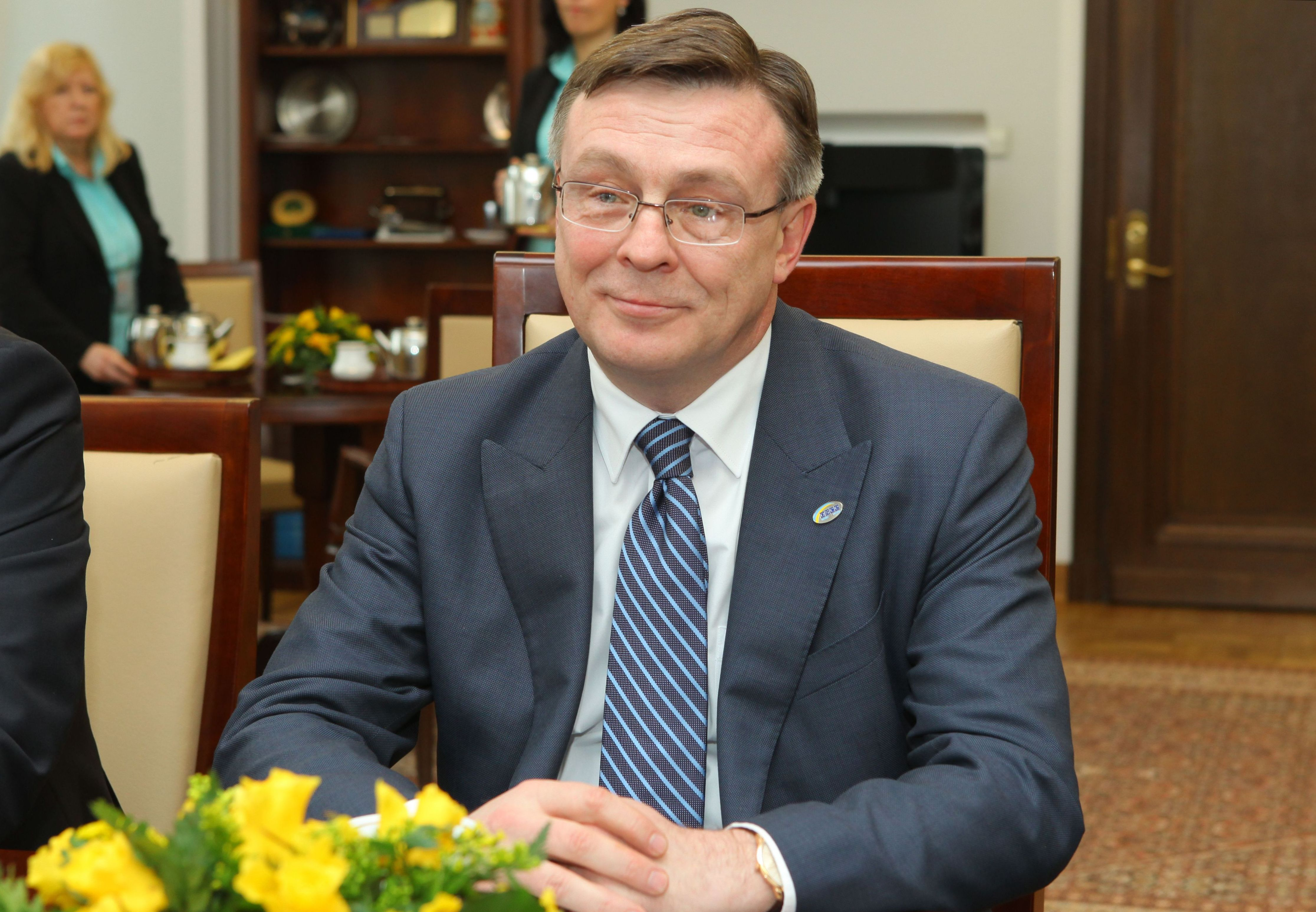
- Kozhara in 2013

Minister of Foreign Affairs
- In office 24 December 2012 – 23 February 2014
- President: Viktor Yanukovych
- Prime Minister: Mykola Azarov
- Preceded by: Kostyantyn Gryshchenko
- Succeeded by: Andrii Deshchytsia (acting)

Ukrainian Ambassador to Sweden
- In office 14 November 2002 – 6 July 2004
- President: Leonid Kuchma
- Preceded by: Oleksandr Slipchenko
- Succeeded by: Oleksandr Danyleiko

Personal details
- Born: 14 January 1963 (age 63) Poltava, Ukrainian SSR, Soviet Union
- Party: Party of Regions (until 2014) No party (2014-2015) "Socialists"(2015-2022)
- Education: Kyiv University
- Occupation: Jurist

Leonid Oleksandrovych Kozhara (Ukrainian: Леонід Олександрович Кожара, Russian: Леонид Александрович Кожара, born 14 January 1963) is a former Minister of Foreign Affairs of Ukraine. In 2013 he was the OSCE's (Organization for Security and Co-operation in Europe) Chairperson-in-Office, during the Ukrainian presidency of the OSCE.

After the Revolution of Dignity, Kozhara was not charged for his role in the Yanukovych presidency, owing largely due to his dismissal by parliamentary vote shortly before Yanukovych fled to Russia. Kozhara would then join the newly-established pro-Russian party "Socialists". However, on 25 March 2020 Kozhara was arrested by security forces on charges of murdering advertising mogul Serhiy Starytsky on 21 February 2020, and on 23 September 2022, the party "Socialists" was banned by Ukraine.

== Early life and education ==
Kozhara was born in Poltava on 14 January 1963. He graduated from Kyiv State University in 1985 with a bachelor's degree in international law. In 1985 to 1990 he studied at the Higher Party School of the Central Committee of Communist Party of Ukraine (today is part of the Kyiv University).

== Career ==
From 1990 to 1992 Kozhara worked as a senior adviser at the parliamentary secretariat. Until 1994 he worked at the Presidential Administration of Ukraine. From 1994 to 1997 he worked at the Ukrainian Embassy in the United States. From 1997 to 2002 he was returned to work at the Presidential Administration of Ukraine. In 2002, Kozhara was appointed Ambassador of Ukraine to Sweden which he held the position until 2004. From 2004 to January 2005 he once again on a service at the Presidential administration. From 2006 to 2012 Kozhara was a member of Verkhovna Rada from Party of Regions. He worked in the parliamentary committee on foreign affairs. In March 2010 he was appointed among eleven others "supernumerary advisors" to Ukrainian President Viktor Yanukovych. In 2011, Kozhara served as the first deputy of the Party of Regions. He was placed at number 9 on the electoral list of the party during the October 2012 Ukrainian parliamentary election. In December 2012 Kozhara was appointed minister of foreign affairs. On 23 February 2014, just after the "Maidan revolution", the Verkhovna Rada dismissed Foreign Minister Kozhara and Education Minister Dmytro Tabachnyk.

Kozhara did not participate in the 2014 Ukrainian parliamentary election.

Then he became Chairman of the (registered in January 2015) party Socialist. On 14 June 2022 the Eighth Administrative Court of Appeal banned this party. The property of the party and all its branches were transferred to the state. The party was banned because it was seen as a collaborator with Russia. The decision was open to an appeal at the Supreme Court of Ukraine. On 23 September 2022 the final appeal against the party's ban was dismissed by the Supreme Court of Ukraine, meaning that the party was fully banned in Ukraine.

=== Role in Euromaidan ===
During Ukraine's Euromaidan-protests and its political implications of December 2013, Kozhara warned foreign policymakers to not intervene with Ukraine's internal affairs. Kozhara stated according to Kyiv Post: "Ukraine is a sovereign state, and it should make decisions on its own. We do not allow interference in our internal affairs. Nobody is allowed to openly meddle in internal national processes that are taking place in the country today".

At the Munich Security Conference on 1 February, Kozhara gave his opinion of Dmytro Bulatov, leader of "Automaidan," a group of drivers who have provided support for Euromaidan protesters. According to reports, Bulatov said he was abducted and tortured, and that he had been held for eight days. BBC News reported that Bulatov appeared on TV with a gash on his face and part of his ear cut off and left the country to receive medical treatment. "'The only thing he has is a scratch on one of his cheeks,' Kozhara told broadcaster al-Jazeera, 'It looks like the alleged story that he was kidnapped and tortured is not absolutely true.'"

== Suspect in the 2020 murder of Serhiy Starytsky ==
On 25 March 2020 Kozhara was arrested by security forces on charges of murdering advertising mogul Serhiy Starytsky on 21 February 2020. According to media reports both were "in a state of heavy intoxication" at a party at Kozhara's house at the time of the alleged shooting. Kozhara and his wife claim that Starytsky had committed suicide, according to the Ukrainian prosecutorial office this was not true.

Starytsky is a former head of the Inter TV channel and was the general director of the Atlantic Group holding. He was allegedly shot dead in the house of Kozhara and his wife, Maryna Kozerod, in village Chaiky (Kyiv-Sviatoshyn Raion), the suburb of Kyiv, on 21 February 2020.
