= Olena Sotnyk =

Ukrainian politician

- Олена Сергіївна Сотник
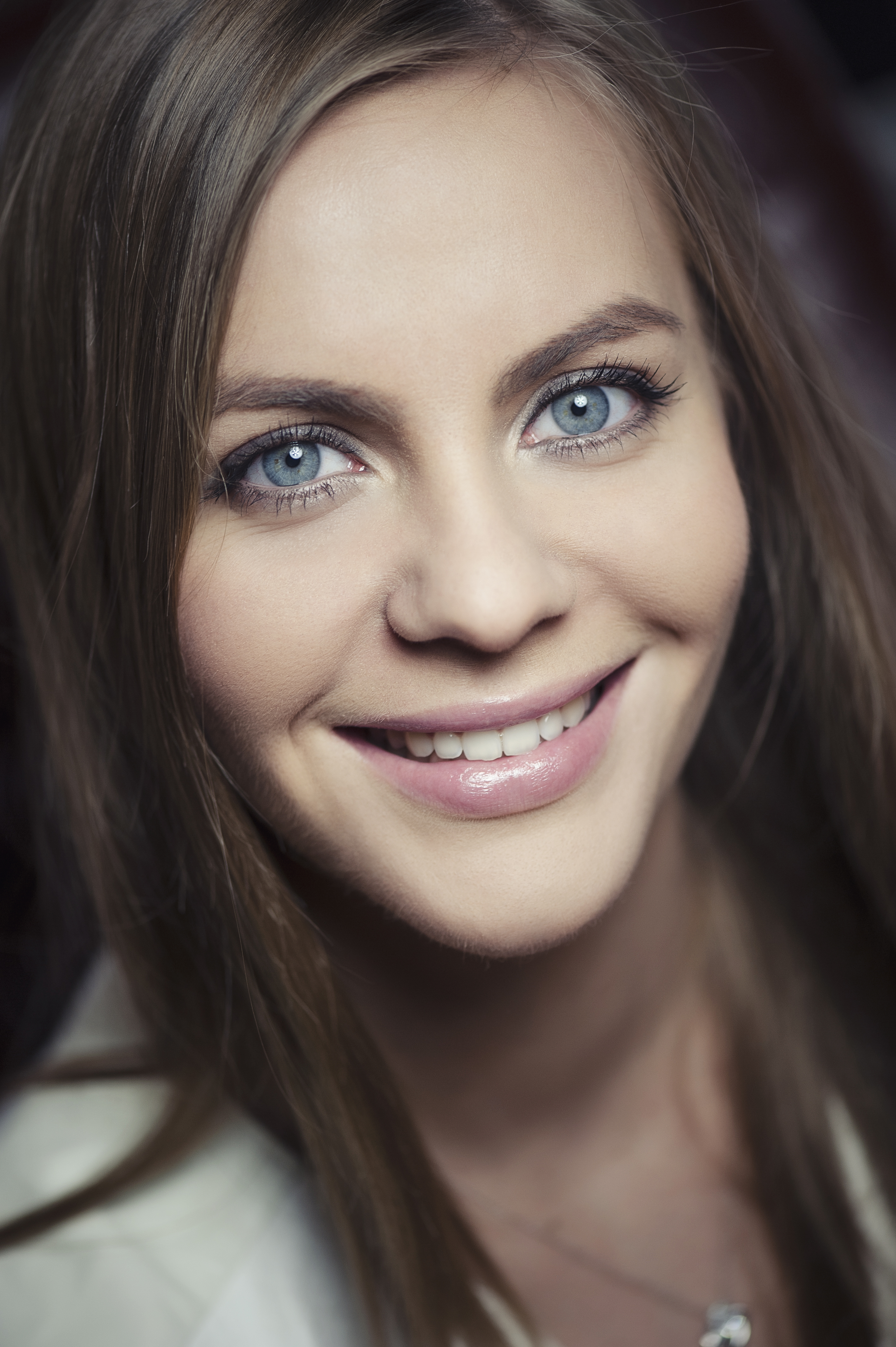
- Sotnyk in 2014

Member of the Parliament of Ukraine
- In office 27 November 2014 – 24 July 2019

Personal details
- Born: Olena Serhijivna Sotnyk Kyiv
- Party: Self Reliance
- Education: King's College London

Olena Serhijivna Sotnyk (Note: Ukrainian: Олена Сергіївна Сотник) is a Ukrainian public figure, lawyer and politician, former Member of the Parliament of Ukraine (VIII convocation) from Samopomich ("Self-Reliance") Party. She was the secretary of the Verkhovna Rada Committee on European integration; Sotnyk served as a Head of the Sub-committee on Approximation of Ukrainian Legislation to the EU Law. Shed co-chaired the Inter-Parliamentary Relations Unit with Belgium. She was Chairman of the Committee on Legal Affairs and Human Rights at the PACE, a member of the Bureau of Women's Parliamentarians in the Inter-Parliamentary Union and a vice-president of political group the Alliance of Liberals and Democrats for Europe in the PACE. Sotnyk was the first female to represent Ukraine in the Yale World Fellows Program. She was one of the most successful women of Ukraine in 2019 according to the "New Time" and "Legal Newspaper".

== Education ==
• 2005 – graduated from the National Academy of Internal Affairs of Ukraine, having received a diploma in jurisprudence. In the same year she graduated from the Academy of Municipal Management, having received a diploma of "Manager-Economist" and diploma in "Local Self-Government".

• 2011–2012 – studied at the Ukrainian School of Political Studies (project of Council of Europe in Ukraine).

• 2012 – graduated from the National Pedagogical University named after Drahomanov, having received a diploma in psychology.

• 2013 – participant in the 7th "Responsible Leadership" Seminar with the support of the Aspen Ukraine Initiative Alumni Association.

• 2017 – participant in the Council of Europe workshop on the exchange of best practices in legislation between the Parliaments of Ukraine and Sweden in Stockholm; member of the Aspen program "Order Amid Chaos: Major Trends Shaping the Future Technologies, Business, Culture and Society"; graduated from the training program for global democratic leaders of the Stanford Center for Democracy, Development and Rule of Law (the Draper Hills Summer Fellows Program);

• 2018 – graduated from the Stanford Center for Democracy, Development and Rule of Law on the Leadership Academy for Development.

• 2019 – Yale World Fellows Program.

• 2023 – Master's Degree in Conflict, Security, and Development at King's College London, traveling between London and war-torn Ukraine.

== Career ==
• 1999–2001 – freelance correspondent of the Ukrainian newspaper "Fakty i Kommentarii", the Department of Social Policy and Education.

• 2004 – began to work as the chief legal counsel at the company "Svema" in Shostka, Sumy region.

• 2005 – Head of legal department of the company PC JV"SD Ltd".

• 2006 – Executive Director of the Bar Association "Advocate Group Solodko & Partners".

• 31 May 2007 – passed the qualification exam in Kyiv City Qualification-Disciplinary Bar commission and obtained the certificate of attorney (No. 2945).

• Since 2008 – Partner of the Bar Association "Advocate Group Solodko & Partners".

• 2009 – licensed trustee in the issues of bankruptcy.

• Since 2014 – Member of the Parliament of Ukraine. Secretary of the Verkhovna Rada Committee on European Integration. Head of the Sub-committee on Approximation of Ukrainian Legislation to the EU Law.

• 2015 – Member of the Parliamentary Delegation to the Parliamentary Assembly of the Council of Europe. Vice-President of political group the Alliance of Liberals and Democrats for Europe in PACE. Member of the Committee on Political Affairs and Democracy, Sub-committee on External Relations, Sub-committee on Implementation of the Judgments of the European Court of Human Rights. An Alternate Member of the Committee on Legal Affairs and Human Rights, the Sub-committee on Criminal Problems and the Fight against Terrorism, Sub-committee on relations with the OECD and the EBRD.

Member of the Ukrainian Parliamentary Association (the Parliamentary Association Committee between the European Union and Ukraine), which is a forum for the members of the Verkhovna Rada of Ukraine and the European Parliament to hold meetings and exchange views.

• 2017 – Chairman of the Committee on Legal Affairs and Human Rights in the PACE.

• 2018 – Vice-Chairman of the Committee on Legal Affairs and Human Rights in the PACE. Elected member of the Bureau of Women's Parliamentarians in the Inter-Parliamentary Union.

== Public activity ==
• 2009–2012 – coordinator of the social projects in the framework of the NGO "Territory of Childhood" aimed to protect and reinforce the rights of young people raised in orphanages and boarding schools.

• 2010–2012 – Head of the Kyiv Branch of the Ukrainian Bar Association. During that period the following charity projects were conducted to help children deprived of paternal care: "Your right" and "Formation of legal consciousness".

• 2011 – became a member of the Expert Council within Parliamentary Committee on Industrial Policy and Entrepreneurship.

• 2011 and 2013 – elected to the Board of the Ukrainian Bar Association.

• 2012 – coordinated the project publication "Guide to Adulthood" focused on the basic rights and guarantees to young people raised in orphanages and boarding schools.

• 2008 – 2012 – Member of the International Bar Association.

• From 2013 – Member of the Public Council within the Ukrainian State Financial Monitoring Service.

• 2013 – founded the NGO "Business Angels" to organize educational and awareness programs for children and young people.

• From 2013 to 2014 – Member of the Coordinating Council of Alumni Association "Aspen-Ukraine".

• In October 2012 – elected to be a member of the municipal body of attorneys "Bar Council of Kyiv".

• Since December 2013 – Member of the Center of Legal Aid for Victims of the events on the Independence Square in Kyiv.

• 2014 – joined the group of lawyers to protect the rights and interests of the relatives of the "Heavenly Hundred".

• 2016 – founded the NGO "Youth – Impulse of Changes". Forum and Khakaton "Impulse of Changes" was held in Kharkiv, jointly organized by the NGO and the USAID Program RADA within the "Model District" project.

• 2018 – Leader of the Youth wing of the Samopomich Union Party.

== Parliamentary activity ==
The 11th number in the list of the Samopomich Union Party during 2014 parliamentary elections in Ukraine.

Sotnyk again took part in the July 2019 Ukrainian parliamentary election, this time for the party Strength and Honor. But in the election the party won 3.82%, not enough to clear the 5% election threshold and thus no parliamentary seats.

=== Council of Europe ===
Olena Sotnyk is a permanent delegate to the Parliamentary Assembly of the Council of Europe and holds strong positions in this international body. She is the Vice-Chairman of the Committee on Legal Affairs and Human Rights, which had previously headed. In addition, mrs. Sotnyk is a member of the Committee on Political Affairs and Democracy, the Committee on the Election of Judges to the European Court of Human Rights, Sub-committee on Human Rights, Sub-committee on External Relations and Sub-committee on implementation of judgments of the European Court of Human Rights.

Activity in PACE:

– Head of observation mission on the presidential election in Turkey;

– Member of observation mission on the presidential election in Georgia;

– Member of observation mission on the parliamentary elections in Turkey, Bulgaria and Jordan.

Prepared reports:

– Observation of the early presidential and parliamentary elections in Turkey (24 June 2018);

Reporter on:

– Restrictions on NGO activities in Council of Europe member States.

Prepared Committee opinions:

- Follow-up to the report of the Independent Investigation Body on the allegations of corruption within the Parliamentary Assembly;

– Social services in Europe: legislation and practice of the removal of children from their families in Council of Europe member States;

– Media freedom as a prerequisite for democratic elections.

In addition, Olena actively participates in the life of the Inter-Parliamentary Union, where in the fall of 2018 was elected as a member of the Bureau of Women's Parliamentarians.

Mrs. Sotnyk also represents the Ukrainian side in a number of groups on commonwealth, in particular she is:

• Co-chair of the Inter-Parliamentary Relations Unit with Belgium

• Member of the Inter-Parliamentary Relations Unit with the United States

• Member of the Inter-Parliamentary Relations Unit with Canada

• Member of the Inter-Parliamentary Relations Unit with France

• Member of the Inter-Parliamentary Relations Unit with (Germany)

• Member of the Inter-Parliamentary Relations Unit with the United Kingdom

• Member of the Inter-Parliamentary Relations Unit with Switzerland

== Other achievements ==
Since 2016 Olena Sotnyk is a participant of the Model District project within the USAID Program RADA. The project aims to make communication between the MPs and Citizens more effective, thus improving the representation of public in the legislative process. Only seven Members of the Parliament have been selected to participate in the project.

She was included to the list of 100 the most successful women of Ukraine in 2019 according to the edition of "New Time". Also Olena Sotnyk was included to the list of successful women-lawyers in 2019 according to the edition of "Legal Newspaper".

Olena is co-author of a number of bills, which have received positive conclusions from the Council of Europe Commission on Democracy through Law (Venice Commission), in particular the Law of Ukraine "On the Judiciary and Status of Judges".

It is also worthwhile to note the draft Law of Ukraine "On the Principles of State Policy in the Field of European integration", an alternative draft of the Law of Ukraine "On Currency", which became the basis of currency legislation. She is a co-author for an alternative draft Law of Ukraine "On the Supreme Anticorruption Court of Ukraine".

After receiving the parliamentary mandate, Olena Sotnyk continues to protect the rights of citizens with active public positions. She is one of the initiators of the creation of the Interim Commission of Inquiry of the Verkhovna Rada on investigation of information on the attacks against Kateryna Handzyuk and other civic activists and the Interim Commission of Inquiry of the Verkhovna Rada on investigation of information on the interference in pre-trial investigation of crimes committed against participants in peaceful protest actions between November 2013 and February 2014.

In March 2019, Sotnyk became the first female who will represent Ukraine in the Yale World Fellows Program.
