= Surkis =

Surkis is a surname. Notable people with the surname include:

- Hryhoriy Surkis (born 1949), Ukrainian businessman
- Ihor Surkis (born 1958), Ukrainian businessman
- Mordechai Surkis (1908–1995), Israeli politician
