= Chesno =

Ukrainian political campaign

- Чесно
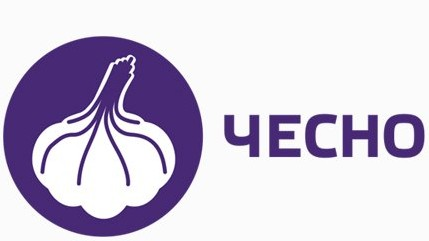
- Formation: 9 December 2011; 14 years ago
- Founded: 29 October 2011; 15 years ago
- Type: NGO
- Purpose: Political Transparency
- Location: Kyiv
- Region served: Ukraine
- Website: www.chesno.org

Chesno (Ukrainian: Чесно, lit. 'honestly, fairly') is a Ukrainian public campaign that emerged late 2011 to advance a fair election process. It is widely known for its critical analysis and evaluation of politicians and the Verkhovna Rada (parliament) in Ukraine. The organization provides a public familiarization of political culture and every individual legislator as well as candidates to the People's Deputies of Ukraine in the country.

Its logo is a clove of garlic, which was chosen as a "way for disinfection and fight with impure forces".

== History ==
The movement was started in late 2011 by a group of interested activists along with representatives of a partnership "New Citizen". The movement was founded on 29 October 2011 exactly a year before the next parliamentary elections in Ukraine during the public action "Let's filter the parliament in 24 hours" (Ukrainian: Фільтруємо парламент за 24 години). The purpose is to activate the society in order to cleanse the future parliament from the ignominious deputies. Journalist Svitlana Zalishchuk is one of the founders of the movement.

The public presentation of the movement took place on 9 December 2011, when Chesno members initiated the campaign "Filter the council" (Ukrainian: Фільтруй раду).

On 23 July 2012, Chesno published its first results of monitoring, according to which only three parliamentary corresponded to the virtue criteria. Those were the vice-chairman of the parliament Mykola Tomenko, Oleksandr Hudyma, and the newly elected former Minister of Economy (Fokin Government) Volodymyr Lanovyi.

On 16 October 2012, Chesno published its results of monitoring for the deputy candidates who run at the electoral districts of the 2012 Ukrainian parliamentary election. In the parliament elected in that election several deputies at the request of Chesno regularly report on their activities in parliament.

== Virtue criteria ==
Every parliamentary or prospective candidate is being evaluated by the "Chesnometer" that consists of several criteria of virtue.

- absence of facts of human rights and freedoms violations
- immutability of political position according to the will of voters
- no relation to corrupt acts
- transparency of declared income and assets and compliance of those with lifestyle
- personal voting in parliament
- participation in meetings of parliament and committees

== Values ==
- Openness
- Independence
- Trust
- Endurance and tolerance
- Transparency
- Networking
- Self-governance
- Consensus
- Goodwill

== Coordination board ==
- Internews-Ukraine
- United Actions Center UA
- Institute of Mass Information
- Committee of voters of Ukraine (CVU)
- Center of political studies and analysis
- Media Law Institute
- Ilko Kucheriv Fund "Democratic Initiatives"
- Souspilnist Foundation (Society)
- Anti-raider Union of Entrepreneurs of Ukraine
- People's Solidarity
- Ukrainian view
- Kholodny-yar Initiative (Cold-ravine)

== Principles ==
The following is a list of 16 development principles and organizational rules for the campaign "Filter the council".

== Funding ==
From 1 October 2011 till 31 October 2012, the amount of the financial aid provided received from donors by initiating organisations of the CHESNO campaign totalled USD 860,455. A financial audit was carried out of the use of funds. The audit was financed by the UNITER "Ukraine National Initiatives to Enhance Reforms" Project performed by PACT and supported by USAID, the Swedish International Development Agency (SIDA), the International Renaissance Foundation, OMIDYAR NETWORK FUND, and the International Foundation for Electoral Systems (IFES).
