= Ihor Sahach =

Ukrainian diplomat

Ihor Sahach Ігор Михайлович Сагач

Ambassador of Ukraine to NATO
- In office 2008–2010
- President: Viktor Yushchenko
- Preceded by: Kostyantyn Morozov
- Succeeded by: Ihor Dolhov

Ambassador of Ukraine to Norway
- In office 2004–2008
- President: Viktor Yushchenko
- Preceded by: Oleksandr Slipchenko
- Succeeded by: Oleksandr Tsvetkov

Ambassador of Ukraine to Sweden
- In office 1994–1997
- President: Leonid Kuchma
- Preceded by: Kostyantyn Masyk
- Succeeded by: Ihor Podolyev

Personal details
- Born: 19 May 1956 (age 70) Kyiv, Ukrainian Soviet Socialist Republic, Soviet Union
- Education: Kyiv University

Ihor Mychaiylovych Sahach (Ukrainian: Ігор Михайлович Сагач) (born 19 May 1956) is a Ukrainian diplomat.

== Education ==
Ihor Sahach graduated from Taras Shevchenko National University of Kyiv in 1978.

== Career ==
In 1978-1981 - he was specialist Counsellor for Economic Affairs of the Soviet Embassy in Ethiopia.

In 1982-1987 - he was junior researcher, senior laboratory Kiev Trade and Economic Institute.

In 1987-1993 - he was the 3rd secretary, 2nd secretary, 1st secretary of the Ministry of Foreign Affairs of Ukraine.

In 1993-1994 - Head of Department of Nordic and Baltic Ministry of Foreign Affairs of Ukraine.

From May 1994 to July 1997 - Charge d'Affaires of Ukraine in the Kingdom of Sweden, Counsellor of the Embassy of Ukraine in Finland.

In 1997-1998 - Deputy Head of European and transatlantic integration of the Ministry of Foreign Affairs of Ukraine.

In 1998-2001 - Deputy Chairman of the Foundation for Local Self-Government of Ukraine on international issues.

From 2001 - he was head of the United Nations and other International Organizations, Ministry of Foreign Affairs of Ukraine.

25 August 2004 - 15 January 2008 - Ambassador Extraordinary and Plenipotentiary of Ukraine in Norway.

On 15 January 2008 - 12 May 2010 - he was head of Mission of Ukraine to NATO.

On 19 March 2015 he was appointed ambassador of Ukraine in the Kingdom of Sweden.
