= Valeriy Stepanov =

Ukrainian army Lieutenant General

- Валерій Миколайович Степанов
- Born: Valeriy Mykolayovych Stepanov; 11 January 1946; Odesa, Soviet Union
- Died: 15 March 2008 (aged 62); Odesa, Ukraine
- Military career
- Allegiance: Soviet Union; Ukraine
- Branch: Ukrainian Ground Forces
- Service years: 1961-1994
- Rank: Lieutenant General
- Commands: Carpathian Military District

Valeriy Mykolayovych Stepanov (Ukrainian: Валерій Миколайович Степанов; 11 January 1946 - 15 March 2008), was an officer of the Soviet and later Ukrainian Armed Forces who had served as the first commander of the Carpathian Military District in independent Ukraine from 1992 to 1993.

== Biography ==
Valeriy Stepanov was born on 11 January 1946 in Odesa. In 1968, he graduated from the Kiev Higher Combined Arms Command School, and the Frunze Military Academy in 1976. He served as the commander of a motor rifle platoon and company in the Central Group of Forces, chief of staff and deputy regiment commander, commander of a motor rifle regiment and division in the forces of the Leningrad Military District, and commander of the 94th Guards Motor Rifle Division in the Group of Soviet Forces in Germany.

After graduating from the General Staff Academy in 1987, Stepanov became the chief of staff, first deputy commander of the 35th Army, and then commander of the 13th Combined Arms Army of the Carpathian Military District. On 28 January 1992, Stepanov was appointed the first commander of the Carpathian Military District in post-independence Ukraine. From 1993 to 1994, he was the deputy commander of the forces of the Odesa Military District for reforming the armed forces.

In September 1994, Stepanov was dismissed from Armed Forces of Ukraine. After his retirement, he worked as a department head and director of the Department of Defense Policy of Odesa City Council. He headed the Public Organization of the Association of Veterans of Senior Officers of the City of Odesa.

Stepanov died on 15 March 2008, and was buried in Odesa.
