= Halyna Yanchenko =

Ukrainian politician

- Галина Янченко
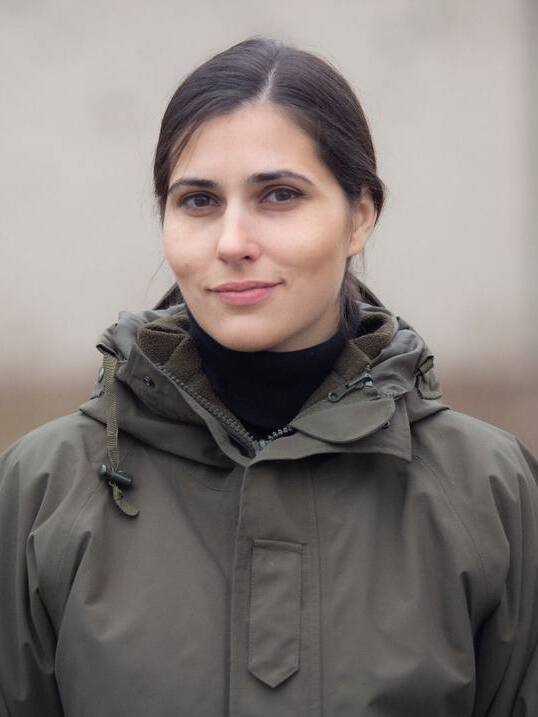
- Yanchenko in 2023

People's Deputy of Ukraine
- Incumbent
- Assumed office 29 August 2019

Personal details
- Born: Halyna Ihorivna Yanchenko; 29 April 1988 (age 37) Zhytomyr, Ukrainian SSR, Soviet Union
- Party: Democratic Alliance; Servant of the People
- Education: National University of Kyiv-Mohyla Academy, Stanford University
- Occupation: politician

Halyna Ihorivna Yanchenko (Ukrainian: Галина Ігорівна Янченко; born 29 April 1988) a Ukrainian anti-corruption activist, politician and People's Deputy of Ukraine. She was in elected to parliament in 2019 as number 5 of the election list of Servant of the People. She left the party in December 2022.

Since January 2022, Yanchenko has been a Secretary of the Office of the National Investment Council of Ukraine.

== Biography ==
While studying at school, Yanchenko was a participant of the Future Leaders Exchange (FLEX) Program, spending a year at Wichita Falls High School in Texas. She earned a master's degree in Sociology from the National University of Kyiv-Mohyla Academy.

In 2023, Yanchenko graduated from Stanford University on the Fisher Family Summer Fellows on Democracy and Development Program, organized by the Center for Democracy, Development, and Rule of Law (CDDRL).

=== Early political career ===
In 2008, Yanchenko became head of the local Kyiv branch of the party Democratic Alliance. From 2014 to 2015, she was a member of the Kyiv City Council for Democratic Alliance.

=== Parliamentary service ===
Yanchenko was elected to the Verkhovna Rada in 2019 as number 5 of the election list of Servant of the People political party. She was the Deputy Head of the Committee on Anti-Corruption Policy at the Verkhovna Rada. Yanchenko also co-chairs German-Ukrainian interparliamentary friendship group.

Since December 2022, Halyna Yanchenko has been the Member of the Committee on Economic Development. In addition, she chairs the Temporary Special Commission of the Verkhovna Rada on protection investor's rights (TSC) since June, 2020. The commission operates on reforming Ukrainian legislation for the formation of an effective investment policy. In the parliament, Halyna Yanchenko is the initiator of bills on strengthening the protection of property rights and business protection.

Yanchenko left the party of Servant of the People on 19 December 2022 in protest of the behavior of party leader Olena Shuliak.

=== Fighting corruption ===
Yanchenko has been chairing the NABU Public Oversight Council. After his election as President of Ukraine in 2019, Volodymyr Zelenskyy introduced Yanchenko as a member of "his team" responsible for "anti-corruption policy and digital decisions".

=== Government investment work ===
President Zelenskyy tapped her to lead government investment efforts. In January 2022 she was appointed a Secretary in the Office of the National Investment Council of Ukraine. In addition, she chairs the Temporary Special Commission of the Verkhovna Rada on protecting investor rights.

=== Training at Stanford ===
In mid 2023, the Center on Democracy, Development, and the Rule of Law (CDDRL) at Stanford University selected Yanchenko as one of six Ukrainians to participate in their new ten-week training program for Ukrainian practitioners and policymakers. This program, called "Strengthening Ukrainian Democracy and Development" (SU-DD), enrolls mid-career practitioners working on concrete projects that strengthen Ukrainian democracy, enhance human development, and promote good governance.

== Awards ==
2021 – «Statesman of the Year» award, winner in the nomination «The Best Business Initiative in the Public Sphere 2021» from the Kyiv School of Public Administration by Serhiy Nyzhny.

2021 – Honorary award of the I degree of NAAU (National Association of Advocates of Ukraine)

2021 – Special award from CEO Club Ukraine «On protection of the interests of Ukrainian business».

2020 – Thanks from the National Association of Advocates of Ukraine «For significant contribution to the development and strengthening the advocacy institution, high professionalism and active cooperation with lawyers of Ukraine».

== See also ==
- List of members of the parliament of Ukraine, 2019–24
