= Korotko Pro =

Ukrainian online newspaper

- Front cover of KP (2016)
- Type: Daily
- Format: Broadsheet
- Owner: Ukrainian Media Holding
- Publisher: Kepreyt Partners
- Editor-in-chief: Oksana Bohdanova (since 2011)
- Founded: 1996
- Language: Ukrainian; Russian (website only)
- Headquarters: Kyiv
- Circulation: Print circulation suspended in February 2022
- Sister newspapers: Komsomolskaya Pravda
- Website: kp.ua

Korotko Pro (Cyrillic: Коротко про; lit. 'Briefly about'), formerly KP in Ukraine (Ukrainian: КП в Україні; Russian: КП в Украине) is a Ukrainian newspaper in Kyiv, the nation's capital. It is a Ukrainian language newspaper. Following the 2022 Russian invasion of Ukraine the distribution of printed newspapers was stopped and the newspaper became an online publication.

== History ==
The first issue of the newspaper, then named Komsomolskaya Pravda in Ukraine (Russian: Комсомольская правда в Украине; Ukrainian: Комсомольська правда в Україні), was published on 4 October 1996. It was founded under a license from the Russian newspaper Komsomolskaya Pravda. The newspaper was exclusively in Russian.

The website version of the newspaper was launched in February 2001, the website address was kp.kiev.ua; in October 2007 it was moved to the address kp.ua.

In March 2009, the paper was awarded a "Newspaper of the Year 2008" award.

In 2013 the publication became part of the United Media Holding group, created by Boris Lozhkin and owned by Serhiy Kurchenko.

In 2014, and due to the Russian annexation of Crimea and the War in Donbas, the newspaper stopped being published in Crimea and in the Donetsk People's Republic and Luhansk People's Republic-controlled parts of the Donetsk and Luhansk Oblasts.

In order to comply with Ukrainian decommunization laws the newspaper changed its name from Komsomolskaya Pravda in Ukraine to KP, abbreviation from the publishing company Kepreyt Partners in January 2016. However, the newspaper stressed it was never a "mouthpiece" of the Komsomol, the youth wing of the Communist Party of the Soviet Union. Just prior to its name change the newspaper was published six times a week (and it continued to come out six times a week).

In 2018, the Institute of Mass Information and texty.org.ua analyzed the top 50 Ukrainian news sites to create a media rating of unreliability. KP in Ukraine was ranked 11th, with 81 reliable news items, 13 news items with unreliable sources of information, and 6 unreliable news items. Among these new, 10 had manipulative headlines, and 10 news used emotional manipulation. One fake news and one news item containing hate speech were also detected. At the same time, the parent publication Komsomolskaya Pravda took the first place in this anti-rating, with the largest number of fakes and news containing hate speech.

In September 2019 a court decision transferred the United Media Holding group and its entire portfolio to the state.

From March to June 2020, the newspaper was not published due to the COVID-19 pandemic.

The newspaper's printed version stopped being exclusively in Russian on 13 January 2022 due to the 2019 law on "On protecting the functioning of the Ukrainian language as the state language" coming into force. On 13 January 2022 the publication switched from Russian to Ukrainian in the printed version of the newspaper. The website of the newspaper got a Ukrainian-language version, next to the already being in existence Russian-language version, in September 2021 also because of the 2019 language law.

Following the 24 February 2022 Russian invasion of Ukraine the newspaper stopped the distribution of printed editions and the newspaper became an online publication.

On 29 December 2023, it was announced that the newspaper would be called "Korotko Pro" starting in 2024.

== See also ==
- Komsomolskaya Pravda
- List of newspapers in Ukraine
