= Serhiy Pashynskyi =

Ukrainian politician and statesman (born 1966)

- Сергій Пашинський
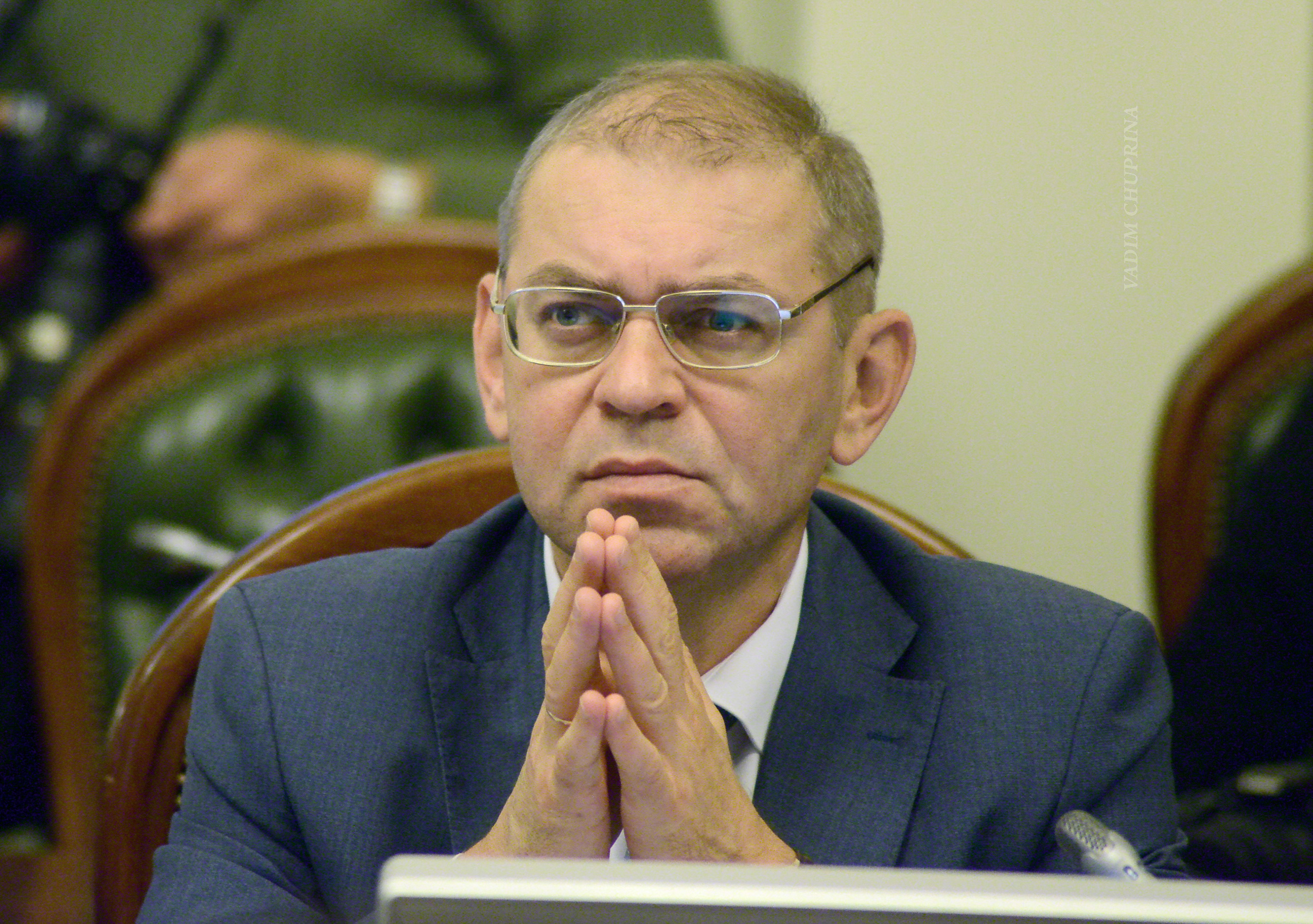
- Pashynskyi in 2016

Acting Head of the Presidential Administration of Ukraine
- In office 5 March 2014 – 10 June 2014
- President: Oleksandr Turchynov (acting)
- Preceded by: Oleh Rafalsky
- Succeeded by: Boris Lozhkin

Personal details
- Born: October 14, 1966 (age 59) Rivne Oblast, Ukrainian SSR, Soviet Union
- Party: People's Front (2014–present)
- Other political affiliations: Fatherland (2006–2014)
- Spouse: Ruslana
- Children: 2
- Education: National Pedagogical Dragomanov University

Serhiy Volodymyrovych Pashynskyi (Ukrainian: Сергій Володимирович Пашинський; born 14 October 1966) is a Ukrainian politician and statesman. He has been a people's deputy of Ukraine of four convocations and is the chairman of the Committee on National Security and Defense Council.

From 5 March to 20 June 2014, Pashynskyi was the acting head of the Presidential Administration of Ukraine.

== Biography ==
=== Early years ===
Pashynskyi was born on 14 October 1966 in the village of Zirne, Berezne Raion of the Rivne Oblast.

In 1978, Pashynskyi moved to the town of Korosten, Zhytomyr Oblast, where he graduated from high school No. 3.

In 1983, after graduating from the school, he worked as a turner at the KhimMash enterprise in Korosten.

In 1984 Pashynskyi entered the historical faculty of the Kyiv Pedagogical Institute named after A.M.Gorky (now - National Pedagogical Drahomanov University). While studying at the Institute he took part in public works, he also was a member of the Komsomol committee.

In 1985 Serhiy Pashynkyi started military service in the Soviet Army in the military unit No. 23296 in Kherson. After completing military service, he continues to study at the institute.

In 1991 he graduated from the institute and obtained a specialty "historian and social scientist".

=== Employment ===
From 1991 to 1998 he engaged in entrepreneurial activity in the field of trade, production and processing of agricultural products.

In 1998-1999, he was the president of CJSC "Trading House of Bank Ukraine".

In 1999-2000 Pashynskyi was a Deputy Chairman of the Board of the Oschadbank.

== Politics ==
In the 2002 Ukrainian parliamentary election, Pashynskyi ran for the Verkhovna Rada from the bloc of political parties "Against All", No. 12 in the electoral list. His candidacy was withdrawn.

In November 2002, the Prosecutor General of Ukraine charged Pashynskyi with embezzlement of USD 4 million committed in 1999-2000. Pashynskyi was also charged with fraudulent transactions in obtaining loans from banks. On 30 November 2002, Kyiv's Pechersky District Court authorized the detention of Pashynskyi. He was arrested on suspicion of embezzlement of funds of the Oschadbank, which were intended to compensate for Soviet deposits of Ukrainian citizens older 80 years. The charges were brought under art. 191, part 5, and art. 222, part 2 of the Criminal Code of Ukraine (misappropriation of another's property in especially large amounts through abuse of official position; fraud). On 6 February 2003, the Kyiv Court of Appeal released Pashynskyi on his own recognizance. According to Ukrainian media, Yulia Tymoshenko personally arrived at the Lukyanivska Prison to take Pashynskyi out.

In November 2002, Pashynskyi was placed in a detention facility. He was released in 2003. In 2004, the new administration of the Prosecutor General's Office of Ukraine dropped the charges against Pashynskyi.

During the second round of presidential elections in 2004 and the Orange Revolution, Pashynskyi worked for the candidate Victor Yushchenko in the electoral district No. 66 in Zhytomyr Oblast. The result of his work was the largest increase of votes for Yushchenko between the first and second rounds of elections among the regions of central and western Ukraine.

From February 2005, he was the advisor to the Prime Minister of Ukraine Yulia Tymoshenko. The Prime Minister designated Pashynkyi as general director of the State enterprise "Ukrreserv" and from August 2005 till January 2006 he worked actively on overcoming the crisis situation in food markets.

He was a deputy of the Verkhovna Rada of Ukraine of the 5th, 6th, 7th, and 8th convocations.

From 5 March to 10 June 2014, Pashynskyi was acting Head of the Presidential Administration of Ukraine. According to the Interrogation Report of the former Minister of Defense of Ukraine Ihor Tenyukh, on 23 March 2014, at the initiative of Pashynskyi and the former head of the National Guard Stepan Poltorak, a meeting of the NSDC was held. During the meeting, a final decision on the withdrawal of Ukrainian troops from the Crimea without resistance to the Russian army was made.

After the election of Petro Poroshenko as the President of Ukraine, Pashynskyi returned to the Verkhovna Rada.

In January 2015, Pashynskyi initiated the restriction of photo and video recording of meetings of the conciliatory council of the heads of the parliamentary factions and committees of the Verkhovna Rada. Pashynskyi said he does not want the meetings turn into "political talk shows." At the same time he supported audio fixation and called for the creation of regulations for the statements of the leaders of the factions and committees.

From 2014 to 6 October 2016, he was the head of the supervisory board of the State Concern Ukroboronprom. According to the report of the National Anti-Corruption Bureau of Ukraine, the company has developed a strong corruption system. Thanks to that system, officials at Ukroboronprom siphoned off funds from a $39 million contract to supply details for Antonov AN-32 aircraft to the Ministry of Defence of Iraq.

On 1 November 2018, Pashynskyi was included in the Russian sanctions list in connection with Ukraine's unfriendly actions towards citizens and legal entities of the Russian Federation.

In the 2019 Ukrainian parliamentary election he lost his parliamentary seat after losing his constituency.

== Controversies ==
=== Corporate raid of Zhytomyr confectionery factory ===
Pashynskyi was accused of planning a hostile takeover of the Zhytomyr candy company in 2015. Member of the supervisory board of the company, Denis Dolinsky, stated: "People's deputy Serhiy Pashynskyi and his business partner Serhiy Tyshchenko are preparing an attempt to raider seizure of the Zhytomyr confectionery factory. A corresponding illegal court decision was received by the judge of the Ternopil District Administrative Court N.I. Khodachkevich. This is not Pashinsky's first attempt to seize the factory." The company asked the authorities to help sort out the situation. Three days later, on 30 November, buses with so-called titushky arrived at the factory - it was a group of 200 sports people who were tasked to seize the enterprise by force. National Anti-Corruption Bureau of Ukraine launched an investigation into this case. On the night of 5 January 2016, the police detained 134 people who staged a mass brawl with shots near the enterprise. The president of the company, Ihor Boyko, also accused Pashynskyi and Tyshchenko of this attempt of a corporate raid.

=== Confrontation with Transparency International ===
On 16 July 2016, the head of the Ukrainian branch of the Transparency International, Andriy Marusov, was attacked twice by unknown persons, as a result a laptop with archive data was stolen. Marusov stated that these events were not an accident, since the attackers addressed him by name. He linked the robbery to recent statements by the Chief Military Prosecutor of Ukraine Anatolii Matios and deputies close to Pashynskyi who accused member of the board of Transparency International Ukraine, Vitaly Kasko, of "allegedly slowing down the investigation of [Serhiy] Kurchenko's corruption."

In July 2017, Transparency International appealed for Pashynskyi to refute false statements about failure of defense contracts. Earlier, TI demanded to disclose a Court decision, on the basis of which USD 1.5 billion were confiscated to the budget of Ukraine. This money was allegedly arrested on the accounts of former President of Ukraine Viktor Yanukovych and his entourage.

=== Purchase of military equipment ===
In April 2018, the website "NV" published an investigation in which it was claimed that the Ministry of Defense of Ukraine was involved in the allegedly inflated prices of outdated BMP-1 (produced in the 1980s) from the Polish company "Wtorplast", which received this equipment in the Czech Republic. It was claimed without evidence that Pashynskyi and the first deputy secretary of the National Security and Defense Council Oleg Gladkovskiy were involved in this.

Minister of Defence Stepan Poltorak in an interview with the BBC said that "The information is not true, because the Ministry of Defense bought military vehicles for $169,000. According the information I read in the magazine, there was about $205,000".

Representatives of the Polish supplier company came to the parliamentary hearings on the mentioned issue for explanations, but the editor-in-chief of the website "NV" Vitaly Sych did not appear despite the invitation. Pashynskyi and the Wtorplast company announced lawsuits against "NV" due to the damages caused by the publication.

== Criminal prosecution ==
=== Oschadbank case ===
In November 2002, the Prosecutor General of Ukraine accused Pashynskyi of stealing $4 million in 1999-2000, as well as committing fraudulent transactions in obtaining loans from other banks. On 30 November 2002, the Pechersky court of Kyiv, within the framework of the criminal case, issued a sanction for taking Pashynskyi into custody. He was arrested on suspicion of embezzling the funds of Sberbank of Ukraine, intended to compensate Soviet deposits to citizens who have reached the age of 80. Charges were raised under article 191, part 5, and article 222, part 2 of the Criminal Code of Ukraine (appropriation of someone else's property in especially large amounts by abuse of office; fraud). On 6 February 2003, the Appeal Court of Kyiv released Pashynskyi under a restriction of travel order. According to the Ukrayinska Pravda, Yulia Tymoshenko personally came to the Lukyanivska Prison to take out Pashynskyi, whom the investigation allegedly wanted to re-arrest.

=== New Year's Eve shooting (2016–2017) ===
On New Year's Eve from 2016 to 2017, Pashynskyi shot in the foot of a resident of the Kyiv's suburb Vyacheslav Khimikus. According to the deputy, he defended himself. Vyacheslav Khimikus claims that he struck the deputy with a bottle on the head after he sent the weapon to him. From a shot made with a distance of 15 cm, gunpowder burn remained on the leg of Khimikus. In addition, Pashynskyi didn't fired a warning shot. The surgerist who operated Khimikus confirmed that the shooting was done from the top down, because the bone fragments were displaced down from the pelvis.

On 26 July 2017, the Prosecutor General's Office closed the case against Pashynskyi, but on 13 December, Pechersky District Court of Kyiv ordered the resumption of the investigation into the criminal proceedings. The court recognized the decision of the investigator of the Prosecutor General as unlawful and quashed it. In May 2018, Pechersky Court ordered the Prosecutor General to investigate the disappearance of the video from the scene. On 29 May 2018, the GPU recognized the fact of the manipulation of video and entered information on this case into the Unified register of pre-trial investigations.

In October 2019 the State Bureau of Investigation opened an investigated into Pashynskyi for allegedly "causing grievous bodily harm to a citizen" during a shooting incident in 2016 in which Pashynskyi shot a man in the leg after allegedly being attacked by him (the person shot claimed it was vice-versa). On 7 October 2019, Pechersky District Court of Kyiv decided to detain Pashynskyi until 4 December 2019 (without bail). On 18 October, Court of Appeal upheld the decision to detain the former deputy.

On 18 March 2021 the Vasylkiv Raion Court of Kyiv Oblast acquitted Pashynskyi of the charge (of inflicting grievous bodily harm on Khimikus).

== Awards ==
Pashynskyi has two award weapons - Glock 19 pistol (28 March 2014) and Fort-224 assault rifle (copy of IWI Tavor 21) (14 October 2014).

== Earnings ==
In 2017, Pashynskyi declared a salary in the Verkhovna Rada of ₴239,973, compensation for the fulfilling deputy powers (₴252,825), a 2011 Mercedes-Benz S500 4Matic and 2007 Mercedes-Benz GL 450 4Matic, as well as the trailer for the Tracker Targa boats and the Targa 175 WT boat. He indicated in an electronic declaration a collection of 15 paintings and watches by Breguet and Chopard. As a People's Deputy, he received interest on deposits in Afbox Bank for a total of ₴111,753. Pashynskyi also had ₴1.7 million, US$120,000, and €90,000 in cash. In 2015, Pashinsky lent ₴3.5 million from Dmytro Oliynyk.

== Personal life ==
Serhiy Pashynskyi is married to Ruslana, couple has two sons.

The son of a politician, Anton Pashynskyi, is a graduate of the Kyiv National Economic University, a master's degree in international economics, and a serviceman of the National Guard of Ukraine. Head of the "SpetsTechnoExport" department — the second-largest Ukrainian state-owned foreign trade enterprise by turnover, which specializes in export and import of military and dual-purpose products and services globally, as well as on promoting innovations and military-technical cooperation, incorporated to the State Concern Ukroboronprom.

Political offices
Preceded by Oleh Rafalsky	Head of the Presidential Administration; 5 March June 2014 – 10 June 2014	Succeeded by Boris Lozhkin
