= Servant of the People =

Servant of the People Слуга народу
- Leader: Oleksandr Korniyenko
- De facto leader: Volodymyr Zelensky
- Parliamentary leader: Davyd Arakhamia
- Founder: Ivan Bakanov
- Founded: 2 December 2017
- Registered: 31 March 2018
- Headquarters: Novoselytsʹka 7, Kyiv
- Youth wing: Ze! Molodizhka
- Women's wing: Ze! Women
- Membership: 500–1,000 (2020 est.) (Note: According to party leader Oleksandr Kornienko in May 2020. He also stated that a third of the party's parliamentary faction was a member of the party.)
- Ideology: Liberalism (Ukrainian); Valence populism; Ukrainian nationalism
- Political position: Centre
- European affiliation: ALDE Party (Note: Servant of the People delegates to the Parliamentary Assembly of the Council of Europe instead sit with the European Conservatives, Patriots & Affiliates.)
- International affiliation: Liberal International
- Colours: Green
- Verkhovna Rada: 227 / 450
- Regions: 6,402 / 43,122

Website
- sluga-narodu.com

Servant of the People (Ukrainian: Слуга народу, romanized: Sluha narodu, Ukrainian pronunciation: [slʊˈɦɑ nɐˈrɔdʊ]; SN) is a liberal, centrist, pro-European political party in Ukraine. Since both the 2019 Ukrainian presidential election and the 2019 Ukrainian parliamentary election, it has been the ruling political party in Ukraine. It is best known for being the political party of President Volodymyr Zelenskyy, who leads the party de facto. It is currently headed by Oleksandr Korniyenko.

The party is named after the popular Ukrainian TV series Servant of the People, in which Zelenskyy played a fictional Ukrainian president. It was formed in late 2017 and was officially registered on 31 March 2018 on the basis of the previously registered Party of Decisive Changes. In the 2019 parliamentary election the party won 124 seats on the nationwide party list and 130 constituency seats.

== History ==
=== Founding ===
The Servant of the People party is the successor of the Party of Decisive Change (Ukrainian: Партія рішучих змін, romanized: Partiia rishuchykh zmin) that existed since April 2016 and was founded by Eugene Yurdiga.

The party was renamed in December 2017 after the eponymous Ukrainian hit TV series Servant of the People that starred Volodymyr Zelenskyy and was made by his TV production company Kvartal 95. The rebranded/renamed party's first leader was the CEO of Kvartal 95 Ivan Bakanov. At the time Kvartal 95 created the party, they claimed it was important to do so to prevent others from stealing the name of the eponymous series for "cynical political purposes". According to Zelenskyy, in the summer of 2017, "some rogues" had almost registered a party called "Servant of the People" and that because of this Kvartal 95 had registered their Servant of the People party so voters would not be misled to think they would vote for a party that was not related to the TV series of the same name. Early in 2018, Zelenskyy stated that the party was "not yet a political project", and said about its future: "Let's see".

Former logo of Servant of the People. It reads Ze! partiya Sluha Narodu

In December 2017, 4% of Ukrainians polled by the Ilko Kucheriv Democratic Initiatives Foundation and the Razumkov Center declared their readiness to vote for a party named "Servant of the People" in parliamentary elections, and in May 2018 this number had grown to 5% (the minimum necessary to pass Ukraine's election threshold). When democracy watchdog Chesno tried to contact Zelenskyy and party representatives in September 2018 in an attempt to ask if the party would take part in elections, a spokeswoman for Kvartal 95 responded "Unfortunately, party representatives are unable to comment on your request. There is currently no information that might be of interest to you." The press service of Kvartal 95 could not provide Chesno a picture of party leader Bakanov. Chesno was able to find out that the leadership of the party only consisted of people related to Kvartal 95.

Billboards advertising "Servants of the People" appeared on the streets of Ukrainian cities in November 2018. Zelenskyy later admitted that these billboards were legally only advertising the third season of the TV series "Servant of the People" but were also part of his election campaign so his campaign could "save a lot of money". The party's first financiers were either NGOs that did not have to report the origins of their donations or companies that all changed their addresses in the same week, leading Chesno to believe that these companies were interconnected. Almost all of the 2018 funds were received on the eve of Zelenskyy's 2019 New Year's speech in which he announced his candidacy in the 2019 Ukrainian presidential election.

=== Party winning the 2019 presidential and parliamentary election ===
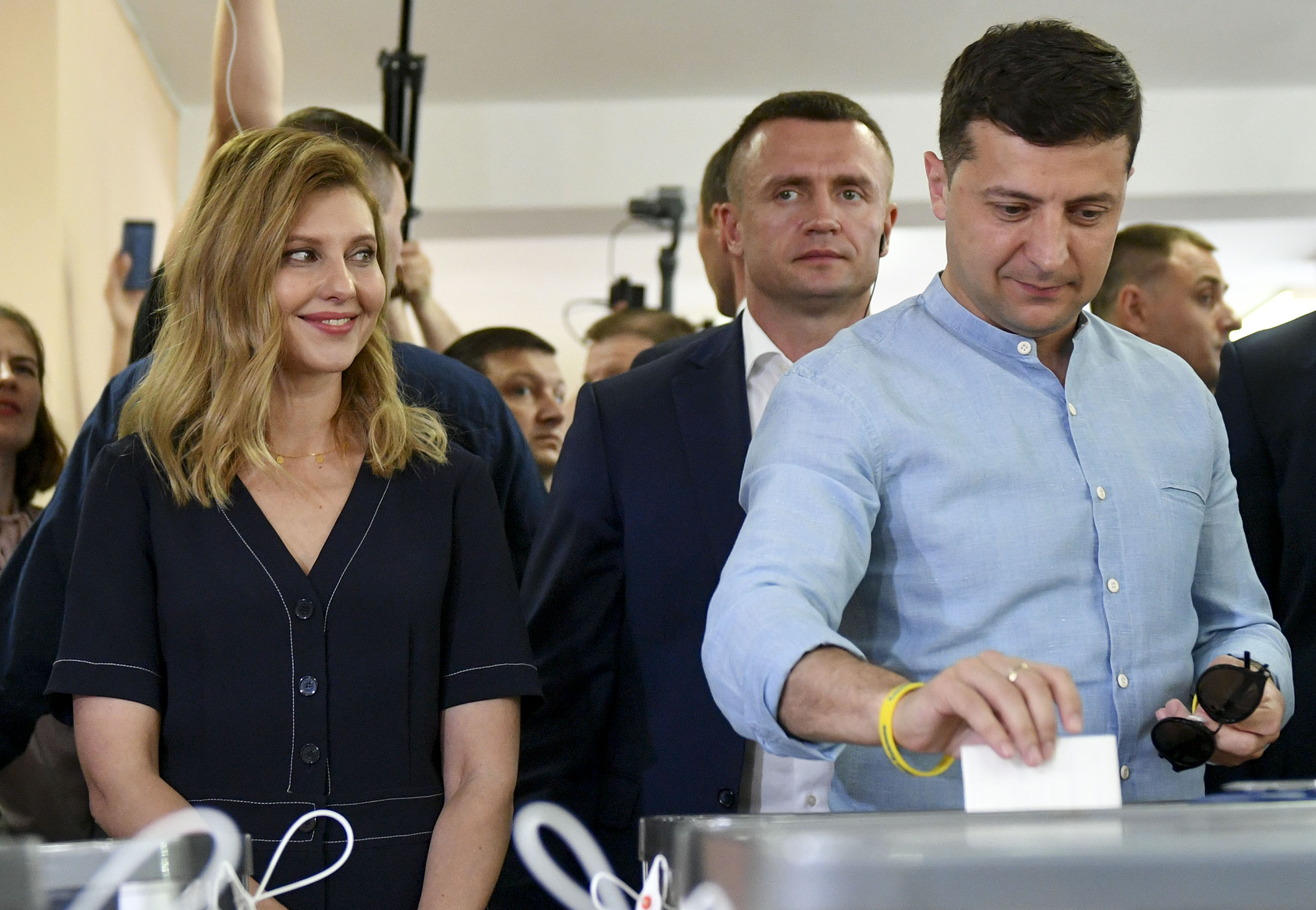
Volodymyr Zelenskyy votes in 2019.

In late December 2018, Zelenskyy was declared a presidential candidate from the party at the 2019 presidential election. While lagging behind in January 2019, Zelenskyy began to lead the polls by March. He would go on to win the first round of the presidential elections, taking first place and moving on to the run off against incumbent President Poroshenko on 21 April 2019, winning the election with over 73% of the votes cast. Zelenskyy stated that the party would enter a coalition government with neither the Petro Poroshenko Bloc nor Opposition Platform — For Life.

In his inauguration speech to parliament on 20 May 2019, President Zelenskyy announced the dissolution of parliament; he issued a decree for this the next day, as well as for an early election to be held on 21 July 2019. On 27 May 2019 Dmytro Razumkov was appointed as party chairman in place of Ivan Bakanov. Oleksandr Kornienko had been made head of the party's election headquarters, and Mykhailo Fedorov was installed as the party's chief of digital strategies. On 2 June 2019, the registration of potential candidates to run for the party in majority constituencies during the 2019 Ukrainian parliamentary election ended. Party leader Razumkov assured on 7 June 2019 that no incumbent MPs would be on the party list for the 2019 parliamentary election, but that the election list would consist of "new ambitious politicians".

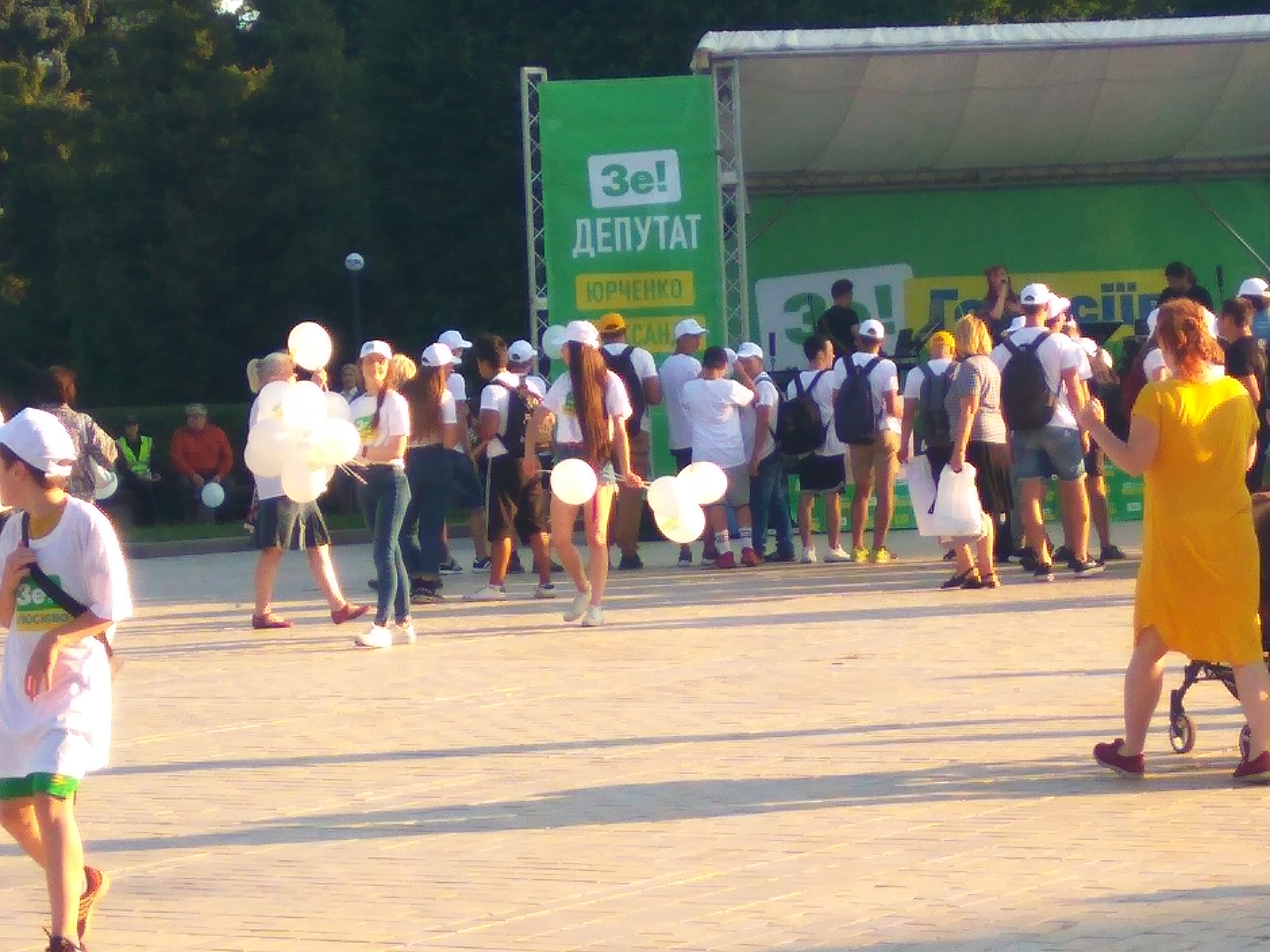
Pre-election concert held for a Servant of the People parliamentary candidate

The party held its first congress on 9 June 2019. It took place in Kyiv's Hryshko National Botanical Garden and was attended by President Zelenskyy and party leader Razumkov, among others. During the congress, the first names of the party's majority constituency candidates and the 97 candidates of the nationwide closed party list were made public. Well-known names in the nationwide party list were: Olympic athletes Olha Saladukha, Vadym Gutzeit, Zhan Beleniuk and long-term CEO of 1+1 Media Group Oleksandr Tkachenko. Three days later, Gutzeit and two other candidates had withdrawn themselves from the election, whilst a fourth was excluded from the list "after additional checks".

During the post-primaries, press and activists highlighted the most controversial representatives of the party, such as Oleksandr Dubinsky and Max Buzhanskiy. Neither of them were withdrawn from the final list of the party after the registration deadlines. (Note: On 21 June 2019 Ukrainian media reported that a businessman who had been a suspect in various embezzlement cases was a candidate for the party in a majority constituency.) The party excluded seven candidates from its list on 7 July 2019; five candidates were removed "as a result of information submitted [to the party] via the website and chat bot", whilst two others requested to be removed from the list, including the No. 31 candidate. On 19 July 2019, the leader of the Movement of New Forces party Mikheil Saakashvili called on his supporters to vote for the Servant of the People party at the parliamentary election.

In the (21 July) 2019 parliamentary election, the top ten party candidates were Dmytro Razumkov, Ruslan Stefanchuk, Iryna Venediktova, Davyd Arakhamia, Halyna Yanchenko, Mykhailo Fedorov, Oleksandr Kornienko, Anastasia Krasnosilska, Oleksandr Tkachenko and Zhan Beleniuk. In the election the party won 124 seats on the nationwide party list (43.16% of the votes) and 130 constituency seats. Several members of the political party UKROP (a party that has openly been supported by Ukrainian oligarch Ihor Kolomoyskyi) won constituency seats as candidates for Servant of the People (the two parties had no formal allegiance). In parliament, Davyd Arakhamia became the party's faction leader.

=== Party since winning the 2019 parliamentary election ===
On 11 November 2019, Oleksandr Korniyenko replaced Razumkov as party chairman. The party won about 25% of the votes in December 2019 local United territorial community elections (non-aligned candidates gained 44% of the votes). In June 2020, the party started to create its local organisation by appointing "cell leaders". In May 2020 the party had no official registered local branch. (Note: Party leader Oleksandr Kornienko stated, in a September 2020 interview, that in March–April local branches had been planned to be created but that this was disrupted by the COVID-19 pandemic. Kornienko also claimed that "the real party building will begin after the October 2020 local elections with those who will win them.")

In the 2020 Ukrainian local elections, the party won more seats than the other parties participating; 17.59% of local seats were won by the party. In total, the party nominated more than 23,000 candidates for local councils. Observers pointed out that the party (as other national parties) did suffer setbacks in Ukraine's largest cities across the country, including the capital Kyiv. In Kyiv, the party's mayoral candidate Iryna Vereshchuk and the party itself finished in fifth place. This was despite the fact that in the 2019 parliamentary election Servant of the People was the most popular party among Kyivites with 36.46%. 225 Servant of the People candidates (30.74% of all elected mayors nominated by a political party) were elected village, town or city mayors. Independent candidates won 661 mayoral elections. Although the party had not allowed incumbent MPs but only "new ambitious politicians" to be their candidate in the 2019 parliamentary election, in the 2020 Ukrainian local elections Servant of the People candidates were incumbent mayors and local council members and (other) former members of Party of Regions, Batkivshchyna, Petro Poroshenko Bloc and other political parties. In elections held in places with a population of less than 10,000 voters, the party won two seats.

In the spring of 2021, the party created a youth wing called "Ze! Molodizhka" ("Ze! Youth"). The party did not nominate a candidate for the October 2021 snap mayoral election in Kharkiv (the second-largest city of Ukraine). From 2019 to October 2021 nine deputies had been expelled from the faction and Dmytro Razumkov did not return to the faction after his removal from post as Chairman of parliament on 7 October 2021. Razumkov was replaced by Servant of the People member Ruslan Stefanchuk. Early November 2024 the party had a faction of 233 people's deputies left of the 254 seats that they had won in the 2019 parliamentary election.

According to research published by NGO Chesno on 12 November 2024 in 14% of all votes the party secured on its own the votes. Chesno found that the unity in voting among the party MP's began to decline rapidly after the March 2020 installation of the Shmyhal Government. Online newspaper Ukrainska Pravda stated in December 2021 that the party de facto had no majority in parliament anymore since it could only rely on 210 of its deputies during important votes, while any bill required 226 votes to pass. Following the February 2022 Russian invasion of Ukraine (and until November 2024) Chesno found only 16 votes where 226 (or more) party members voted "for". The last time being in February 2023. On 28 February 2022, the party was granted affiliate status by the Alliance of Liberals and Democrats for Europe Party.

== Ideology and position ==
It is positioned in the centre on the political spectrum, while its political ideology has been described as populist, as well as liberal. It has been described as a valence populist party.

On 23 May 2019, Ruslan Stefanchuk, Zelenskyy's representative in the Verkhovna Rada, announced that the party had chosen libertarianism as its core ideology. On 3 June 2019, however, the head of the party's election office Oleksandr Kornienko claimed, "go 20km or 100km out of Kyiv, and nobody will understand the issue of ideology there, who is right, left or centre here. The party will have its manifesto on its website, it will explain everything." After Kornienko was elected as head of the party in early November 2019, he stated that "libertarianism", the then party ideology of economic liberalism, would be changed, which was "needed to find a compromise within the party". He claimed that the new party ideology "will be something between liberal and socialist views". At the February 2020 Party Congress, Kornienko stated that the party's ideology is "Ukrainian centrism". According to him, this is an ideology that "denies political extremes and radicalism. But it is creative centrism."

In the election program for the 2019 parliamentary election, the party stated, "we will introduce the most favored regime for foreign investors of Ukrainian origin." It also promised to introduce "a mechanism for withdrawing deputies who have lost the confidence of the voters". The program also puts forward a number of direct democracy and anti-corruption proposals. The party has also vowed to expand Ukraine's cooperation with the European Union and NATO. The party also claimed that its key goal is to achieve a higher than average European income and quality of life for Ukrainians. (Note: In an interview in April 2019, party leader Zelenskyy stated that he supported the free distribution of medical cannabis, was a supporter of free abortion in Ukraine and would like to see the legalisation of prostitution and gambling in Ukraine. He spoke out against the legalization of weapons. None of these ideas were to be found in the party election program for the 2019 parliamentary election. The program instead promises to legally regulate the right to own weapons.)

In early July 2019, Ruslan Stefanchuk, number two in the party's election list, expressed his belief that Ukrainian language should be promoted (in a process of "Ukrainization") but only "quite mildly" and that "one needs to fight for the language to provide quality. Neither by bans, nor by persecution, but only by equality. When Ukrainian language content becomes more interesting and higher quality, then we will absolutely have another attitude. Meanwhile, the state should work out all mechanisms for that", he said.

== Leadership ==
=== Party chairs ===
- Ivan Bakanov (2017–2019)
- Dmytro Razumkov (2019)
- Oleksandr Korniyenko (2019–2021, 2025–present)
- Olena Shuliak (2021–2025)

== Election results ==
=== Verkhovna Rada ===
Results of the 2019 Verkhovna Rada elections

Verkhovna Rada
Election	Leader	Party-list			Constituency /total	Overall seats won	+/–	Position	Result
Election	Leader	Popular vote	%	Seats /total	Constituency /total	Overall seats won	+/–	Position	Result
2019	Dmytro Razumkov	6,307,793	43.16%	124/225	130/199	254 / 450	New	1st	Majority government

=== Presidential elections ===
Presidency of Ukraine
Election year	Candidate	First Round		Second Round		Result
Election year	Candidate	# of overall votes	% of overall vote	# of overall votes	% of overall vote	Result
2019	Volodymyr Zelenskyy	5,714,034	30.24%	13,541,528	73.22%	Elected ✓

=== Local councils ===
Election	Performance				Rank
Election	%	± pp	Seats	+/–	Rank
2020	15.09%	New	6,402 / 43,122	New	2nd
