= UMH group =

International multimedia group based in Ukraine

United Media Holding group
- Company type: Private
- Industry: Media
- Founded: 1995
- Headquarters: Kyiv, Ukraine
- Key people: Boris Lozhkin (founder and president), Serhiy Kurchenko (owner); Olena Bondarenko (supervisory board director)
- Products: Magazines, internet websites, radio
- Number of employees: 4400
- Website: http://www.umh.com.ua

UMH group (United Media Holding group) is an international multimedia group. It controls a portfolio of over 50 brands in Internet, radio and press markets, covering news, politics, business, sports, fashion, celebrity and TV. The portfolio includes over a dozen owned and licensed media brands, chiefly Forbes Ukraine and Vogue Ukraine (there is a strategic agreement concluded with Conde Nast publishers that allows UMH group develop a number of projects within the territory of Ukraine).

UMH ranks 15th among largest media companies operating in former Soviet republics.

The company’s stock trades on the Frankfurt Stock Exchange. UMH group is a WAN-IFRA member.

== History ==
The holding company was founded in late 1990s by Boris Lozhkin, who remained until 2014 its president and principal shareholder. On the basis of “Telenedelya” (“TV week”) newspaper, published since 1994, in 2013 UMH joined top ten largest printed media brands in the ex-Soviet area, is the leader among celebrity niche media in Ukraine and ranks sixth by readership volume in CIS countries).

In 1995 through 1998 he bought licenses for such famous brands as “Argumenty i Fakty” (“Arguments and facts”), “Komsomolskaya Pravda” (“Komsomol truth”) and “Football” magazine.

In 2000 UMH bought its first radio station, then another two years later; in 2004 the radio group had four network stations. Currently it has seven, plus niche leading channel “Menu TV”, purchased in 2008. UMH radio group is one of the two major actors in the Ukrainian radio market.

In 2000 UMH group became a multimedia structure when first radio station joined the project portfolio. In two more years there was another one and in 2004 radio group already accounted for four network stations. Currently the group has seven, as well as the niche leading channel “Menu TV” purchased in 2008. UMH radio group is one of the two major actors in Ukrainian radio market.

In 2003 UMH entered the Russian market. In a couple of years the Russian unit of the company – “Populyarnaya pressa” (“Popular press”) publishing house – built one of the broadest regional networks with divisions in 30 cities. Today the company ranks among the top 10 Russia’s publishing houses and controls eight brands. Total circulation of the publishers’ publications in Russia constitutes 42.5 million copies.

Given the rapid development of digital technologies, the internet became an important priority of the UMH group business development. By dint of projects purchased, as well as development of its own, the company formed a portfolio of over fifteen projects. In terms of reach, UMH group ranks among the top five companies that operate in the Ukrainian market. This list also includes such international corporations as Google, Mail.Ru and Yandex.

In 2008 UMH group was the first Ukrainian media company to place private stocks on the Frankfurt Stock Exchange gaining $45 million US for 15% of its stock, and achieving a capitalization of $300 million. Ukrainian investment group Concorde Capital performed the role of the exclusive financial advisor and facilitator of the stock placement.

In 2010 the president of UMH, Boris Lozhkin concluded strategic agreements with well-known American publishing houses Forbes Media and Conde Nast that allowed him to publish Forbes in Ukraine (published since 2011), Vogue Ukraine (first edition was issued in early 2013) and other magazines.

In 2011 UMH group organized the 64th World Newspaper Congress in Kyiv. President of Ukraine Viktor Yanukovych delivered the keynote speech for the event, which took place in August 2011.

In June 2013 Boris Lozhkin announced the sale of 98% of UMH stock to the VETEK group of companies. The new owner became Serhiy Kurchenko. Expert estimation of the transaction value in 2013 published in the press constituted $450–500 million. According to Forbes.ua estimations, the sale of UMH group ranks among the top ten largest M&A deals of the first semester of 2013. In the total list the UMH transaction ranks fourth.

In December 2017 Kyiv's Pecherskyi District Court seized the corporate and intellectual rights along with part of the real estate owned by the holding. According to the court, the assets are related to the crimes committed by former President Yanukovych and are involved in misappropriation of property or embezzlement via abuse of office by an organized group, as well as money laundering. Owner Serhiy Kurchenko left Ukraine in February 2014 following the 2014 Ukrainian revolution that ousted President Yanukovych and his current whereabouts are unknown. Since the following month Kurchenko has been on the international wanted list. Since then his property and other assets have been frozen.

== Statistics ==
Target markets of the company are adult Russian-speaking population of the former Soviet republics that constitutes about 155 million persons where the company currently covers 12% of the audience which is 18.6 million persons.

Head office of the holding company is situated in Kyiv. Office of the “Popularnaya pressa” publisher’s house is situated in Moscow. There are offices and representations in 43 Ukrainian and Russian cities. 4400 employees currently work in the company in both Ukraine and Russia.

== Activity indicators ==
At year-end 2012 net earnings constituted 151.6 million US Dollars, EBITDA and net profit – 28.7 and 16.3 million US Dollars respectively.

Year	2009	2010	2011	2012
Revenue	88 472	112 586	137 637	151 648
EBITDA	6 340	15 381	20 500	28 726
Net profit	5 087	1 236	3 434	16 336

== Media assets ==
Internet and digital:

- Korrespondent.net
- Football.ua
- Bigmir) net
- I.ua
- Tochka.net
- Dengi.ua
- KP.ua
- kolobok.ua
- Aif.ua
- Tv.ua
- Vgorode.ua
- iSport.ua
- Gloss.ua
- Smak.ua

Radio:

- Авторадио
- Ретро FM
- NRJ
- Голос Столицы (defunct on November 1, 2019)
- Lounge FM
- Джем FM
- Радио Пятница
- Наше радио (sold to TAVR Media in 2020)

Publishing:

- Корреспондент
- Теленеделя
- Футбол
- Комсомольская правда в Украине
- Аргументы и факты
- За рулём
