= Serhiy Kurchenko =

Ukrainian businessman

- Born: September 21, 1985 (age 40); Ukrainian SSR, Soviet Union
- Occupation: Businessman
- Known for: Former president of FC Metalist Kharkiv

Serhiy Vitaliiovych Kurchenko (Ukrainian: Сергі́й Віта́лійович Ку́рченко, Russian: Сергей Витальевич Курченко, romanized: Sergei Vitalievich Kurchenko, born 21 September 1985) is a former Ukrainian, Russian businessman and founder/owner of the group of companies "Gas Ukraine 2009" specializing in trading of liquefied natural gas. Kurchenko is also the former owner and president of FC Metalist Kharkiv and the Ukrainian Media Holding group. Kurchenko left Ukraine in February 2014 for Russia. Since March 2014 Kurchenko has been on the international wanted list, and his property and other assets have been arrested. Until the end of 2012 information about Kurchenko was scarce and it surfaced with a scandal around the sale of FC Metalist Kharkiv. In October 2017, a Ukrainian court confiscated Metalist Kharkiv from Kurchenko and placed it under state property.

Currently Kurchenko lives in Moscow and handles from there his businesses in Russian occupied regions of Donbas and Crimea under the auspices of the FSB.

== Early life and education ==
Kurchenko was born 21 September 1985 into a low-income family in Kharkiv, Saltivka residential neighborhood. From 1992 to 2002 he attended secondary school number 122. From 2002 to 2006 he attended National Technical University Kharkiv Polytechnic Institute studying Economics and Entrepreneurship. He graduated with a Bachelor in Accounting and Auditing, followed by studies in "Intellectual Property" from 2006 to 2008 resulting in a master's degree. From 2009 to 2011 he attended National University Yaroslav the Wise Law Academy of Ukraine graduating with a law degree. Teachers and classmates described him as a closed and restrained person. Employees described him as communicable, but not striking.

== Career ==
Kurchenko started working as a courier for Naftogaz, Ukraine's national oil and gas company, when he was 16. Per his official biography he advanced to deputy commercial director, by reorganizing the wholesale of liquefied gas within two years. Implementation of his projects increased Ekspogaz's profits. Kurchenko left Ekspogaz and started his own business in 2005 at the age of 19 years.

His official biography on "Metalist" states "The experience and attracted financing allowed him to carry out a few successful investment projects in the primary market building and the land market in the Kharkiv region. From 2005 to 2008, prior to the 2008 financial crisis, prices on the real estate market in Ukraine rose more than 30% per year." The biography does not mention any projects or the name of his firm.

=== Gaz Ukraine 2009 ===
In 2009, Kurchenko founded a group of companies named "Gas Ukraine 2009". The group includes 55 companies of diverse activities, and all are registered in Kharkiv region and the Autonomous Republic of Crimea.

The group's main activity is the sale of petroleum products, implementation of liquefied gas and public procurement. According to Yuriy Syrotyuk, the deputy of Svoboda party, Gaz Ukraine 2009 monopolized the Ukrainian liquefied gas market and smuggled gasoline with interrupted transit and fake exports schemes in 2009.

=== FC Metalist ===
In December 2012, Oleksandr Yaroslavsky sold the football club FC Metalist Kharkiv to Kurchenko. The sale appeared hurried and was realized against the background of the conflict between the government of Kharkiv and the former co-owner of the Metalist stadium. Per the FC Metalist press-office Kurchenko met with head coach Myron Markevich, General Director Sergei Volik and Sport Director Eugene Krasnikov on 30 December 2012, in the office of Gas Ukraine 2009 in Kyiv.

Ivan Savvidis, the controlling shareholder of Greek FC PAOK, suggested that Kurchenko was not the owner of FC Metalist. When a journalist for The View newspaper asked about a game of chess with the owner of Metalist, Savvidis responded that he plays only with the real owners. He said, "Who is the true owner of Metalist? Come on, I know a little more than you think."

Early October 2017, a Ukrainian court confiscated Metalist Kharkiv from Kurchenko and placed it under state property.

=== VETEK group of companies ===
On 22 February 2013, the press-service of the group of companies "Gas Ukraine 2009" announced the formation of a new group of companies "East European Energy Company." (VETEK) consisting of two major companies LLC "VETEK" and LLC "VETEK." and others, with Kurchenko controlling the development strategy of the new group.

On 26 February 2013, the VETEK group of companies bought 99.6% of the Odesa refinery's shares from Lukoil. Despite the plant's opening ceremony on 29 March 2013 it has not been operating.

On 21 June 2013, VETEK group announced the purchase of Ukrainian Media Holding (UMH group) which manages more than 50 media brands in Ukraine, including Forbes, Vogue, Reporter, Focus (Ukrainian magazine), Telenedelya (TV week), i.ua, bigmir.net (Ukrainian web portal), football.ua, Retro FM, radio, Europa Plus, AvtoRadio, Arguments and Facts, Komsomolskaya Pravda in Ukraine and others, with 4,000 employees in 42 offices in Russia and Ukraine at a 2011 revenue of $138 million. Although the founder of UMH, Boris Lozhkin, declared that the transaction was of a commercial nature, some commentators suggested that the information field for 2015 would be cleared for the benefit of the VETEK group. The chief editor of Forbes Ukraine, Vladimir Fedorin, suspected that the sale of Forbes Ukraine would end it in its current form and that the buyer intended to silence journalists before the presidential election, to whitewash his own reputation, or use the edition to resolve the issues that do not have anything to do with the media business.

On 23 August 2013, Kurchenko met with the editors of Ukrainian Media Holding and presented a new structure named VETEK Media. Kurchenko stated, "VETEK Media is one of the directions of our business. We will continue our development in Ukraine, Russia and Europe. Today the main asset of media direction is UMH."

On 17 July 2013, Kurchenko bought 80% of the shares Brockbusinessbank VETEK. The bank's Chief of its board of directors is Boris Timonkin, and Igor Franzkevich is chairman of the board. Brokbusinessbank manages a significant amount of payroll projects, particularly the accounts by the Ukrainian Interior Ministry.

On 28 August 2013, Kurchenko bought the Metalist stadium. He paid ₴674,522,000, which was ₴84 more than the start price. The club stated, "The only participant of the contest was SK Metalist Stadium, which is part of the football club Metalist, owned by Serhiy Kurchenko."

Forbes Media revoked the local publication license to Forbes Ukraine in August 2015.

In December 2017 Kyiv's Pechersky District Court seized corporate and intellectual rights along with part of the real estate owned by UMH holding. According to court the assets are related to the crimes committed by former president Viktor Yanukovych and are involved in misappropriation of property or embezzlement via abuse of office by an organized group, as well as money laundering.

=== Corruption allegations ===
Media have described Kurchenko as the "wizard of gaz", the "gas king of Ukraine" and "business sensation of Ukraine 2012". He gives no interviews, no live comments, and makes no appearances on open business forums, releasing only prepared press releases.

According to investigative journalists, Kurchenko's achievements in the trade of liquefied natural gas, oil products and products for the oil and gas industry resulted from his connections to high-ranking officials in the government of Ukraine, namely Artem Pshonka, the son of former Prosecutor General of Ukraine and Party of regions MP Viktor Pshonka and Oleksandr Yanukovych, the eldest son of former president Viktor Yanukovych. Further connections are Serhiy Arbuzov, first Vice Prime Minister of Ukraine and Alexander Klimenko, Ministry of Finance (Ukraine). Kurchenko has denied these connections. Dmitry Firtash's companies allegedly provided cheap gas for Kurchenko to sell.

In 2019, Ukrainian prosecutors brought charges against Kurchenko and the Ukrainian firm Investment Capital Ukraine (ICU), for their involvement in money laundering and embezzlement of public funds. According to Ukrainian media reports, ICU acted as a broker in the purchase of government bonds worth over 2 billion UAH, through the use of Cypriot offshore entities.

=== In exile ===
Following the 22 February 2014 impeachment of former president Viktor Yanukovych, Kurchenko and 17 other individuals like relatives, prominent businessmen and former senior officials considered close to Yanukovich became subject of a European Union asset freeze effective 6 March 2014. Kurchenko had left Ukraine the previous month and moved to Russia; his press spokesman released a statement to the Financial Times saying, "I am an honest Ukrainian businessman. I am ready to provide all the necessary documents and to give any assistance to the EU inspection bodies in order to prove my innocence." Later it was revealed that he left for Russia. A warrant for his arrest was issued in Ukraine on 20 March 2014. Since the same month Kurchenko has been on the international wanted list. Since then his property and other assets have been seized. He was also put on the US and EU sanctions list.

According to Ukraine's general prosecutor, Kurchenko is under investigation for failing to pay $130 million in tax and the theft of $180 million from bank investors. He is also accused of buying liquefied gas at specialized auctions at a discounted price (allegedly to provide for the needs of the public). According to Ukrainian prosecutors this liquefied gas was then sold to Kurchenko-controlled business entities at market prices.

In December 2017 the National Police of Ukraine arrested Mikheil Saakashvili accusing him of being financed by a "criminal group" linked to Yanukovych and Kurchenko. It was claimed that this group was orchestrating a Russian government backed campaign to seize power in Ukraine.

According to Ukrainian and Russian media Kurchenko owns the coal company Vneshtorgservis in Ukraine's separatist entities, the Donetsk People's Republic and Luhansk People's Republic. It has been reported that this company owes massive debts to local coal mines and other local companies. Kurchenko moved to luxurious are of Rublyovka, near Moscow, where he has a mansion worth of 2.1 billion rubles. In 2017, Kurchenko had already an active business life in Moscow visited and periodically visited the presidential administration and the Russian government, the offices of Rosneft, Lukoil, Gazprombank, VTB, the First Czech-Russian Bank, Roscosmos. His office located in Moscow City. He took active participation in "Committee for the Rescue of Ukraine" and met regularly former pro-Russian deputies of the Verkhovna Rada Elena Bondarenko and Vladimir Saldo, who in 2022 became the civilian leader of Russian-occupied Kherson Oblast.

The Insider told in October 2023 that Kurchenko is the mainly sponsor of FSB General Vladimir Petrovsky, who serves as the First Deputy Head of the FSB's Fifth Service Operational Information Department and leads Ninth ("Ukrainian") Directorate.

Kurchenko gained exclusive access to Ukrainian assets in the occupied territories with his ties with the FSB. He runs business in Russian-occupied territories of Ukraine, including Crimea where he deals with various commodities like oil products. From Donbas Kurchenko exports coal.

Kurchenko got married in Moscow in 2023. Among the wedding guests were for example Ksenia Sobchak.

=== Sanctions ===
He was sanctioned by the UK government in 2022 in relation to the Russo-Ukrainian War.

In January 2023 Japan imposed sanctions on Serhiy Kurchenko.

== See also ==
- List of fugitives from justice who disappeared
