= Jewish Confederation of Ukraine =

Organisation in Ukraine

The Jewish Confederation of Ukraine
- Headquarters: Ukraine, Kyiv
- Official language: English, Ukrainian
- President: Boris Lozhkin
- Website: jcu.org.ua

The Jewish Confederation of Ukraine (JCU) is an association of Ukrainian public organizations founded in 1999. The Confederation unites independent social, charitable and religious Jewish organizations in Ukraine.

== History ==
The Jewish Confederation of Ukraine is an association of national, regional, and local Ukrainian organizations that strengthen and support Jewish Ukrainian relations. It was formerly established in April 1999 at a meeting attended by representatives of 294 Jewish groups and organizations.

The JCU was set up by four umbrella organizations: the Union of Jewish Religious Organizations of Ukraine, the Society for Jewish Culture/Jewish Council of Ukraine, the Association of Jewish Organizations and Communities-VAAD of Ukraine, and the Kyiv City Jewish Community.

In September 2018 the JCU and the American Jewish Committee (AJC), signed an association agreement to formalize their collaborative relationship.

== Mission ==
The mission of the JCU is to unite the Jews of Ukraine, to help the Jewish communities in the country and to support the State of Israel. They also aim to preserve Jewish history, culture and the memory of the Holocaust, while increasing the awareness of the role that the Jewish community has played in the history of Ukraine. The JCU also works to combat anti-Semitism and encourage international support for Ukraine's independence.

== Key figures ==
- Boris Lozhkin - President of the JCU and Vice-President of the World Jewish Congress. Lozhkin became President of the JCU in May 2018.
- Inna Ioffe- Executive Director of the JCU
- Borys Fuksmann – Honorary President, and former head of the JCU

== Organizations ==
=== Members ===
- Ukrainian Association of Judaic Religious Organizations (Ukrainian: Об'єднання іудейських релігійних організацій України)
- Kyiv City Hebrew Community (Ukrainian: Київська міська єврейська громада)
- All-Ukrainian Hebrew Council (Ukrainian: Єврейська рада України jadvis.org.ua)
- Hebrew Rights protection Group (Ukrainian: Єврейська правозахисна група)
- Borys Lozhkin Charity Fund (Ukrainian: Благодійний фонд Бориса Ложкіна lozhkin.foundation)
- Charity Fund in honour of Larysa Rodnianska (Ukrainian: Благодійний фонд імені Лариси Роднянської)

=== Partners ===
- World Jewish Congress
- European Jewish Congress
- Euro-Asian Jewish Congress
- The American Jewish Joint Distribution Committee
- Conference of European Rabbis (CER)
- OSCE
- Ukrainian Jewish Committee
- The Jewish Foundation of Ukraine
- Ukraine–Israel Business Council
- Ukrainian Jewish Encounter
- The Jewish Agency for Israel
- Lauder Foundation

== The Righteous People of My City ==
The flagship project of the JCU, "The Righteous of My City", is part of the wider international initiative The Righteous among the Nations led by Jerusalem-based memorial organisation Yad Vashem. In this context, the term "Righteous" refers to people who risked their lives to save Jews during the Second World War. According to Yad Vashem, there are almost three thousand righteous people in Ukraine.

Announced in September 2018, JCU's project includes renaming streets in most of the major cities of Ukraine, granting special pensions to the Righteous People of Ukraine, filming documentaries, publishing books based on their stories and expanding the database of internationally recognized heroes

== Metropolitan Sheptytsky Medal ==
In 2013, the JCU established a tradition of awarding the Metropolitan Andrey Sheptytsky Medal to prominent figures who contributed to the development of Jewish-Ukrainian relations.

The medal was named after Andrey Sheptytsky, Ukrainian Greek Catholic Church Metropolitan Archbishop between 1901 and 1944 who openly criticised the Nazi regime and harboured and saved hundreds of Jews during the Second World War.

The first Sheptytsky Medal was awarded to James Temerty, founder of the Ukrainian Jewish Encounter. The second recipient of the award was Victur Pinchuk, founder of the Yalta European Strategy and Pinchuk Foundation.

In 2016 the medal was given to Ivan Dziuba during the commemorative events surrounding the 75th anniversary of the Babi Yar tragedy. Dziuba was recognized for his longstanding commitment to human rights and dialogue between nations. In 2018, the 4th medal was awarded to Ronald Lauder, President of the World Jewish Congress.
