= Oleksandr Korniyenko =

Ukrainian politician (born 1984)

- Олександр Корнієнко
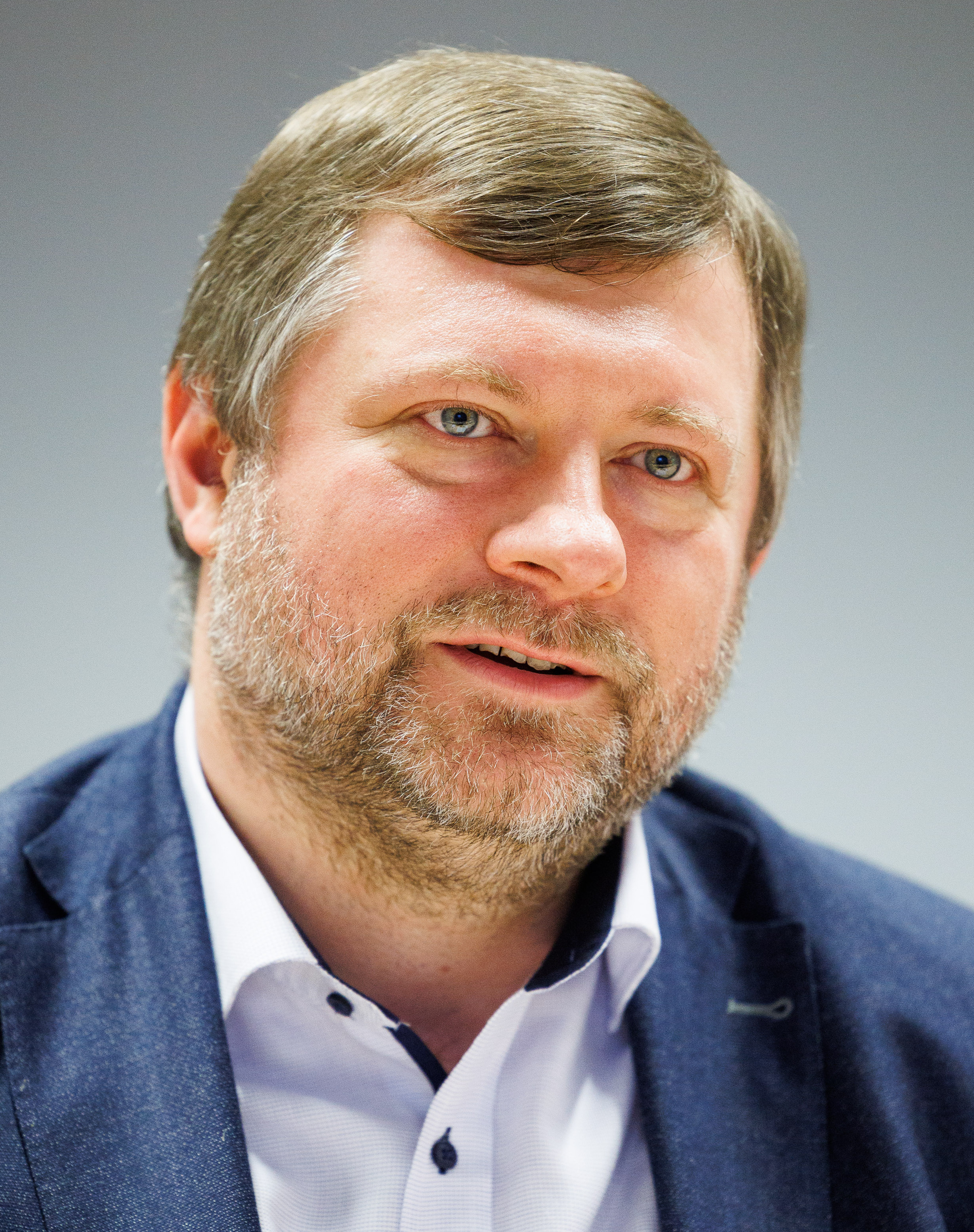
- Korniyenko in 2023

First Deputy Chairman of the Verkhovna Rada
- Incumbent
- Assumed office 19 October 2021
- Preceded by: Ruslan Stefanchuk

Leader of Servant of the People
- Incumbent
- Assumed office 17 December 2025
- Preceded by: Olena Shuliak
- In office 10 November 2019 – 15 November 2021
- Preceded by: Dmytro Razumkov
- Succeeded by: Olena Shuliak

People's Deputy of Ukraine
- Incumbent
- Assumed office 29 August 2019

Personal details
- Born: Oleksandr Serhiyovych Korniyenko; 12 May 1984 (age 42) Kiev, Ukrainian SSR, Soviet Union (now Kyiv, Ukraine)
- Party: Servant of the People
- Spouse: Olha Korniyenko (m. 2007)
- Children: 3
- Education: Kyiv Polytechnic Institute; Wiesbaden Academy for Psychotherapy
- Occupation: business coach development consultant

Oleksandr Serhiiovych Korniyenko (Note: Transliterated as Korniienko by the national standard) (Ukrainian: Олександр Сергійович Корнієнко; born 12 May 1984) is a Ukrainian politician, who has been serving as the First Deputy Chairman of the Verkhovna Rada of Ukraine since 19 October 2021, as well as the leader of the Servant of the People party since 17 December 2025., and from 2019 until 2021. Korniyenko was elected to the Verkhovna Rada in the 2019 parliamentary election, and has been serving as the people's deputy ever since.

== Early life and education ==
In 2001, Oleksaxndr Korniyenko entered the Kyiv Polytechnic Institute. Six years later, in 2007, he has graduated from the KPI with a master’s degree in Chemical Technology and Engineering. Next year, he was enrolled to the Ukrainian Center, the Wiesbaden Academy of Psychotherapy in Germany. After studying for 2 years, in 2010, Korniyenko graduated as a consulting psychologist.

In 2015, he continued to study at the School of Existential Coaching, and in 2018 graduated as a consulting coach in existential approach. 2 years later, in 2020, Korniyenko was enrolled to the Educational and Scientific Institute of Public Administration and Civil Service of Taras Shevchenko National University of Kyiv for a postgraduate course, completing it with the dissertation topic “Models of Territorial Organization of Public Authority: A Comparative Analysis”.

From 2001 to 2008, Korniyenko worked as a journalist and organising festivals. In 2008, he started to work as a private entrepreneur in the field of adult and business education, team building and business games. From 2019 to the present day, he has been working as a civil servant.

From 2004 until 2005, he had been holding a position of a spokesperson of the student strike committee during the Orange Revolution. From 2005 till 2010, he was a leader of the all-Ukrainian youth organization Union of Initiative Youth. He had also been an active participant in the Revolution of Dignity. Between 2016 and 2018, he took part in the GoCamp initiative by GoGlobal (language volunteers from all over the world to Ukraine).

== Political career ==
Since 2006, Korniyenko was engaging in political consulting during electoral campaigns. Later, he worked as a political consultant to such parties as the Democratic Alliance, Power of the People and Our Land. In 2018, Korniyenko joined the team of Volodymyr Zelenskyy, when he was not a candidate yet. In 2019, he became a head of the election headquarters of the newly formed Servant of the People political party as well as No. 7 on its list for the parliamentary election in July that year, where he was elected the people's deputy of Ukraine. Until October 2021, Korniyenko was the first deputy leader of the Servant of the People parliamentary faction, as well holding positions in the committees, such as the Head of the Subcommittee on the Organization of State Power of the Verkhovna Rada of Ukraine Committee on State Building, Local Governance, Regional and Urban Development.

In 2025, he was elected as head of Servant of the People.

=== International activity ===
He is active on the diplomatic stage. Between 2022–2023, he held over 150 international meetings and paid official visits to more than 20 countries.

- Co-chair of the NATO-Ukraine Interparliamentary Council (UNIC);
- Head of the Delegation of the Verkhovna Rada of Ukraine to the Inter-Parliamentary Union (IPU);
- Head of the Delegation of the Verkhovna Rada of Ukraine to the Interparliamentary Assembly of the Association of Southeast Asian Nations (ASEAN);
- Works to deepen inter-parliamentary cooperation in the Global South, in particular with the countries of Africa;
- Head of the Delegation of the Verkhovna Rada of Ukraine to the Council of Europe in the High-Level Multilateral Dialogue “Good Governance in Ukraine: Achievements, Challenges and the Way Forward in Post-War Period”;
- Co-chair of Parliament group Network of OECD;
- Member of the Ukrainian delegation for negotiations with the European Union regarding the Accession Agreement.

== See also ==
- List of members of the parliament of Ukraine, 2019–24
