= Borys Lozhkin =

Ukrainian businessman and Jewish community leader

- Борис Ложкін
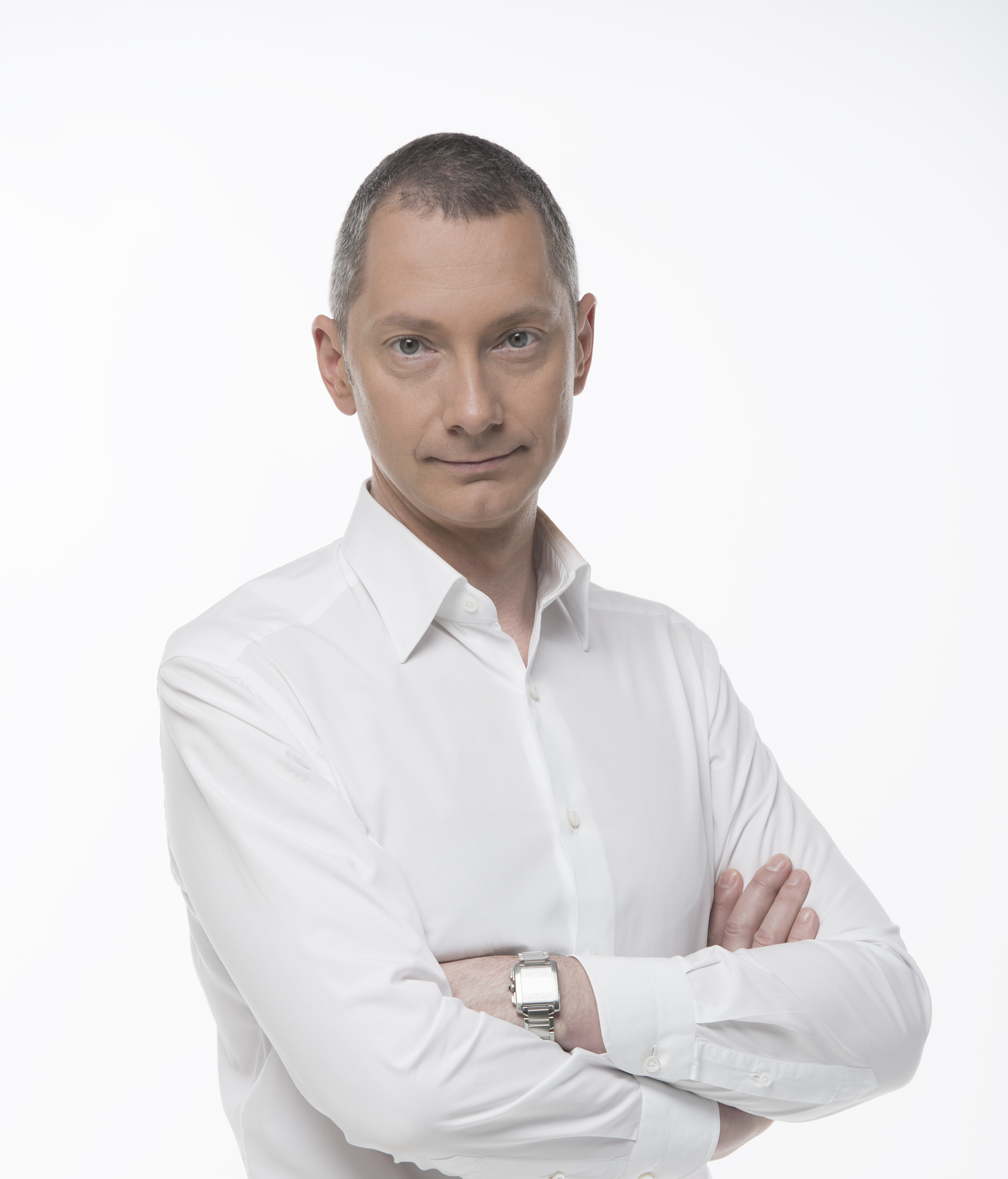
- Lozhkin in 2011

President of the Jewish Confederation of Ukraine
- Incumbent
- Assumed office May 2018

Head of the Presidential Administration of Ukraine
- In office June 2014 – August 2016
- President: Petro Poroshenko
- Preceded by: Serhiy Pashynskyi (acting); Andriy Klyuyev
- Succeeded by: Ihor Rainin

Member of the Kharkiv City Council
- In office 1998–2002
- Mayor: Mykhaylo Pylypchuk

Personal details
- Born: October 23, 1971 (age 54) Kharkiv, Ukrainian SSR, Soviet Union

Borys Yevhenovych Lozhkin (Ukrainian: Борис Євгенович Ложкін; born October 23, 1971) is a Ukrainian entrepreneur, philanthropist, and politician. He is the President of the Jewish Confederation of Ukraine, Vice-president of the World Jewish Congress, First Vice-president of the Euro-Asian Jewish Congress.

== Business career ==
In 1986, while still attending school, he began working as a journalist.

In 1989, he launched his entrepreneurial career by establishing a newspaper and magazine retail network in Kharkiv.

In 1994, he founded the newspaper Telenedelya, which became the foundation of the future Ukrainian Media Holding — subsequently one of the largest multimedia businesses in Eastern Europe.

In 2000, he established the international media holding UMH group on the basis of Ukrainian Media Holding.

In 2001, he launched the first radio station within UMH group.

In 2002, he concluded a contract with the French media group Lagardère for the launch of the radio station Europa Plus in Ukraine.

In 2008, UMH group became the first Ukrainian media company to conduct a private placement on the Frankfurt Stock Exchange, raising $45 million for a 15% stake and achieving a market capitalisation of $300 million.

In 2011, Borys Lozhkin signed a contract with the American company Forbes Media granting UMH group the right to publish Forbes Ukraine.

In 2012, he concluded a strategic partnership agreement with the American publishing house Condé Nast and acquired the rights to publish Vogue Ukraine.

By 2013, the media holding had been recognised as the largest publishing company in Ukraine and the 15th largest in the post-Soviet space. Its total print run reached approximately 115 million copies, with a workforce of 4,500 employees.

In 2013, UMH group was sold for approximately $400 million.

In 2016, Lozhkin resumed his entrepreneurial and investment activities, focusing on investments in fast-growing companies in Ukraine and abroad.

Also in 2016, he served on a pro bono basis as Secretary of the National Investment Council for attracting foreign investment to Ukraine.

== Public activities ==
- Member of the Kharkiv City Council (1998–2002).
- Member of the Business Council under the Cabinet of Ministers of Ukraine (2003).
- President of the Ukrainian Association of Periodical Press Publishers (2004–2006).
- Member of the Presidium of the Federation of Employers in the Media Sphere of Ukraine (2012).

== Head of the Presidential Administration ==
From June 2014 to August 2016, Lozhkin served as Head of the Presidential Administration of Ukraine.

During his tenure, he oversaw and coordinated the implementation of reforms in the areas of defence, law enforcement, European integration, deregulation, public procurement, anti-corruption, the judiciary, and the tax system.

During this period, the National Anti-Corruption Bureau of Ukraine (NABU) was established, the transition of the Armed Forces of Ukraine to NATO standards was initiated, the National Police was reformed, and judicial reform was launched.

== President of the Jewish Confederation of Ukraine ==
In May 2018, Borys Lozhkin was elected President of the Jewish Confederation of Ukraine. In September 2018, the confederation announced the launch of the “Righteous of My City” project, under which streets, squares and parks were renamed in honour of Righteous of the Nations who had lived in Ukraine. Ukraine is home to over 2,600 recognised Righteous Among the Nations.

Lozhkin also serves as Vice-President of the World Jewish Congress.

In 2019, on Lozhkin’s initiative, the Jewish Confederation of Ukraine founded the annual international “Kyiv Jewish Forum” to address issues facing Jewish communities.

In 2021, to mark the 80th anniversary of the Babyn Yar massacre, the JCU — on Lozhkin’s initiative — jointly with the Israeli Holocaust Remembrance Centre Yad Vashem published the book Righteous Among the Nations: Ukraine, documenting Ukrainians who rescued Jews during the Second World War.

In 2021, on Lozhkin’s initiative, the Jewish Library book series was launched, in which international bestsellers about Jews and Israel are published in Ukrainian for the first time.

== Philanthropic activities ==
The Borys Lozhkin Foundation was established in 2014.

As part of the Art for Life project, two charity auctions were held in 2015 and 2016 in support of the Kyiv Medical Centre for Paediatric Surgery and Cardiology. Dozens of prominent Ukrainian artists contributed their works to the project. The proceeds were used to purchase modern medical equipment for the Centre.

In 2016, the Foundation, together with the American charitable organisation Supplies Over Seas (SOS), donated medical equipment worth $152,000 to hospitals in Kharkiv.

In May 2016, the Foundation supported the GoGlobal charity project to create mobile foreign-language camps for children from conflict zones.

In 2017, with support from the Lozhkin Foundation, a Post-Intensive Care and Rehabilitation Unit for Premature Newborns was opened at the Institute of Paediatrics, Obstetrics and Gynaecology of the National Academy of Medical Sciences of Ukraine. Funds for the unit were raised at the Art for Life auction.

In October 2018, Borys Lozhkin and Nadiia Shalomova donated a Maquet HL 20 heart-lung machine to the Centre for Paediatric Cardiology and Cardiac Surgery, purchased with funds raised at the fourth Art for Life auction.

In November 2019, funds raised at the fifth Art for Life charity auction were used to purchase and install a high-precision ultrasound diagnostic device at the Centre for Paediatric Hepatology, and an intensive care unit was also equipped.

In total, approximately $2 million was provided to children’s clinics across Ukraine through the proceeds of the Art for Life auctions.

== Awards and achievements ==
- Candidate of Philological Sciences.
- Honored Journalist of Ukraine.
- “Person of the Year 2003” in the category “Entrepreneur of the Year”
- “Entrepreneur of the Year” and “Fast-Growing Business” awards at the international Ernst & Young Entrepreneur Of The Year competition in Ukraine (2008).

== Books ==
- Does Kharkiv Have a Future? Kharkiv, 1998. Co-authored with Ihor Dushyn.
- Elections: Technologies of Electoral Campaigns. Kharkiv, 1998. I. Dushyn, A. Sysun, B. Lozhkin.
- The Fourth Republic: Why Europe Needs Ukraine and Ukraine Needs Europe. Kharkiv, 2016. Co-authored with Volodymyr Fedoryn.

The Fourth Republic was published in four languages (Ukrainian, Russian, English, and German). In October 2016, it was presented at the Frankfurt Book Fair.

Political offices
Preceded by Serhiy Pashynskyi	Head of the Presidential Administration; June 10, 2014 – August 29, 2016	Succeeded by Ihor Rainin
