= Olena Shuliak =

Ukrainian politician and entrepreneur (born 1976)

- Олена Шуляк
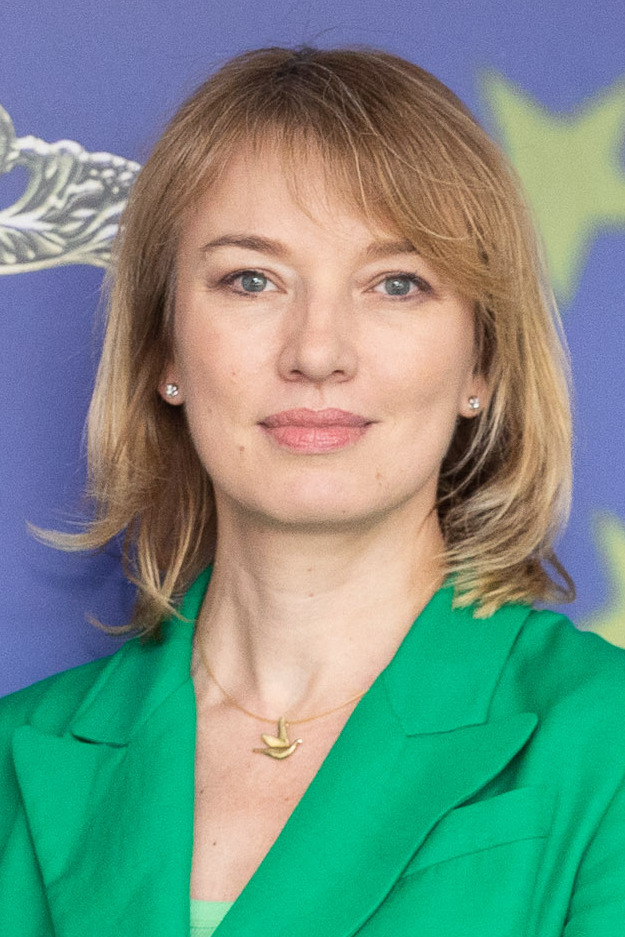
- Shuliak in 2023

Leader of Servant of the People
- In office 15 November 2021 – 17 December 2025
- Preceded by: Oleksandr Kornienko
- Succeeded by: Oleksandr Kornienko

People's Deputy of Ukraine
- Incumbent
- Assumed office 29 August 2019

Personal details
- Born: 24 January 1976 (age 50) Kiev, Ukrainian SSR, Soviet Union (now Kyiv, Ukraine)
- Party: Servant of the People (from 2019)
- Other political affiliations: Democratic Alliance (until 2019)
- Education: National Transport University; MIM Business School, International Management Institute; Taras Shevchenko National University of Kyiv
- Awards: See awards

Olena Oleksiivna Shuliak (Ukrainian: Олена Олексіївна Шуляк; born 24 January 1976) is a Ukrainian politician who has served as leader of Servant of the People from 2021 until 2025. Shuliak has also been a People's Deputy, after having elected to the Verkhovna Rada in 2019.

Shuliak is also the Chairwoman of a Committee in the Verkhovna Rada for the Organization of the State Power, Local Self-Government, Regional Development and Urban Planning, and the chairwoman of the Coordination Сouncil, which solves problematic issues in the field of urban planning under the President of Ukraine.

== Early life and career ==
Olena Oleksiivna Shuliak was born on 24 January 1976 in Kiev. She graduated from the National Transport University in 1997, majoring in economics and construction management.

She subsequently completed a Master of Business Administration degree at the International Institute of Management in 2005. She also graduated from Taras Shevchenko National University of Kyiv in 2012, majoring in psychology.

== Business career ==
Since 1999, Shuliak has been a certified auditor.

She worked as the department director for the audit and analysis of financial and economic activities of the financial-industrial group Midland Group in Ukraine between 2000 and 2006. She was a member of the Supervisory Board of CJSC Express Bank between 2005 and 2007 and held the position of General Director of Midland Development Ukraine between 2007 and 2014.

She headed the Supervisory Board of the Ukrainian Construction Community between 2014 and 2015. In October 2017, she became a co-founder of Creator LLC.

She is the head and owner of the Standard audit firm between 1999 and 2000 before returning in 2018.

She was Vice President for Finance of the Ukrainian branch of the international organization, Young Presidents' Organization.

She was a board member and head of the Construction Sector in the Better Regulation Delivery Office, and was a coordinator of the Talent Pool initiative.

== Political activity ==
In 2014, she was a candidate for deputy of the Kyiv City Council from the Democratic Alliance party, number 5 on the list.

In April 2015, she was a candidate for the post of head of the State Fiscal Service of Ukraine.

She is a member of the board of the social and political movement People are Important.

Shuliak ran successfully as a People's Deputy of Ukraine for President Volodymyr Zelenskyy's Servant of the People party in the 2019 Ukrainian parliamentary election, number 13 on the party list. Since 15 November 2019, she has served as the representative of the Government of Ukraine in the Verkhovna Rada.

She is the deputy Chairwoman of the parliamentary faction of Servant of the People. and the Chairwoman of the Committee of the Verkhovna Rada of Ukraine on the Organization of the State Power, Local Self-Government, Regional Development and Urban Planning.

Since 15 November 2021, she has headed Servant of the People. She was reelected for a second term on 14 December 2023.

== Legislative activities ==
Among Olena Shuliak's main bills, which were supported by the Verkhovna Rada in the second reading and in general, are:

- No. 1052 on improving the regulation of construction. The document introduces modern architectural solutions and new technologies in construction.
- No. 2698 on the provision of construction products on the market. As part of European Union–Ukraine Association Agreement, Ukraine has committed itself to harmonizing standards for construction products in accordance with Regulation No. 305 (document on the transition to a civilized market for construction products). This document allows harmonization of standards for construction products in Ukraine in line with the European ones.
- No. 5091 on guaranteeing real rights to real estate objects to be constructed in the future. The document introduces reliable safeguards against fraud in residential real estate.
- No. 5655 on urban planning reform. The reform aims to digitize the urban planning system, introduce strict control over construction projects, and introduce high liability for violations.

There are many comments against this bill, it is considered a bill that lobbies the interests of developers. Architects, urban planners, public organizations, city administrations (among them the mayors of Kyiv, Dnipro, and Lviv), as well as the Ministry of Culture and the National Agency on Corruption Prevention spoke against the adoption of the law.

- No. 7198 on the mechanism of compensation for destroyed and damaged housing as a result of the full-scale Russian invasion of Ukraine. The document is a tool for obtaining compensation, and also ensures the full restoration of the housing infrastructure of communities.

== Awards ==
- Ukraine
  - Order of Princess Olga (Third Class) — for a significant personal contribution to state building, strengthening of defense capabilities, socio-economic, scientific, technical, cultural and educational development of the Ukrainian state, many years of conscientious work, significant labor achievements, as well as in connection with 30th Anniversary of the Independence of Ukraine. (2021)
