= Office of the National Investment Council of Ukraine =

Office of the National Investment Council of Ukraine is a non-governmental organization that provides platform and facilitation for a dialogue between business, authorities and global investor community.

Based in Kyiv since early 2017, the Office is supported by the European Bank for Reconstruction and Development.

Functions:

- Facilitation of the dialogue between all stakeholders - business community, state authorities, regulators and international financial institutions - on improving investment climate in Ukraine
- Policy-making and advocacy of the legislation and regulatory acts that improve the investment climate in Ukraine
- Co-ordination and facilitation of dialogue between foreign investors and key stakeholders in Ukraine
- Organization of sectoral working groups to identify key issues related to the investment climate and investment flows, development of roadmaps.
- Providing analytical and legal coverage of key issues affecting the investment climate in Ukraine
- Organizational and communication support of the Council's activities - planning and organization of Council meetings, agenda development, monitoring of the implementation of Council decisions and recommendations, dealing with requests to the Council

== Head of the Office of the National Investment Council ==
Head of the Office is Olga Magaletska. Since January 2017 Olga Magaletska is a co-founder of the National Investment Council under the protection of the President of Ukraine, and in December 2019 Olga became the Head of the Office. In 2018-2019 Olga worked for Ukrnafta (part of state owned Naftogaz) as a Head of Government Relations (GR). The strategic role was to develop cooperation with high-level stakeholders and key politicians and to improve regulations for Oil&Gas sector. During 2015-2017 she worked as an advisor at the Ministry of Economic Development and Trade and the Project Office of the National Reform Council as a Project Manager for investment promotion, responsible for investment strategy creation for Ukraine and for establishing a new Investment Promotion institution. Olga also is a co-author of the Law for limited liability companies. In earlier years, 2009-2016, Olga Magaletska worked as Associate Vice President for Citibank and Raiffeisen Bank supervising various functions. Olga is also highly interested in technology and innovations. Since 2013 she did several VC investments and became a co-founder of two startups in the education and IT education sphere. Olga’s personal interests are long-distance running (marathons) and painting.

== Publications ==
- Op-eds by Head of the Office Yuliya Kovaliv in the Kyivpost
