= 1994 Ukrainian parliamentary election =

- 27 March 1994 (first round) 2–10 April 1994 (second round)

All 450 seats in the Verkhovna Rada 226 seats needed for a majority
- Turnout: 75.81% (▼8.88 pp)
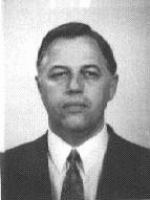

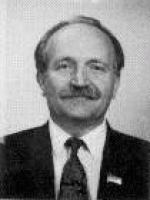

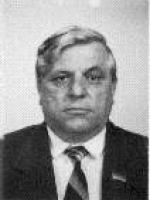

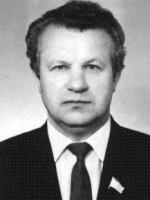

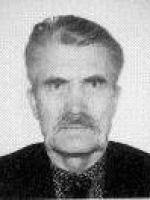

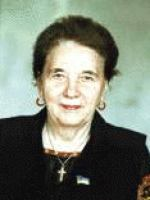

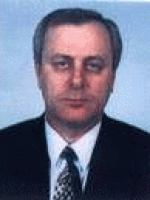

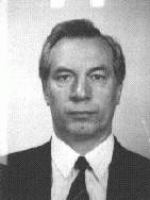

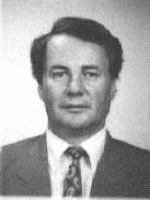
	First party	Second party	Third party
Leader	Petro Symonenko	Viacheslav Chornovil	Serhii Dovhan
Party	KPU	Rukh	SelPU
Leader since	19 June 1993	4 December 1992	25 January 1992
Leader's seat	Krasnoarmiisk	Podilskyi	Velyka Oleksandrivka
Seats won	86	20	19
Popular vote	3,683,332	1,491,164	794,614
Percentage	13.57%	5.49%	2.93%
	Fourth party	Fifth party	Sixth party
Leader	Oleksandr Moroz	Levko Lukianenko	Slava Stetsko
Party	SPU	URP	KUN
Leader since	26 October 1991	29 April 1990	18 October 1992
Leader's seat	Tarashcha	Novovolynsk	Nadvirna
Seats won	14	8	5
Popular vote	895,830	728,614	361,352
Percentage	3.30%	2.68%	1.33%
	Seventh party	Eighth party	Ninth party
Leader	Volodymyr Filenko	Mykola Azarov	Volodymyr Yavorivsky
Party	PDVU	PP	DPU
Leader since	1 December 1990	September 1993	12 December 1992
Leader's seat	Zhovtnevyi (lost)	Petrovskyi	Svitlovodsk
Seats won	4	4	2
Popular vote	239,763	114,409	312,842
Percentage	0.88%	0.42%	1.15%
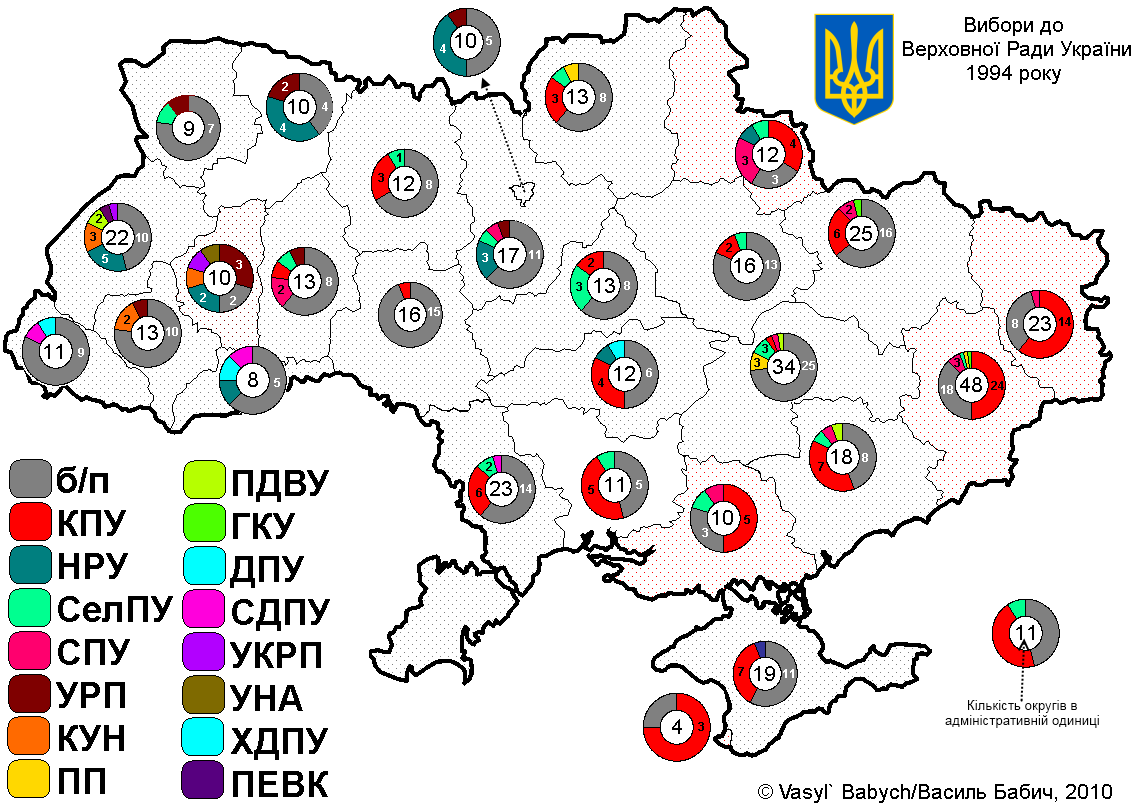
- Results by region
Chairman of the Verkhovna Rada before election
Ivan Plyushch
Independent
Elected Chairman of the Verkhovna Rada
Oleksandr Moroz
SPU

Parliamentary elections were held in Ukraine on 27 March 1994, with a second round between 2 and 10 April. These were the first parliamentary elections in Ukraine as an independent state. A total of 15 political parties won seats, although a majority of deputies were independents. However, 112 seats remained unfilled, and a succession of by-elections were required in July, August, November and December 1994 and more in December 1995 and April 1996. Three hundred (300) seats or two thirds (2/3) of the parliament were required to be filled for the next convocation.

In what were the first elections held after Ukraine broke away from the Soviet Union, the Communist Party of Ukraine emerged as the largest party in the Verkhovna Rada, winning 86 of the 338 seats decided in the first two rounds. This election was the result of a compromise between the President and the Verkhovna Rada, which was reached on 24 September 1993 because of a political crisis caused by mass protests and strikes particularly from students and miners. On that day, the Rada adopted a decree to organize parliamentary elections ahead of schedule, and ahead of scheduled presidential elections in June.

== Electoral system (50% rule) ==
As in the previous this election took place according to the majoritarian electoral system in 450 electoral districts containing several precincts. Each region was assigned a proportion of districts depending on its population. Hence the most mandates were received by the more populated eastern regions of Ukraine, particularly the regions of Donets basin such as Donetsk Oblast and Dnipropetrovsk Oblast.

In order to be elected a candidate needed to obtain more than 50% of votes and in order for the election to be valid more than 50% of registered voters needed to vote. If no candidate obtained more than 50% in the first round, the top two candidates were listed on the ballot in the second round. In the second round the 50% rule was applied as well. Reelections were called if the 50% votes in the second round was not met.

Because of those conditions several districts in the Verkhovna Rada were left not represented for a whole convocation. Particularly acute that problem was in the city of Kyiv that was assigned 23 mandates, while in the parliament only 10 representatives for Kyiv participated in the second convocation - less than a half. Kyiv became the most under represented region.

== Results ==
Party	Votes	%	Seats
Communist Party of Ukraine	3,683,332	13.57	86
People's Movement of Ukraine	1,491,164	5.49	20
Socialist Party of Ukraine	895,830	3.30	14
Peasant Party of Ukraine	794,614	2.93	19
Ukrainian Republican Party	728,614	2.68	8
Congress of Ukrainian Nationalists	361,352	1.33	5
Democratic Party of Ukraine	312,842	1.15	2
Party of Democratic Revival of Ukraine	239,763	0.88	4
Liberal Party of Ukraine	173,503	0.64	0
Ukrainian National Assembly	148,239	0.55	1
Party of Labor	114,409	0.42	4
Social Democratic Party of Ukraine	104,204	0.38	2
Christian Democratic Party of Ukraine	100,007	0.37	1
Ukrainian Conservative Republican Party	99,028	0.36	2
Toiling Congress of Ukraine	83,702	0.31	0
Civil Congress of Ukraine	72,473	0.27	2
Party of Greens of Ukraine	71,946	0.27	0
Social-National Party of Ukraine	49,483	0.18	0
Ukrainian Party of Justice	40,414	0.15	0
State Independence of Ukraine	24,722	0.09	0
Party of Economic Revival	20,829	0.08	0
Party of Slavic Unity of Ukraine	18,807	0.07	0
Organization of Ukrainian Nationalists	16,766	0.06	0
Ukrainian Party of Solidarity and Social Justice	12,847	0.05	0
Constitutional Democratic Party of Ukraine	12,711	0.05	0
Ukrainian Peasant Democratic Party	11,827	0.04	0
Liberal Democratic Party of Ukraine	8,576	0.03	0
Ukrainian National Conservative Party	6,668	0.02	0
Ukrainian Christian Democratic Party	5,917	0.02	0
Ukrainian Beer Lovers Party	1,806	0.01	0
Party of Free Peasants of Ukraine	1,169	0.00	0
Party of National Salvation of Ukraine	515	0.00	0
Other parties	28,166	0.10	0
Independents	14,894,269	54.87	168
Against all	2,512,118	9.26	–
Vacant			112
Total	27,142,632	100.00	450
Valid votes	27,142,632	93.71	
Invalid/blank votes	1,821,350	6.29	
Total votes	28,963,982	100.00	
Registered voters/turnout	38,204,100	75.81	
Source: Nohlen & Stöver

=== Parliamentary factions ===
Blocs were formed in the Rada on 11 May 1994:

Political Bloc	Seats	Supported for the President
Communists of Ukraine	83	Oleksandr Moroz, Leonid Kuchma
Socialist Party of Ukraine	25	Oleksandr Moroz
People's Movement of Ukraine (Rukh)	27	Volodymyr Lanovyi, Leonid Kravchuk
Interregional Bloc	26	Leonid Kuchma
Bloc "Derzhavnist'"	25	Leonid Kravchuk
Bloc "Center"	38	Leonid Kravchuk
Bloc "Agrarians of Ukraine"	36	Oleksandr Tkachenko, Leonid Kravchuk
Bloc "Reforms"	27	Volodymyr Lanovyi
Bloc "Unity"	25	–
Not affiliated	23	–
Total	355	

The political blocs formed in the Verkhovna Rada did not exactly represent a similar party. Such parties as the Peasant's Party of Ukraine (SelPU) and the Agrarians for Reform (AZR) (a breakaway group of former SelPU members) formed the Agrarians of Ukraine bloc. Although some of the deputies, especially from SelPU, joined the Socialist bloc. The Ukrainian Republican Party (URP), the Congress of Ukrainian Nationalists (CUN), and the Democratic Party of Ukraine (DemPU) has formed the electoral bloc Derzhavnist (Statehood).

- The left electoral blocs: Communists of Ukraine, Socialist bloc, and Peasant's Party of Ukraine
- The right electoral blocs: People's Movement of Ukraine and Derzhavnist
- The center electoral blocs: Interregional bloc, Social-Market Choice, Unity, and Agrarians for Reforms
- The centre-right electoral blocs: Reforms and Center

In February 1997 the following factions were present in parliament:

- The leftist: Communist of Ukraine (86 seats), Socialist Party of Ukraine (25 seats) and Peasant's Party of Ukraine (38 seats)
- The centrist: Constitutional Center (56 seats), Unity (37 seats), Intraregional Deputies Group (28 seats), Social-Market Choice (25 seats) and Independents (25 seats)
- The national democratic: Reforms and (29 seats) People's Movement of Ukraine (27 seats).

=== Elected members by constituency ===
#	Region	Mandates	Position	District	Name	Votes %	Party	Ethnicity
1	Kyiv	23	Central	001				
1	Kyiv	23	Central	002				
1	Kyiv	23	Central	003				
1	Kyiv-Holosiivsky	23	Central	004	Yaroslav Fedoryn		People's Movement of Ukraine	Ukrainian
1	Kyiv-Darnytsky	23	Central	005	Leonid Chernovyetskiy			Russian
1	Kyiv	23	Central	006				
1	Kyiv	23	Central	007				
1	Kyiv-Leninhradsky	23	Central	008	Volodymyr Bondarenko			Ukrainian
1	Kyiv	23	Central	009				
1	Kyiv	23	Central	010				
1	Kyiv-Pechersky	23	Central	011	Anatoliy Kovalenko			Ukrainian
1	Kyiv	23	Central	012				
1	Kyiv-Podilsky	23	Central	013	Mykola Slavov			Bulgarian
1	Kyiv	23	Central	014				
1	Kyiv-Promyslovy	23	Central	015	Yuriy Orobets		Ukrainian Republican Party	Ukrainian
1	Kyiv-Radyansky	23	Central	016	Myroslav Horbatyuk		People's Movement of Ukraine	Ukrainian
1	Kyiv-Rusanivsky	23	Central	017	Volodymyr Lanovy			Ukrainian
1	Kyiv-Svyatoshynsky	23	Central	018	Ivan Zayets		People's Movement of Ukraine	Ukrainian
1	Kyiv-Syrets	23	Central	019	Heorhiy Holovaty			Ukrainian
1	Kyiv	23	Central	020				
1	Kyiv	23	Central	021				
1	Kyiv	23	Central	022				
1	Kyiv-Chervonoarmiysky	23	Central	023	Yuriy Kostenko		People's Movement of Ukraine	Ukrainian
2	AR Crimea-Zaliznychny	19	South	024	Albert Zhumkin		Communist Party of Ukraine	Russian
2	AR Crimea-Kyivsky	19	South	025	Lev Mirimskiy			Jewish
2	AR Crimea-Rostovsky	19	South	026	Yuriy Miroshnichenko		Communist Party of Ukraine	Russian
2	AR Crimea-Tsentralny	19	South	027	Eduard Pavlyenko		Communist Party of Ukraine	Russian
2	AR Crimea-Alushta	19	South	028	Nina Karpachova			Russian
2	AR Crimea-Dzhankoi	19	South	029	Mykola Pylypenko			Ukrainian
2	AR Crimea-Yevpatoria	19	South	030	Anatoliy Rakhansky			Ukrainian
2	AR Crimea-Kerch	19	South	031	Anatoliy Franchuk			
2	AR Crimea-Krasnoperekopsk	19	South	032	Halyna Starovoitova			Ukrainian
2	AR Crimea-Saky	19	South	033	Anatoliy Drobotov		Communist Party of Ukraine	Russian
2	AR Crimea-Feodosia	19	South	034	Mykhailo Doroshevskiy		Communist Party of Ukraine	Russian
2	AR Crimea-Yalta	19	South	035	Ihor Franchuk			Russian
2	AR Crimea-Bakhchysarai	19	South	036	Yuriy Kohen			Karaite
2	AR Crimea-Bilohirsk	19	South	037	Valeriy Horbatov			Ukrainian
2	AR Crimea-Kirovske	19	South	038	Olena Krandakova			Ukrainian
2	AR Crimea-Krasnohvardiyske	19	South	039	Volodymyr Yehudin		Party of Economical Revival	Jewish
2	AR Crimea-Lenine	19	South	040	Olha Pshenichnaya			Russian
2	AR Crimea-Rozdolne	19	South	041	Ihor Sharov		Communist Party of Ukraine	Ukrainian
2	AR Crimea-Simferopol	19	South	042	Nataliya Shtepa		Communist Party of Ukraine	Russian
3	Sevastopol-Balaklava	4	South	043	Oleksandr Bobrynyov		Communist Party of Ukraine	not identified
3	Sevastopol-Gagarinsky	4	South	044	Yuriy Sheryenin			Russian
3	Sevastopol-Leninsky	4	South	045	Anatoliy Yurkovsky		Communist Party of Ukraine	Ukrainian
3	Sevastopol-Nakhimovsky	4	South	046	Vadym Zachosov		Communist Party of Ukraine	Russian
4	Vinnytsia-Zamostyansky	17	Central	047	Nina Markovska			Ukrainian
4	Vinnytsia	17	Central	048				
4	Vinnytsia-Staromisky	17	Central	049	Ihor Kvyatkovsky			Polish
4	Vinnytsia-Zhmerynka	17	Central	050	Anatoliy Yukhymchuk			Ukrainian
4	Vinnytsia-Mohyliv-Podilsky	17	Central	051	Mykhailo Parasunko			Ukrainian
4	Vinnytsia-Khmilnyk	17	Central	052	Volodymyr Bryauzov			Russian
4	Vinnytsia-Bar	17	Central	053	Volodymyr Yarovenko			Ukrainian
4	Vinnytsia-Bershad	17	Central	054	Vasyl Kavun			Ukrainian
4	Vinnytsia-Vinnytsia	17	Central	055	Anatoliy Kondratyuk			Ukrainian
4	Vinnytsia-Haisyn	17	Central	056	Vasyl Lantukh		Communist Party of Ukraine	Ukrainian
4	Vinnytsia-Kozyatyn	17	Central	057	Hryhoriy Nedvyha			Ukrainian
4	Vinnytsia-Nemyriv	17	Central	058	Volodymyr Stretovych			Ukrainian
4	Vinnytsia-Pohrebyshche	17	Central	059	Volodymyr Butkevych			Ukrainian
4	Vinnytsia-Trostyanets	17	Central	060	Ivan Yamkovy			Ukrainian
4	Vinnytsia-Tulchyn	17	Central	061	Yevhen Smirnov			Ukrainian
4	Vinnytsia-Sharhorod	17	Central	062	Oleksandr Stoyan			Ukrainian
4	Vinnytsia-Yampil	17	Central	063	Kostyantyn Piskunovsky			Ukrainian
5	Volyn-Lutsk	9	West	064	Mykola Zhulynsky			Ukrainian
5	Volyn	9	West	065				
5	Volyn-Volodymyr-Volynskyi	9	West	066	Oleksandr Skipalsky			Ukrainian
5	Volyn-Kovel	9	West	067	Andriy Mostysky			Ukrainian
5	Volyn-Novovolynsk	9	West	068	Levko Lukyanenko		Ukrainian Republican Party	Ukrainian
5	Volyn-Horokhiv	9	West	069	Kateryna Vashchuk			Ukrainian
5	Volyn-Kamin Kashyrsky	9	West	070	Anton Buteiko			Ukrainian
5	Volyn-Kivertsi	9	West	071	Rostyslav Chapyuk		Peasant Party of Ukraine	Ukrainian
5	Volyn-Stara Vyzhivka	9	West	072	Vasyl Kornelyuk; Petro Hermanchuk			Ukrainian; Ukrainian
6	Dnipropetrovsk-Amur-Nyzhnyodniprovsky	34	East	073	Petro Ovcharenko			Ukrainian
6	Dnipropetrovsk-Babushkinsky	34	East	074	Vyacheslav Tyutin		Party of Labor	not identified
6	Dnipropetrovsk-Vuzivsky	34	East	075	Oleksandr Ryabchenko			not identified
6	Dnipropetrovsk-Zhovtnevy	34	East	076	Serhiy Mykhailenko		Party of Democratic Revival	Ukrainian
6	Dnipropetrovsk-Industrialny	34	East	077	Leonid Kostyuchenko			Ukrainian
6	Dnipropetrovsk-Kirovsky	34	East	078	Viktor Myerkushov			Russian
6	Dnipropetrovsk-Krasnohvardiysky	34	East	079	Vadym Litvin			Russian
6	Dnipropetrovsk-Leninsky	34	East	080	Viktor Savchenko (boxer)			Ukrainian
6	Dnipropetrovsk-Petrovsky	34	East	081	Serhiy Chukmasov			Ukrainian
6	Dnipropetrovsk-Samarsky	34	East	082	Vitaliy Shybko		Socialist Party of Ukraine	Ukrainian
6	Dnipropetrovsk-Bahliysky	34	East	083	Mykola Bairak			Ukrainian
6	Dnipropetrovsk-Dniprovsky	34	East	084	Leonid Hamanyuk			Ukrainian
6	Dnipropetrovsk-Zavodsky	34	East	085	Anton Koropenko		Communist Party of Ukraine	Ukrainian
6	Dnipropetrovsk-Hirnytsky	34	East	086	Serhiy Syelifontiev			Russian
6	Dnipropetrovsk-Dzerzhynsky	34	East	087	Dmytro Stepanyuk			Ukrainian
6	Dnipropetrovsk-Dovhyntsivsky	34	East	088	Viktor Kocherha		Party of Labor	Ukrainian
6	Dnipropetrovsk-Inhulets	34	East	089	Volodymyr Melnyk			Ukrainian
6	Dnipropetrovsk-Kryvbasivsky	34	East	090	Vadym Hurov		Party of Labor	Ukrainian
6	Dnipropetrovsk-Ternivsky	34	East	091	Leonid Borodich			Ukrainian
6	Dnipropetrovsk-Tsentralno-Minsky	34	East	092	Viktor Hladush			Ukrainian
6	Dnipropetrovsk-Marhanets	34	East	093	Oleksandr Zhyr			Ukrainian
6	Dnipropetrovsk-Nikopol	34	East	094	Kostyantyn Lyashchenko			Ukrainian
6	Dnipropetrovsk-Novomoskovsk/Misky	34	East	095	Viktor Khudomaka			Ukrainian
6	Dnipropetrovsk-Pavlohrad	34	East	096	Ivan Kyrylenko			Ukrainian
6	Dnipropetrovsk-Zakhidno-Donbasky	34	East	097	Valeriy Babych			Russian
6	Dnipropetrovsk-Apostolove	34	East	098	Ivan Mahda			Ukrainian
6	Dnipropetrovsk-Vasylkivka	34	East	099	Yevhen Chulakov		Peasant Party of Ukraine	Ukrainian
6	Dnipropetrovsk-Verkhnyodniprovsk	34	East	100	Viktor Omelich			Ukrainian
6	Dnipropetrovsk-Nikopol/Silsky	34	East	101	Yuriy Tykhonov			Ukrainian
6	Dnipropetrovsk-Novomoskovsk/Silsky	34	East	102	Volodymyr Sadko		Peasant Party of Ukraine	Ukrainian
6	Dnipropetrovsk-Petropavlivka	34	East	103	Viktor Kharlamov		Peasant Party of Ukraine	Ukrainian
6	Dnipropetrovsk-Pyatykhatky	34	East	104	Anatoliy Moskalenko			Ukrainian
6	Dnipropetrovsk-Solone	34	East	105	Pavlo Lazarenko			Ukrainian
6	Dnipropetrovsk-Tsarychansky	34	East	106	Vitaliy Harkavy			Ukrainian
7	Donetsk-Budyonnivsky	47	East	107	Volodymyr Shcherban			Russian
7	Donetsk-Voroshylovsky	47	East	108	Serhiy Kiyashko		Socialist Party of Ukraine	Ukrainian
7	Donetsk-Kalininsky	47	East	109	Hannadiy Vasyliev			Ukrainian
7	Donetsk-Kyivsky	47	East	110	Yukhym Zvyahilsky			Jewish
7	Donetsk-Kirovsky	47	East	111	Anatoliy Pysarenko		Communist Party of Ukraine	Ukrainian
7	Donetsk-Kirovsk/Shakhtarsk	47	East	112	Yuriy Boldyryev		Civil Congress of Ukraine	Russian
7	Donetsk-Kuibyshevsky	47	East	113	Borys Kozhevnikov		Communist Party of Ukraine	Russian
7	Donetsk-Leninsky	47	East	114	Valentyn Landyk			Ukrainian
7	Donetsk-Petrovsky	47	East	115	Mykola Azarov		Party of Labor	Russian
7	Donetsk-Proletarsky	47	East	116	Volodymyr Ampilogov			Russian
7	Donetsk-Artemivsk/Misky	47	East	117	Volodymyr Cherepkov		Socialist Party of Ukraine	Ukrainian
7	Donetsk-Horlivka/Kalininsky	47	East	118	Yevhen Krasnyakov		Communist Party of Ukraine	Russian
7	Donetsk-Horlivka/Mykytivsky	47	East	119	Valeriy Sikalov		Communist Party of Ukraine	Russian
7	Donetsk-Horlivka/Tsentralny	47	East	120	Heorhiy Vyshnyevyetskiy		Communist Party of Ukraine	Russian
7	Donetsk-Dzerzhynsk	47	East	121	Hennadiy Samofalov			Russian
7	Donetsk-Dobropillya	47	East	122	Viktor Kocherha		Communist Party of Ukraine	Ukrainian
7	Donetsk-Druzhkivka	47	East	123	Kostyantyn Okhrimenko		Communist Party of Ukraine	Ukrainian
7	Donetsk-Yanakiyeve	47	East	124	Oleksandr Yakovyenko		Communist Party of Ukraine	Russian
7	Donetsk-Yunokomunarivsk	47	East	125	Mykhailo Chechetov			Russian
7	Donetsk-Kostiantynivka	47	East	126	Lyudmyla Pasechna		Communist Party of Ukraine	Ukrainian
7	Donetsk-Kramatorsk	47	East	127	Pavlo Kuznyetsov		Communist Party of Ukraine	Russian
7	Donetsk-Novokramatorsk	47	East	128	Oleksiy Shekhovtsov			Russian
7	Donetsk-Krasnoarmiysk	47	East	129	Mykola Zavarzin		Communist Party of Ukraine	Ukrainian
7	Donetsk-Krasnyi Lyman	47	East	130	Anatoliy Khunov		Communist Party of Ukraine	Adyghe
7	Donetsk-Makiivka/Hirnytsky	47	East	131	Volodymyr Moisyeyenko		Communist Party of Ukraine	Russian
7	Donetsk-Makiivka/Sovyetsky	47	East	132	Anatoliy Tatarynov			Ukrainian
7	Donetsk-Makiivka/Tsentralny	47	East	133	Victor Shevchenko			Ukrainian
7	Donetsk-Makiivka/Chervonohvardiysky	47	East	134	Valeriy Pudryk		Communist Party of Ukraine	Ukrainian
7	Donetsk-Mariupol/Zhovtnevy	47	East	135	Myakhilo Pozhyvanov			Ukrainian
7	Donetsk-Mariupol/Illichivsky	47	East	136	Lyudvih Miroshnychenko			Ukrainian
7	Donetsk-Mariupol/Ordzhenikidzevsky	47	East	137	Viktor Shestakov		Communist Party of Ukraine	Russian
7	Donetsk-Mariupol/Prymorsky	47	East	138	Vasyl Tereshchuk		Communist Party of Ukraine	Ukrainian
7	Donetsk-Selydove	47	East	139	Stanislav Yanko			Ukrainian
7	Donetsk-Slavyansk/Misky	47	East	140	Anatoliy Khmelyovy		Communist Party of Ukraine	Ukrainian
7	Donetsk-Snizhne	47	East	141	Leonid Kaminsky		Socialist Party of Ukraine	Ukrainian
7	Donetsk-Torez	47	East	142	Mykola Surhai			Ukrainian
7	Donetsk-Khartsyzk	47	East	143	Anatoliy Pyeigalainyen		Communist Party of Ukraine	Russian
7	Donetsk-Shakhtarsk	47	East	144	Oleksandr Shamarin		Communist Party of Ukraine	Russian
7	Donetsk-Yasynuvata	47	East	145	Oleksandr Kozhushko			Ukrainian
7	Donetsk-Amvrosiivka	47	East	146	Anatoliy Motspan			Ukrainian
7	Donetsk-Artemivsk	47	East	147	Oleh Panasovskiy		Communist Party of Ukraine	Russian
7	Donetsk-Volnovakha	47	East	148	Yevhen Shcherban; Valeriy Ivanov		Communist Party of Ukraine	Ukrainian; Russian
7	Donetsk-Volodar	47	East	149	Mykola Dondyk		Communist Party of Ukraine	Ukrainian
7	Donetsk-Krasnoarmiysk	47	East	150	Petro Symonenko		Communist Party of Ukraine	Ukrainian
7	Donetsk-Marinka	47	East	151	Volodymyr Oleksyeyenko			Ukrainian
7	Donetsk-Novoazovsk	47	East	152	Valentyn Nedryhailo			Ukrainian
7	Donetsk-Sloviansk	47	East	153	Anatoliy Petrenko		Peasant Party of Ukraine	Ukrainian
8	Zhytomyr-Bohunsky	13	Central	154	Heorhiy Mozer		Communist Party of Ukraine	German
8	Zhytomyr	13	Central	155				
8	Zhytomyr-Berdychiv	13	Central	156	Adam Chikal			Ukrainian
8	Zhytomyr-Korosten	13	Central	157	Volodymyr Yatsenko		Communist Party of Ukraine	Russian
8	Zhytomyr-Novohrad-Volynskyi	13	Central	158	Mykola Horbatyuk			Ukrainian
8	Zhytomyr-Andrushivka	13	Central	159	Valentyna Semenyuk		Communist Party of Ukraine	Ukrainian
8	Zhytomyr-Baranivka	13	Central	160	Serhiy Mosiychuk		Peasant Party of Ukraine	Ukrainian
8	Zhytomyr-Silsky	13	Central	161	Serhiy Melnyk			Ukrainian
8	Zhytomyr-Korostyshiv	13	Central	162	Hryhoriy Sydorenko			Ukrainian
8	Zhytomyr-Malyn	13	Central	163	Mykola Rudchenko			Ukrainian
8	Zhytomyr-Ovruch	13	Central	164	Viktor Kalnyk			Ukrainian
8	Zhytomyr-Olevsk	13	Central	165	Yuriy Spizhenko			Ukrainian
8	Zhytomyr-Chudniv	13	Central	166	Ivan Kostruba			Ukrainian
9	Zakarpattia-Misky	10	West	167	Serhiy Slobodyanyuk			Russian
9	Zakarpattia-Mukacheve	10	West	168	Vasyl Ulynets			Ukrainian
9	Zakarpattia-Berehove	10	West	169	Mykhailo Tovt			Hungarian
9	Zakarpattia-Vynohradiv	10	West	170	Serhiy Cheipesh		Christian Democratic Party of Ukraine	Ukrainian
9	Zakarpattia-Irshava	10	West	171	Serhiy Ustych; Viktor Medvedchuk		Social Democratic Party of Ukraine (united)	Ukrainian; Ukrainian
9	Zakarpattia-Rakhiv	10	West	172	Orest Klympush			Ukrainian
9	Zakarpattia-Svaliava	10	West	173	Mykhailo Ryabets			Ukrainian
9	Zakarpattia-Tiachiv	10	West	174	Ivan Korshynsky			Ukrainian
9	Zakarpattia-Silsky	10	West	175	Mykhailo Dancha			Ukrainian
9	Zakarpattia-Khust	10	West	176	Mykola Hrabar			Ukrainian
10	Zaporizhzhia-Zhovtnevy	18	South	177	Yuriy Syzenko		Communist Party of Ukraine	Ukrainian
10	Zaporizhzhia-Zavodsky	18	South	178	Leonid Anisimov			Russian
10	Zaporizhzhia-Komunarsky	18	South	179	Serhiy Kuzmenko		Communist Party of Ukraine	Ukrainian
10	Zaporizhzhia-Levanevsky	18	South	180	Mykola Taran		Communist Party of Ukraine	Ukrainian
10	Zaporizhzhia-Leninsky	18	South	181	Oleksandra Kuzhel			Russian
10	Zaporizhzhia-Ordzhenikidzivsky	18	South	182	Viktor Ponedilko		Communist Party of Ukraine	Ukrainian
10	Zaporizhzhia-Khortytsky	18	South	183	Serhiy Sobolyev		Party of Democratic Revival	Ukrainian
10	Zaporizhzhia-Shevchenkovsky	18	South	184	Fedir Sudnitsin			Russian
10	Zaporizhzhia-Berdiansk/Misky	18	South	185	Yevhen Todorov		Communist Party of Ukraine	Russian
10	Zaporizhzhia-Melitopol/Misky	18	South	186	Hennadiy Ugarov			Russian
10	Zaporizhzhia-Tokmak	18	South	187	Valeriy Terets			Ukrainian
10	Zaporizhzhia-Berdiansk	18	South	188	Anatoliy Holubchenko			Ukrainian
10	Zaporizhzhia-Vasylivka	18	South	189	Vyacheslav Byelsky		Communist Party of Ukraine	Ukrainian
10	Zaporizhzhia-Zaporizhzhia	18	South	190	Borys Oliynyk		Communist Party of Ukraine	Ukrainian
10	Zaporizhzhia-Kamianyanka-Dniprovska	18	South	191	Hryhoriy Lunyov		Peasant Party of Ukraine	Russian
10	Zaporizhzhia-Melitopol	18	South	192	Stepan Tkachenko			Ukrainian
10	Zaporizhzhia-Polohy	18	South	193	Anatoliy Yermak			Ukrainian
10	Zaporizhzhia-Pryazovsky	18	South	194	Viktor Bryt		Socialist Party of Ukraine	Ukrainian
11	Ivano-Frankivsk-Zaliznychny	13	West	195	Vasyl Kostytsky			Ukrainian
11	Ivano-Frankivsk-Tsentralny	13	West	196	Volodymyr Pylypchuk			Ukrainian
11	Ivano-Frankivsk-Kalush	13	West	197	Volodymyr Mulyava			Ukrainian
11	Ivano-Frankivsk-Kolomyia	13	West	198	Pavlo Movchan			Ukrainian
11	Ivano-Frankivsk-Dolyna	13	West	199	Stepan Volkovetsky			Ukrainian
11	Ivano-Frankivsk-Kosiv	13	West	200	Roman Shpek			Ukrainian
11	Ivano-Frankivsk-Nadvirna	13	West	201	Mykhailo Kostytsky; Yaroslava Stetsko		Congress of Ukrainian Nationalists	Ukrainian; Ukrainian
11	Ivano-Frankivsk-Rohatyn	13	West	202	Roman Krutsyk		Congress of Ukrainian Nationalists	Ukrainian
11	Ivano-Frankivsk-Rozhnyativ	13	West	203	Borys Kozhin			Russian
11	Ivano-Frankivsk-Sniatyn	13	West	204	Liliya Hryhorovych			Ukrainian
11	Ivano-Frankivsk-Tysmenytsia	13	West	205	Yevhen Pronyuk		Ukrainian Republican Party	Ukrainian
11	Ivano-Frankivsk-Tlumach	13	West	206	Petro Osadchuk			not identified
11	Ivano-Frankivsk	13	West	207				
12	Kyiv Oblast-Boryspil	16	Central	208	Mykhailo Zaborny; Ihor Bakai			Ukrainian; Ukrainian
12	Kyiv Oblast-Brovary	16	Central	209	Oleksandr Novikov			Russian
12	Kyiv Oblast-Vasylkiv	16	Central	210	Anatoliy Zasukha			Ukrainian
12	Kyiv Oblast-Irpin	16	Central	211	Serhiy Buryak			Ukrainian
12	Kyiv Oblast-Pereiaslav-Khmelnytskyi	16	Central	212	Hryhoriy Zahorodniy			Ukrainian
12	Kyiv Oblast-Fastiv	16	Central	213	Vitaliy Shevchenko		People's Movement of Ukraine	Ukrainian
12	Kyiv Oblast-Baryshivka	16	Central	214	Oleksandr Nidziyev			Russian
12	Kyiv Oblast-Bila Tserkva	16	Central	215	Volodymyr Kravchuk			Ukrainian
12	Kyiv Oblast-Vyshhorod	16	Central	216	Yaroslav Bardyn			Ukrainian
12	Kyiv Oblast-Volodarka	16	Central	217	Mykhailo Linchak			Ukrainian
12	Kyiv Oblast-Ivankiv	16	Central	218	Ivan Kirimov			Ukrainian
12	Kyiv Oblast-Kiyevo-Svyatoshynsky	16	Central	219	Yevhen Zhovtyak		People's Movement of Ukraine	Ukrainian
12	Kyiv Oblast-Makariv	16	Central	220	Roman Bezsmertny		Ukrainian Republican Party	Ukrainian
12	Kyiv Oblast-Myronivka	16	Central	221	Anatoliy Danylenko		Peasant Party of Ukraine	Ukrainian
12	Kyiv Oblast-Obukhiv	16	Central	222	Volodymyr Kulinych		People's Movement of Ukraine	Ukrainian
12	Kyiv Oblast-Tarashcha	16	Central	223	Oleksandr Moroz		Socialist Party of Ukraine	Ukrainian
13	Kirovohrad-Industrialny	10	Central	224	Valeriy Alyoshin		People's Movement of Ukraine	Russian
13	Kirovohrad-Tsentralny	10	Central	225	Valeriy Mishura		Communist Party of Ukraine	Ukrainian
13	Kirovohrad-Znamyanka	10	Central	226	Anatoliy Shalansky		Communist Party of Ukraine	Ukrainian
13	Kirovohrad-Oleksandria/Misky	10	Central	227	Valentyn Chebotaryov			Russian
13	Kirovohrad-Svitlovodsk	10	Central	228	Volodymyr Yavorivsky		Democratic Party of Ukraine	Ukrainian
13	Kirovohrad-Bobrynets	10	Central	229	Vasyl Durdynets; Yulia Tymoshenko			Ukrainian not identified
13	Kirovohrad-Haivoron	10	Central	230	Mykola Petrenko			Ukrainian
13	Kirovohrad-Mala Vyska	10	Central	231	Serhiy Sas			Ukrainian
13	Kirovohrad-Novoarkhanhelsk	10	Central	232	Valentyna Zavalevska			Ukrainian
13	Kirovohrad-Novoukrayinka	10	Central	233	Yuriy Tselykh		Communist Party of Ukraine	Ukrainian
13	Kirovohrad-Oleksandria	10	Central	234	Yevhen Marmazov		Communist Party of Ukraine	Russian
14	Luhansk-Artemivsky	24	East	235	Anatoliy Yagofyerov			Russian
14	Luhansk-Vatutinsky	24	East	236	Petro Styepanov		Communist Party of Ukraine	Chuvash
14	Luhansk-Zhovtnevy	24	East	237	Volodymyr Ilyushin		Communist Party of Ukraine	Russian
14	Luhansk-Kamianobridsky	24	East	238	Oleksandr Borzykh			Ukrainian
14	Luhansk-Leninsky	24	East	239	Valeriy Kolomoitsev			Ukrainian
14	Luhansk-Alchevsk	24	East	240	Serhiy Hmyrya		Communist Party of Ukraine	Ukrainian
14	Luhansk-Antratsyt	24	East	241	Valentyn Yeskov		Communist Party of Ukraine	Russian
14	Luhansk-Bryankivsky	24	East	242	Serhiy Sinchenko			Ukrainian
14	Luhansk-Krasnodon	24	East	243	Anatoliy Lyevchenko		Communist Party of Ukraine	Russian
14	Luhansk-Krasnyi Luch	24	East	244	Oleksiy Dmytrenko			Ukrainian
14	Luhansk-Lysychansk	24	East	245	Yehor Annyenkov		Communist Party of Ukraine	Russian
14	Luhansk-Pervomaisky	24	East	246	Yuriy Kryzsky		Communist Party of Ukraine	Ukrainian
14	Luhansk-Rovenky	24	East	247	Volodymyr Kocherha		Communist Party of Ukraine	Ukrainian
14	Luhansk-Rubizhne	24	East	248	Yuliy Ioffe			Jewish
14	Luhansk-Sverdlovsk	24	East	249	Petro Tsybenko		Communist Party of Ukraine	Ukrainian
14	Luhansk-Severodonetsk	24	East	250	Hryhoriy Dinyeikin			Russian
14	Luhansk-Stakhanov	24	East	251	Mykhailo Churuta		Communist Party of Ukraine	Ukrainian
14	Luhansk-Antratsyt	24	East	252	Viktor Bondarenko			Ukrainian
14	Luhansk-Bilovodsk	24	East	253	Oleksandr Cheryenkov		Communist Party of Ukraine	Russian
14	Luhansk-Lutuhine	24	East	254	Serhiy Aksenenko		Communist Party of Ukraine	Ukrainian
14	Luhansk-Perevalsk	24	East	255	Dmytro Pyetryenko		Communist Party of Ukraine	Russian
14	Luhansk-Svatove	24	East	256	Oleksandr Steshenko		Communist Party of Ukraine	Ukrainian
14	Luhansk-Slovyanoserbsk	24	East	257	Mykhailo Stepanov		Socialist Party of Ukraine	Ukrainian
14	Luhansk-Stanytsia Luhanska	24	East	258	Valentyn Ulanov		Communist Party of Ukraine	Russian
14	Luhansk-Starobilsk	24	East	259	Yuriy Donchenko		Communist Party of Ukraine	Russian
15	Lviv-Halytsky	23	West	260	Oleksandr Yemets		Party of Democratic Revival	Ukrainian
15	Lviv-Zaliznychny	23	West	261	Stepan Khmara		Ukrainian Conservative Republican Party	Ukrainian
15	Lviv	23	West	262				
15	Lviv-Lychakivsky	23	West	263	Ihor Yukhnovsky			Ukrainian
15	Lviv-Pivdenny	23	West	264	Viktor Pynzenyk			Ukrainian
15	Lviv-Frankivsky	23	West	265	Volodymyr Chemerys			Ukrainian
15	Lviv-Shevchenkivsky	23	West	266	Oleksandr Shandryuk		Ukrainian Republican Party	Ukrainian
15	Lviv-Drohobych/Misky	23	West	267	Leonid Tanyuk		People's Movement of Ukraine	Ukrainian
15	Lviv-Sambir	23	West	268	Taras Protsevyat		Congress of Ukrainian Nationalists	Ukrainian
15	Lviv-Stryi	23	West	269	Ihor Ostash			Ukrainian
15	Lviv-Chervonohrad	23	West	270	Yevhen Zherebetsky			Ukrainian
15	Lviv-Brody	23	West	271	Dmytro Chobit		People's Movement of Ukraine	Ukrainian
15	Lviv-Busk	23	West	272	Ihor Koliushko			Ukrainian
15	Lviv-Horodok	23	West	273	Taras Stetskiv		Party of Democratic Revival	Ukrainian
15	Lviv-Drihibych	23	West	274	Oleksandr Lavrynovych		People's Movement of Ukraine	Ukrainian
15	Lviv-Zhydachiv	23	West	275	Oleh Vitovych			Ukrainian
15	Lviv-Zhovkva	23	West	276	Petro Shvydky		Congress of Ukrainian Nationalists	Ukrainian
15	Lviv-Zolochiv	23	West	277	Lev Hlukhivsky			Ukrainian
15	Lviv-Mostyska	23	West	278	Ivan Bilas			Ukrainian
15	Lviv-Pustomyty	23	West	279	Mykhailo Kosiv		People's Movement of Ukraine	Ukrainian
15	Lviv-Sokal	23	West	280	Yaroslav Kendzyor		People's Movement of Ukraine	Ukrainian
15	Lviv-Turka	23	West	281	Hryhoriy Demian		Congress of Ukrainian Nationalists	Ukrainian
15	Lviv-Yavoriv	23	West	282	Yaroslav Ilyasevych			Ukrainian
16	Mykolaiv-Zavodsky	11	South	283	Volodymyr Yemyelianov			Russian
16	Mykolaiv-Koranelny	11	South	284	Serhiy Maiboroda		Communist Party of Ukraine	Ukrainian
16	Mykolaiv-Leninsky	11	South	285	Oleh Bozhenko		Communist Party of Ukraine	Russian
16	Mykolaiv-misky	11	South	286	Yuriy Zaporozhets			Russian
16	Mykolaiv-Tsentralny	11	South	287	Vasyl Kuziev		Communist Party of Ukraine	Ukrainian
16	Mykolaiv-Voznesensk	11	South	288	Yevhen Platovsky			Ukrainian
16	Mykolaiv-Pervomaisk	11	South	289	Anatoliy Agafonov			Russian
16	Mykolaiv-Domanivka	11	South	290	Ivan Hlukh		Peasant Party of Ukraine	Ukrainian
16	Mykolaiv-Silsky	11	South	291	Valeriy Palamarchuk			Ukrainian
16	Mykolaiv-Novyi Buh	11	South	292	Mykola Chyvyuk		Communist Party of Ukraine	Ukrainian
16	Mykolaiv-Snihurivka	11	South	293	Pavlo Shkrabak		Communist Party of Ukraine	Ukrainian
17	Odesa-Zhovtnevy	23	South	294	Eduard Hurvits			Jewish
17	Odesa-Illichivsky	23	South	295	Serhiy Dragomaryetskiy; Valeriy Serhiyenko		Communist Party of Ukraine	Russian; Ukrainian
17	Odesa-Kyivsky	23	South	296	Viktor Shishkin			Russian
17	Odesa-Malynovsky	23	South	297	Volodymyr Syevryukov			Russian
17	Odesa-Pivnichny	23	South	298	Valentyn Symonenko			Ukrainian
17	Odesa-Prymorsky	23	South	299	Yuriy Karmazin			not identified
17	Odesa	23	South	300				
17	Odesa-Tayirovsky	23	South	301	Valeriy Yevdokimov			Russian
17	Odesa	23	South	302				
17	Odesa-Chornomorsky	23	South	303	Anatoliy Lobenko			Ukrainian
17	Odesa-Bilhorod-Dnistrovsky	23	South	304	Vasyl Honchar			Ukrainian
17	Odesa-Izmail	23	South	305	Yuriy Kruk			Russian
17	Odesa-Kotovsk	23	South	306	Petro Melnyk		Communist Party of Ukraine	Ukrainian
17	Odesa-Morsky	23	South	307	Vadym Plotkin			Ukrainian
17	Odesa-Biliaivka	23	South	308	Dmytro Popov			Bulgarian
17	Odesa-Bolhrad	23	South	309	Volodymyr Nemyrovsky		Communist Party of Ukraine	Ukrainian
17	Odesa-Velyka Mykhailivka	23	South	310	Mykhailo Myaskovsky; Andriy Zvonarzh		Communist Party of Ukraine; Communist Party of Ukraine	Ukrainian; Ukrainian
17	Odesa-Ivanivka	23	South	311	Volodymyr Hovorun			Ukrainian
17	Odesa-Kiliya	23	South	312	Ruslan Bodelan			Ukrainian
17	Odesa-Kominternivske	23	South	313	Valeriy Titenko		Peasant Party of Ukraine	Ukrainian
17	Odesa-Savran	23	South	314	Vyacheslav Sokerchak		Communist Party of Ukraine	Ukrainian
17	Odesa-Tarutyne	23	South	315	Vasyl Tsushko		Peasant Party of Ukraine	Moldavian
17	Odesa-Tatarbunary	23	South	316	Hryhoriy Rychagov		Social Democratic Party of Ukraine	Russian
18	Poltava-Kyivsky	16	Central	317	Vyacheslav Bilous			Ukrainian
18	Poltava-Leninsky	16	Central	318	Volodymyr Holovko			Belarusian
18	Poltava-Oktyabrsky	16	Central	319	Vladyslav Nosov			Russian
18	Poltava-Komsomolsk	16	Central	320	Serhiy Teryokhin			Ukrainian
18	Poltava-Kremenchuk/Avtozavodsky	16	Central	321	Viktor Taran			Ukrainian
18	Poltava-Kremenchuk/Kryukivsky	16	Central	322	Hryhoriy Omelchenko			Ukrainian
18	Poltava-Lubny	16	Central	323	Mykola Karnaukh			Ukrainian
18	Poltava-Myrhorod	16	Central	324	Yevhen Marchuk			Ukrainian
18	Poltava-Hadyach	16	Central	325	Mykhailo Kovalko			Ukrainian
18	Poltava-Hlobyne	16	Central	326	Petro Kivshyk			Ukrainian
18	Poltava-Karlivka	16	Central	327	Volodymyr Kapustyan			Ukrainian
18	Poltava-Kobelyaky	16	Central	328	Anatoliy Kulakov			Ukrainian
18	Poltava-Lokhvytsia	16	Central	329	Mykola Kyrychenko		Communist Party of Ukraine	Ukrainian
18	Poltava-Orzhytsia	16	Central	330	Oleksandr Masenko		Communist Party of Ukraine	Ukrainian
18	Poltava-Poltava	16	Central	331	Vasyl Stepenko		Peasant Party of Ukraine	Ukrainian
18	Poltava-Khorol	16	Central	332	Leonid Vernyhora			Ukrainian
19	Rivne-Veresnevy	10	West	333	Volodymyr Kovtunets		People's Movement of Ukraine	Ukrainian
19	Rivne-Zamkovy	10	West	334	Roman Omelchuk		People's Movement of Ukraine	Ukrainian
19	Rivne-Dubno	10	West	335	Vasyl Chervoniy		People's Movement of Ukraine	Ukrainian
19	Rivne-Volodymyrets	10	West	336	Viktor Petruk			Ukrainian
19	Rivne-Hoshcha	10	West	337	Bohdan Yaroshynsky		Ukrainian Republican Party	Ukrainian
19	Rivne-Dubrovytsia	10	West	338	Mykola Khomych			Ukrainian
19	Rivne-Zdolbuniv	10	West	339	Oleh Matkovsky		People's Movement of Ukraine	Ukrainian
19	Rivne-Kostopil	10	West	340	Volodymyr Shevchenko			Ukrainian
19	Rivne-Rivne	10	West	341	Mykola Porovsky		Ukrainian Republican Party	Ukrainian
19	Rivne-Sarny	10	West	342	Oleksandr Buryachynsky			not identified
20	Sumy	13	East	343				
20	Sumy	13	East	344				
20	Sumy-Hlukhiv	13	East	345	Mykola Lavrynenko		Socialist Party of Ukraine	Ukrainian
20	Sumy-Konotop	13	East	346	Vitaliy Yurkovsky; Nataliya Vitrenko		Communist Party of Ukraine; Socialist Party of Ukraine	Ukrainian; Ukrainian
20	Sumy-Okhtyrka	13	East	347	Volodymyr Tkachenko		People's Movement of Ukraine	Ukrainian
20	Sumy-Romny	13	East	348	Volodymyr Marchenko		Socialist Party of Ukraine	Ukrainian
20	Sumy-Shostka	13	East	349	Volodymyr Storizhko			Ukrainian
20	Sumy-Bilopillia	13	East	350	Valeriy Cherep			Ukrainian
20	Sumy-Krolevets	13	East	351	Vasyl Radko		Communist Party of Ukraine	Ukrainian
20	Sumy-Lebedyn	13	East	352	Anatoliy Zolotaryov			Ukrainian
20	Sumy-Sumy	13	East	353	Oleksiy Chernyavsky		Peasant Party of Ukraine	Ukrainian
20	Sumy-Trostyanets	13	East	354	Yuriy Bublyk		Communist Party of Ukraine	Ukrainian
20	Sumy-Yampil	13	East	355	Ivan Hrintsov		Communist Party of Ukraine	Ukrainian
21	Ternopil-Halytsky	10	West	356	Bohdan Horyn		Ukrainian Republican Party	Ukrainian
21	Ternopil-Podilsky	10	West	357	Vyacheslav Chornovil		People's Movement of Ukraine	Ukrainian
21	Ternopil-Berezhany	10	West	358	Leon Horokhivsky		Ukrainian Republican Party	Ukrainian
21	Ternopil-Borshchiv	10	West	359	Mykola Horbal		Ukrainian Republican Party	Ukrainian
21	Ternopil-Husyatyn	10	West	360	Bohdan Boiko			Ukrainian
21	Ternopil-Zbarazh	10	West	361	Mykhailo Ratushny		Congress of Ukrainian Nationalists	Ukrainian
21	Ternopil-Zboriv	10	West	362	Andriy Zarudny		People's Movement of Ukraine	Ukrainian
21	Ternopil-Kremenets	10	West	363	Oleksandr Ihnatenko			Ukrainian
21	Ternopil-Terebovlia	10	West	364	Roman Kuper; Leonid Kravchuk		Ukrainian Conservative Republican Party	Ukrainian; Ukrainian
21	Ternopil-Chortkiv	10	West	365	Yuriy Tyma			Ukrainian
22	Kharkiv-Vuzivsky	28	East	366	Volodymyr Semynozhenko			Ukrainian
22	Kharkiv	28	East	367				
22	Kharkiv-Zhovtnevy	28	East	368	Mykola Kashlyakov		Communist Party of Ukraine	Russian
22	Kharkiv-Industrialny	28	East	369	Volodymyr Alyeksyeyev		Civil Congress of Ukraine	Russian
22	Kharkiv-Kyivsky	28	East	370	Volodymyr Mykhin		Socialist Party of Ukraine	Russian
22	Kharkiv-Kominternivsky	28	East	371	Oleh Dyomin			Russian
22	Kharkiv-Komsomolsky	28	East	372	Oleh Taranov			Russian
22	Kharkiv-Leninsky	28	East	373	Oleksandr Karpov			Ukrainian
22	Kharkiv-Moskovsky	28	East	374	Volodymyr Pyekhota			Ukrainian
22	Kharkiv-Ordzhonikidzevsky	28	East	375	Leonid Harmash		Communist Party of Ukraine	not identified
22	Kharkiv	28	East	376				
22	Kharkiv	28	East	377				
22	Kharkiv-Frunzensky	28	East	378	Viktor Musiyanka			Ukrainian
22	Kharkiv-Chervonozavodsky	28	East	379	Oleh Chornousenko			Ukrainian
22	Kharkiv-Izyum	28	East	380	Petro Didyk			Ukrainian
22	Kharkiv-Kupiansk	28	East	381	Oleksandr Chupakhin		Socialist Party of Ukraine	Russian
22	Kharkiv-Lozova	28	East	382	Mykola Bychenko		Communist Party of Ukraine	Ukrainian
22	Kharkiv-Lyubotynsky	28	East	383	Viktor Suslov			Russian
22	Kharkiv-Pervomaisky	28	East	384	Volodymyr Pustovoitovsky		Communist Party of Ukraine	Jewish
22	Kharkiv-Chuhuiv	28	East	385	Bronislav Raikovsky		Communist Party of Ukraine	Polish
22	Kharkiv-Balaklia	28	East	386	Valentyna Hoshovska			Ukrainian
22	Kharkiv-Bohodukhiv	28	East	387	Vladlen Karasyk			Ukrainian
22	Kharkiv-Valky	28	East	388	Borys Olkhovsky			Ukrainian
22	Kharkiv-Vovchansk	28	East	389	Anatoliy Kosolapov			Ukrainian
22	Kharkiv-Derhachi	28	East	390	Oleksandr Bandurka			Ukrainian
22	Kharkiv-Zmiiv	28	East	391	Oleksiy Berezhny			Ukrainian
22	Kharkiv-Krasnohrad	28	East	392	Oleksandr Kudrevych			Ukrainian
22	Kharkiv-Kahrkiv	28	East	393	Vasyl Ivanov		Communist Party of Ukraine	Russian
23	Kherson-Dniprovsky	11	South	394	Oleksandr Yelyashkevych			Belarusian
23	Kherson	11	South	395				
23	Kherson-Suvorovsky	11	South	396	Heorhiy Naida		Communist Party of Ukraine	not identified
23	Kherson	11	South	397				
23	Kherson-Nova Kakhovka	11	South	398	Anatoliy Bezuhly		Communist Party of Ukraine	Ukrainian
23	Kherson-Velyka Lepetykha	11	South	399	Andriy Snihach		Communist Party of Ukraine	Ukrainian
23	Kherson-Velyka Oleksandrivka	11	South	400	Serhiy Dovhan		Peasant Party of Ukraine	Ukrainian
23	Kherson-Hola Prystan	11	South	401	Yuriy Slastyon			Ukrainian
23	Kherson-Ivanivka	11	South	402	Stanislav Nikolayenko		Socialist Party of Ukraine	Ukrainian
23	Kherson-Chaplynka	11	South	403	Kateryna Samoilyk		Communist Party of Ukraine	Ukrainian
23	Kherson-Tsyurupinsk	11	South	404	Oleksandr Malyevsky		Communist Party of Ukraine	Ukrainian
24	Khmelnytskyi-Zavodsky	13	West	405	Ivan Rudyk			Ukrainian
24	Khmelnytskyi-Tsentralny	13	West	406	Mykhailo Pavlovsky		Ukrainian Republican Party	Ukrainian
24	Khmelnytskyi-Kamianets-Podilskyi	13	West	407	Valentyn Yablonsky			Ukrainian
24	Khmelnytskyi-Slavuta	13	West	408	Mykola Dudchenko			Russian
24	Khmelnytskyi-Shepetivka	13	West	409	Vasyl Verkhohlyad			Ukrainian
24	Khmelnytskyi-Volochysk	13	West	410	Anatoliy Holovko			Ukrainian
24	Khmelnytskyi-Horodok	13	West	411	Yosyp Vinsky		Socialist Party of Ukraine	Ukrainian
24	Khmelnytskyi-Dunaivtsi	13	West	412	Valentyn Yakovenko		Peasant Party of Ukraine	Ukrainian
24	Khmelnytskyi-Izyaslav	13	West	413	Volodymyr Bortnyk			Ukrainian
24	Khmelnytskyi-Letychiv	13	West	414	Ivan Chyzh		Socialist Party of Ukraine	Ukrainian
24	Khmelnytskyi-Starokostyantyniv	13	West	415	Viktor Semenchuk			Ukrainian
24	Khmelnytskyi-Chemerivtsi	13	West	416	Vasyl Svyato			Ukrainian
24	Khmelnytskyi-Yarmolyntsi	13	West	417	Ivan Sakhan		Communist Party of Ukraine	Ukrainian
25	Cherkasy-Prydniprovsky	13	Central	418	Mykhailo Syrota			Ukrainian
25	Cherkasy-Sosnivsky	13	Central	419	Volodymyr Pivtorak			Ukrainian
25	Cherkasy-Zolotonosha	13	Central	420	Hryhoriy Dikhtyarenko			Ukrainian
25	Cherkasy-Kaniv	13	Central	421	Maria Shulezhko			Ukrainian
25	Cherkasy-Smila	13	Central	422	Borys Ponomarenko			Ukrainian
25	Cherkasy-Uman	13	Central	423	Viktor Royenko		Communist Party of Ukraine	Ukrainian
25	Cherkasy-Monastyryshche	13	Central	424	Omelyan Parubok		Communist Party of Ukraine	Ukrainian
25	Cherkasy-Zvenyhorodka	13	Central	425	Serhiy Pasko			Ukrainian
25	Cherkasy-Talne	13	Central	426	Vadym Hetman			Ukrainian
25	Cherkasy-Cherkasy	13	Central	427	Yuriy Karasyk			Ukrainian
25	Cherkasy-Chyhyryn	13	Central	428	Ivan Vasyura		Peasant Party of Ukraine	Ukrainian
25	Cherkasy-Chornobai	13	Central	429	Petro Dusheiko		Peasant Party of Ukraine	Ukrainian
25	Cherkasy-Shpola	13	Central	430	Oleksandr Tkachenko		Peasant Party of Ukraine	Ukrainian
26	Chernivtsi-Leninsky	8	West	431	Taras Kyiak		Democratic Party of Ukraine	Ukrainian
26	Chernivtsi-Pershotravnevy	8	West	432	Oleh Ishchenko			Ukrainian
26	Chernivtsi-Vyzhnytsia	8	West	433	Yevhen Lupakov			Ukrainian
26	Chernivtsi-Hlyboka	8	West	434	Ivan Popesku			Romanian
26	Chernivtsi-Zastavna	8	West	435	Heorhiy Manchulenko		People's Movement of Ukraine	Ukrainian
26	Chernivtsi-Kelmentsi	8	West	436	Hryhoriy Dovhanchyn			Ukrainian
26	Chernivtsi-Kitsman	8	West	437	Heorhiy Filipchuk			Ukrainian
26	Chernivtsi-Novoselytsia	8	West	438	Yuriy Buzduhan		Social Democratic Party of Ukraine	Ukrainian
27	Chernihiv-Desnyansky	12	Central	439	Oleksandr Styepanov			Russian
27	Chernihiv-Novozavodsky	12	Central	440	Ivan Symonenko		Party of Labor	Ukrainian
27	Chernihiv-Nizhyn	12	West	441	Mykola Chumachenko		Communist Party of Ukraine	Ukrainian
27	Chernihiv-Pryluky	12	Central	442	Halyna Radchenko			Ukrainian
27	Chernihiv-Bakhmach	12	Central	443	Mykola Chumak		Communist Party of Ukraine	Ukrainian
27	Chernihiv-Bobrovytsia	12	Central	444	Petro Sheiko			Ukrainian
27	Chernihiv-Brozna	12	Central	445	Ivan Plyushch			Ukrainian
27	Chernihiv-Kozelets	12	Central	446	Vitaliy Masol			Ukrainian
27	Chernihiv-Mena	12	Central	447	Oleksandr Borovyk		Peasant Party of Ukraine	Ukrainian
27	Chernihiv-Novhorod-Siversky	12	Central	448	Leonid Kuchma; Vasyl Yevtukhov			Ukrainian; Ukrainian
27	Chernihiv-Ripky	12	Central	449	Anatoliy Dron			Ukrainian
27	Chernihiv-Chernihiv	12	Central	450	Hennadiy Dolzhenko		Communist Party of Ukraine	Russian

== Regional rankings ==
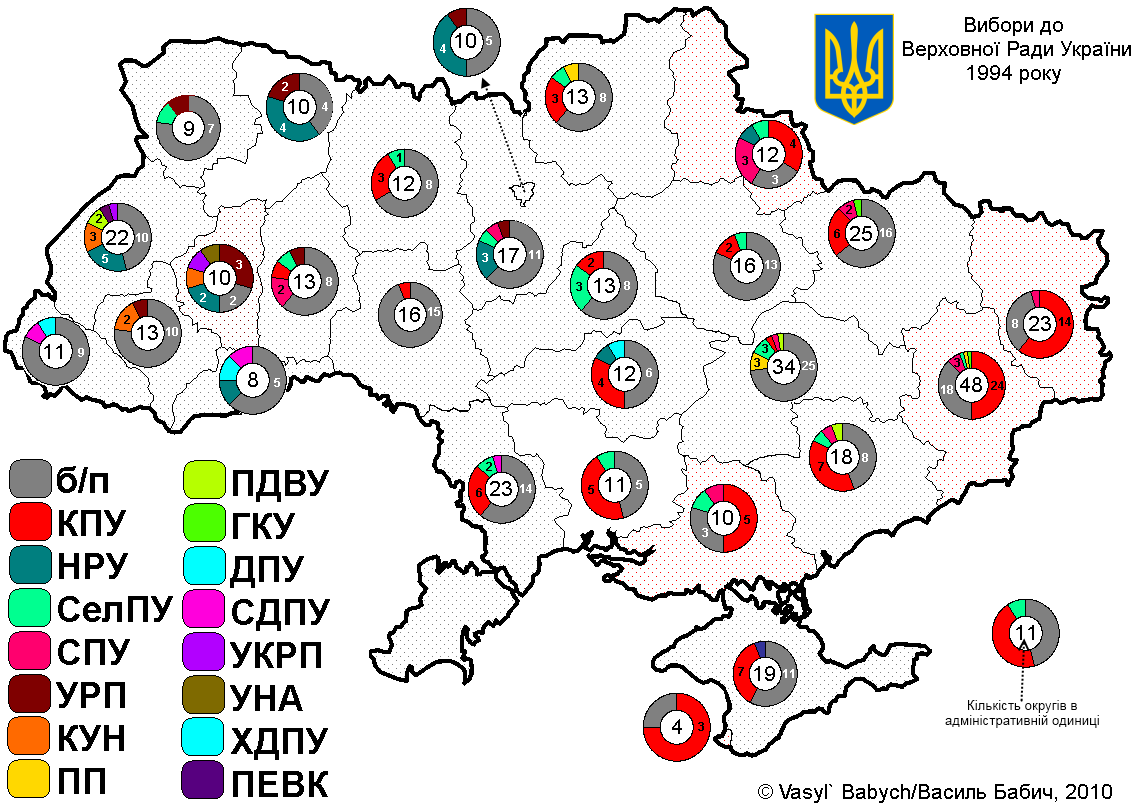
Results of the 1994 Ukrainian parliamentary (Verkhovna Rada) elections. б/п - "non-partisan" КПУ - "Communist Party of Ukraine" НРУ - "People's Movement of Ukraine (Rukh)" СелПУ - "Peasant Party of Ukraine" СПУ - "Socialist Party of Ukraine" УРП - "Ukrainian Republican Party" КУН - "Congress of Ukrainian Nationalists" ПП - "Labour Party" ПДВУ - "Party of Democratic Revival of Ukraine" ГКУ - "Ukrainian Civic Congress" ДПУ - "Democratic Party of Ukraine" СДПУ - "Social Democratic Party of Ukraine" УКРП - "Ukrainian Conservative Republican Party" УНА - "Ukrainian National Assembly" ХДПУ - "Christian Democratic Party of Ukraine" ПЕВК - "Crimean Economic Revival Party"

=== by party ===
Crimea (19)

- No party affiliation (11)
- Communist Party of Ukraine (7)
- Party of Economic Revival of Crimea (1)

Vinnytsia Region (16)

- No party affiliation (15)
- Communist Party of Ukraine (1)

Volyn Region (9)

- No party affiliation (7)
- Ukrainian Republican Party (1)
- Democratic Party of Ukraine (1)

Dnipropetrovsk Region (34)

- No party affiliation (25)
- Labor Party (3)
- Peasant Party of Ukraine (3)
- Communist Party of Ukraine (1)
- Socialist Party of Ukraine (1)
- Party of Democratic Revival of Ukraine (1)

Donetsk Region (48)

- Communist Party of Ukraine (24)
- No party affiliation (18)
- Socialist Party of Ukraine (3)
- Peasant Party of Ukraine (1)
- Labor Party (1)
- Democratic Party of Ukraine (1)

Zhytomyr Region (12)

- No party affiliation (8)
- Communist Party of Ukraine (3)
- Peasant Party of Ukraine (1)

Zakarpattia Region (11)

- No party affiliation (9)
- Social-Democratic Party of Ukraine (1)
- Christian Democratic Party of Ukraine (1)

Zaporizhzhia Region (18)

- No party affiliation (8)
- Communist Party of Ukraine (7)
- Party of Democratic Revival of Ukraine (1)
- Socialist Party of Ukraine (1)
- Peasant Party of Ukraine (1)

Ivano-Frankivsk Region (13)

- No party affiliation (10)
- Congress of Ukrainian Nationalists (2)
- Ukrainian Republican Party (1)

Kirovohrad Region (12)

- No party affiliation (6)
- Communist Party of Ukraine (4)
- People's Movement of Ukraine (1)
- Democratic Party of Ukraine (1)

Luhansk Region (23)

- Communist Party of Ukraine (14)
- No party affiliation (8)
- Socialist Party of Ukraine (1)

Lviv Region (22)

- No party affiliation (10)
- People's Movement of Ukraine (5)
- Congress of Ukrainian Nationalists (3)
- Party of Democratic Revival of Ukraine (2)
- Ukrainian Republican Party (1)
- Ukrainian Conservative Republican Party (1)

Mykolaiv Region (11)

- No party affiliation (5)
- Communist Party of Ukraine (5)
- Peasant Party of Ukraine (1)

Odesa Region (23)

- No party affiliation (14)
- Communist Party of Ukraine (6)
- Peasant Party of Ukraine (2)
- Socialist Party of Ukraine (1)

Kyiv Region (17)

- No party affiliation (11)
- People's Movement of Ukraine (3)
- Socialist Party of Ukraine (1)
- Peasant Party of Ukraine (1)
- Ukrainian Republican Party (1)

Poltava Region (16)

- No party affiliation (13)
- Communist Party of Ukraine (2)
- Peasant Party of Ukraine (1)

Rivne Region (10)

- No party affiliation (4)
- People's Movement of Ukraine (4)
- Ukrainian Republican Party (2)

Sumy Region (12)

- Communist Party of Ukraine (4)
- Socialist Party of Ukraine (3)
- No party affiliation (3)
- People's Movement of Ukraine (1)
- Peasant Party of Ukraine (1)

Ternopil Region (10)

- Ukrainian Republican Party (3)
- People's Movement of Ukraine (2)
- No party affiliation (2)
- Congress of Ukrainian Nationalists (1)
- Ukrainian National Assembly (1)
- Ukrainian Conservative Republican Party (1)

Kharkiv Region (25)

- No party affiliation (16)
- Communist Party of Ukraine (6)
- Socialist Party of Ukraine (2)
- Peasant Party of Ukraine (1)

Kherson Region (10)

- Communist Party of Ukraine (5)
- No party affiliation (3)
- Socialist Party of Ukraine (1)
- Peasant Party of Ukraine (1)

Khmelnytskyi Region (13)

- No party affiliation (8)
- Socialist Party of Ukraine (2)
- Ukrainian Republican Party (1)
- Communist Party of Ukraine (1)
- Peasant Party of Ukraine (1)

Cherkasy Region (13)

- No party affiliation (8)
- Peasant Party of Ukraine (3)
- Communist Party of Ukraine (2)

Chernivtsi Region (8)

- No party affiliation (5)
- People's Movement of Ukraine (1)
- Socialist Party of Ukraine (1)
- Peasant Party of Ukraine (1)

Chernihiv Region (13)

- No party affiliation (8)
- Communist Party of Ukraine (3)
- Labor Party (1)
- Peasant Party of Ukraine (1)

Kyiv (11/23)

- No party affiliation (6)
- People's Movement of Ukraine (4)
- Ukrainian Republican Party (1)

Sevastopol (4)

- Communist Party of Ukraine (3)
- No party affiliation (1)

=== by nationality ===
Kyiv (11/23)

- Ukrainian (9)
- Russian (1)
- Bulgarian (1)

Sevastopol (4)

- Russian (2)
- Ukrainian (1)
- Not identified (1)

Crimea (19)

- Russian (9)
- Ukrainian (6)
- Jewish (2)
- Karaite (1)
- Not identified (1)

Vinnytsia Region (16/17)

- Ukrainian (14)
- Russian (1)
- Polish (1)

Volyn Region (8/9)

- Ukrainian (8)

Dnipropetrovsk Region (34)

- Ukrainian (28)
- Russian (4)
- Not identified (2)

Donetsk Region (47)

- Ukrainian (27→26)
- Russian (18→19)
- Adyghe (1)
- Jewish (1)

Zhytomyr Region (12/13)

- Ukrainian (10)
- Russian (1)
- German (1)

Zakarpattia Region (10)

- Ukrainian (8)
- Russian (1)
- Hungarian (1)

Zaporizhzhia Region (18)

- Ukrainian (12)
- Russian (6)

Ivano-Frankivsk Region (12/13)

- Ukrainian (10)
- Russian (1)
- Not identified (1)

Kyiv Region (16)

- Ukrainian (14)
- Russian (2)

Kirovohrad Region (10)

- Ukrainian (7→6)
- Russian (3)
- Not identified (0→1)

Luhansk Region (24)

- Ukrainian (12)
- Russian (10)
- Chuvash (1)
- Jewish (1)

Lviv Region (22/23)

- Ukrainian (22)

Mykolaiv Region (11)

- Ukrainian (7)
- Russian (4)

Odesa Region (21/23)

- Ukrainian (12→13)
- Russian (6→5)
- Jewish (1)
- Moldavian (1)
- Bulgarian (1)
- Not identified (1)

Poltava Region (16)

- Ukrainian (14)
- Russian (1)
- Belarusian (1)

Rivne Region (10)

- Ukrainian (9)
- Not identified (1)

Sumy Region (11/13)

- Ukrainian (11)

Ternopil Regin (10)

- Ukrainian (10)

Kharkiv Region (25/28)

- Ukrainian (14)
- Russian (8)
- Jewish (1)
- Polish (1)
- Not identified (1)

Kherson Region (9/11)

- Ukrainian (7)
- Belarusian (1)
- Not identified (1)

Khmelnytskyi Region (13)

- Ukrainian (12)
- Russian (1)

Cherkasy Region (13)

- Ukrainian (13)

Chernivtsi Region (8)

- Ukrainian (7)
- Romanian (1)

Chernihiv Region (12)

- Ukrainian (10)
- Russian (2)

== Aftermath ==
Due to the low turnout, 112 seats remained vacant and later in the summer of 1994 (24 and 31 July and 7 August) 20 MPs were elected to the Rada. On 20 November and 4 December nine more MPs were elected.

On 30 May 1994 MP Roman Kuper died of a heart attack and Leonid Kravchuk was elected as his replacement on 25 September. On 15 July Leonid Kuchma surrendered his parliamentarian mandate after being elected President, and Vasyl Yevrukhov was elected in his place. On 21 August MP Vitaliy Yurkovsky died, and was replaced by Natalya Vitrenko.
