= Petro Didyk =

Petro Didyk may refer to:

- Petro Didyk (footballer)
- Petro Didyk (politician)
