= Ivan Hlukh =

Ukrainian politician (born 1950)

- Іван Глух
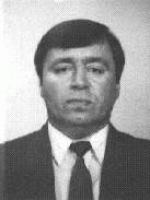

Member of Verkhovna Rada
- In office 11 May 1994 – 12 May 1998

Personal details
- Born: August 11, 1950 (age 76) Skorodne, Ukrainian SSR (now in Poland)
- Children: 2
- Education: Kherson State Agrarian and Economic University, Odesa University
- Occupation: Politician

Ivan Vasylovych Hlukh (Ukrainian: Іван Васильович Глух; born August 11, 1950) is a Ukrainian politician, Deputy of Ukraine of the 2nd Convocation of Verkhovna Rada (1994–1998).

== Biography ==
Ivan Hlukh was born on August 11, 1950, in Skorodne, Drohobych Oblast, Ukrainian SSR.

In 1969, he graduated from the Nikopol Agricultural College and worked as an engineer at the Dnipropetrovsk Regional Department of Land Reclamation and Water Management.

From 1973, he served as the chief engineer and later became the head of the municipal enterprise complex in Domanivka, Mykolaiv Oblast.

In 1980, he graduated from the Kherson Agricultural Institute.

From 1986, he served as the chairman of the board of the collective farm (in 1993 transformed into a collective agricultural enterprise) Kolos in Domanivskyi District.

In 1993, he completed his education at the Odesa I.I. Mechnikov State University. He became a member of Peasant Party of Ukraine.

From September 1997 to March 1999, he worked as an assistant to the Prime Minister of Ukraine.

From March 1999 to March 2000, he served as the deputy chairman of the Committee on Horticulture, Viticulture, and Winemaking. Later, he became the 1st Deputy Chairman of the State Concern for Horticulture, Viticulture, and Winemaking of Ukraine.

== Parliamentary activity ==
In 1994, he was elected as a People's Deputy of Ukraine representing the Domanivka Electoral District No. 290. He was a member of the Committee on Agriculture and Land Resources and the Social Development of Rural Areas. He was also a member of the parliamentary faction of the Agrarian Party of Ukraine.

== Awards ==
He was awarded the Order of Merit of the 3rd degree in November 1997.

== Family ==
Ivan Hluk is married and has two sons.
