= 1994 Ukrainian presidential election =

Election of Leonid Kuchma

- 26 June 1994 (first round); 10 July 1994 (second round)
- Turnout: 70.37% (first round) ▼13.81pp 71.63% (second round)
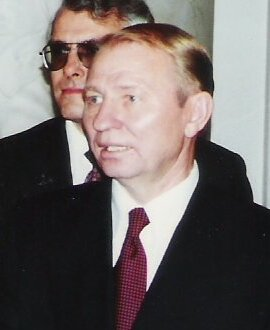

| Nominee | Leonid Kuchma | Leonid Kravchuk |
| Party | Independent | Independent |
| Popular vote | 14,016,850 | 12,111,603 |
| Percentage | 52.35% | 45.24% |
President before election
Leonid Kravchuk
Independent
Elected President
Leonid Kuchma
Independent

Early presidential elections were held in Ukraine on 26 June 1994, with a second round on 10 July. They were held ahead of schedule following a compromise between President Leonid Kravchuk and the Verkhovna Rada, the Ukrainian parliament. The elections saw Kravchuk defeated by his former Prime Minister Leonid Kuchma. They were the first presidential elections in the Commonwealth of Independent States in which the incumbent was defeated.

Kuchma took office on 19 July, marking the first peaceful transfer of power in Ukraine since the fall of Communism.

== Background ==
On 17 June 1993, the Verkhovna Rada voted to hold a referendum on 26 September that would serve as a motion of no confidence in President Kravchuk. However, the referendum was cancelled two days before it was due to be held. The Verkhovna Rada instead decided to hold early parliamentary elections on 24 March 1994, and early presidential elections two months later.

== Results ==
In the first round, Kravchuk was supported by the People's Movement (which had originally collected signatures for Volodymyr Lanovyi) and the Democratic Association, an alliance of right-wing parties that viewed Kuchma as pro-Russian. Kuchma was supported by the Interregional Bloc of Reforms, and Socialist Party candidate Oleksandr Moroz was supported by the Communist Party and Peasant Party. After Moroz was knocked out, the Communists supported Kuchma in the second round.

| Candidate | Party | First round | | Second round | |
| Candidate | Party | Votes | % | Votes | % |
|---|---|---|---|---|---|
| Leonid Kravchuk | Independent (Note: Supported by the People's Movement of Ukraine, the Democratic Association, and the parliamentary blocs "Statehood", "Agrarians of Ukraine" and "Centre") | 9,977,766 | 38.36 | 12,111,603 | 45.24 |
| Leonid Kuchma | Independent (Note: Supported by the parliamentary Inter-regional Bloc of Reforms. Also supported by the Communist Party of Ukraine in the second round.) | 8,274,806 | 31.81 | 14,016,850 | 52.35 |
| Oleksandr Moroz | Socialist Party of Ukraine (Note: Supported by the Communist Party of Ukraine) | 3,466,541 | 13.33 | | |
| Volodymyr Lanovyi | Independent (Note: Supported by the faction of People's Movement of Ukraine and the parliamentary bloc "Reforms") | 2,483,986 | 9.55 | | |
| Valeriy Babych | Independent | 644,263 | 2.48 | | |
| Ivan Plyushch | Independent (Note: Supported by the Ukrainian Republican Party) | 321,886 | 1.24 | | |
| Petro Talanchuk | Independent (Note: Supported by the Congress of Ukrainian Nationalists) | 143,361 | 0.55 | | |
| Against all | | 697,564 | 2.68 | 645,508 | 2.41 |
| Total | | 26,010,173 | 100.00 | 26,773,961 | 100.00 |
| Valid votes | | 26,010,173 | 98.22 | 26,773,961 | 99.59 |
| Invalid/blank votes | | 470,498 | 1.78 | 109,681 | 0.41 |
| Total votes | | 26,480,671 | 100.00 | 26,883,642 | 100.00 |
| Registered voters/turnout | | 37,630,835 | 70.37 | 37,531,666 | 71.63 |
Source: Nohlen & Stöver
