= Slavic Party =

Slavic Party Слов'янська партія
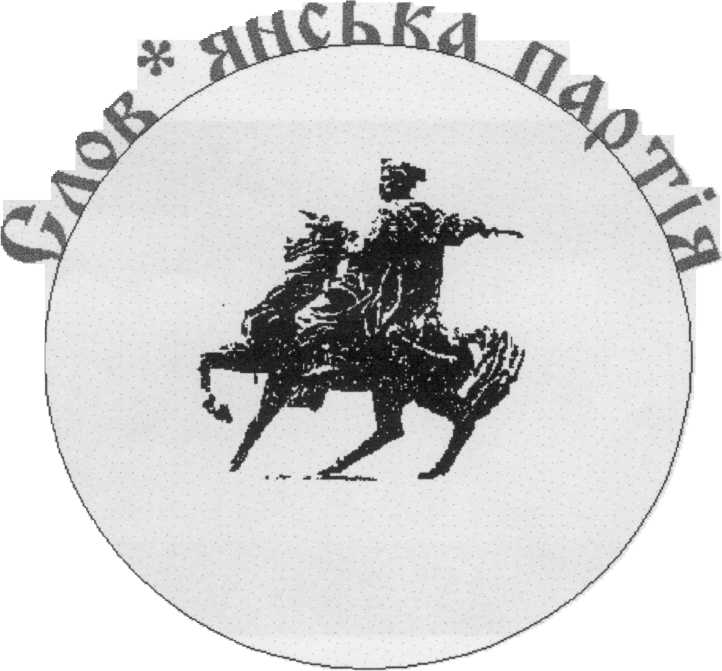
- Russian name: Славянская партия
- Leader: Oleksandr Luzan
- Founded: 10 June 1993 (32 years, 333 days)
- Banned: 22 October 2024 (1 year, 199 days)
- Headquarters: Donetsk, Ukraine
- Ideology: Pan-Slavism; Russian nationalism
- National affiliation: Left Opposition (2015–2022)

Website
- Website

Slavic Party (Ukrainian: Слов'янська партія, Slovianska Partiya) was a political party of Ukraine, previously known as Civil Congress of Ukraine (Civil Union).

== Historical background ==
=== Creation of Civil Congress (assembly) ===
On March 21, 1992, in Kharkiv took place a consultative meeting of some politicians from eastern regions of Ukraine. At the meeting it was decided to create a new political power. For that reason on May 16 in Donetsk under leadership of Mykola Azarov was conducted a congress that adopted the name of future organization - Civil Congress of Ukraine (Russian: Гражданский конгресс Украины, Grazhdanskiy Kongress Ukrainy; GKU), an assembly of Russophone population of Ukraine. The congress elected provisional co-chairmen GKU Oleksandr Bazyliuk (leader of "Movement for revival of Donbas"), Valeriy Meshcheriakov (MP), and Mykola Ragozin (leader of "Democratic Donbas"). Members of the provisional working presidium became Anatoliy Volchenko (Kharkiv division of the "Movement of democratic reforms"), Pavlo Khaimovych (Public organization "Elections 89"), Dmytro Kornilov (Interfront of the Donbass), Oleksandr Luzan ("Civil forum of Ukraine"), and Vladislav Karabulin (Don Cossacks).

On October 3, 1992, in Donetsk under the leadership of Pavlo Khaimovych took place the second congress where was officially created the Civil Congress of Ukraine. Co-chairmen of the GKU became Oleksandr Bazyliuk (Movement for revival of Donbas), and parliamentarians Valeriy Meshcheriakov and Volodymyr Terekhov. It also was decided that based on the congress to create two political parties: economically oriented Party of Labor and its political ally - Civil Union (headed by Oleksandr Bazyliuk). During the congress a more radical group ceded away and created the Party of Slavic Unity of Ukraine (Russian National Unity, Slavic Union, National Alliance of Russian Solidarists, others). At the constituent congress of GKU were represented following organizations:

- Civil forum (served as foundation for GKU)
- Motherland forum
- Slavic Union
- Patriotic Club "Rodina" (Motherland)
- National Alliance of Russian Solidarists
- remnants and numerous org-committees, associations and communities of Russophone population

=== Creation of Civil Congress (party) ===
With time Party of Labor distanced itself from the Civil Union and the last was left in GKU de facto by itself. On June 10, 1993, the Civil Union was officially registered as a political party under the name of Civil Congress of Ukraine.The main program of GKU was emphasized in four main points:

- Bilateral relations with the Russian Federation and other states about dual citizenship
- Preservation of broadcasting television programs from Ostnkino and RTR
- Granting the Russian language a status of the second state language
- Reinforcement of the Commonwealth of Independent States

On September 18, 1993, in Kyiv took place the third congress of GKU led by Oleksandr Bazyliuk.

On December 18–19, 1993 in Kharkiv took place the fourth congress of GKU in order to nominate candidates of parliamentarians for the 1994 Ukrainian parliamentary election. At the congress the ideology of the party was identified as left-centrist. During the elections only two candidates were successful: Volodymyr Alekseyev (Electoral district 369, Industrial) and Yuriy Boldyriov (Electoral district 112, Kirovsk-Shakhtarsk). Both of them, however, oscillated from GKU after being elected.

At the 1994 Presidential elections GKU supported both Leonid Kuchma and Oleksandr Moroz and at the second round - Leonid Kuchma.

On November 5–6, 1994 in Donetsk took place the fifth congress of GKU at which Bazyliuk was reelected as the party's leader. On April 22, 1995, after the reaction in Crimea and exile of Yuriy Meshkov to Moscow, in Simferopol took place the seventh congress of the Republican Party of Crimea, which adapted decision about self-liquidation and proposed its members to join the Civil Congress of Ukraine.

On March 16, 1996, GKU actively supported the creation of the Congress of Russian Organizations of Ukraine in Kyiv which was headed by Oleksandr Bazyliuk. The next day in Kyiv took place the sixth congress of GKU. On May 24, 1997, at the seventh congress of GKU Bazyliuk was reelected as the leader of GKU.

For the 1998 Ukrainian parliamentary elections the party along with the Ukrainian Party of Justice joined the Electoral bloc "Laborious Ukraine" (not to be confused with Serhiy Tihipko's parties Labour Ukraine or Labour Party Ukraine). The party list was headed by the General Ivan Herasymov. The elections were not successful for the "Laborious Ukraine" as it did not manage to obtain any seats in Verkhovna Rada.

=== Slavic Party ===
On April 26, 1998, in Donetsk took place the eighth congress where GKU was officially renamed as the Slavic Party.

On May 15, 1999, in Donetsk took place the ninth congress of Slavic Party, which nominated Oleksandr Bazyliuk as a candidate to President of Ukraine. At the 1999 presidential elections Bazyliuk place second to last.

It was a member of the Left Opposition, prior to it being banned in 2022.

On 22 October 2024, the Slavic Party was banned by the decision of the Eighth Administrative Court of Appeal.

== Results ==
Parliamentary since 1994 (year links to election page)
Year	Votes	%	Mandates	Notes
1994	72,473	0.30	2	
1998	813,326	3,06	0	Bloc "Laborious Ukraine"
2002	N/A	N/A	—	Bloc "For Yushchenko!"
2006	51,569	0.20	—	Bloc "FOR UNION"
2012	N/A	N/A	—	
