= Oleksandra Kuzhel =

Ukrainian politician (born 1953)

- Олександра Кужель
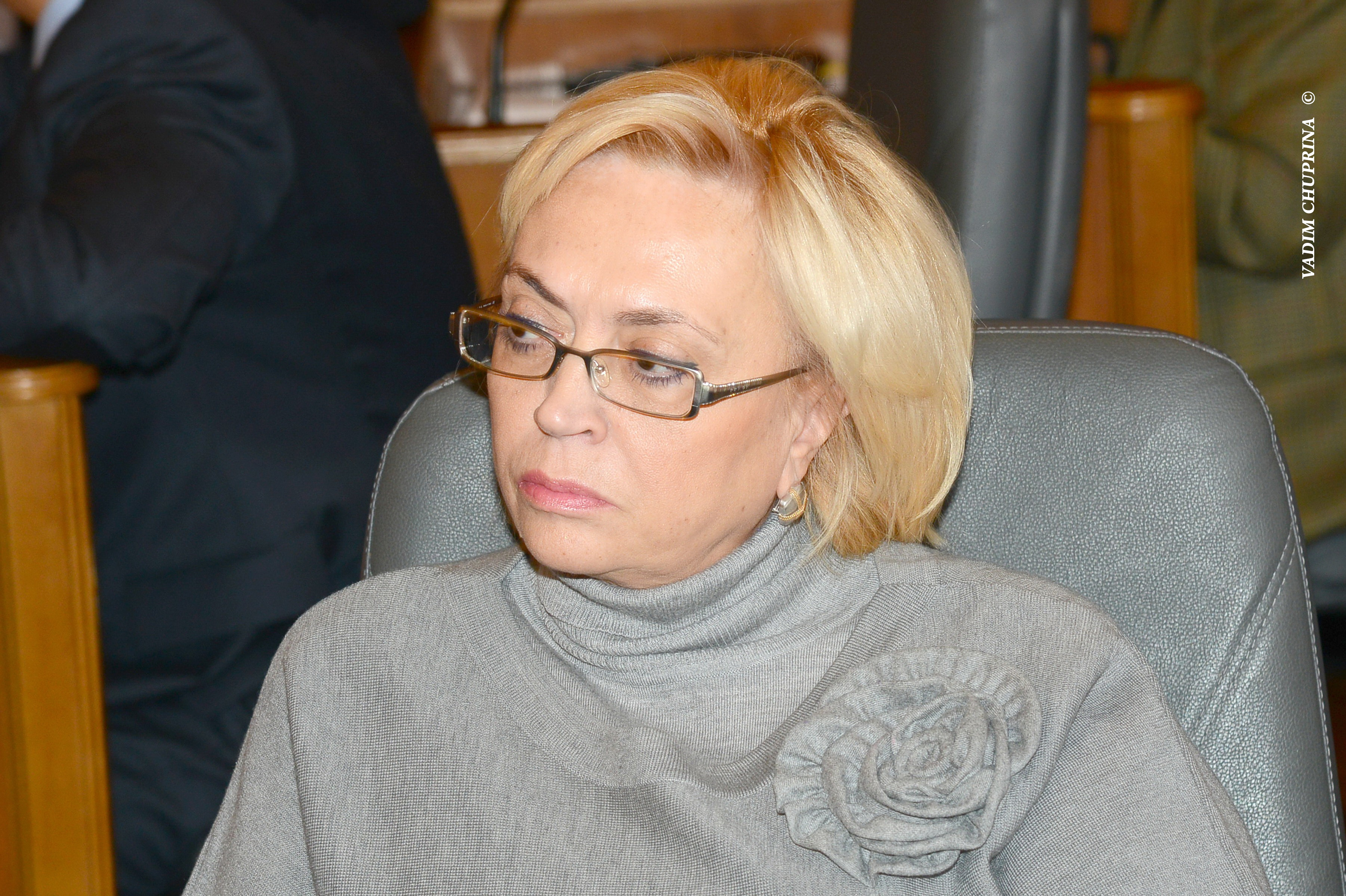
- Kuzhel in 2013

People's Deputy of Ukraine
- In office 12 December 2012 – 29 August 2019

Personal details
- Born: 4 July 1953 (age 72) Kostiantynivka, Ukrainian SSR, Soviet Union
- Party: Fatherland (2012–2019); Strong Ukraine (2010–2011); Labour Ukraine(2004–2009)

Oleksandra Volodymyrivna Kuzhel (Ukrainian: Олекса́ндра Володи́мирівна Ку́жель; born 4 July 1953) is a Ukrainian politician who served in various roles from 1994 to 2019. She was a People's Deputy of Ukraine as part of the Fatherland party from 2012 until 2019. A graduate of the National Metallurgical Academy of Ukraine, she studied at the Zaporizhia State Engineering Academy and received a PhD in Economics in 1983.

Her political career began after the 1994 parliamentary election when she was elected to the Verkovna Rada out of the Zaporizhia Oblast. In 1995, president Leonid Kuchma appointed Kuzhel to the National Audit Committee, where she served until her term expired in 1998. Kuzhel did not win re-election in 1998, but was appointed to the State Committee of Ukraine on Regulatory Policy and Entrepreneurship by Kuchma, a position she served in until 2003. She later held the same position from 2009 to 2010. In 2004, she campaigned for Victor Yanukovych's presidential run, and served as an advisor in the National Bank of Ukraine. Kuzhel was appointed as Deputy Minister of Regional Development and Construction of Ukraine in 2007, but resigned later that year after Yulia Tymoshenko became prime minister, succeeding Yanukovych.

In late 2011, the Strong Ukraine party chose to merge with the Party of Regions; Kuzhel resigned from the party in protest against the merger, and joined Fatherland party shortly afterwards. After joining Fatherland, she had planned to run as mayor of Kyiv, but after no election for mayor took place that year, she instead was elected as a People's Deputy to the Verkhovna Rada, winning a spot in 2012 and 2014.

On 5 November 2015, Kuzhel was attacked with a glass bottle in parliament by People's Front party deputy head Andriy Teteruk. The 62-year-old Kuzhel suffered a black eye and a concussion as a result of the attack. The Fatherland party threatened a boycott of parliament and demanded Teteruk's resignation; cooler heads prevailed and neither scenario ended up taking place.

Kuzhel was not re-elected in the 2019 Ukrainian parliamentary election.

Kuzhel was a candidate (number 4 on the election list) for the Kyiv City Council for Fatherland in the 2020 Kyiv local election of October 2020. Although she won a seat she did not take it.
