= Party of Labor (Ukraine) =

Party of Labor Партія праці
- Russian name: Партия Труда
- Leader: Valentyn Landyk
- Founded: December 21, 1992 (33 years ago)
- Dissolved: November 18, 2000 (25 years ago)
- Merged into: Party of Regional Revival of Ukraine
- Headquarters: Donetsk, Ukraine

Party of Labor (Ukrainian: Партія праці, Partiya Pratsi, abbreviated as PP (Ukrainian: ПП)) was a political party soon after the independence of Ukraine. The party laid the foundation for several other big parties later in time such as the Slavonic Party of Ukraine and the Party of Regions. The Party of Labor merged in 2000 into the Party of Regional Revival "Toiling Solidarity of Ukraine", better known as the Party of Regions.

== Historical background ==
A consultative meeting of several politicians from the Eastern Ukraine took place on March 21, 1992 in Kharkiv. At the meeting it was decided to create a new political force. On May 16, 1992 in Donetsk took place a constituent assembly the Civil Congress of Ukraine led by Mykola Azarov. The provisional co-chairmen of the congress were elected the leader of the Movement for Donbas Revival Oleksandr Bazilyuk, the leader of the Democratic Donbas Mykola Ragozin and the Ukrainian parliamentary Valeriy Meshcheryakov. To the provisional presidium were also included the chairman of Kharkiv department of the Movement of Democratic Reform Anatoliy Volchenko, the chairman of a public organization "Elections-89" Pavlo Khaimovich, the chairman of the Donbas Inter-movement Dmytro Kornilov, one of leader of the Civil Forum of Ukraine Oleksandr Luzan and the Otaman of Don Cossacks Vladyslav Karabulin.

On the initiative of Pavlo Khaimovich on October 3, 1992 took place the second congress in Donetsk where the Civil Congress of Ukraine was officially established. The co-chairmen of it were elected Oleksandr Bazilyuk, Valeriy Meshcheryakov and another Ukrainian parliamentary Volodymyr Tyeryekhov. During the congress was adopted a decision to create two political parties the Civil Union and Party of Labor.

On December 21, 1992 a constituent congress of the Party of Labor took place in Donetsk. The congress elected Valentyn Landyk the leader of the party, while Mykola Azarov became his deputy. By 1993 Landyk left the Party of Labor and until 1994 Azarov was an acting chairman of the party.

During the 1994 parliamentary elections four representatives of the party managed to obtain parliamentary mandates Azarov at 115th, Viktor Kocherha at 88th, Ivan Symonenko at 440th and Vadym Hurov at 90th. They were joined by Vyacheslav Tyutin who later also gain a mandate in the 74th electoral district.

The next parliamentary elections in 1998 were less successful for the Party of Labor that joined a two-party electoral bloc "Party of Labor - Liberal Party - TOGETHER". Changes in electoral system set a party threshold of 4% which the bloc was not able to overcome gaining only 1.89%. The elections at single constituencies were lost as well, thus the party received no representation in the Verkhovna Rada.

On July 18, 2000 the Party of Labor adopted decision on uniting with the Party of Regional Revival of Ukraine (today's Party of Regions), which on November 18, 2000 was successfully accomplished and the party merged with the Party of Regions.

Parliamentary since 1994 (year links to election page)
Year	Votes	%	Mandates	Notes
1994	114,409	0.40	4	later added one more
1998	502,969	1.89	0	together with Liberal Party of Ukraine
2002	0	N/A	-	merged with Party of Regions
