= Mykola Hrabar =

Ukrainian politician

- Микола Грабар

People's Deputy of Ukraine
- In office 12 May 1994 – 12 May 1998
- Constituency: Khust constituency no. 176

Personal details
- Born: 23 November 1962 (age 63) Khust, Ukrainian SSR, Soviet Union (now Khust, Ukraine)
- Party: Reforms and Order Party
- Education: Kyiv University

Mykola Fedorovych Grabar (Ukrainian: Микола Федорович Грабар; born 23 November 1962) was a self-nominated candidate in the 2004 Ukrainian presidential election. He was previously a People's Deputy of Ukraine in the Verkhovna Rada during its second convocation from 1994 to 1998.

== Early life ==
Grabar was born on 23 November 1962 in the city of Khust, which was then part of the Ukrainian SSR in the Soviet Union. His father Fyodor was a pensioner and his mother Maria was also.

In 1984, he graduated from Kyiv University with a specialist as a lawyer, and also later graduated from the Kyiv National Economic University to receive the specialization of economist. After graduating, he worked within the Leningrad District of Kyiv as an intern, assistant, then senior assistant to the Prosecutor of the Leningrad District. From 1990 to 1994 he then chaired the Kyiv City Council's Standing Commission on Law and Order and Combating Organized Crime, and also on its Mandate and Law-and-Order Commission. He was elected three times to the Kyiv City Council (1990–1994, 1994–1998, 1998–2002). He also founded the law firm "Kyiv-Khust" in 1998 after he became licensed as a lawyer of the Kyiv Bar.

== Political career ==
During the 1994 Ukrainian parliamentary election, he was elected to the Verkhovna Rada from Khust constituency no. 176, and upon joining the parliament he became part of the Bloc "Reforms". In parliament, he served as a member of the Committee on Law and Order, and his term expired in April 1998. Following this, he attempted to run again in 1998 and 2002, for the former as a Reforms and Order Party candidate and on the latter as a self-nominated candidate, but did not win either seat.

Candidate for President of Ukraine in the 2004 elections. If elected, he promised to double the income of Ukrainian citizens by 2006 and to return $20 billion that were taken out from Ukraine to the United States illegally. In the 1st round 19675 votes (0.07%), 12th place among 24 candidates.
