= Oleh Ishchenko =

Ukrainian politician

- Олег Іщенко
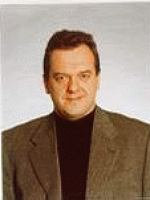
- Official portrait, 1998

People's Deputy of Ukraine
- In office 10 December 1995 – 14 May 2002
- Preceded by: Constituency established
- Succeeded by: Oleh Humeniuk
- Constituency: Chernivtsi Oblast, 1 May District (1995–1998); Ternopil Oblast, No. 165 (1998–2002)

Personal details
- Born: 10 October 1956 (age 69) Berezhany, Ukrainian SSR, Soviet Union
- Party: European Solidarity (2000–?)
- Other political affiliations: People's Movement of Ukraine (c. 1998–1999); Social Democratic Party of Ukraine (united) (1999–2000); Independent (until c. 1998)
- Education: Taras Shevchenko University of Kyiv

Oleh Ivanovych Ishchenko (Ukrainian: Олег Іванович Іщенко; born 10 October 1956) is a Ukrainian politician who was a People's Deputy of Ukraine from 1995 to 2002, representing the city of Chernivtsi's 1 May District from 1995 to 1998 and Ukraine's 165th electoral district in Ternopil Oblast from 1998 to 2002.

== Biography ==
Oleh Ivanovych Ishchenko was born 10 October 1956 in the city of Berezhany, in western Ukraine, to an ethnically Ukrainian family. He studied at Taras Shevchenko University of Kyiv, graduating from the law faculty in 1978, and he worked as a lawyer in the city of Chernihiv from 1978 to 1991 before serving as director of several companies.

Ishchenko was first elected to the Verkhovna Rada (Ukrainian parliament) in the 1994 Ukrainian parliamentary election for the city of Chernivtsi's 1 May District. At the time of his election, he was an independent and chairman of the board at a company known as the Russian-Ukrainian Petroleum Society.

During the 1998 Ukrainian parliamentary election Ishchenko was re-elected to the Verkhovna Rada, this time representing the newly-established 165th electoral district in Ternopil Oblast. At the time, he was a member of the People's Movement of Ukraine (abbreviated Rukh). He was involved in Rukh's 1999 split, after party leader Viacheslav Chornovil described him as a "gas oil shark" and claimed that he had bribed the faction of Rukh opposed to Chornovil with one million dollars to remove him from office. He left Rukh in October of the same year to join the Social Democratic Party of Ukraine (united), which he was part of until July 2000, when he joined Petro Poroshenko's Solidarity faction. He was a member of the Finance and Banking Activities Committee.

Ishchenko did not run in the 2002 Ukrainian parliamentary election.
