= Ukrainian Beer Lovers Party =

Short-lived political party in Ukraine

Ukrainian Beer Lovers Party, UBLP (Ukrainian: Українська Партія Шанувальників Пива (УПШП), romanized: Ukrainska Partiia Shanuvalnykiv Pyva (UPShP)) was a short-lived political party in Ukraine. It was established on November 10th, 1991 by Volodymyr Yermakov, Petro Serhiyenko, and Pavlo Tarnovsky. The inauguration was on April 4th, 1992, and the party was registered on August 8th, 1992.

It is not associated with another Russophone organization, Ukrainian Beer Lovers Party, UBLP (Russian: Партия любителей пива, Ukrainian: Українська партія любителiв пива, romanized: Ukrainska partiia liubyteliv pyva, УПЛП), which was not officially registered.

The party broadly aligned itself with liberal-democratic positions, and advocated for a cosmopolitan society on with foundational values of respect for private property, free market economics, and universal human rights. The party advocated for the formation of a civilized, respectable, gentlemanly elite class of beer drinker.

The party participated in the 1994 Parliamentary Election. In a pre-election survey, UBLP was supported by 3% of population. In the election, the UBLP secured only 1806 (<0.01%) votes and was awarded no parliamentary seats.

In 1996, the party claimed to enlist 1,599 members.

In 1997, UBLP joined the bloc "Free Democrats" (Свободные демократы), which included the Liberal Democratic Party of Ukraine and Party of Free Peasants of Ukraine (Партія вільних селян, Partiia vilnykh selian).

In 2000, the UBLP changed its name from Ukrainian Beer Lovers Party to Party for Support of the Domestic Goods Producer (Партія Підтримки Вітчизняного Товаровиробника, Partiia Pidtrymky Vitchyznianoho Tovarovyrobnyka), adopting a more conventional platform and de facto ceasing its existence as a frivolous political party. On January 21st, 2001, the party was merged into the democratic union Ukrainian Righteousness (Українська Правиця, Ukrainska Pravytsia), headed by the Ukrainian People's Party.

== Party goals ==
The party platform advocated for:

- Establishment of a rule-of-law state in accordance with international standards
- Creation of a new economy and new economic relationship between people with free market standards
- Awakening and development of the people's dignity through cultural education; establishment of a cosmopolitan, gentlemanly class of beer drinker
- Expansion and improvement of the agrarian sector and the production of food products, including beer

== See also ==
- Polish Beer-Lovers' Party
