= Valentyn Landyk =

Ukrainian politician (born 1946)

- Валентин Ландик
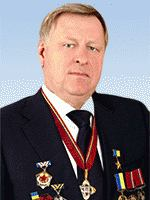
- Official portrait from 2012.

People's Deputy of Ukraine
- In office 11 May 1994 – 12 May 1998
- In office 31 March 2002 – 27 November 2014

Vice Prime Minister of Ukraine (Note: His official designation was in the area of issues of foreign economic activity and investments.)
- In office June 1993 – April 1994
- President: Leonid Kravchuk
- Prime Minister: Leonid Kuchma

Personal details
- Born: Valentyn Ivanovich Landyk; 22 November 1946 (age 79) Chasiv Yar, Ukrainian SSR, Soviet Union (now Ukraine)
- Party: Party of Labor; For United Ukraine! Party of Regions
- Education: Donbas State Machine-Building Academy; Institute of Industrial Economics of the National Academy of Sciences of Ukraine

Valentyn Ivanovich Landyk (Ukrainian: Валентин Ландик; born 22 November 1946) is a Ukrainian politician, oligarch, and businessman who served as a People's Deputy of Ukraine in the Verkhovna Rada from 1994 to 1998 and from 2002 to 2014. Landyk was also the founder and former leader of the Party of Labor and co-founder of the Party of Regions. As a businessman, he was the longtime leader of the NORD Group, a manufacturer in household appliances, including refrigerators.

== Early life ==
Landyk was born on 22 November 1946 in the city of Chasiv Yar, which was then part of the Ukrainian SSR in the Soviet Union. He is ethnically Ukrainian. He has one brother, Volodymyr, who was also a People's Deputy of Ukraine, but in Luhansk Oblast. After graduating from secondary school, Landyyk decided to pursue higher education, attending the Donbas State Machine-Building Academy in Kramatorsk within the Faculty of Metallurgy. He graduated with a specialty in mechanical engineering in 1969. After his graduation, he started working at the Shterovsky Hardware Plant in Miusynsk, initially as a design engineer and then later as a senior process engineer until May 1970. He left the company in May to complete his mandatory military service in the Soviet Army, where he served in military unit 03192 within the Leningrad Military District in Russia. After returning to Ukraine in 1971, he worked as a foreman at Chain Shop No. 1 at the machine-building plant "Victory of Labour" in Artemivsk. Up until 1982, he continued working there, steadily rising through the ranks to a senior process engineer, deputy head of a chain shop, head of chain shop no. 4, and head of chain shop no. 3. He was eventually promoted in May 1982 to Secretary of the Party Committee at the plant in Artemivsk, which he did up until 1985. In 1985, Landyk finally left Artemivsk, becoming Director of the Donetsk Food Machinery Plant until September 1987.

Later on in 1997, he achieved the degree of Candidate of Technical Sciences, and was given the certification of associate professor in 1999. In 2003, he became a Doctor of Economic Sciences.

== Business career and NORD ==
NORD's factory headquarters in Donetsk in 2013.

An example of NORD's refrigerators, including the old "Donbass" (Донбасс) line and premium "Swizer" line in 2013.

In 1987, Landyk was appointed to head "Elektropobutmash", a manufacturer of large household appliances (mostly refrigerators trademarked under the name "Donbass"), which was based in Donetsk. In connection with his longtime leadership of the company and later entry into politics, he is often called part of the generation of "red directors". After taking over the company, he began modernising it, replacing a number of items in the refrigerator lines. He also became friends with Mykola Yankovsky, another oligarch and the former owner of the Stirol plant in Horlivka, and joined the Club of Soviet Directors after perestroika. The Donbass refrigerators also began to be exported outside of the USSR to Western countries like France and Italy, through Metro and Carrefour, although this made little profit. In order to promote the brand in these countries, he changed the name based off a Swedish recommendation from Elektropobutmash to NORD. After the collapse of the Soviet Union, NORD was privatised in 1992, and Landyk began buying out shares of enterprises that were previously subcontractors to NORD, including Potentsial (Kyiv Oblast), Elektrodvyhun (Krasnoarmiisk/Pokrovsk), Kondytsioner (Kramatorsk), and NII BytMash to consolidate the company. NORD also had a contract with FATA, an Italian company owned by Danieli, by which NORD sold refrigerators for equipment. During the early 1990s, he also built a plant in Amman, Jordan, to market NORD's product line to Iraq. Landyk retained control of the company even when entering politics, opening up the Kyiv regional branch of NORD in 1997 and buying out the Ivita factory in Ivano-Frankivsk, although the latter ended in failure, with Landyk selling the factory off to Italian manufacturer Antonio Merloni in 2003. In 2001, he reconstructed the Donetsk plant for $15 million for ozone-safe materials so that the company could better export to Europe. That same year, he opened up a gas and electric appliance plant as part of NORD in Donetsk, which cost $50 million through Prominvestbank loans.

Three years later, in 2004, he also constructed a dishwasher line and a new shop to create appliances with about 70% planned for export. However, he was critical of what he said were "cheap Chinese goods" and smuggling, causing a drop in sales, which he voiced to Yulia Tymoshenko during her tour of NORD in August 2005. By 2006, Valentyn held 75.3% of NORD's shares, his son Andriy held 12.4%, and the rest of the workforce held 12.3%. He was only able to get the stopping of foreign products in 2007, when duties were placed on Chinese and Turkish refrigerators to help improve domestic business. In April 2008, he planned to open a new refrigerator plant in Rostov Oblast in Russia through another loan with Prominvestbank, which was built in 2009 with Diorit. By 2010, some of the marketed refrigerators to Russia started to sell (a premium brand "Swizer" and the older Soviet "ZiL"), although ZiL's sales in Russia were far below what was expected to be brought in. Landyk also began making and marketing Italian Zanussi brand stoves in 2013.

In February 2013, it was announced that Andriy would become head of the management board at NORD after being vice-president, although Valentyn was still president of NORD. In July 2016, it was announced that NORD would halt its production in Donetsk and mothball the assets there due to a loss after the DPR took over, while the company was moved to Kramatorsk and several of its plants were liquidated or leased. Due to these difficulties, on 13 September 2016, Landyk sold his nearly 80% share in NORD to Igor Sidorkin, the owner of the Russian-based company Diorit-Technis, which was NORD's previously exclusive distributor in Russia. However, after NORD announced they would move their production to China, Landyk regained his shares in NORD on 23 January 2018.

== Political career ==
=== 1990s and leadership of the Party of Labor ===
Landyk's official portrait as a deputy from 1994.

On 21 December 1992, Landyk formally entered politics when he was elected chairman of the Party of Labor during its congress in Donetsk after it was split from the Civil Congress of Ukraine. However, he stepped down from the post temporarily in June 1993, when he was appointed one of the Vice Prime Minister of Ukraine by Leonid Kuchma as part of the Kuchma government, specifically with the specialisation in the portfolio of foreign economic activity and investments. At the same time, he took on the posts of Chairman of the Agency for International Cooperation and Investment and Chairman of the Interdepartmental Committee of Ukraine on the European Union. Ultimately, he left most of these roles, except for retaining leadership of the Party of Labor when he ran in the 1994 Ukrainian parliamentary election during its 2nd convocation. He was then successfully elected from the constituency of No. 114, which represented the Leninskyi District of Donetsk. In the Rada, he was technically a member of the "Independents" group, and also sat as Chair of the Subcommittee on Foreign Economics and as Deputy Chair of the Committee on Foreign Affairs. In 1996, Landyk joined the organisation "Donbass Fellowship", which was established in Moscow and worked on ties between Donetsk and Russia, with many members from the Donetsk Clan joining it, including Landyk. In 1998, he ultimately did not run for reelection and instead left national politics while retaining the chairmanship of the Party of Labour.

=== Early 2000s and Party of Regions ===
On 18 July 2000, Landyk announced that the Party of Labor, which he was still leading, would merge to form the Party of Regional Revival of Ukraine "Labor Solidarity of Ukraine". This was eventually accomplished on 17 November 2000 in a party congress, where the Party of Regional Revival of Ukraine was formed through the merger of the Party of Labor, For Beautiful Ukraine, All-Ukrainian Party of Pensioners, Party of Regional Revival of Ukraine, and the Party of Ukraine's Solidarity. With the creation of the party, Landyk became one of three co-chairmen of it, alongside Petro Poroshenko and Volodymyr Rybak. At the next congress of the party on 3 March 2001, the party's name was changed to the Party of Regions, while Landyk became Deputy Chair of the Party of Regions.

As a member of the For United Ukraine! electoral bloc (which included the Party of Regions), Landyk decided to run in the Verkhovna Rada again in April 2002 during the 2002 Ukrainian parliamentary elections. He ran in constituency No. 44 (Donetsk Oblast), and won 46.61% of the vote. Landyk would then remain in parliament for over a decade, representing the Party of Regions until the 7th convocation's premature end, running twice on the party list of Party of Regions list as No. 18 in the 5th and 6th convocations, and again in a constituency in the 7th convocation, but for district No. 43. In 2003, during the 2003 Tuzla Island conflict when Russia built a causeway on Tuzla Island in Crimea, Landyk said in a press conference that the conflict was artificially inflated for the upcoming election season and purely political. Instead, he blamed the Ukrainian side for attempting to make it more of an issue, but said that Russia also had to take some of the blame. Landyk remained a consistent advocate for an economic union, but he supported Leonid Kuchma and relations with Russia over the European Union. Landyk was also a harsh critic of the banking system in Ukraine in the early 2000s, calling the National Bank of Ukraine a brake on the country's development because of very high interest rates.

=== Late 2000s ===
In February 2005, Landyk was dismissed as an adviser to the prime minister, who was then Viktor Yanukovych, whom he had been serving as on a voluntary basis since March 2003. In October 2005, it was found that Landyk was among five district deputies from Donetsk, where none of his bills had become law. Landyk, two years later, even said that he disliked politics, especially voting and winning through a party list, which seemed wrong, but he ran regardless. That same year, he was criticised by then Prime Minister Yulia Tymoshenko for continuing to lead NORD even while serving as a deputy, and she accused this practice of violating the Constitution of Ukraine. The following year, in 2008, Landyk joined the "Donbass against NATO" march in 2008 alongside Anatoliy Blyznyuk in response to the 2008 Bucharest NATO summit, which Ukraine participated in.

=== Early 2010s and Euromaidan ===
Landyk (left) with Oleg Belyaev during Victory Day celebrations in Donetsk in 2012.

Landyk during Metallurgist's Day celebrations in Donetsk in 2012.

In his campaign promises for the 2012 parliamentary elections, Landyk said that he would focus on the education system, ecological well-being, and "Euro-integration development". Shortly after taking office in the 7th convocation, he voted in favour of the On the Principles of State Language Policy, which expanded the designation of regional languages, most notably Russian. That same year, he gave an extensive interview to Ukrainska Pravda in which he called himself a "communo-socialist director" and said that he did not care about the "red director" title. He also called the persecution of Yulia Tymoshenko correct and blamed her for gas prices, called for a fully majoritarian parliamentary election with no electoral lists, and said he did not care about the issue of button pushing. In terms of foreign policy, he said he was for the Customs Union because it was closer to Ukraine, and said that only once Ukrainian technology was improved could even entering the European Union be discussed. However, just a year later, he urged postponing Ukraine's membership in the Customs Union, citing the problems NORD would face if it joined it.

In November 2013, when association agreements with the European Union were being discussed, he urged Yanukovych in a meeting to delay the European Union–Ukraine Association Agreement so that "firms could prepare" and that signing would limit Ukraine's participation in the Customs Union. This was particularly controversial, as other industrialists rejected Landyk's opinion, including Anatoliy Kinakh, who said businesses wanted Europe. Despite this, Landyk still held firm and held a rally at his workshop at NORD on 17 December 2013, together with Yanukovych, and said that the company would back Yanukovych and that trade with Russia should be restored. Yanukovych ultimately did not sign the association agreement, starting Euromaidan protests nationwide, with Landyk voting not to condemn the violence used against protesters, and he did not object to or comment when pro-Russian separatists subsequently created the Donetsk People's Republic. When snap elections were declared after the 7th convocation was prematurely ended, Landyk did not run for parliament again.

== Personal life ==
He is married to Nelly Volodymyrivna, a housewife. They have two children: Natalia, born in 1973, and Andriy, born in 1980. Both work as entrepreneurs. As of 2006, Andriy was also the Deputy General Director of NORD and its department for Procurement and Sales. Valentyn also served as President of the Table Tennis Federation of Ukraine from 1997 to 2018.

== Honours and awards ==
Landyk was awarded the following honours. In December 2007, it was also announced that a street would be named after Landyk in Donetsk, called Landika Street in the Petrovsky district. However, on 22 November 2024, in accordance with Presidential Decree No. 779, all of his awards were revoked by President Volodymyr Zelenskyy as a person under sanctions by Ukraine.

- Order of Merit, III degree (1999)
- Order "Glory for Loyalty to the Fatherland", 3rd class (1999)
- Order "For Labour Achievements", 4th class (2000)
- Order of Merit, II degree (July 2002)
- State Prize of Ukraine in Science and Technology (2003)
- Honorary Citizen of Donetsk (2006)
- Hero of Ukraine (Order of the State class as a civilian, 2006)
- Order of Merit, I degree (August 2011)

== Sources ==
- Казанський, Денис (2020). Як Україна втрачала Донбас [How Ukraine Lost the Donbas]. Книжкове видавництво Чорна гора.

Party political offices
Preceded by office created	Leader of the Party of Labor; 1992–2000	Succeeded by party merged
