= Serhii Dovhan =

- Сергій Довгань
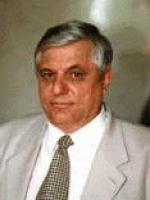
- Official portrait, 1998

First Deputy Minister of Agrarian Policy in liaison with the Verkhovna Rada
- In office 11 October 2004 – 22 February 2005

Governor of Kherson Oblast
- In office 5 July 2004 – 11 October 2004
- Preceded by: Anatoliy Yurchenko
- Succeeded by: Volodymyr Khodakovsky

First Deputy Minister of Environmental Protection in liaison with the Verkhovna Rada
- In office 26 November 2003 – 5 July 2004

Member of the Verkhovna Rada
- In office 11 May 1994 – 14 May 2002

Personal details
- Born: Serhii Vasylovych Dovhan; 6 March 1952 (age 74) Tokarivka, Ukrainian SSR, Soviet Union (now Ukraine)

Serhii Vasylovych Dovhan (Ukrainian: Сергій Васильович Довгань; born on 6 March 1952), is a Ukrainian politician who last served as the First Deputy Minister of Agrarian Policy from 2004 to 2005.

He was also the Governor of Kherson Oblast in 2004.

He had been the First Deputy Minister of Environmental Protection from 2003 to 2004.

He also served as a member of the Verkhovna Rada from 1994 to 2002.

He is a doctor of Agricultural Sciences as of 2010.

== Biography ==
Serhii Dovhan was born on 6 March 1952 in Tokarivka, Bilozersky district, Kherson Oblast to a peasant family, and is an ethnic Ukrainian.

From 1966 to 1969, he is a worker at the state farm "Rassvet" of Bilozersky district.

In 1969, he entered as a student of the Kherson Agricultural Institute. In 1974, after he graduated as an agronomist, he has been a seed agronomist of the state farm "40 years of October" of the Berislav district. The same year in November, he has been the chief agronomist of the Dnipro state farm in the Beryslav district.

In January 1978, he has been the director of the state farm "Zernovy".

Between 1982 and 1995, he has been the director of state farm "Kosmos" of Beryslav district, Kherson Oblast.

In April 1994, Dovhan was elected as a member of parliament, People's Deputy of Ukraine of the 2nd convocation of the Verkhovna Rada, representing the Velikoy Oleksandrivskyi electoral district No. 400, in Kherson Oblast. He took office on 11 May.

He was a member of the Constitutional Commission from November 1994 to 1996, in which he became a member of the Finance and Banking Committee. He is also a member of an authorized party of the SPU and Peasant Party of Ukraine fraction. Prior to that, he was the head of the SelPU faction.

He also has a candidate's thesis "Technological and ecological support for the formation of balanced agrophytocenes of alfalfa seed crops in the conditions of the southern steppe of Ukraine", for which he obtained in 1995.

He was re-elected as a member of the Verhkovna Rada in March 1998 to the 3rd convocation in March 1998, this time from the SPU-SelPU, No. 2 on the list. He is a member of the Finance and Banking Committee for the second time. He had been a member of the SPU and SelPU factions from May to October 1999, a leader of the SelPU faction from October 1998 to February 2000, in which he is an authorized representative of the Solidarity group until November for the same year. He left parliament in on 14 May 2002.

On 26 November 2003, Dohvan became the First Deputy Minister of Environmental Protection in liaison with the Verkhovna Rada.

On 5 July 2004, he became the Governor of Kherson Oblast.

On 11 October 2004, he became the First Deputy Minister of Agrarian Policy in liaison with the Verkhovna Rada. On 22 February 2005, he was dismissed as first deputy minister by President Viktor Yushchenko.

In April 2010, he is a Doctor of Agricultural Sciences, and has a doctoral dissertation "Agroecological substantiation of the forecast of the reproduction of harmful insect species in different soil and climatic zones of Ukraine".

== Family ==
He is married, and has two sons and two grandchildren, Mariya and Tymur.
