= Heorhiy Mozer =

Ukrainian politician (1940–2024)

- Георгій Мозер

People's Deputy of Ukraine
- In office 11 May 1994 – 12 May 1998

Personal details
- Born: Heorhiy Eduardovych Mozer; 5 August 1940 North Kazakhstan Region, Kazakh SSR, USSR
- Died: 4 November 2024 (aged 84)
- Party: KPU
- Education: Kyiv National University of Technologies and Design
- Occupation: Engineer

Heorhiy Eduardovych Mozer (Ukrainian: Георгій Едуардович Мозер; 5 August 1940 – 4 November 2024) was a Ukrainian-German engineer and politician. A member of the Communist Party of Ukraine, he served in the Verkhovna Rada from 1994 to 1998.

Mozer died on 4 November 2024, at the age of 84.
