= Valeriy Babych =

Ukrainian politician (1953–2020)

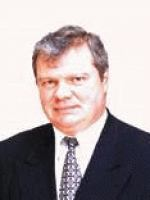
Babych in 1998

Valeriy Heorhiiovych Babych (25 August 1953 – 29 October 2020) was a Ukrainian politician, economist and businessman who served as a member of the Verkhovna Rada from 1994 to 2002.

== Biography ==
Babych was born in Brody, Lviv Oblast, and studied in Kyiv. After graduation, he worked at the Academy of Sciences of Ukraine, youth organizations, the State Plan of Ukraine, the Council of Ministers of the Ukrainian SSR.

In 1990, he founded and headed the company "Inter-Invest", and in 1991 he was elected Chairman of the Board of RAO "Ukrainian Exchange". The following year, after the reorganization of RAO "Ukrainian Exchange" into JSC "Ukrainian Financial Group", he was elected as its president. In 1993-1994 he served as adviser to the President of Ukraine Leonid Kravchuk on market economy issues, and the 1994 and 1998 Ukrainian parliamentary election he was elected to the Ukrainian parliament.

Babych founded and headed the activities of many public organizations that supported democratic transformations and market reforms in Ukraine and the Commonwealth of Independent States. In particular, in 1991 he was elected President of the Congress of Stock Exchanges of the USSR; in independent Ukraine in the following years he was elected head of the Congress of Business Circles of Ukraine, the Eastern European Association of Entrepreneurs, and the All-Ukrainian Association of Entrepreneurs.

From 1998 to 2003, he was chairman of the political party "All-Ukrainian Union "Cherkashchany"". In 2002 he was re-elected as President of JSC "Ukrainian Financial Group", in 2004 he was elected Chairman of the Board of the Ukrainian Financial Group, and in 2006 he headed the Ukrainian Financial Group Corporation.

Babych was among the organizers of the Ukrainian Union of Industrialists and Entrepreneurs, and was repeatedly elected to the governing bodies of the USPP. He was elected chairman of the Federation of Friendship Societies of Ukraine with foreign countries, president of the Ukrainian International Christian Charitable Foundation, and vice-president of the Ukrainian International Foundation Taras Shevchenko. He conducted extensive charitable activities and provided patronage and sponsorship to many initiatives in science, education, culture, art, literature, and sports.

Babych died from COVID-19 at a hospital in Kyiv, Ukraine, on 29 October 2020, aged 67, during the COVID-19 pandemic in Ukraine.
