= Petro Didyk (footballer) =

Ukrainian footballer (1960–2015)

Personal information
- Full name: Petro Mykolayovych Didyk
- Date of birth: 14 July 1960
- Place of birth: Boratyn, Rivne Oblast, Ukrainian SSR
- Date of death: 1 May 2015 (aged 54)
- Place of death: Zalishchyky, Ternopil Oblast, Ukraine
- Position: Defender

Youth career
- Trudovi Rezervy Lviv

Senior career*
Years	Team	Apps	(Gls)
1977	Karpaty Lviv	0	(0)
1978	FC Sokil Lviv (amateur)	?	(?)
1978–1984	FC Nyva Berezhany		
1985–1988	FC Dnister Zalishchyky		
1989	FC Krystal Chortkiv		
1991	FC Halychyna Drohobych	28	(0)
1991	FC Dnister Zalishchyky		
1991	Stal Sanok		
1992	FC Dnister Zalishchyky	28	(6)
1993–1994	FC Krystal Chortkiv	36	(2)
1994	FC Dnister Zalishchyky	15	(0)
1994–1996	FC Krystal Chortkiv	71	(9)
1997	Irtysh Pavlodar	23	(2)
1998	FC Krystal Chortkiv	7	(0)
1999–2000	FC Tobol	42	(1)
- * Club domestic league appearances and goals

Petro Didyk (Ukrainian: Петро Миколайович Дідик; 14 July 1960 – 1 May 2015) was a Ukrainian football defender and football functionary.

== Career ==
Didyk played in the clubs of different levels in the Western Ukraine. Also he played in Poland and Kazakhstan. After retiring from playing career in age 40, he became football functionary in the Ternopil Regional Football Federation.

He died in a hospital on 1 May 2015, from injuries sustained in a traffic collision.

== Honours ==
- Kazakhstan Premier League: 1997
