= Skorodne =

- Village
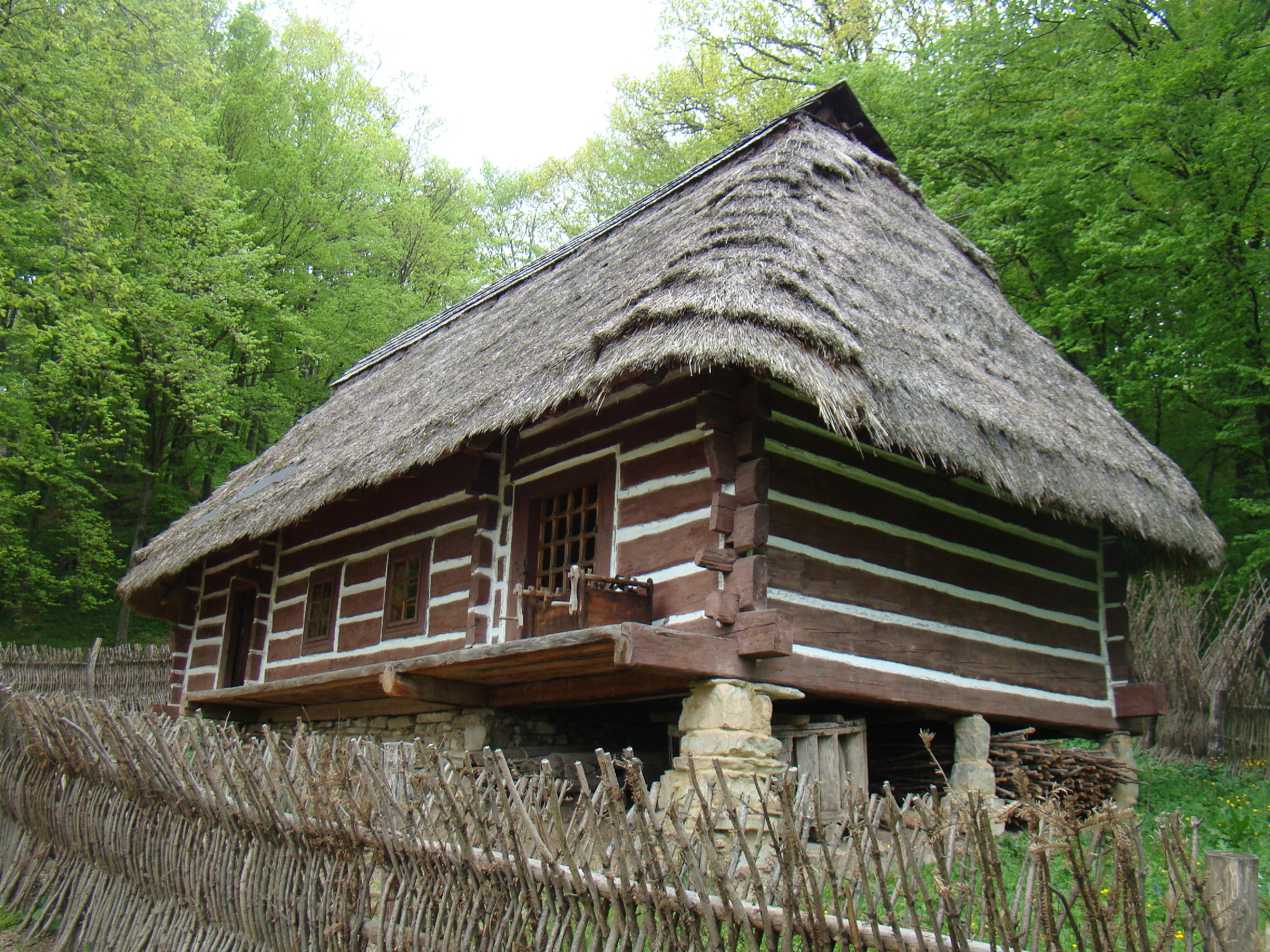
- Original dwelling from Skorodne in the museum in Sanok

- Location within Poland
- Coordinates: 49°16′27″N 22°38′8″E
- Country: Poland
- Voivodeship: Subcarpathian
- County: Bieszczady
- Gmina: Lutowiska
- Population: 47

Skorodne [skɔˈrɔdnɛ] is a village in the administrative district of Gmina Lutowiska, within Bieszczady County, Subcarpathian Voivodeship, in south-eastern Poland, close to the border with Ukraine.
