= Volodymyr Butkevych =

Ukrainian scholar and human rights lawyer

- Володимир Буткевич
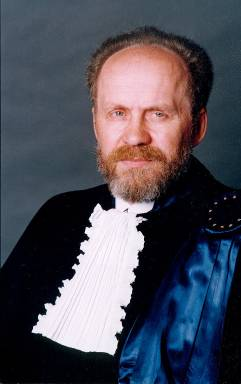

Member of the Verkhovna Rada

2nd convocation
- In office 1994–1998
- Constituency: Pohrebyshche

Personal details
- Born: August 2, 1946 (age 78); Kantelyna, Illintsi Raion, Vinnitsa Oblast, Ukrainian SSR, Soviet Union

Volodymyr Hryhorovych Butkevych (Boutkevich) (Ukrainian: Володимир Григорович Буткевич; born August 2, 1946) is a Ukrainian scholar and human rights lawyer. From 1996 until 2008 he was the Ukrainian judge at the European Court of Human Rights.

In 1994 he was a head of a provisional committee of the Verkhovna Rada to settle Crimean issues.
