= Liberal Party of Ukraine =

Liberal Party of Ukraine Ліберальна партія України
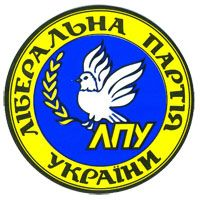
- Head: Mykhailo Opanashchenko
- Founded: September 12, 1991
- Ideology: Liberalism; Social liberalism
- National affiliation: Party of Labor and Liberal Party – TOGETHER, Our Ukraine–People's Self-Defense Bloc
- Colours: golden - yellow

Website
- www.lpu.org.ua

The Liberal Party of Ukraine (Ukrainian: Ліберальна партія України, romanized: Liberalna Partiya Ukrayiny, or LPU) is a modern Ukrainian political party. It was founded on September 12, 1991 in Donetsk. The official date of registration is 10.10.1991, the Ministry of Justice of Ukraine certificate number is 132.

Main liberal principles are based on world's liberal traditions: precedence of law, political and economic freedoms, government and national idea. Today The Liberal Party of Ukraine has 32 thousands of members, 432 local and district centers in all regions of Ukraine, Crimea, cities of Kyiv and Sevastopol.

The aim of the party promote and disseminate ideas and principles of liberalism in Ukraine, implement liberal and democratic reforms. Traditional values of Ukrainian liberalism are labor, truth and freedom.

The Liberal Party of Ukraine is the first liberal party of former Soviet countries recognized by Liberal International as one that meets international criteria of political liberalism. LPU is officially accepted into the ranks of LI in the status of observer member on November 23, 1997 at 48th Congress of Liberal International held in Oxford (Great Britain).

== Party Congress ==
Founding Congress – September 12, 1991 – Donetsk

І Congress – June 3, 1993 року - Kyiv

ІІ Congress – January 28, 1995 року – Kyiv

ІІІ Congress – 1 phase – January 26, 1996 року - Kyiv

ІІІ Congress – 2 phase - April 28, 1996 року - Kyiv

IV Congress – October 25, 1997 - Kyiv

V Congress – December 19, 1998 року - Kyiv

VI Congress – May 15, 1999 року – Kyiv

VII Congress – December 7, 2001 року – Kyiv

VIII Congress – March 19, 2004 року - Kyiv

IX Congress – July 4, 2004 року – Kyiv

X Congress – June 25, 2005 року – Kyiv

XI Congress – November 5, 2005 року – Kyiv

XII Congress – І етап - December 17, 2005 року – Kyiv

XII Congress – ІІ етап – December 22, 2005 року – Kyiv

XIII Congress – August 4, 2007 року – Kyiv

XIV Congress – November 1, 2009 року – Kyiv

== History of the Party ==
Party was formed on Founding Congress of September 12, 1991. I.R. Markulov was selected as the first Head of the LPU.

In summer 1993 Liberal Party became all-Ukrainian. The first Congress in Kyiv adopted the program based on values of social liberalism.

In January 1995 the second Congress of LPU was held, that choose O.I. Soskin as the Head. At that time The Verkhovna Rada of Ukraine was forming the liberal parliamentary fraction "Socio-market choice". LPU took strong centrist stand.

The third Congress of LPU (January–April, 1996) approved new edition of party program and its new Charter. The Congress elected Volodymyr Shcherban as the Head of Liberal Party of Ukraine.

In 1997, the LPU actively enters the international scene for the first time, becomes a full member of international liberal movement and joins the Liberal International on the Congress in Oxford.

In 1998 it takes stand in elections to the Verkhovna Rada of Ukraine in the bloc "Party of Labor and Liberal Party – Together!" Bloc does not overcome 4% electoral threshold and do not get to the Verkhovna Rada.

In 1999 the Liberal Party of Ukraine supported the candidate for President of Ukraine – Leonid Kuchma.

In 2002 it took stand in parliamentary and local elections as a member of electoral bloc of Viktor Yushchenko "Our Ukraine". In result of elections two members of LPU entered the Verkhovna Rada. Two liberals chaired regional councils and one member became a mayor, 600 members of LPU became members of regional, district in cities, village and town councils.

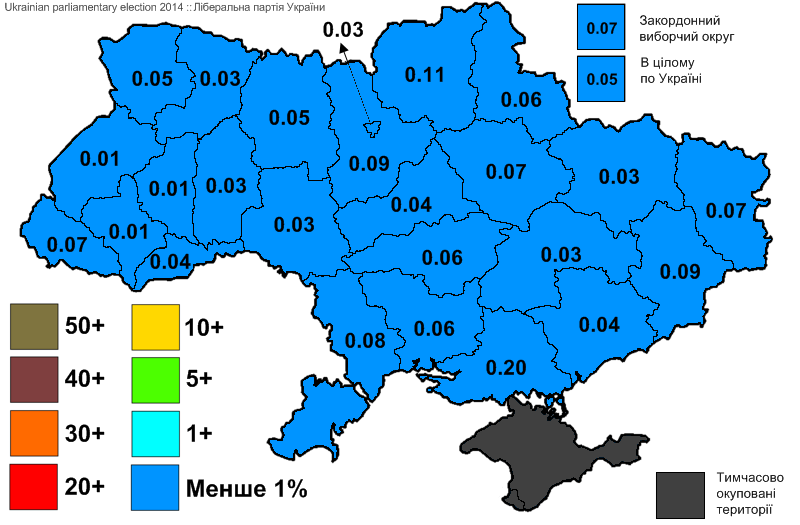
Results of the 2014 parliamentary elections for Liberal Party

On the eve of president elections in 2004, under the pressure of the Head V.P. Shcherban, The Liberal Party of Ukraine decided to withdraw from the Our Ukraine bloc and join the coalition that supported presidential candidate V.F. Yanukovich.

On June 4, 2005, LPU political council accepted the resignation of V.P. Scherban from post of the Chairman of the Liberty Party of Ukraine. On June 25, 2005 the new Head - P.S. Tsyganka was elected. The new composition of the Political Council and Head of the Party was selected.

In 2006 The Liberal Party of Ukraine took stand in the parliamentary elections independently and failed to overcome the electoral threshold.

LPU refused to participate in early parliamentary elections in 2007 because of reasonably disbelief in the honesty and transparency of their implementation.

In 2010 the Liberal Party nominated its candidate for President of Ukraine, the first head of LPU I.Markulov, which, however, was not registered by the CEC for technical reasons.

In the 2012 Ukrainian parliamentary election the party won 0.07% of the national votes and no constituencies (it had competed in 3 constituencies) and thus failed to win parliamentary representation.

In the 2014 Ukrainian parliamentary election the party again failed to win parliamentary representation since it now won 0.05% of the national votes and again no constituencies (it had competed in 38 constituencies).

In the 2019 Ukrainian parliamentary election the party is again competing in constituencies. One of the candidates the party put forward is, former head of the Presidential Administration of Ukraine during the presidency of Viktor Yanukovych, Andriy Klyuyev.

== See also ==
- Liberalism
- Contributions to liberal theory
- Liberalism worldwide
- List of liberal parties
- Liberal democracy
- Liberalism in Ukraine
