= Vladyslav Nosov =

Ukrainian politician, lawyer, and civil servant (born 1946)

- Владислав Носов
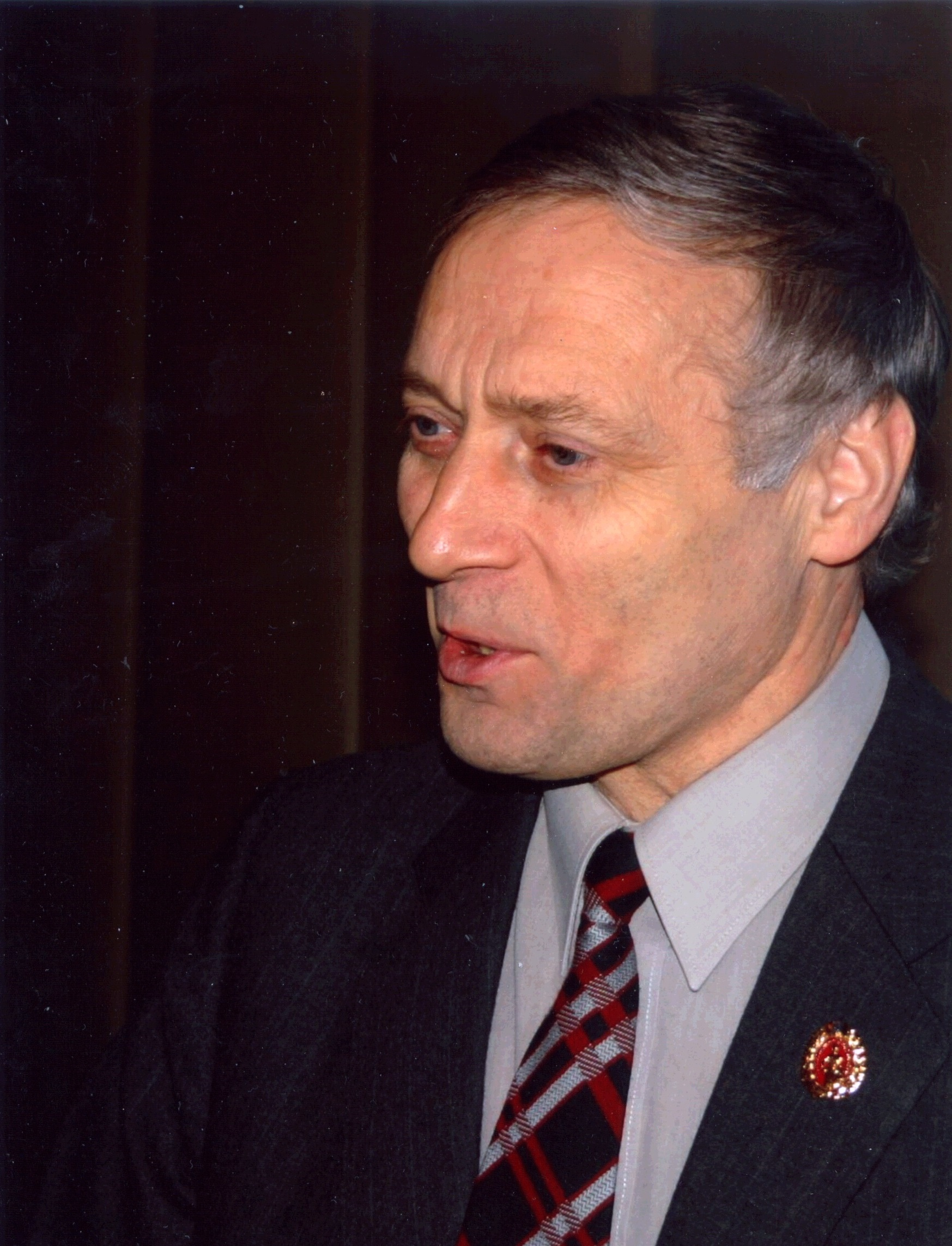
- Nosov in 2005

Permanent Representative of the President of Ukraine to the Constitutional Court of Ukraine
- In office 25 May 1998 – 22 January 2005
- President: Leonid Kuchma
- Preceded by: Position established
- Succeeded by: Volodymyr Shapoval

People's Deputy of Ukraine
- In office 15 May 1990 – 12 May 1998
- Constituency: Independent, Poltava Oblast No. 318 (1990–1994); Independent, Poltava Oblast No. 319 (1994–1998)

Personal details
- Born: 19 April 1946 (age 80) Sovetskaya Gavan, Khabarovsk Krai, Russian SFSR, Soviet Union (now Russia)
- Party: Independent
- Spouse: Alla Nosova
- Education: Lviv Polytechnic; Taras Shevchenko National University of Kyiv
- Awards: Order of Merit 3rd Class of Ukraine

Vladyslav Vasylyovych Nosov (Ukrainian: Владислав Васильович Носов, born 19 April 1946) is a Ukrainian politician, lawyer, and civil servant. He was a co-author of the Declaration of State Sovereignty of Ukraine, Declaration of Independence of Ukraine, the Regulations of Verkhovna Rada of Ukraine, and the Constitution of Ukraine. He was the first Permanent Representative of the President of Ukraine to the Constitutional Court of Ukraine, serving from 25 May 1998 to 22 January 2005.

== Biography ==
=== Early years ===
Vladyslav Nosov was born on 19 April 1946 in Sovetskaya Gavan, in the Russian Soviet Federative Socialist Republic of the Soviet Union to a family of civil servants. When he was a child his family moved to Ukraine. In 1964, he entered Radioengineering faculty of Lviv Polytechnic University and graduated from it in 1969. He was sent to work in Poltava defense factory "Znamia" by the administration of university. He held the position of design engineer, then the position of chief engineer from 1969 to 1983. From 1983 to 1986 he worked as a head of electronic systems design sector of Poltava design technological institute. From 1986 to 1990 he worked as a senior electronics engineer in Poltava factory of artificial diamonds and diamond tools.

While working on engineering positions he had an active civil position, particularly in defending the rights of workers for getting housing from the state. He found himself in a conflict with the party leadership of the factory, which refused to provide housing to the workers that was guaranteed to them under current law. He got a big respect of his co-workers because of this and on the following parliamentary elections he was nominated as a parliamentary candidate.

=== Political career ===
On 15 May 1990 he was elected to Verkhovna Rada of Ukraine in Oktyabrskyi electoral district No.318 in Poltava Oblast. He received 87.38% of votes. During his work in Verkhovna Rada he never was a member of any party. During the first convocation he was a member of the Parliamentary commission on law and order. He was the co-author of the Declaration of State Sovereignty of Ukraine and Declaration of Independence of Ukraine. He joined the commission on developing of Constitution. He also took part in Regulations of Verkhovna Rada of Ukraine developing.

In 1994 he was reelected to Verkhovna Rada and became a member of parliament of the second convocation. He was appointed a member of the Parliamentary commission on budget. He continued to take part in developing of the Constitution as a member of the commission on developing of Constitution. Together with the other members of this Commission he presented a draft of the Constitution to the Verkhovna Rada, which was later approved during the "constitutional night". During the second convocation he entered Law faculty of Taras Shevchenko National University of Kyiv and studied there combining studying with his parliamentary and legislative activities. He graduated from the university with honours in 1996.

== Work in Presidential Administration ==
In 1998, a new office of the Permanent Representative of the President of Ukraine to the Constitutional Court of Ukraine was created in the top management of Presidential Administration of Ukraine, which was equal to deputy chief by status. Vladyslav Nosov was invited by President Leonid Kuchma to take this office. Nosov accepted the proposition, but with the condition that he will be fully secured from the political influence, saying that work his will be guided only by legal principles. Also he asked to be fully independent from Presidential Administration management with subordination only to President of Ukraine. Right after taking the office Nosov received second rank of civil servant, and after several months the first rank.

Nosov defended the position of the President of Ukraine on a permanent basis in almost all cases, which were heard by the Constitutional Court of Ukraine from 1998 to 2005, including the most profile cases, such as abolition of the death penalty, free school education, powers of the President of Ukraine, etc. The work of Vladyslav Nosov was highly appreciated by the President. President awarded Order of Merit 3rd class to Nosov in 2000. In 2004 Nosov received an honourable status of the Honored Lawyer of Ukraine.

In 2005, Nosov retired. After leaving active public service he was often invited and appointed as an expert on the interpretation and amendments to the Constitution of Ukraine. In 2012, the first President of Ukraine Leonid Kravchuk invited Nosov to the Scientific Expert Group on the creation of a Constitutional Assembly. Nosov continues to participate as an expert in scientific events, roundtables, debates on the Constitution of Ukraine and the Rules of the Verkhovna Rada of Ukraine.
