= Oleksandr Ihnatenko =

Ukrainian footballer

Personal information
- Full name: Oleksandr Viktorovych Ihnatenko
- Date of birth: 17 April 1993 (age 33)
- Place of birth: Luhansk, Ukraine
- Height: 1.75 m (5 ft 9 in)
- Position: Midfielder

Youth career
- 2010-2014: Zorya Luhansk

Senior career*
Years	Team	Apps	(Gls)
	ISTA	13+	(3+)
2010-2014	Zorya Luhansk	0	(0)
2014	VPK-Ahro Shevchenkivka	10	(2)
2015-2017	Sumy	46	(1)
2017	Zugdidi	17	(0)
2018-2020	Neftchi Kochkor-Ata		(4)
- * Club domestic league appearances and goals

Oleksandr Viktorovych Ihnatenko (Ukrainian: Олександр Вікторович Ігнатенко; born 17 April 1993) is a Ukrainian footballer who is last known to have played as a midfielder for Neftchi.

== Career ==
Ihnatenko started his career with the Ukrainian fifth division side ISTA.

In 2010, he signed for the reserves of Zorya in the Ukrainian top flight.

In 2015, Ihnatenko signed for the Ukrainian fifth division club VPK-Ahro.

Before the second half of 2014/15, he signed for Sumy in the Ukrainian second division, where he made 51 appearances and scored 1 goal.

In 2017, Ihnatenko signed for the Georgian second division team Zugdidi, where they suffered relegation to the Georgian third division.

Before the 2018 season, he signed for Neftchi in Kyrgyzstan.
