= Volodymyr Lanovyi =

Ukrainian politician and economist

- Володимир Лановий
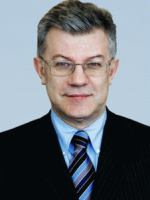

State Minister on issues of Property and Enterprises
- In office 5 June 1991 – 5 March 1992
- Prime Minister: Vitold Fokin

Minister of Economy
- In office 5 March 1992 – 6 March 1992
- Prime Minister: Vitold Fokin
- Preceded by: Anatoliy Minchenko
- Succeeded by: himself

Deputy Prime Minister Minister of Economy
- In office 6 March 1992 – 11 July 1992
- Prime Minister: Vitold Fokin
- Preceded by: Himself
- Succeeded by: Viktor Pynzenyk

People's Deputy of Ukraine
- In office 11 May 1994 – 12 May 1998
- Constituency: Kyiv, District No. 17
- In office 25 May 2006 – 8 June 2007
- Constituency: Rukh, No. 39
- In office 5 June 2012 – 12 December 2012
- Constituency: Our Ukraine, No. 84

Personal details
- Born: June 17, 1952 (age 74) Kyiv, Ukrainian SSR, Soviet Union
- Spouse: Valentyna Lanova
- Occupation: Politician, economist and professor

Volodymyr Tymofiiovych Lanovyi (Ukrainian: Володимир Тимофійович Лановий; born 17 June 1952) is a Ukrainian politician and economist.

== Career ==
Lanovyi was born in Kyiv on 17 June 1952. A graduate of the Kyiv National Economic University, he began his working career at the institute of micro instruments in the Krystal Science Production Association in 1973. He worked there until 1990 with a brief stint of compulsory military service in the mid 1970s.

In 1990, Lanovyi headed a department in the Institute of Economy of the National Academy of Sciences of Ukraine and was a direct designer of the law "About the economic sovereignty of Ukraine". In 1991-92, Lanovyi was a state minister on issues of property and entrepreneurship. In 1992, he was a vice prime minister and minister of economy.

Lanovyi was an independent candidate in the 1994 Ukrainian presidential election. In the first round he was in 4th place, supported by 2,483,986 votes (9.6%).

Founded the Club of Political Experts with the participation of the F. Ebert Foundation (Germany) for discussions of well-known politicians, businessmen and financiers in 1999.

In the July 2019 Ukrainian parliamentary election Lanovyi was fifth on the party list of Movement of New Forces.

Political offices
Preceded by Yuri Yekhanurov	Director of State Property Fund of Ukraine (acting); 1997–1998	Succeeded by Oleksandr Bondar
