= Petro Didyk (politician) =

Ukrainian politician

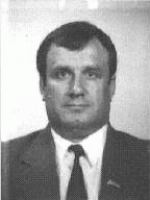

Member of the Verkhovna Rada
- In office 1994–1998

Personal details
- Born: May 26, 1954 (age 72) Horoshkiv, Kyiv Oblast, Ukraine
- Education: Kharkiv National University of Economics
- Occupation: Politician

Petro Andriyovych Didyk (Ukrainian: Петро Андрійович Дідик; born May 26, 1954, Horoshkiv, Kyiv Oblast) is a Ukrainian politician, the head of the Izyum City Council of People's Deputies in the Kharkiv Oblast. He served as a People's Deputy of Ukraine during the 2nd convocation of Verkhovna Rada.

== Biography ==
Petro Didyk was born on May 26, 1954, in Horoshkiv, Kyiv Oblast, Ukraine. In 1976, he graduated from the Kharkiv Polytechnic Institute with a degree in mechanical engineering.

From 1981, he worked as an engineer-technologist, chief technologist, and from September 1983 to June 1984, he served as the chief engineer. From June to August 1984, he was the acting director, and from August 1984 to May 1990, he served as the director of the Izyum Building Materials Plant, part of the Kharkivbudmaterials association.

In May 1990 – June 1994, he served as the head of the Izyum City Council and the head of the executive committee. In June 1994 to April 2002, he served as the head of the Izyum City Council of People's Deputies and the Mayor of Izyum.

He was a People's Deputy of Ukraine during the 2nd convocation of Verkhovna Rada from April 1994 (2nd round) to April 1998, representing the Izyum electoral district No. 380. He was a member of the Committee on Economic Policy and Management of the National Economy and a member of the parliamentary group "Unity".

In 1998, he graduated from Kharkiv National University of Economics.

Later, he became the head of the Izyum branch of the Joint Stock Company Kharkivgaz and was elected as a deputy to the Kharkiv Oblast Council.

He was a member of the Party of Industrialists and Entrepreneurs of Ukraine.
