= Peasant Party of Ukraine =

Peasant Party of Ukraine Селянська партія України
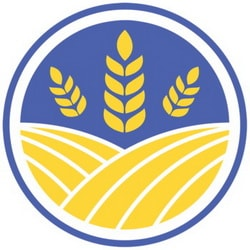
- Leader: Zynoviy Kholodniuk
- Founded: 25 January 1992
- Headquarters: Kyiv
- Ideology: Agrarianism; Agrarian socialism
- Political position: Centre-left to left-wing
- Colours: Yellow, Blue
- Verkhovna Rada: 0 / 450

Website
- selpu.com

The Peasant Party of Ukraine (Ukrainian: Селянська партія України, Selyans'ka Partiya Ukrayiny, SelPU) is an agrarian and socialist political party in Ukraine. It was created in 1992 as a successor of the Communist Party of Ukraine that was temporarily outlawed in 1991.

At the Ukrainian parliamentary election in 1994, the party obtained 2.74% of the votes and 19 out of 450 seats in the Verkhovna Rada. At the Ukrainian parliamentary election in 1998, it gained in coalition with the Socialist Party of Ukraine 8.56% of the vote and 35 seats. The SelPU faction in the Verkhovna Rada consisted of 14 deputies. After the creation of the new parliamentary faction Solidarity in 2000, a lot of deputies of the party moved to this new faction.

The following elections were not successful for the party. In the elections of 2002 the party won 0.37% of the votes, in 2006 0.31% and in the 2007 elections the party did not participate.

In the 2004 presidential elections, the party supported the candidature of Viktor Yanukovych.

In 2011, the party decided to join the Socialist Party of Ukraine. On 28 January 2012, this decision was declared illegal by the Justice Ministry.

The party did not participate in the 2014 Ukrainian parliamentary election.

In 2019, it supported Yulia Tymoshenko as a presidential candidate.

== Election results ==
Verkhovna Rada
Year	Party-list			Constituency/total	Overall seats won	Seat change	Government	Notes
Year	Popular vote	%	Seats/total	Constituency/total	Overall seats won	Seat change	Government	Notes
1994	794,614	2.93%	—N/a	19/338	19 / 450	▲19	Opposition	
1998	2,273,788	8.83%	10/225	2/220	12 / 450	▼7	Opposition	As part of Socialist Party – Peasant Party bloc
2002	98,428	0.39%	0/225	0/225	0 / 450	▼12	Extra-parliamentary	
2006	79,160	0.32%	0/450	—N/a	0 / 450	0	Extra-parliamentary	
2007	Did not participate						Extra-parliamentary	
2012	Did not participate						Extra-parliamentary	
2014	Did not participate						Extra-parliamentary	
2019	Did not participate						Extra-parliamentary	
