= Regionalism in Ukraine =

Regionalism in Ukraine has been a significant force during the building of an independent state after the dissolution of the Soviet Union in 1991. While most acutely this issue manifested itself during the 2014 pro-Russian unrest in Ukraine, other ethnic minorities in Ukraine sought for greater political or economical autonomy during 1990s. These movements, while not being secessionist, were perceived by central government as a threat to the unity of the state.

== Russian regionalism in Eastern/Southern Ukraine ==
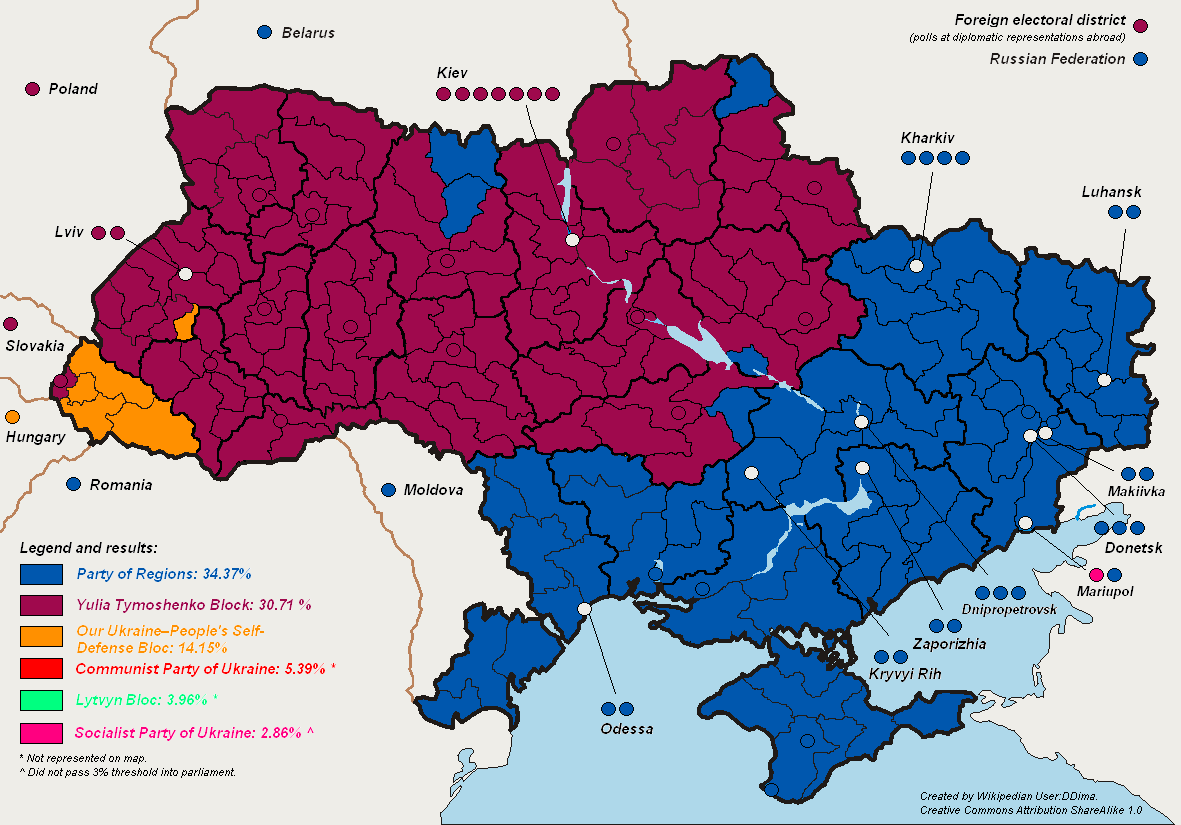
Many observers noted that political division of Ukraine, as seen in voting patterns during the elections in Ukraine roughly matches the distribution of the Russophone population.

Early attempts include suggestions of the Donetsk-Dnipro or Dnipro autonomous region. In 1990, a proposal was put forth in Odesa for a "special state status" of the historical area of Novorossiya which would have been included five Ukrainian oblasts plus Moldovan Transnistria, which is now a breakaway territory.

Of significant development was regionalism in Crimea, which was of varying political success since early 1990s and had eventually led to the annexation of Crimea by Russia.

In early 2014, Kyiv International Institute of Sociology polling showed that 38.4% of the residents of Donetsk Oblast and 41.9% of the residents of Luhansk Oblast wanted to transform Ukraine into a federal state. The comparable percentages were 32.2% in Kharkiv Oblast, 17.5% in Odesa Oblast, 15.3% in Zaporizhzhia Oblast, 11.4% in Dnipropetrovsk Oblast, 10.7% in Mykolaiv Oblast, and 6.9% in Kherson Oblast.

In 2019, polling showed that in the separatist-controlled Donbas, 58% of the residents wanted special autonomy (31% within Ukraine and 27% within Russia). The same polling also showed that in the Ukrainian-controlled Donbas, 33% of the residents wanted special autonomy (31% within Ukraine and just 2% within Russia). This polling also showed that 45% of the residents of the separatist-controlled Donbas prefer to live under Russian rule, in comparison to 55% who prefer to live under Ukrainian rule; meanwhile, in the Ukrainian-controlled part of the Donbas, 96% of the residents want to live under Ukrainian rule and just 4% want to live under Russian rule.

== Regionalism in Western Ukraine ==
In the light of violent pro-Russian events in the eastern part of Ukraine, Western Ukraine may be perceived as monolithic. Nevertheless, it has its own share of regionalism. Even before the Declaration of Independence of Ukraine, there have been calls for federalism in the historical Ukrainian region of Galicia. Galicia after the first partition of Poland (1772) was part of the Austrian Empire until its dissolution after World War I in 1918, and therefore its historical development was different from the parts of Ukraine which belonged to the Russian Empire. A representative of the Galician regionalism was Viacheslav Chornovil, one of the first leaders of the Rukh movement, who was instrumental in the convocation of the Galician Assembly. While one of the important resolutions of the Assembly was "On the Unity of the Ukrainian Lands", Chornovil was severely criticized for "separatism" and eventually abandoned the idea.

In Transcarpathia, the Congress of Carpathian Ruthenians led by Dimitry Sydor was for the autonomy of Subcarpathian Ruthenia within Ukraine. Sydor and some other Ruthenian activists were accused of being the tools of the Russian politics of destabilization of Ukraine.

Ukrainian Hungarians in Transcarpathia suggested to transform the Berehove Raion into a Hungarian national district. Other minorities (Ukrainian Romanians/Moldovans in Bukovina and Bessarabian Bulgarians and Gagauz in Odesa Oblast) also sought local autonomy.

== See also ==
- South-East Ukrainian Autonomous Republic
