= Andriy Chornovil =

Ukrainian politician

Personal details
- Born: 21 June 1962 (age 64) Lvov, Lvov Oblast, Ukrainian SSR, Soviet Union
- Children: 1
- Education: Danylo Halytsky Lviv National Medical University
- Occupation: Docent of the Department of infectious disease Member of the Lviv Regional Council

Military service
- Allegiance: Soviet Union
- Branch/service: Armed Forces
- Years of service: 1988–1990
- Rank: Captain
- Unit: in Kaliningrad Oblast
- Military occupation: doctor/chief of regiment medical section

Andriy Vyacheslavovych Chornovil (Ukrainian: Андрій В'ячеславович Чорновіл; born 21 June 1962) is a Ukrainian politician and pediatrician who was a self-nominated candidate in the 2004 Ukrainian presidential election. In the election he collected over 36,000 votes, placing 11th place.

== Family ==
He is the elder son of the famous Ukrainian dissident and a leader of People's Movement of Ukraine, Vyacheslav Chornovil and his first wife Iryna Brunevets. According to Vyacheslav's longtime press secretary, Dmytro Ponamarchuk, Andriy and his father had been estranged prior to Vyacheslav's death as he had not spoken to his father for 15 years, although Ponamarchuk never gave an explanation as to why. Andriy has a brother, Taras Chornovil.

== Early life ==
Andriy Chornovil was born on 21 June 1962 in the city of Lviv, which was then part of Lviv Oblast in the Ukrainian SSR. In 1979, he graduated from Lviv Secondary School N63, and afterwards he worked as a laborer at a collective farm in Kurovychi and as a loader at Lviv Canteen Trust N1. He pivoted to medicine in 1980, entering the Danylo Halytsky Lviv National Medical University, and also started working as a nurse at the Lviv Regional Clinical Hospital. He graduated from the university in 1986. Chornovil then completed an internship as an infectious disease doctor at the Volyn Regional Hospital and was then a doctor at the central district hospital of Ivanychi in Volyn.

== Political career ==
Andriy Chornovil is a deputy of Lviv regional council. Since June 2004 he has been an Assistant Professor of Infection Illnesses at the National Medical University of Lviv. From 2002 to 2003, he was a leading expert at the board of health care of the Lviv Regional State Administration, and a senior inspector of Western regional customs.
