= Mykhailo Batih =

Ukrainian politician and journalist

Merited Journalist Mykhailo Batih
- Михайло Батіг
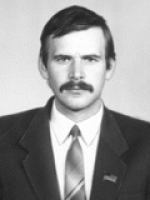
- Official portrait, 1990

People's Deputy of Ukraine
- In office 15 May 1990 – 10 May 1994
- Preceded by: Position established
- Succeeded by: Ihor Koliushko
- Constituency: Lviv Oblast, Busk

Personal details
- Born: 7 September 1955 (age 70) Lviv, Ukrainian SSR, Soviet Union (now Ukraine)
- Party: Ukrainian People's Party
- Other political affiliations: Democratic Bloc; People's Movement of Ukraine; Democratic Party of Ukraine
- Education: University of Lviv

Military service
- Allegiance: Soviet Union
- Branch/service: Internal Troops

Mykhailo Ivanovych Batih (Ukrainian: Миха́йло Іва́нович Баті́г; born 7 September 1955) is a journalist and Ukrainian politician who served as a People's Deputy of Ukraine from 1990 to 1994, representing the city of Busk as a member of the People's Movement of Ukraine, or Rukh. He was general director of the Ukrainian Independent Information Agency from 1993 to 2002.

== Early life and career ==
Mykhailo Ivanovych Batih was born on 7 September 1955 in the city of Lviv to a working-class Ukrainian family. He first studied at the University of Lviv's legal faculty and served as a member of the internal troops guarding penal colonies, a lifestyle that led him to reconsider his career choices. He changed to the faculty of journalism, studying from 1976 to 1981. Following his graduation, he worked at Leninist Youth (now Young Galicia), a newspaper in Lviv. He gradually rose through the ranks throughout the 1980s, becoming chief correspondent of Lviv Oblast's youth-oriented state media in 1985. He would serve in this role until 1993.

== Political career ==
Batih was active in the local Komsomol leadership in Lviv Oblast prior to entering politics, and he was co-chairman of the regional branch of the human rights group Memorial. He was a candidate from the People's Movement of Ukraine (Ukrainian: Народний рух України, romanized: Narodnyi rukh Ukrainy; abbreviated Rukh), part of the Democratic Bloc coalition, in the city of Busk during the 1990 Ukrainian Supreme Soviet election. He was successfully elected a runoff election in the constituency, making him one of a number of Democratic Bloc candidates that were elected in the Lviv Oblast landslide.

Within the Supreme Soviet of the Ukrainian Soviet Socialist Republic (later the Verkhovna Rada), Batih was a member of the Glasnost and Media Committee. He later joined the Democratic Party of Ukraine. Batih, alongside Rukh leader Viacheslav Chornovil, revealed that communist deputies had been instructed by the central party apparatus to amend the Declaration of State Sovereignty of Ukraine in order to remove provisions that would allow for an independent military or judiciary.

Following the 1991 Declaration of Independence of Ukraine, Batih was one of a number of deputies who argued against Ukraine's ratification of START I. Batih stated that comments by Russian president Boris Yeltsin claiming parts of Ukrainian territory necessitated a nuclear deterrent to prevent the outbreak of armed conflict. He did not run in the 1994 Ukrainian parliamentary election and subsequently left office.

Batih participated in the 2006 Ukrainian parliamentary election as the 42nd candidate on the proportional list of the Ukrainian National Bloc of Kostenko and Plyushch. At the time, he was a member of the Ukrainian People's Party. He was not elected to the Verkhovna Rada. Batih expressed support for the return of the Kuban to Ukraine in 2019.

== Journalist career ==
Batih became general director of the Ukrainian Independent Information Agency (UNIAN) in 1993, remaining in the position until 2002. He was awarded the title of Merited Journalist of Ukraine in October 1999. Following Batih's tenure at UNIAN, he was accused by editors of the newspaper Segodnya of serving as an in-house censor against articles revealing the extent of President Viktor Yanukovych's opulence at his Mezhyhirya Residence. Batih denied the allegations.
