= Oleksandr Shandriuk =

Ukrainian politician (1953–before 2013)

- Олександр Шандрюк
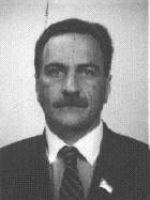
- Official portrait, 1994

People's Deputy of Ukraine
- In office 11 May 1994 – 12 May 1998
- Preceded by: Viacheslav Chornovil
- Succeeded by: Constituency abolished
- Constituency: Lviv Oblast, Shevchenkivskyi District

Personal details
- Born: 11 March 1953 Zaporizhzhia, Ukrainian SSR, Soviet Union
- Died: Before 15 May 2013 (aged 60)
- Party: Ukrainian Republican Party (1990–2000)
- Other political affiliations: National Front (1998); Our Ukraine–People's Self-Defense Bloc (2007)
- Education: Kyiv Institute of Agriculture (KEN)

Oleksandr Ivanovych Shandriuk (Ukrainian: Олександр Іванович Шандрюк; 11 March 1953 – before 15 May 2013) was a Ukrainian politician who served as a People's Deputy of Ukraine from 1994 to 1998, representing the city of Lviv's Shevchenkivskyi District for the Ukrainian Republican Party.

== Biography ==
Oleksandr Ivanovych Shandriuk was born 11 March 1953 in the city of Zaporizhzhia, in southern Ukraine. From 1970 to 1974 he studied at the Kyiv Institute of Agriculture (now the Kyiv National Economic University) with a specialisation in economics. He completed his dissertation in 1989, becoming a Candidate of Economic Sciences. From 1974 to 1985 he worked as an engineer at various state-owned enterprises, including under the Minister of Higher and Secondary Education from 1984 to 1985. He studied at the Centre for Research of Scientific and Technological Potential and Scientific History of the Academy of Sciences of Ukraine from November 1985 to January 1986 before working at the Academy until 1992. He was later employed at the Embassy of Ukraine in Canada from 1992 to 1993 as an adviser on economic, trade and scientific affairs.

Shandriuk joined the Ukrainian Republican Party in May 1990. He ran in Shevchenkivskyi District, Lviv during the 1994 Ukrainian parliamentary election as the URP's candidate, successfully winning election. He was a candidate in the 1998 Ukrainian parliamentary election for Ukraine's 118th electoral district, representing the right-wing National Front coalition. He was not elected. He led the URP from October 1998 until November 2000, when he left the party. He later contested the 2007 Ukrainian parliamentary election on the proportional representation list of the Our Ukraine–People's Self-Defense Bloc, though he was not successfully elected.

Shandriuk was deceased by 15 May 2013.
