= Atena Pashko =

Ukrainian chemical engineer, poet, social activist (1931–2012)

Atena-Sviatomyra Pashko
- Атена-Святомира Пашко
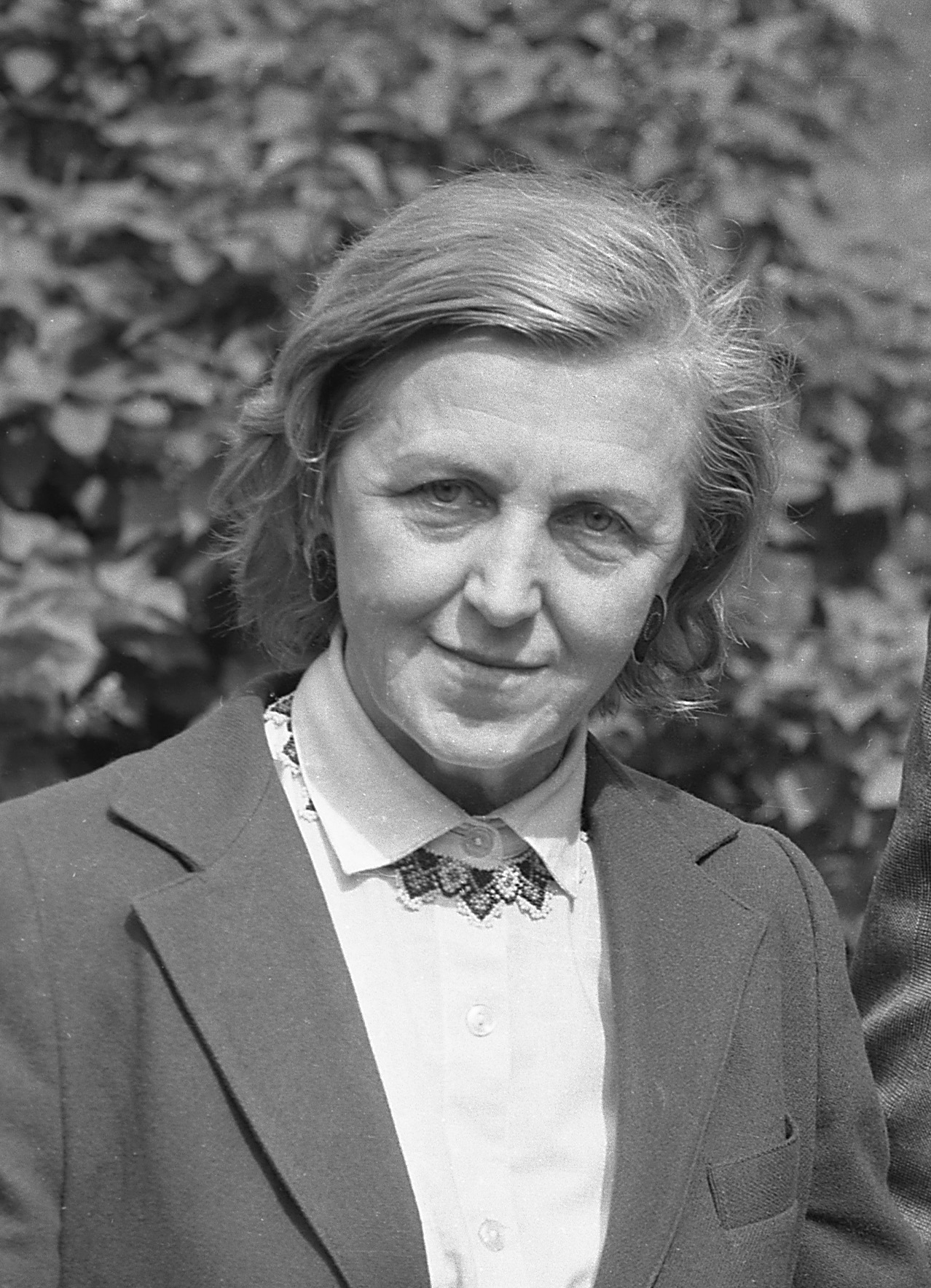
- Pashko in 1990
- Born: 10 October 1931; Bystrytsia, Drohobych district, Lwów Voivodeship, Poland
- Died: 20 March 2012 (aged 80); Kyiv, Ukraine
- Resting place: Baikove Cemetery, Kyiv
- Education: Ukrainian National Forestry University
- Occupations: Chemical engineer; poet; social activist
- Spouse: Viacheslav Chornovil
- Writing career
- Notable awards: Order of Princess Olga; Order of Liberty

Atena-Sviatomyra Vasylivna Pashko (Ukrainian: Атена-Святомира Василівна Пашко; 10 October 1931 – 20 March 2012) was a Ukrainian chemical engineer, poet, and social activist in the Ukrainian rights movement. Her published poetry collections include, On the crossroads (На перехрестях), Volume 1, 1989; On the tip of a candle (На вістрі свічки), 1991; and The blade of my trail (Лезо моєї стежки), 2007.

Pashko was the Chair of the Union of Ukrainian Women (1991), and served as president of the Viacheslav Chornovil International Charitable Foundation (1999). Administratively repressed during the Soviet era, she was later a recipient of the Order of Princess Olga and the Order of Liberty.

== Biography ==
Athena Pashko was born on 10 October 1931 in the village of Bystrytsia, Drohobych district, Lwów Voivodeship, an administrative unit of interwar Poland. She graduated from Ukrainian National Forestry University.

Since the mid-1960s, she was persecuted and banned from publishing her works for defending repressed Ukrainian cultural figures. A reprimand was announced at her place of work, and searches were conducted in her apartment. In 1970, she signed an appeal to the Supreme Court of the Ukrainian Soviet Socialist Republic with a demand to overturn the sentence of Veronica Morozova, for which she was fired. Pashko was constantly under KGB surveillance. In December 1991, the founding congress of the Ukrainian Women's Union took place in Kyiv, and Pashko was elected chair of the Union. She later held the title of, Honorary Chair of the Union of Ukrainian Women. After the tragic death of her husband, Viacheslav Chornovil, on 25 March 1999 in a car accident, Pashko continued her political mission, and was even called the guardian of the People's Movement of Ukraine. She died in Kyiv on 20 March 2012, and was buried in Kyiv at the Baikove Cemetery, next to her husband.

== Legacy ==
Athena Pashko Street in Buchach is named in her honor.

== Awards ==
- 18 August 1997, Order of Princess Olga, 3rd class, for outstanding personal contribution to the spiritual revival of Ukraine, solving the problems of family, women and children, professional and social activities for the benefit of the Ukrainian people
- 18 November 2009, Order of Liberty, for outstanding personal contribution to the defense of the national idea, the formation and development of the independent Ukrainian state, and active political and social activities

== Selected works ==
=== Poetry collections ===
- На перехрестях, Volume 1, 1989
- На вістрі свічки, 1991
- Лезо моєї стежки, 2007
