= Oleksandr Shevchenko (politician, born 1924) =

Soviet and Ukrainian politician (1924–2021)

- Олександр Шевченко
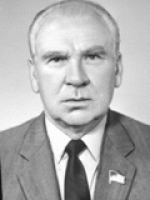

People's Deputy of Ukraine
- In office 15 May 1990 – 10 May 1994
- Preceded by: Position established
- Succeeded by: Viacheslav Chornovil
- Constituency: Ternopil Oblast, Zalishchyky

Personal details
- Born: 27 October 1924 Yampil, Ukrainian SSR, Soviet Union
- Died: 2021 (aged 96–97) Kyiv, Ukraine
- Party: Communist Party of the Soviet Union (1948–1991)
- Other political affiliations: For Social Justice
- Education: Prydniprovska State Academy of Civil Engineering and Architecture

Military service
- Allegiance: Soviet Union
- Branch/service: Red Army
- Battles/wars: World War II

Oleksandr Tykhonovych Shevchenko (Ukrainian: Олександр Тихонович Шевченко; 27 October 1924 – 2021) was a Soviet and Ukrainian politician who served as a People's Deputy of Ukraine from 1990 to 1994, representing the city of Zalishchyky for the Communist Party of the Soviet Union. He also served as Minister of Industrial Building Materials of the Ukrainian SSR from 1979.

== Biography ==
Oleksandr Tykhonovych Shevchenko was born 27 October 1924 in the village of Yampil, Kyiv Governorate to a family of ethnically-Ukrainian peasants. He served in the Red Army during World War II, later working as director of multiple factories before becoming deputy director of the Directorate of Industrial Building Materials of the Ukrainian SSR in 1968. He later rose through the ranks to become Minister of Industrial Building Materials in 1979. He was twice awarded the Order of the Red Banner of Labour. He graduated from the Dnipropetrovsk Engineering and Construction Institute (now the Prydniprovska State Academy of Civil Engineering and Architecture) with a specialisation in technological engineering.

Shevchenko joined the Communist Party of the Soviet Union in 1948, serving as a member of the Commission on Revision of the Communist Party of the Ukrainian SSR. He was a member of the tenth and eleventh convocations of the Supreme Soviet of the Ukrainian Soviet Socialist Republic. He was a candidate in the city of Zalishchyky during the 1990 Ukrainian Supreme Soviet election, winning election with 45.41% of the vote against three other candidates. He remained a member of the Communist Party until 1991 and joined the "For Social Justice" parliamentary faction. He was a member of the Commission on the Revival and Social Development of the Village.

Shevchenko left office in 1994. He received an honorary diploma from the government of Ukraine in October 2004, later dying in 2021.
