= Mikhail Kheifets =

Soviet dissident, Israeli writer and historian (1934–2019)

- Михаил Рувимович Хейфец
- Born: 18 January 1934; Leningrad, Russian SFSR, Soviet Union (now Saint Petersburg, Russia)
- Died: 25 November 2019 (aged 85); Israel
- Education: Herzen University
- Writing career
- Genres: History; memoirs; philosophy; journalism; literary criticism
- Literary movement: Soviet dissidents

Mikhail Ruvimovich Kheifets (Russian: Михаи́л Руви́мович Хе́йфец; 18 January 1934 – 25 November 2019) was a Soviet dissident who later became an Israeli writer and historian.

== Biography ==
Mikhail Ruvimovich Kheifets was born in Leningrad on 18 January 1934. He studied literature at Herzen University, and after his graduation worked as a teacher of literature at middle schools throughout the city. In 1966, he left his job as a teacher to become a full-time writer. Kheifets' works were published by several publishing houses, including Soviet Writer (which published the Paths to the Unknown poetry collection) and Young Guard (which published the book Secretary of the Secret Police), as well as multiple magazines. At the time, Kheifets was a member of the Leningrad branch of the Union of Soviet Writers.

Kheifets was arrested in 1974 on charges of anti-Soviet agitation after writing a preface to a collection of Joseph Brodsky's works, as well as copying Andrei Amalrik's essay Will the Soviet Union Survive Until 1984?. He was sentenced to four years of imprisonment and two years of internal exile. He was imprisoned at Camp 17-A in Ozerny, Zubovo-Polyansky District, where he met Ukrainian dissident leader Viacheslav Chornovil. Kheifets referred to Chornovil as "general of the zeks" for his ability to gather other prisoners into a united front against the Soviet government despite disparate and contradictory political views, including Ukrainian and Russian nationalism. The nickname has since become a common phrase used to refer to Chornovil. Kheifets wrote three books while imprisoned, all of which were smuggled abroad and published in Paris.

Following his 1980 release from his prison, Kheifets made aliyah to Israel, where he continued his writing career. He also wrote as a journalist and a philosopher. During his life in Israel, Kheifets wrote 15 books. Kheifets died on 25 November 2019 in Israel. He was buried in Beersheba.
