= Viacheslav Chornovil =

Ukrainian activist and politician (1937–1999)

Hero of Ukraine Viacheslav Chornovil
- В'ячеслав Чорновіл
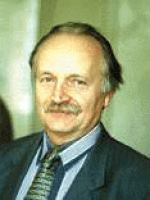
- Chornovil in 1998

People's Deputy of Ukraine
- In office 29 March 1998 – 25 March 1999
- Constituency: People's Movement of Ukraine, No. 1^{[A]}
- In office 10 May 1994 – 29 March 1998
- Preceded by: Oleksandr Shevchenko
- Succeeded by: Constituency abolished
- Constituency: Ternopil Oblast, No. 357
- In office 15 May 1990 – 10 May 1994
- Preceded by: Position established
- Succeeded by: Oleksandr Shandriuk
- Constituency: Lviv Oblast, Shevchenkivskyi District

Leader of the People's Movement of Ukraine
- In office December 1992 – 25 March 1999^{[B]}
- Preceded by: Ivan Drach
- Succeeded by: Hennadiy Udovenko

Chairman of the Lviv Oblast Council
- In office April 1990 – April 1992
- Preceded by: Position established
- Succeeded by: Mykola Horyn

Personal details
- Born: 24 December 1937 Yerky, Kyiv Oblast, Ukrainian SSR, Soviet Union
- Died: 25 March 1999 (aged 61) Near Boryspil, Kyiv Oblast, Ukraine
- Cause of death: Traffic collision^{[C]}
- Party: People's Movement of Ukraine (from 1989)
- Other political affiliations: Komsomol (c. late 1950s–1966)
- Spouses: Iryna Brunevets (m. 1960; div. 1962) Olena Antoniv (m. 1963, divorced) Atena Pashko (m. 1969)
- Children: Andriy; Taras
- Education: Taras Shevchenko National University of Kyiv
- Awards: Hero of Ukraine (2000); Order of Prince Yaroslav the Wise (1997); Shevchenko National Prize (1996)
- A. Party-list proportional representation seat. B. De facto from 8 September 1989. Disputed with Yuriy Kostenko from 17 or 19 February 1999. C. The circumstances of Chornovil's death are disputed; § Conspiracy theories and investigations for further information.

Viacheslav Maksymovych Chornovil (Ukrainian: В'ячеслав Максимович Чорновіл, Ukrainian pronunciation: [ʋjɐt͡ʃesˈlau̯ mɐkˈsɪmowɪt͡ʃ t͡ʃornoˈwʲil]; 24 December 1937 – 25 March 1999) was a Ukrainian dissident, independence activist and politician who was the leader of the People's Movement of Ukraine from 1989 until his death in 1999. He spent a total of fifteen years imprisoned or exiled by the Soviet government for his human rights activism. A People's Deputy of Ukraine from 1990 to 1999, Chornovil was among the first and most prominent anti-communists to hold public office in Ukraine. He twice ran for the presidency of Ukraine; the first time, in 1991, he was defeated by Leonid Kravchuk, while in 1999 he died in a car crash under disputed circumstances.

Chornovil was born in the village of Yerky, in central Ukraine, then under the Soviet Union. A member of the Komsomol from his time in university, he was affiliated with the counter-cultural Sixtiers movement, and was removed from the Komsomol after speaking out against communism. His samvydav, which investigated abuses against intellectuals arrested during the 1965–1966 Soviet crackdown, earned him Western acclaim, as well as a three-year prison sentence in Yakutia. Upon his release, he returned to samvydav and began publishing The Ukrainian Herald, a predecessor to the modern Ukrainian independent press .

In 1972, Chornovil was caught in another purge of intellectuals, and would not be allowed to return to Ukraine until 1985. He spent most of this time incarcerated. While in prison, Chornovil was described by fellow dissident Mikhail Kheifets as "general of the zeks" for his leadership of Ukrainian political prisoners, and recognised as a prisoner of conscience by Amnesty International. His release came as the Soviet government loosened restrictions on free speech as part of perestroika. Chornovil actively engaged in building political opposition to the Communist rule in Ukraine, eventually culminating in the establishment of the People's Movement of Ukraine (Rukh) party and a popular revolution that toppled Communism. Amidst the revolution, Chornovil took office as a member of Ukraine's parliament. He was one of the two main candidates in the 1991 Ukrainian presidential election, though he was defeated by former Communist leader Leonid Kravchuk. Chornovil actively promoted Ukrainian membership in the European Union and opposition to the emergence of the Ukrainian oligarchs.

Chornovil was a controversial figure in his lifetime, and the last months of his life were dominated by a split in the Rukh. His death in a car crash during the 1999 Ukrainian presidential election, during which he was a candidate in opposition to incumbent president Leonid Kuchma, has led to conspiracy theories and several years of investigations and trials, which have neither confirmed nor eliminated assassination as a possibility. He is a popular figure in present-day Ukraine, where he has twice been placed among the top ten most popular Ukrainians and is a symbol of the country's democracy and human rights activism as well as Pro-Europeanism.

== Early life and education ==
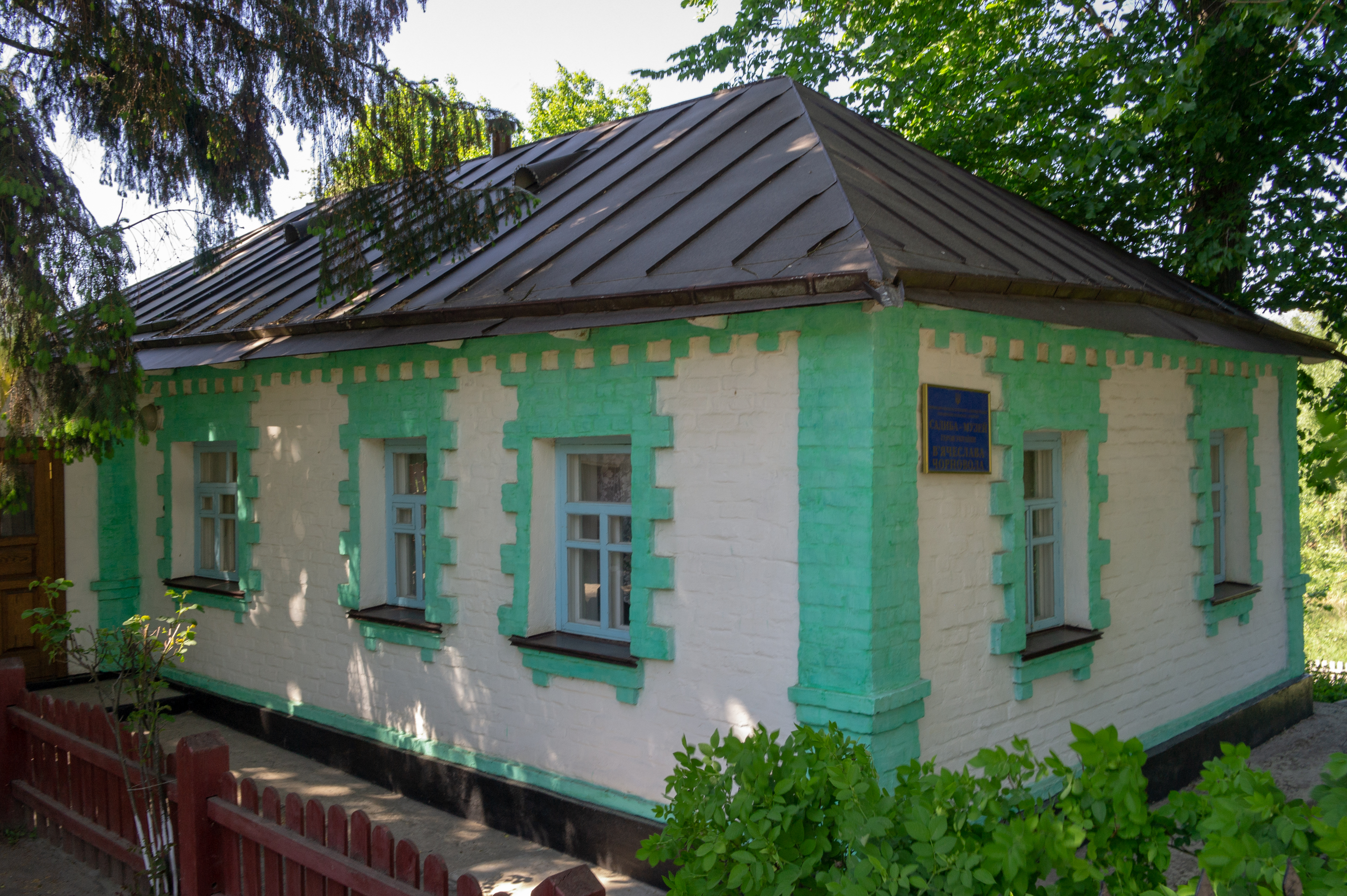
Chornovil's childhood home in Vilkhovets, Cherkasy Oblast

Viacheslav Maksymovych Chornovil was born on 24 December 1937 in the village of Yerky, in what was then the Ukrainian Soviet Socialist Republic, to a family of teachers. His father, Maksym Iosypovych Chornovil, was descended from Cossack nobility, while his mother was part of the aristocratic Tereshchenko family. Born and raised during the Great Purge, Viacheslav's childhood was dominated by Soviet repressions; his paternal uncle, Petro Iosypovych, was executed, while his father lived as a fugitive from the law in Ukraine. During World War II and the German occupation of Ukraine the Chornovil family lived in the village of Husakove, where Viacheslav attended school. He later claimed in his autobiography that following the recapture of Husakove by the Soviet Union, his family was expelled from the village. They later lived in Vilkhovets, where they had lived prior to Husakove, and where Viacheslav later graduated from middle school with a gold medal (Note: In the Soviet Union and its successor states, a school medal is given to secondary school graduates in recognition of academic achievement; the golden one is the highest such distinction.) in 1955. Chornovil's tumultuous childhood led his parents to avoid teaching him about Ukrainian nationalism, instead favouring an upbringing where he was educated in communist ideology and taught values such as friendship of peoples and proletarian internationalism.

Chornovil enrolled at the Taras Shevchenko University of Kyiv the same year, studying to become a journalist. At this time he also joined the Komsomol, the youth division of the Communist Party of the Soviet Union (CPSU). The negative response by Kyiv's Russophone population to those who spoke the Ukrainian language disgruntled him and left him with an increased consciousness of his status as a Ukrainian. Like other young Soviet activists of the time, Chornovil was also influenced by the 20th Congress of CPSU in 1956, in which Nikita Khrushchev gave a speech denouncing the rule of Joseph Stalin.

Chornovil's noncomformist views brought him into conflict with the faculty's newspaper, which condemned him for "nonstandard thinking" in 1957. As a result, he was forced to pause his studies and sent to work as an udarnik constructing a blast furnace in the Donbas city of Zhdanov (today known as Mariupol). He also worked as an itinerant editor for the Kyiv Komsomolets newspaper. After a year, he returned to his studies, graduating in 1960 with distinction. His diploma dissertation was on the works of Borys Hrinchenko, a prominent 19th- and early 20th-century Ukrainian writer and independence activist. The same year, he married his first wife, Iryna Brunevets. The two had one son, Andriy, before divorcing in 1962.

== Journalistic and party career ==
Following his graduation, Chornovil became an editor at Lviv Television (now Suspilne Lviv) in July 1960, where he had previously worked as an assistant from January of the same year. He wrote scripts for the channel's youth programming. During this time, Chornovil also took up literary criticism, focusing particularly on the works of Hrinchenko, Taras Shevchenko, and Volodymyr Samiilenko. Some of it also appeared on TV - for example, in 1962 he broadcast features on Mykhailo Stelmakh, Vasyl Chumak and the Young Muse group. During this time, he possibly met and interacted with Zenovii Krasivskyi, who was studying television journalism at the University of Lviv. Much like Chornovil, Krasivskyi would later become a leader of the dissident movement.

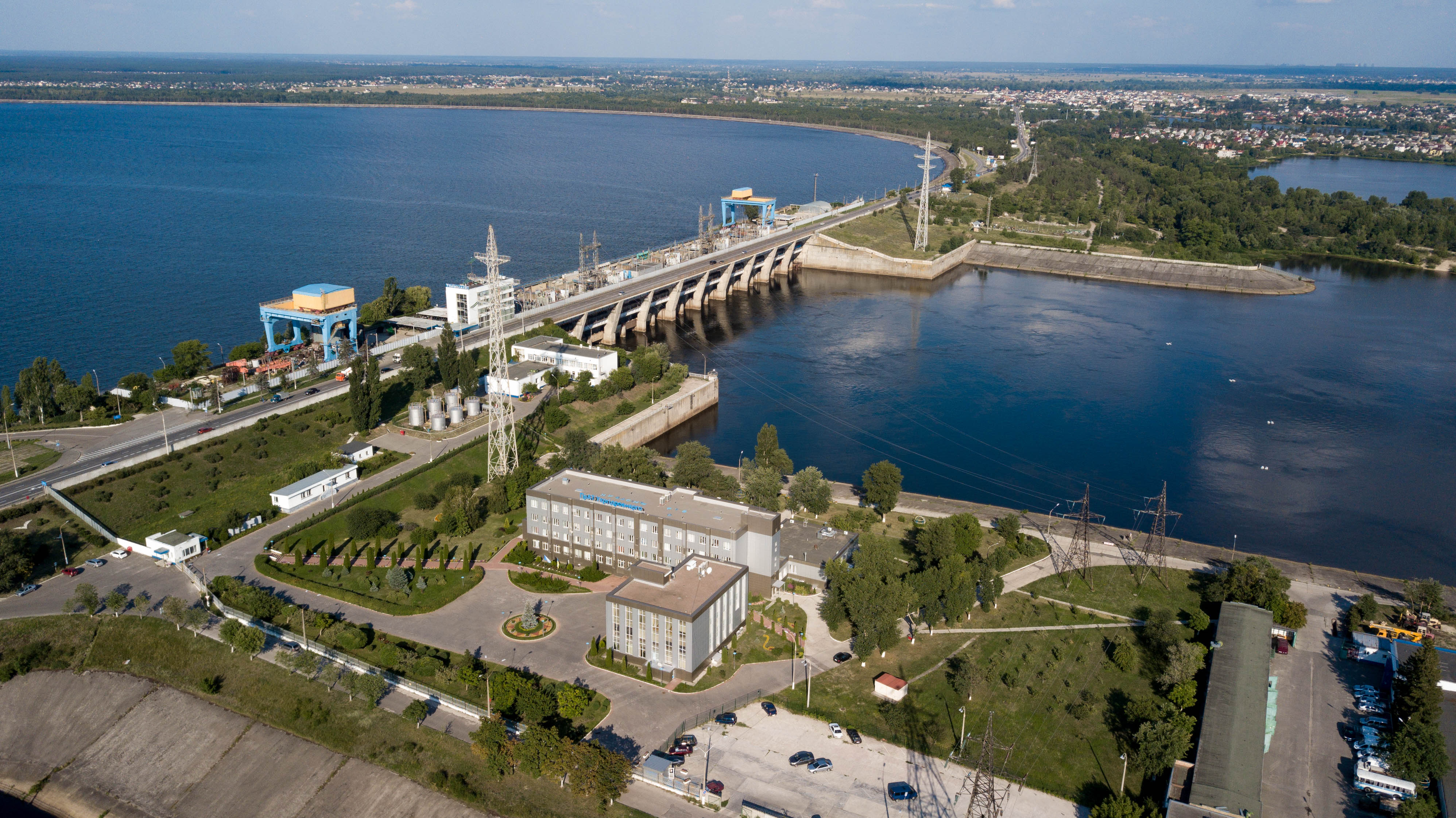
Kyiv Hydroelectric Power Plant, where Chornovil worked as a Komsomol secretary from 1963 to 1964

Chornovil left his job at Lviv Television in May 1963 to return to Kyiv, intending to complete his Candidate of Sciences thesis. There, he was the Komsomol secretary for the construction of Kyiv Hydroelectric Power Plant in nearby Vyshhorod. He simultaneously worked as an editor for the Kyiv-based newspapers Young Guard and Second Reading, and was part of the Artistic Youths' Club, an informal group of intellectuals affiliated with the counter-cultural Sixtiers movement. In June 1963, Chornovil married his second wife, Olena Antoniv, and by 1964, Chornovil's second son, Taras, was born. Chornovil also passed exams for post-graduate courses at the Kyiv Paedagogical Institute in 1964. However, due to his political activity (including his involvement in the Artistic Youths' Club) he was denied the right to pursue a Doctor of Sciences degree.

On 9 March 1964, the Soviet Union celebrated the 150th anniversary of Taras Shevchenko, Ukraine's national poet. The CPSU's official position on Shevchenko, particularly during the Shevchenko Days, emphasised the poet's role in anti-serfdom activities and his resistance to tsarist autocracy. In his speech to the workers of the Kyiv Hydroelectric Power Plant, Chornovil departed from the prescribed interpretations by presenting Shevchenko as a uniquely Ukrainian hero. Chornovil implored the audience to interpret Kobzar, the poet's main collection of works, as a manifestation of "trembling love for the disgraced and despised native land". He also suggested that Shevchenko's works showed that "every system built on the oppression of man by man, on contempt for human dignity and inalienable human rights, on the suppression of free, human thoughts, on the oppression of one nation by another nation, and in whatever new form it may hide [...] is against human nature, and must be destroyed." Historian Yaroslav Seko interprets this speech as typical of the Sixtiers movement, but wrote that at the time, Ivan Dziuba, writer of Internationalism or Russification?, and fellow dissident Yevhen Sverstiuk had far more influence.

On 8 August 1965, during the opening of a monument to Shevchenko in the village of Sheshory, Chornovil gave a speech with strongly anti-communist overtones. As a result, he was fired from his Komsomol job. Following his firing, Chornovil wrote several letters to the leadership of the Komsomol in an unsuccessful effort to demonstrate his innocence.

== Dissident and human rights activist ==
=== 1965–1966 purge and aftermath ===
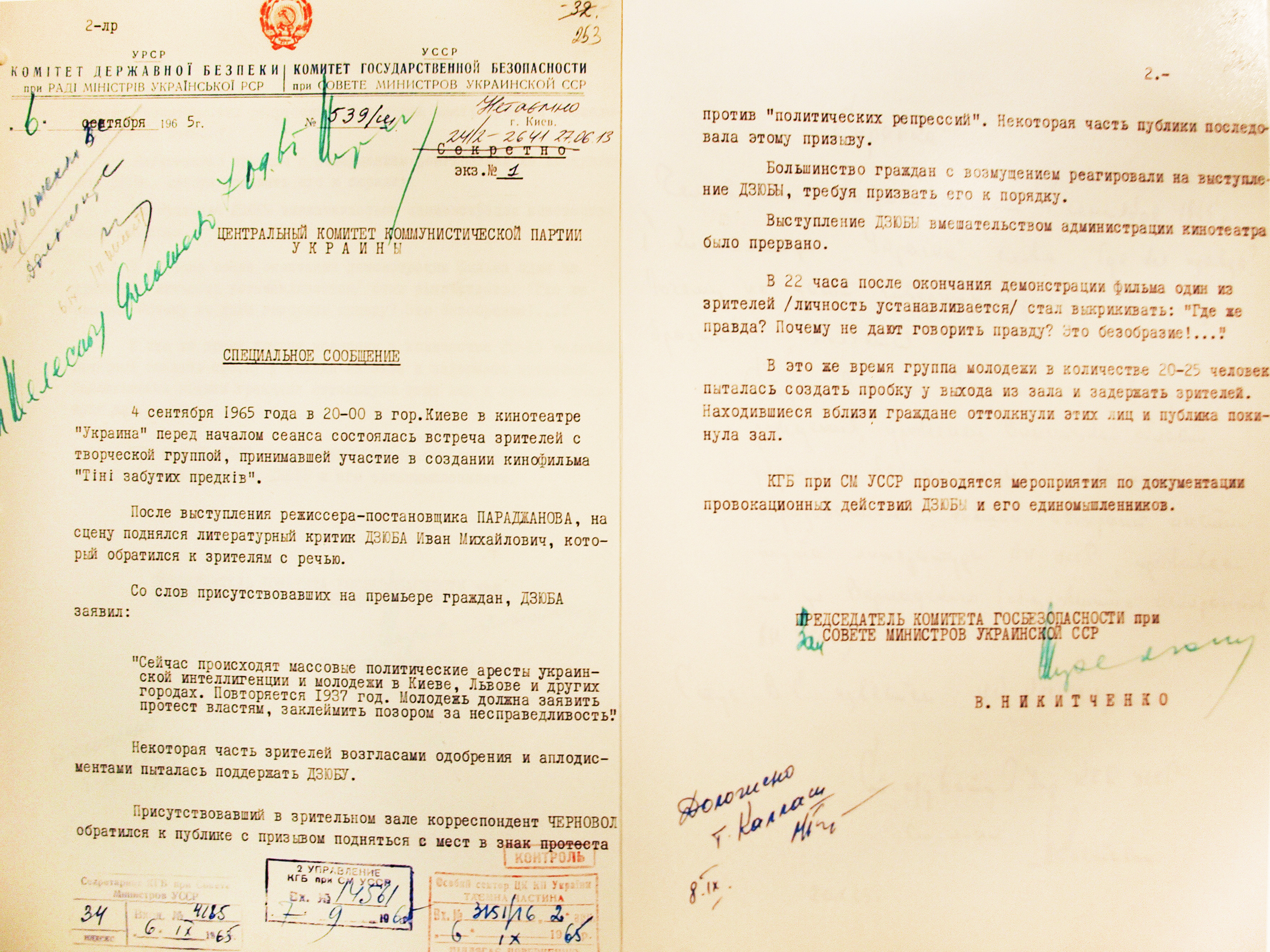
A KGB report mentioning Chornovil's participation in the protest in Ukraine cinema on 4 September 1965

1965 marked the beginning of a series of mass arrests of Sixtier intellectuals as the relatively liberal Nikita Khrushchev was removed and replaced by Leonid Brezhnev. In protest of the arrests, Chornovil, as well as Dziuba and student Vasyl Stus, held a demonstration inside the Ukraine Kyiv cinema, which disrupted the 4 September premiere of Sergei Parajanov's Shadows of Forgotten Ancestors. Chornovil shouted "Whoever is against tyranny, stand up!" (Note: Ukrainian: Хто проти тиранії – встаньте!. Chornovil later gave a slightly different version of his call as "I call on all those protesting against the resumption of the terror and repressions to stand up!" (Ukrainian: Закликаю всіх, хто протестує проти відновлення терору й репресій, устати!).) Later recollections of this event by Chornovil and Dziuba differed significantly. Dziuba later claimed that he did not recall Chornovil being present or even aware of the event. Chornovil, on the other hand, said that he and Dziuba had independently come to the conclusion that a public protest against the purge was necessary, and that after Dziuba's attempted speech was drowned out by the audience, Chornovil continued the protest by shouting that phrase. Seko contrasts Dziuba's more cautious, informative speech with Chornovil's more confrontational approach.

On 30 September of that year, Chornovil's Lviv flat was searched by the KGB, the Soviet security agency. 190 pieces of literature were confiscated, including the Galician–Volhynian Chronicle, the Books of the Genesis of the Ukrainian People, monographs and articles by authors Panteleimon Kulish, Volodymyr Antonovych, Volodymyr Hnatiuk, Dmytro Doroshenko, Ivan Krypiakevych, and Volodymyr Vynnychenko, as well as history books about the Polish–Lithuanian Commonwealth, the First World War and the Ukrainian War of Independence. Two later raids by the KGB on his flat, on 3 August 1967 and 12 January 1972, led to further confiscations of literature, though both were of lesser size than during the September 1965 raid.

Later that year, with the purges continuing, Chornovil was called to give evidence at the trials of Sixtiers Mykhaylo Osadchy, Bohdan and Mykhailo Horyn, and Myroslava Zvarychevska. Chornovil refused, and as a result was fired from his editor position at Second Reading. He turned to samvydav, publishing Court of Law or a Return of the Terror?, which questioned the legality and constitutionality of the Sixtiers' sentences, in May 1966. On 8 July he was charged under article 179 of the Criminal Code of the Ukrainian SSR for his refusal to give testimony at the Sixtiers' trials, and sentenced to three months of hard labour with 20% of salary withheld. In this period, he worked various jobs, including as a technician in expeditions of the Academy of Sciences of Ukraine to the Carpathian Mountains, as an advertiser for KyivKnyhTorh, and as a teacher at the Lviv Regional Centre for Protection of Nature.

In 1967 Chornovil published his second work of samvydav. Known as Woe from Wit: Portraits of Twenty "Criminals", it included information on those arrested during the 1965–1966 crackdown and violations of the law committed by Soviet authorities during their arrests. Chornovil sent the work to the Central Committee of the Communist Party of Ukraine (CPU), the KGB of the Ukrainian SSR, the Writers' Union of Ukraine, and the Union of Artists of Ukraine. On 21 October 1967 it was read during a broadcast of the United States-backed Radio Liberty, and it was professionally printed by the end of the year. Chornovil's samvydav was published in the West in 1969 under the title of The Chornovil Papers, drawing attention to the purge at a time when public consciousness was focused largely on the Sinyavsky–Daniel trial. Chornovil's work established him as one of the leading figures among Ukrainian activists at the time, and, along with Dziuba's Internationalism or Russification?, demonstrated to those in the rest of Europe that Ukrainians were not fully accepting Soviet rule.

In addition to Woe from Wit, Chornovil also wrote complaints to the head of the Ukrainian KGB and the Prosecutor General of the Ukrainian SSR about investigators' violations of the law during the arrests of Sixtiers. On 5 May 1967, he was summoned to the office of E. Starykov, Deputy Prosecutor General of Lviv Oblast, who informed him of the existence of article 187-1 of the Criminal Code of the Ukrainian SSR. The law, which forbade defaming the Soviet system or government, was known to exist but did not figure on the books, so it was only during that meeting that Chornovil could have officially learned that he might have done something illegal. By that time, he already had a reputation of a troublemaker within the KGB.

=== Exile to Yakutia ===
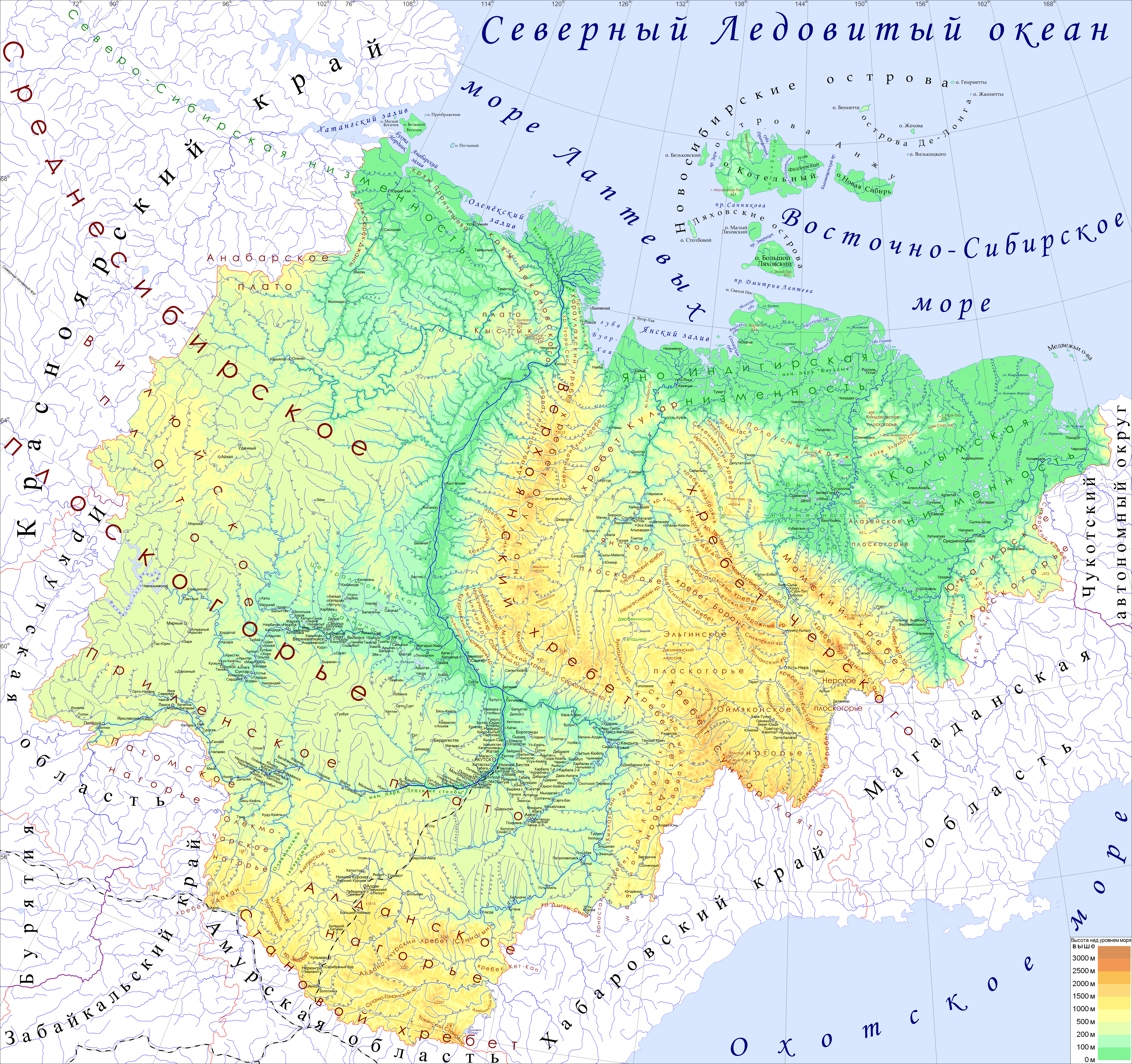
Chornovil was sent to the Yakut ASSR (map pictured) following his August 1967 arrest

Chornovil was arrested in August 1967 in response to Woe from Wit and charged under article 187–1. Another search of his flat resulted in the seizure of a copy of Woe from Wit, as well as Valentyn Moroz's samvydav booklet Report from the Beria Reserve, which served as the basis for the libel charges against him. Chornovil chose to deliver written, rather than spoken, testimony, as the latter option at the time carried the risks of having one's arguments distorted and manipulated during interrogations. Chornovil argued his innocence, as well as that of those who had been arrested during the purge, saying,

Representatives of the Ukrainian intelligentsia were arrested in August and September 1965 in Kyiv, Lviv, and other cities of Ukraine. They were charged with anti-Soviet propaganda, and the majority of them were convicted in 1965 in closed court processes. I personally knew several of those arrested and convicted; I never noticed anything anti-Soviet in their actions and words, but, on the contrary, I saw sincere concern for the state of Ukrainian culture, the Ukrainian language, for the restoration of normal socialist law and socialist democracy, which were trampled during the years of the tyranny of Stalin and Beria. None of this differs from the 20th Congress of the CPSU. Later, M. Osadchy, interrogated and searched as a witness in the case of a teacher and a former instructor of the Lviv Central Committee of the Communist Party of Ukraine, came to the conclusion that the KGB bodies, which conducted the investigation, allowed violations of procedural norms, fitting the investigation to preconceived qualifications.

He also stated that the process, and the lack of Soviet authorities' action on his complaints, had significantly reduced his faith in the Soviet system. He continued to insist, however, that he had no ill-will towards the Soviet government, alleging that he was being targeted by certain officials who wished to illegally prevent him from informing high-ranking officials about the state of the country. Chornovil was nevertheless convicted on 13 November 1967 and sentenced to three years' imprisonment. During this period, he lived in the village of Chappanda in the Yakut Autonomous Soviet Socialist Republic.

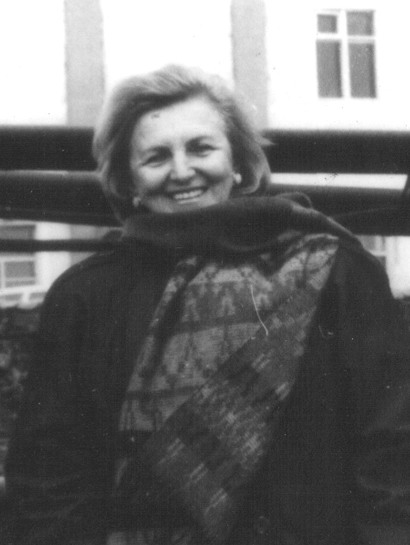
Atena Pashko, Chornovil's third and final wife

In 1969, Chornovil married fellow activist Atena Pashko, whom he had met at the home of Ivan Svitlychnyi, another dissident. The two were formally wed in the town of Nyurba in Yakutia.

=== Life between arrests (1969–1972) ===
Chornovil was released as part of a general amnesty in 1969. He struggled to find a stable job, working variously at a weather station in Zakarpattia Oblast, as an excavator during an archaeological expedition to Odesa Oblast, and as an employee at Sknyliv railway station. In September 1969, he also met Valentyn Moroz, another dissident who had been imprisoned as part of the 1965–1966 purge. The two quickly formed a friendship and paid frequent visits to each other, as they both sought to strengthen the dissident movement and further confront government abuses. During this time period, Chornovil, alongside Svitlychnyi and Sverstiuk, also led a donations campaign to prevent Moroz (unable to find employment due to his criminal record) from falling into poverty. The campaign collected 3,500 rubles (equivalent to 3,663,000 Russian rubles in 2023). He organised further donation campaigns for other formerly-imprisoned dissidents, such as Sviatoslav Karavanskyi and Nina Strokata.

In January 1970 Chornovil launched a new samvydav newspaper, known as The Ukrainian Herald. The newspaper contained other samvydav publications, as well as information on what he considered Great Russian chauvinism and anti-Ukrainian sentiment. It detailed human rights abuses by the Soviet government and the police, which Chornovil believed to be contrary to the constitution of the Soviet Union, and other information regarding the dissident movement in Ukraine. Chornovil was the chief editor of The Ukrainian Herald, and one of its three editors (alongside Mykhailo Kosiv and Yaroslav Kendzior). The Ukrainian Herald maintained a large professional staff, with correspondents throughout Ukraine (ranging as far east as Dnipropetrovsk and Donetsk), and has been described by biographer V. I. Matiash as the forerunner to independent press in Ukraine.

Fearing arrest, in July 1971 Chornovil wrote a letter to the United Nations Human Rights Committee, hoping that the international body would publish it if he was imprisoned. In the missive, he outlined examples of violations of the law by Soviet authorities, and argued that Soviet political prisoners lacked the right to defend themselves and were subject to a campaign of surveillance, blackmail, and threats. He rejected the possibility of cooperating with investigators, writing, "I would rather die behind bars than give in to the aforementioned principles."

At this time, Chornovil also adopted a belief in liberal democracy based on the beliefs of Mykhailo Drahomanov. In an October 1971 letter to Moroz, Chornovil remarked that in his studies of anarchist revolutionaries Pierre-Joseph Proudhon and Mikhail Bakunin, he had come to reject unconditional support for Drahomanov's policies, but believed that the earlier intellectual's views on self-government were worth supporting. This attitude later informed his support for federalism. During this time, Chornovil continued to describe himself as a socialist, writing in an undated letter that he had "always firmly adhered to the principles of socialism and continue to do so", while criticising the Soviet government for its restrictions on political freedoms.

Chornovil established the Civic Committee for the Defence of Nina Strokata on 21 December 1971, following the activist's arrest. This marked a change in his attitude towards the formation of human rights organisations; he had previously rejected them in favour of petition campaigns, viewing the formation of an organisation as impossible due to the circumstances of Ukraine's status within the Soviet Union. However, this position had come under increasing criticism from dissidents (notably Moroz) and the Ukrainian public, who viewed them as too slow and not yielding significant results. The committee had its roots in public committees established for the legal defence of Angela Davis, an American civil rights activist whose case was popular in the Soviet Union because she was a Communist. Chornovil believed that by delivering information on the case to the United Nations Human Rights Committee Strokata could be freed, and additionally requested the support of Dziuba, Strokata's close friend Leonid Tymchuk, Moscow-based activists Pyotr Yakir and Lyudmila Alexeyeva, and Zynoviia Franko, granddaughter of the writer Ivan Franko.

Several dissidents, including Dziuba and Franko, refused to take part in the committee. These refusals impacted Chornovil, particularly that of Franko, whose familial ties he believed could help protect the committee from being attacked by the Soviet government. Tymchuk ultimately joined, as did Vasyl Stus. The group based its reasoning on the Soviet constitution, the Universal Declaration of Human Rights, and the International Covenant on Civil and Political Rights. The committee's publications included, in a first for Soviet activists, the addresses of its members, where submissions for materials on Strokata's behalf were to be sent. It was the first human rights organisation in Ukraine's history, but it would be destroyed the next year after all but one of its members (Tymchuk) were arrested.

=== Life in Russia (1972–1985) ===
==== Ukrainian Herald trial ====
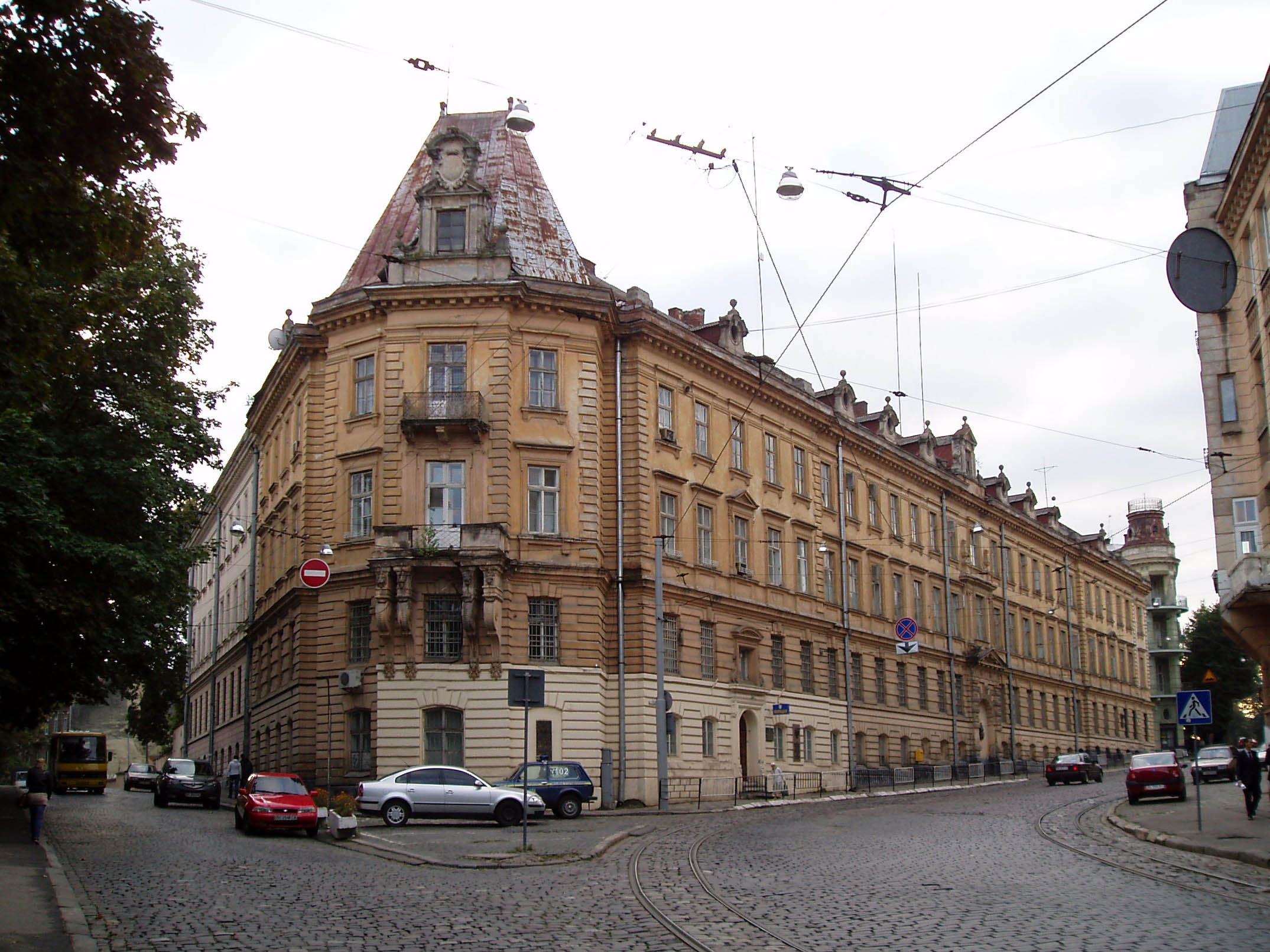
The Prison on Łącki Street, where Chornovil was held in pre-trial detention after his 1972 arrest

Another wide-reaching crackdown on Ukrainian intelligentsia began in January 1972, sparked by the arrest of the Belgian-Ukrainian Yaroslav Dobosh, an Organisation of Ukrainian Nationalists member tasked with smuggling samvydav out of the Soviet Union. Chornovil was arrested on 12 January following a Vertep celebration at the Lviv flat of Olena Antoniv. He was charged under articles 62 (anti-Soviet agitation) and 187-1 (slander against the Soviet Union) of the Criminal Code of the Ukrainian SSR. The Vertep ceremony had been organised as a protest against Soviet cultural and religious policy, additionally serving as a fundraising effort for The Ukrainian Herald and for political prisoners and their families. It raised 250 rubles (equivalent to 251,000 Russian rubles in 2023), which were used to assist those who had been arrested during the crackdown instead. Chornovil was imprisoned at the KGB pre-trial detention centre in Lviv, alongside Iryna Kalynets, Ivan Gel, Stefaniia Shabatura, Mykhaylo Osadchy and Yaroslav Dashkevych.

Chornovil's trial took place behind closed doors. Prosecutors argued that Chornovil was responsible for the content of The Ukrainian Herald, which allegation he denied. During the investigation, other dissident activists refused to give evidence of Chornovil's role in the paper; the government relied on guesses from other individuals, such as Zynoviia Franko, for its arguments. Chornovil likewise refused to give evidence against fellow dissidents or cooperate with investigators. During interrogations, he communicated his belief that the trial was illegal and unrelated to that of other dissidents and alleged that the authorities were preparing "a massacre" against him, using all means at their disposal. He was interrogated more than one hundred times during his trial. The prosecutors resorted to blackmail, threatening his relatives with arrest and bodily harm, but this effort backfired and Chornovil refused to be interrogated.

Chornovil's employment of several different conflicting forms of writing and spelling formed a significant part of his defence, and he used it to argue that he had been blamed without linguistic analysis of the text. Despite Chornovil's arguments, the KGB did uncover evidence that implicated Chornovil in launching the newspaper and coordinating its smuggling with the apparent aim of thwarting the investigation; but failed to conclusively prove that Chornovil was the editor-in-chief. Chornovil's cell was bugged so the security service also learned that he intended to declare a hunger strike if sent into exile outside of Ukraine, and that he desired to be allowed to leave the Soviet Union for Yugoslavia.

The sentence given at the conclusion of Chornovil's trial has been disputed; Amnesty International stated in 1977 that he had been sentenced to seven years' imprisonment and five years' exile; The New York Times in March 1973 claimed that he had been subject to twelve years' imprisonment and exile, without differentiating between the two; The Encyclopedia of Ukraine in 2015 asserted that he received a term of six years' imprisonment and three years' internal exile, which historians Bohdan Paska and Oleh Bazhan similarly professed. According to Bazhan, Chornovil was sentenced on 8 April 1973 by the Lviv Oblast Court, though Chornovil recollected in 1974 that he had been sentenced on 12 April. Chornovil made three appeals to higher courts regarding his case; the first two were rejected, while the third was formally accepted in part – although no changes were made to Chornovil's sentence.

==== Imprisonment in Mordovia (1972–1978) ====
After his conviction, Chornovil was sent to a corrective labour colony in the Mordovian Autonomous Soviet Socialist Republic. From 1973 to 1978 he was variously imprisoned at two camps; ZhKh-385/17-A (Note: Also known as Camp 17-A or simply Camp 17. Located in Ozerny, Zubovo-Polyansky District.) and ZhKh-385/3. (Note: Also known as Camp 19. Located in Barashevo, Tengushevsky District.) Despite his imprisonment, Chornovil continued to actively lead prisoners' protests, leading him to be nicknamed "General of the zeks" by author and dissident Mikhail Kheifets. He was separated from other prisoners and placed under increased surveillance (Note: Chornovil was placed in a chamber-type cell (Russian: Помещение камерного типа, romanised: Pomeshcheniye kamernogo tipa), a penal regime in the Soviet Union and its successor states harsher than typical imprisonment but less restrictive than solitary confinement.) after refusing to obey any of the rules which prisoners were meant to follow. B. Azernikov and L. Kaminskyi, two refuseniks who were imprisoned at the same camp as Chornovil, also described him as having "great authority among all political prisoners", and wrote an open letter to global society urging his release after they left the Soviet Union in 1975.

Chornovil's activities continued to draw international attention during his imprisonment. He was recognised as a prisoner of conscience by human rights group Amnesty International, and awarded the Nicholas Tomalin Prize for Journalism, recognising writers whose freedom of expression is threatened, in 1975. Around this time, Chornovil also began to smuggle his writings out of prison, and used the opportunity as a means to continue to demonstrate Soviet human rights abuses. He wrote a letter to U.S. President Gerald Ford urging him to match the policy of détente with increased attention towards human rights in the Soviet Union, alleging that the Soviet authorities had used détente as a means by which to suppress dissident voices. He further urged him to support the Jackson–Vanik amendment, which sanctioned the Soviet Union in an effort to allow for freedom of migration from the country. Alongside Boris Penson, he wrote the samvydav booklet "Daily Life in the Mordovian Camps", which was smuggled to Jerusalem and published in Russian before being translated into Ukrainian in the Munich-based Suchasnist journal the next year.

The Helsinki Accords were signed between 30 July and 1 August 1975. The signatory nations comprised all of Europe (aside from Albania), the Soviet Union, the United States, and Canada. In the Soviet Union, the Helsinki Accords were seen as marking a new beginning for dissidents, who found that they had a means to reveal Soviet human rights abuses. Mykola Rudenko, a dissident in Kyiv, declared the formation of the Ukrainian Helsinki Group (UHG) on 9 November 1975 for that purpose. Chornovil was imprisoned at the time of the group's founding and would not join until 1979.

Along with Moroz and other political prisoners, Chornovil's resistance activities continued after the establishment of the UHG. The duo took part in a 12 January 1977 hunger strike in which they called for an end to persecution on the basis of their non-conformist viewpoints. At this time, however, a split was forming among Ukrainian political prisoners over whether it was better to actively resist the Soviet prison system (as represented by Moroz, Karavanskyi and Ivan Gel) and those who favoured self-preservation above all else (as represented by refusenik Eduard Kuznetsov, Oleksii Murzhenko and Danylo Shumuk). With influence from the KGB, the two factions began to clash openly. Chornovil, imprisoned in a different camp from Moroz and Shumuk, refused to take a side in the conflict and served as a mediator. In early 1977, during a meeting with Shumuk at a hospital, Chornovil accused the former of artificially intensifying his conflict with Moroz, and compared letters by Shumuk to Canadian family members (in which he disparaged Moroz) as being equivalent to police complaints. Following his release from prison, Chornovil accused Shumuk and Moroz of being equally responsible for the feud as a result of their egocentric attitudes.

==== Return to Yakutia (1978–1980) ====
Chornovil was released from prison and again sent to Chappanda in early 1978. There, he continued to write about the status of political prisoners and human rights within the Soviet Union. He also continued to get involved in the conflict between Moroz and Shumuk; in a letter to Moroz's wife Raisa, he called for a public "boycott" of Shumuk, while arguing that Moroz was being inflexible. Moroz's nine-year imprisonment had seriously impacted his mental and emotional state; Chornovil characterised him as self-aggrandising and narcissistic. During his exile, Chornovil's friendship with Moroz came to an end as the former sought to distance himself from the latter, owing to the conflict with Shumuk.

During his exile, Chornovil continued to send letters to the Soviet authorities. In a 10 April 1978 letter to the Procurator General of the Soviet Union, he criticised the fact that the theoretically wide-reaching rights granted by the Soviet constitution were absent in reality, asking "Why do Soviet laws exist?". He also wrote a samvydav pamphlet, entitled "Only One Year", and was admitted to PEN International that year. At the time, he was working as a labourer on a sovkhoz farm in Nyurba, where he had been sent in October 1979. As previously, much of Chornovil's samvydav works served to illustrate human rights abuses and the conditions faced by prisoners of conscience.

Chornovil joined the Ukrainian Helsinki Group from exile on 22 May 1979. From November 1979 to March 1980 he was placed under constant surveillance by the KGB, which recorded that he established contacts with dissidents Mykhailo Horyn, Oksana Meshko, and Ivan Sokulskyi. He also made contact with several other individuals who wished to establish chapters of the UHG in the oblasts of Ukraine. Unbeknownst to Chornovil, Meshko, at the time leader of the UHG, had also fallen under heavy KGB surveillance, and had ceased to admit individuals in order to prevent their arrests. Zenovii Krasivskyi, a leading UHG member, dispatched Petro Rozumnyi to visit imprisoned and exiled dissidents. Among them was Chornovil, who was asked to replace Meshko as head of the UHG.

==== Wrongful conviction for attempted rape (1980–1985) ====
Chornovil was arrested yet again on 8, 9, or 15 April 1980 on charges of attempted rape. The charges are frequently described in Ukrainian historiography as fabricated, and were likewise referred to as such by the American Time magazine. Several other leading dissidents, including Mykola Horbal, Yaroslav Lesiv, and Yosyf Zisels, received similar bogus accusations around the time. Myroslav Marynovych, a member of the UHG, quoted a KGB officer as saying that "we will not make any more martyrs" by arresting individuals exclusively on political charges. Chornovil's arrest, as well as those of several other dissidents from Ukraine and throughout the Soviet Union, took place amidst a meeting of the Conference on Security and Co-operation in Europe in Madrid, and Time stated that some observers believed the arrests were done to demonstrate Soviet umbrage towards the Helsinki Accords.

Following his arrest, Chornovil declared a hunger strike, characterising his arrest and those of others as contrary to Leninist ideals and an effort to stifle dissent in the leadup to the 1980 Summer Olympics. He was moved to a prison camp in Tabaga, Yakutia, where he was placed into a cell smeared with vomit and faeces. At one point, he was transferred to a "recreation room", where he had no access to water. Lacking strength as a result of his hunger strike, Chornovil crawled on all fours to reach the prison's toilet, which was one storey below his cell and across the prison yard. Several times, he passed out from exhaustion, and was awoken by being doused in water by guards. Chornovil had to interrupt his protest after doctors warned he would not be treated for dysentery he contracted during an epidemic in the camp if he continued refusing food. For this strike, Chornovil was held in solitary confinement from 5 to 21 November 1980. He was found guilty by a closed court in the city of Mirny and sentenced to five years imprisonment.

Chornovil continued to write in prison, including a February 1981 open letter to the 26th Congress of CPSU in which he accused General Secretary Leonid Brezhnev and KGB chairman Yuri Andropov of orchestrating massive purges against the UHG. He also wrote to his wife, urging "no compromises" in dissidents' reactions to the Congress. He wrote another letter on 9 April 1981, this time to the United Nations Human Rights Committee, Amnesty International, the Committee for the Free World, and the Helsinki Committees for Human Rights, urging increased attention towards Soviet persecution of the UHG in formulating their diplomatic policies towards the Soviet Union. Chornovil was released in 1983, but was barred from returning to Ukraine. He remained in the town of Pokrovsk, working as a fire stoker. On 15 April 1985 new General Secretary Mikhail Gorbachev gave Chornovil permission to return to Ukraine as part of perestroika. Chornovil spent a total of 15 years imprisoned by the Soviet government.

=== Return to Ukraine ===
By the time Chornovil returned to Ukraine, the country had changed dramatically. First Secretary of the Communist Party of Ukraine Petro Shelest, a moderate, was removed and replaced by hardliner Volodymyr Shcherbytsky, a member of Brezhnev's Dnipropetrovsk Mafia. Shcherbytsky dramatically escalated Russification policies and a crackdown on Ukrainian culture. Partially as a result of Shcherbytsky's policies, by the time of Brezhnev's death in 1982, fewer books had been published in Ukrainian under Brezhnev's leadership than during the rule of Joseph Stalin. This decline in Ukrainian culture, along with the government's slow response to the 1986 Chernobyl disaster, soured public opinion and led Chornovil (alongside other Ukrainian dissidents) to begin building a unified front against communist rule.

Despite Gorbachev's reforms, the Soviet government continued to intervene against Chornovil and other dissidents. 1987 saw the state launch a smear campaign against Chornovil, in part due to internal dissent over Shcherbytsky's Russification efforts and in part due to pressure from Moscow. The Ukrainian Herald, which relaunched in August 1987 and published essays from prominent opposition-minded intellectuals, attracted state-backed accusations of being supported by "foreign subversive security agencies". Around the same time, Chornovil gave an interview to The Ukrainian Weekly, a Ukrainian diaspora newspaper, in which he freely articulated the dissident movement's attitude towards religion and Ukrainian culture. The government broadcast clips from the conversation on television in an attempt to tarnish Chornovil's image and that of the dissident movement, but the effort backfired. Martha Kolomiyets, the journalist who spoke to Chornovil, was later arrested as an "American saboteur", but by then the interview had already been widely publicised and shared. In December, Shcherbytsky's office made a press release that promised increased KGB surveillance of the opposition, particularly of Chornovil, which saw a new wave of attacks both from print and broadcast media. In an op-ed published in Lviv-based Free Ukraine newspaper, Chornovil was harshly critical of the measures and said that the treatment of himself and Mykhailo Horyn was comparable to that of Aleksandr Solzhenitsyn 15 years prior.

Human rights activities continued to be a significant focus for Chornovil's efforts following his release. Chornovil and Horyn joined Vasyl Barladianu, Gel, Zorian Popadiuk, and Stepan Khmara in advocating for the removal of anti-Soviet agitation from the criminal code and the release and rehabilitation of all political prisoners. On 24 February 1987, he travelled to the Lubyanka Building, the KGB's Moscow headquarters, where he repeated these demands and urged to return seized property. While at Lubyanka, he announced that, in response to official celebrations of the 1000th anniversary of the Christianization of Rus' (1988), the dissident movement would launch a campaign to reverse the decision of the 1946 Synod of Lviv that merged the Ukrainian Greek Catholic Church into the Russian Orthodox Church. However, the government interfered with his freedom of assembly — for example, Chornovil was blocked from attending a planned December 1987 seminar on the rights of non-Russian nations within the Soviet Union by being called to a "preventive" interview in Lviv, where he was warned against involvement in "anti-social" activities.

On 11 March 1988, Chornovil formally re-established the Ukrainian Helsinki Group in a letter co-signed by Horyn and Krasivskyi, although the group had already resumed activity in the summer of the previous year and Chornovil's Herald was its press organ. By this time, several independent organisations existed, such as the Lion's Society, Spadshchyna, and the Ukrainian Culturological Club. The fragmented nature of the dissident movement (now under the label of National Democracy) led Chornovil to begin bringing the organisations together into one structure in April 1988.

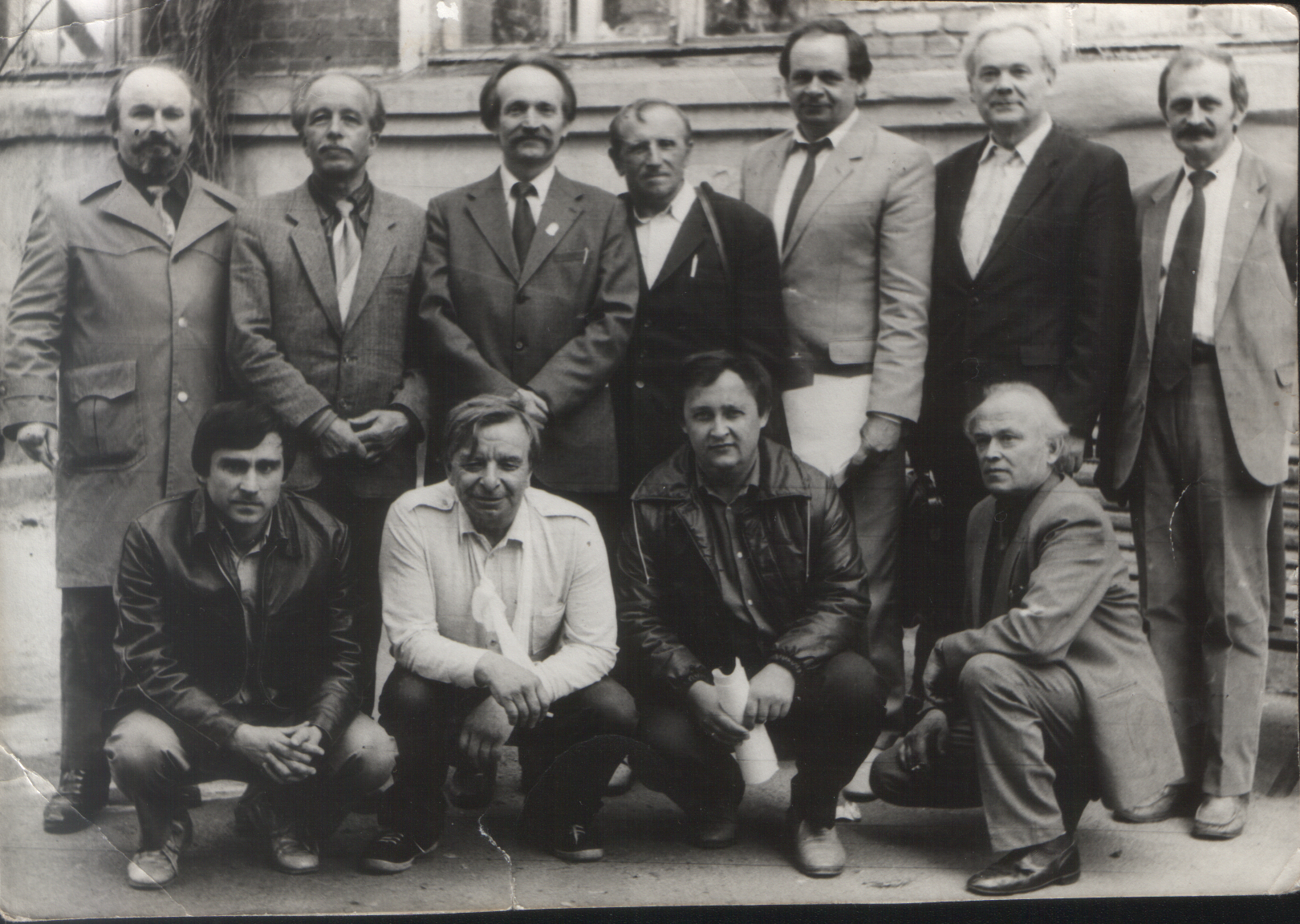
Chornovil with members of the Donetsk branch of Ukrainian Helsinki Union, 1989

Chornovil created the Ukrainian Helsinki Union (Ukrainian: Українська Гельсінська спілка, romanised: Ukrainska Helsinska spilka, abbreviated UHS) on 7 June 1988. It was the first independent political party in Soviet Ukraine. Chornovil co-authored and presented the party's platform, which called for Ukrainian independence within a confederate framework of Soviet states. The manifesto argued that Ukrainian independence would benefit Ukrainians and non-Ukrainians alike, but added the point about confederation to prevent the UHS from being banned as separatist.

Chornovil's activities during this time period were not limited to Ukraine; he maintained extensive contacts with other dissidents, particularly those from the Baltic states, Armenia, and Georgia. A 8 September 1988 internal notice of the Ukrainian KGB informed operatives that an organisation known as the International Committee for the Protection of Political Prisoners. The committee was established by Chornovil and Armenian dissident Paruyr Hayrikyan in January 1988, and was actively involved in efforts to repeal anti-Soviet agitation legislation, to close prison camps and psychiatric hospitals (which have been used to stifle dissent), and to solidify cooperation between the nationalist movements of Ukraine and other countries within the Soviet Union. On 24–25 September, Chornovil (along with Oles Shevchenko and Khmara) represented the UHS at a conference of dissident groups in Riga. Chornovil wrote the conference's concluding statement, urging all "National Democratic movements" to make a united front and resist under the "For our freedom and yours!" banner.

==== Revolution ====
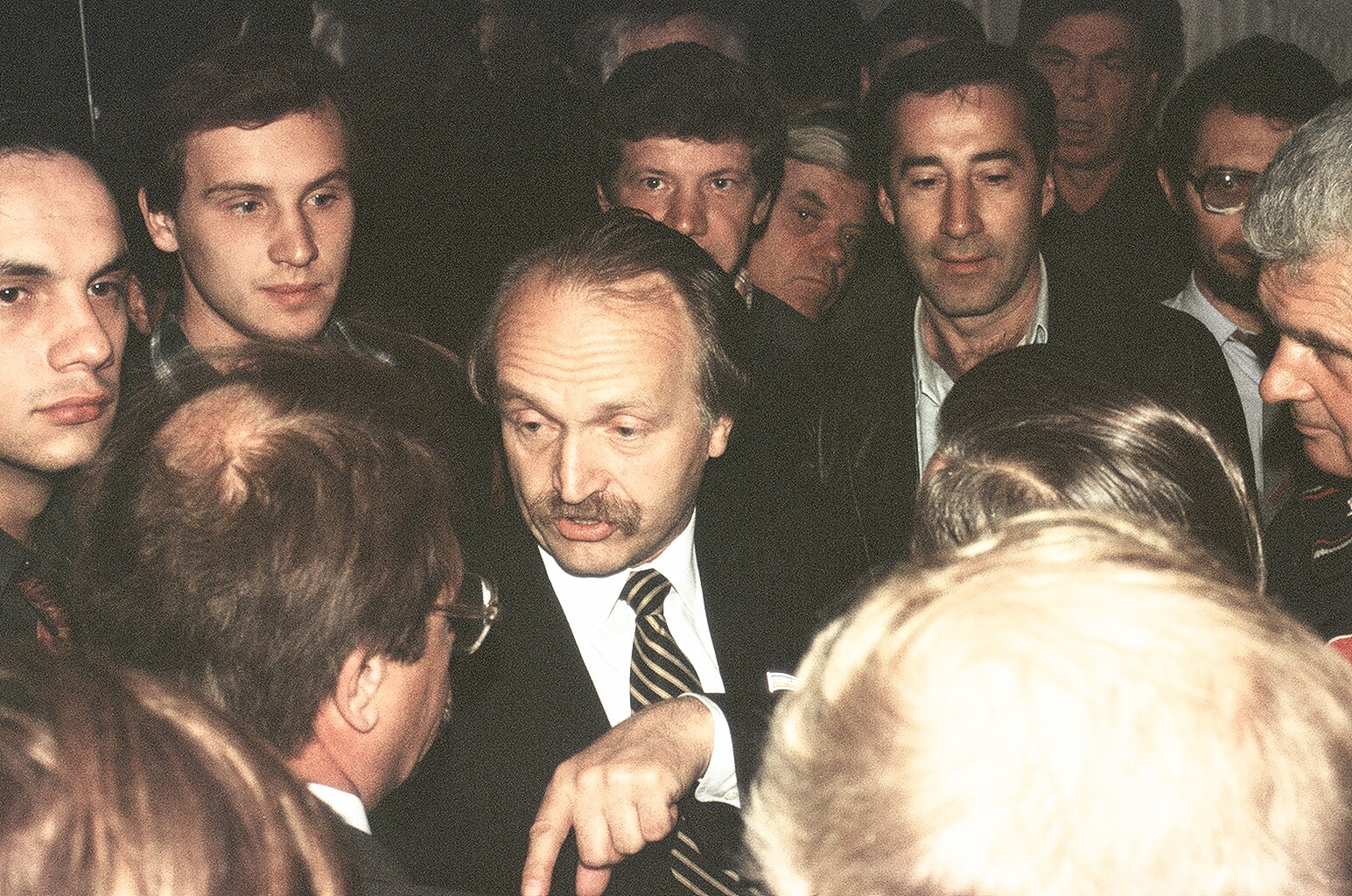
Chornovil at a Makiivka mine meeting with striking workers, c. 1990s

The Revolutions of 1989 sweeping Central and Eastern Europe throughout 1988 and 1989 greatly interested Chornovil, particularly in their adherence to non-violence. Their success would lead Chornovil to abandon his public support for Marxism–Leninism in favour of anti-communism, which he had supported in private since the mid-1960s but avoided publicly stating in an effort to appear as a moderate. Other Ukrainian intellectuals, too, began to back anti-communism, and the Writers' Union of Ukraine began to develop a popular front in late 1988, justifying it as encouraging the populace to become more active in local government and take a greater interest in economic concerns. Chornovil additionally supported the spread of Memorial, a human rights movement in the Soviet Union, to Ukraine, writing a positive letter to the presidium of the group's Ukrainian chapter upon its founding in March 1989.

On 18 July 1989, a union-wide wave of mining strikes reached the coal miners in the city of Makiivka, in the Donbas region of eastern Ukraine. The employees first demanded improved worker conditions, better wages and increased social protections. From the outset, however, several Donbas miners had also viewed the Ukrainian independence movement with sympathy as a potential path to self-governance. Chornovil supported the strikes from their early days, issuing a statement saying, among other things, that the walkout "tore down the veil of party demagoguery regarding the unity of the party and the people", which the Communists claimed was being attacked by various "extremists" there. Shcherbytsky, on the other hand, was not happy and cracked down on the strikers by denigrating them in government-controlled media and cutting off communications for strike committees. This radicalised the miners, who soon began to call for Shcherbytsky's resignation.

As the election to the Supreme Soviet of Ukraine, scheduled for March 1990, came closer, Chornovil switched to campaign mode. His manifesto called for "statehood, democracy, and self-government" and cooperation with non-ethnic Ukrainians. The cornerstone of Chornovil's programme was his idea of a federal Ukraine based on twelve "lands" (Ukrainian: землі, romanised: zemli), roughly defined by the governorates of the Ukrainian People's Republic plus a separate land for the Donbas. Crimea was to exist as either an independent state or an autonomous republic of Ukraine. The legislature was to be re-established as a bicameral Central Rada, the lower house elected by proportional representation and the upper house from the lands. Chornovil believed that federalism would allow for Ukraine and its regions to develop economies, culture and politics independent of the Soviet Union and prevent the establishment of Soviet-style bureaucracy. Chornovil was one of the primary individuals pushing for the adoption of pro-independence positions within the UHS at this time, proposing that the question of independence be proposed in the party's programme.

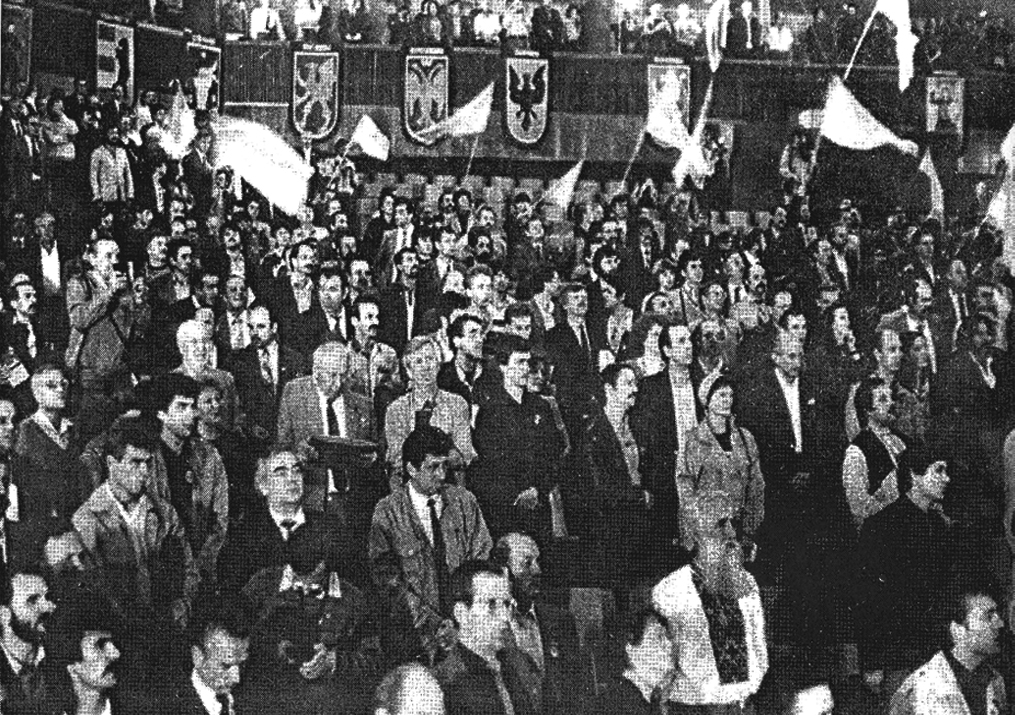
The First Congress of Rukh took place in September 1989

On 8 September 1989, the People's Movement of Ukraine (Ukrainian: Народний рух України, romanised: Narodnyi rukh Ukrainy, abbreviated as 'Rukh') was established with a programme advocating for the establishment of Ukrainian as the state language of the Ukrainian SSR, a national and cultural revival, and Ukrainian self-government, as well as the strengthening of linguistic rights for minorities within Ukraine. These positions were based on those of the Writers' Union, which had adopted them in February of that year. Fully named as the "People's Movement of Ukraine for Perestroika", its first leader was poet Ivan Drach. Despite this, however, Chornovil was the de facto leader of the party and organised its establishment, according to historian Roman Hrytskiv. Chornovil sought to transform Rukh into a mass movement of Ukrainian nationalists, reuniting radical and moderate supporters of independence. Coincidentally, Shcherbytsky was forced to resign the same month, a combination of pressure from the miners' strikes and from Gorbachev, whose reforms were at odds with Shcherbytsky's status as one of the few remaining conservatives to hold high office.

Chornovil played a significant role in organising a 22 January 1990 human chain from Lviv to Kyiv, commemorating the anniversary of the 1919 Unification Act. Around three million people participated in the chain in what was at that point the largest protest undertaken by Rukh. Chornovil advocated Unification Act's anniversary to be recognised as a holiday.

== Chornovil in power ==
Official portraits of Chornovil, Verkhovna Rada (Note: Supreme Soviet until 1991.)

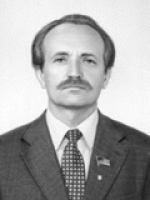
1st (1990–1994)

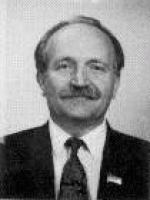
2nd (1994–1998)

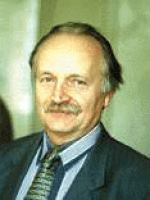
3rd (1998–1999)

The Supreme Soviet election, the first multi-party vote in Soviet Ukraine's history, was held on 4 March 1990. It was marked by high turnout, with 85% of registered voters participating. In most of Ukraine, the result was beneficial for the communists, with 90% of previously elected deputies being re-elected and 373 of 450 deputies belonging to the Communist Party. In all three Galician oblasts, (Note: Lviv Oblast, Ivano-Frankivsk Oblast and Ternopil Oblast.) however, the Democratic Bloc, a Rukh-led coalition, won the majority of seats. Ivan Plyushch, who was elected as Deputy Chairman of the Supreme Soviet, wrote in 2010 that the Communist majority was unable to command the same influence at a parliamentary level as the Democratic Bloc was. Chornovil was elected as a Democratic Bloc deputy from the city of Lviv's Shevchenkivskyi District by an absolute majority, winning 68.60% of all votes against seven other candidates. Within the Supreme Soviet, Chornovil was among the leaders of the Democratic Bloc's radical wing.

Chornovil was also elected Chairman of the Lviv Oblast Council in April 1990, making him the first non-communist head of government of Lviv Oblast. He quickly adapted from life as a dissident to politics, moving to the right and becoming one of the first Ukrainian politicians to explicitly endorse an anti-communist revolution. In the economic sector, he privatised the housing market and light industry, and launched land reforms by abolishing collective farms and redistributing the lands to peasants. Socially, he actively supported Ukraine's cultural and national revival; Ukrainian, rather than Soviet symbols were used by his government, soldiers of the Ukrainian Insurgent Army were recognised as veterans, the ban on the Ukrainian Greek Catholic Church imposed by the Synod of Lviv was repealed and religious holidays were recognised as public holidays. Statues of Vladimir Lenin were demolished for the first time under Chornovil's government, with the statue in Chervonohrad (now Sheptytskyi) being toppled on 1 July 1990. This launched a wave of demolitions of Lenin monuments in Galicia throughout 1990 and 1991.

Chornovil's policies were directly at odds with the laws of the Ukrainian SSR and the Soviet Union at the time, and his government was castigated in Ukrainian and Union-wide pro-government media. Despite this, the other Galician oblasts, which had come under the control of Rukh, soon followed Chornovil's example in pursuing reforms. Historian Stepan Kobuta has argued that the rejection of Soviet laws by Galicia was an expression of Chornovil's federalist beliefs. To preserve their democratic gains and counteract Soviet state institutions, Galician national democrats formed the Galician Assembly in February 1991 with Chornovil appointed as its head.

As a deputy of the Supreme Soviet, Chornovil devoted himself to increasing Ukraine's sovereignty within the Soviet Union with the eventual aim of independence, as well as land reform, environmental conservation, minority and religious rights, federalism and the enshrining of Ukrainian as the sole language of government. He was nominated as the Democratic Bloc's candidate for Chairman of the Supreme Soviet, though he refused the nomination and endorsed the coalition's leader, Ihor Yukhnovskyi. Ultimately, neither were elected, as the communists voted for Vladimir Ivashko. During voting, Chornovil openly called for Ukraine's independence from the Soviet Union, arguing it was the only possible way to end what he referred to as the "economic, environmental and spiritual catastrophe" facing Ukraine at the time.

Chornovil continued to advocate for federalism, saying in a May 1990 press conference that "Kyivan centralism" would lead to the emergence of Russian nationalism in the Donbas and a Rusyn identity in Zakarpattia Oblast. The same month, as conflicts between rural Greek Catholics and Orthodox Christians broke out, the government of Lviv Oblast experimented with holding referendums in villages to determine which denomination would be given control of churches. According to this proposal, authored by Chornovil, the majority sect would carry responsibility for building a church belonging to the minority's faith. This system successfully prevented a religious conflict from emerging in the region.

On 12 June 1990, Russia declared sovereignty within the Soviet Union. This gave a boost to efforts by the Democratic Bloc to push for voting on the Declaration of State Sovereignty of Ukraine, which had been blocked by communist deputies. During a 5 July debate on the declaration, Chornovil and fellow coalition member Mykhailo Batih accused the communists of being told how to vote by the Party. Chornovil subsequently revealed that several deputies had received instructions to amend the draft law on sovereignty in order to strip it of measures such as the establishment of an independent military or legal system. This revelation led acting Supreme Soviet chairman Ivan Plyushch to launch an investigation, which intensified after it was discovered that several deputies had quoted the instructions word-for-word.

Chornovil and an unknown communist deputy then attempted to begin a vote on the declaration. Plyushch refused, noting that members of the Congress of People's Deputies of the Soviet Union had not yet returned and that quorum was therefore impossible. In response, Chornovil moved to demand the immediate return of Soviet People's Deputies, which was then endorsed by pro-sovereignty communists and passed by a wide margin. Four days later, the deputies returned and debate on the Declaration of State Sovereignty resumed. The anti-declaration group was led by Stanislav Hurenko and Leonid Kravchuk, who claimed that the matter of sovereignty would be resolved in Moscow rather than Kyiv.

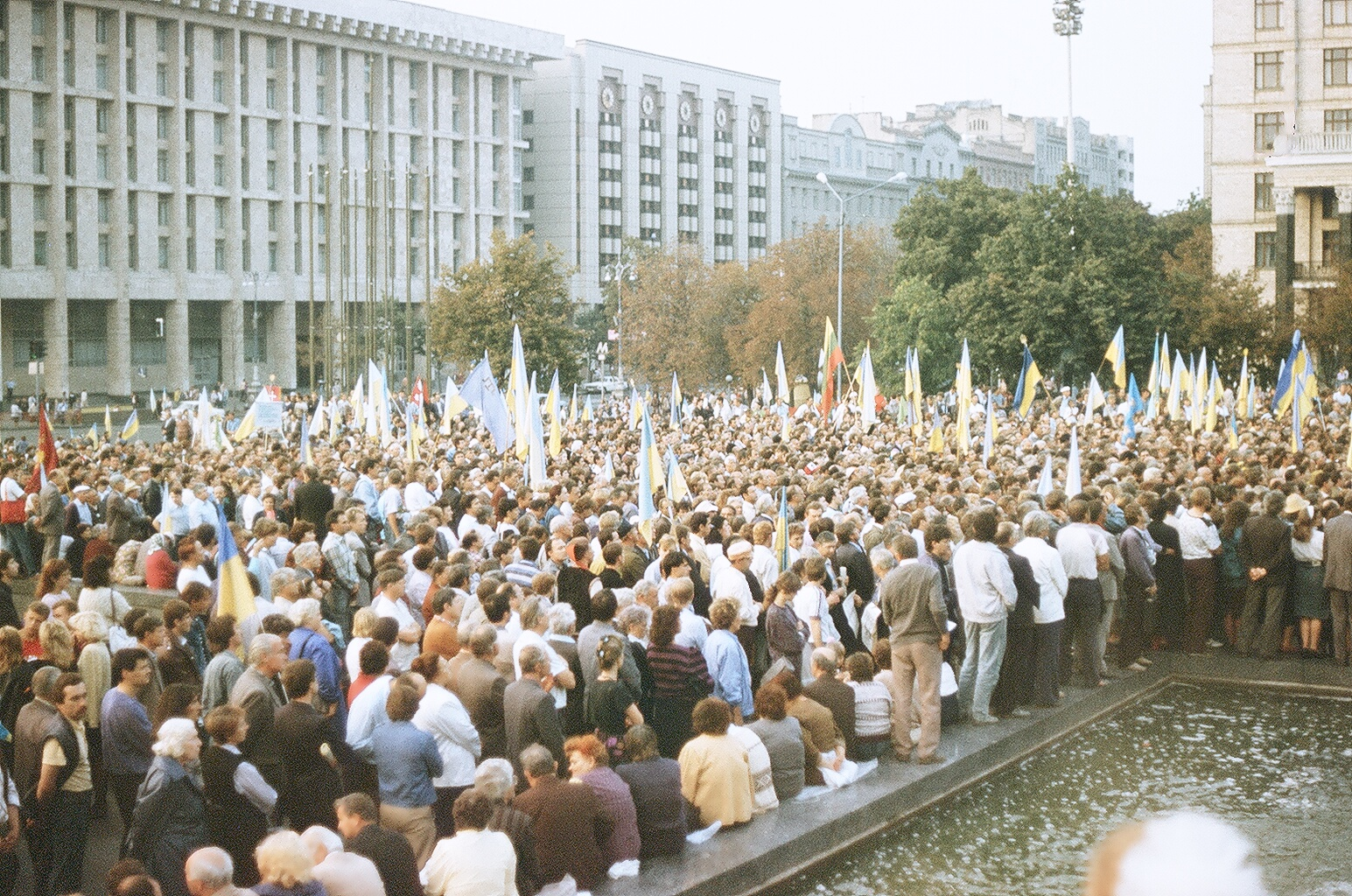
Demonstration in support of the Declaration of Sovereignty of Ukraine in central Kyiv, July 1990

Ivashko formally resigned from his Ukrainian government positions on 11 July to become deputy General Secretary of the Communist Party of the Soviet Union. This move came as a shock to the Ukrainian public, as the CPSU was perceived as collapsing, and Ivashko's resignation from Ukrainian positions to serve the party demonstrated apathy towards the Ukrainian population. Following Ivashko's resignation, the communists were left demoralised, allowing Chornovil to push the declaration through office. It was eventually passed on 16 July 1990, giving precedence to Ukrainian laws over the laws of the Soviet government. This was a major victory for Chornovil, who had privately sought a declaration of state sovereignty since July 1989.

Ukrainian public sentiment continued to turn against the government through the remainder of 1990. A series of student protests, known as the Revolution on Granite, began in October after groups of students claimed that the government had manipulated the results in order to prevent the Democratic Bloc from achieving a majority. The students launched a hunger strike on October Revolution Square in Kyiv (now Maidan Nezalezhnosti), and were subsequently mocked by communist deputies. This insensitive attitude led almost all moderates and national communists to abandon the Communist Party, following the lead of writer Oles Honchar. These individuals defected to the National-Democrats, further weakening the remaining communists.

The January Events, in which the Soviet government deployed the military on 16 January 1991 in an attempt to prevent Lithuania from becoming independent, led Chornovil to temporarily reorient his policies towards the establishment of a Ukrainian military separate from the Soviet Army. In order to achieve this, he co-founded the Military Collegium of Rukh alongside Ihor Derkach, Mykola Porovskyi, Vitalii Lazorkin and Vilen Martyrosian, which was tasked with creating the Armed Forces of Ukraine and preventing the usage of Ukrainian troops in Soviet government crackdowns. Chornovil continued to advocate for integration of the Galician oblasts, particularly in expanding access to education and inter-oblast trade, at the second meeting of the Galician Assembly on 16 February 1991. Chornovil also oversaw a March 1991 independence referendum, in which the vast majority of the population of the Galician oblasts voted for Ukraine to separate from the Soviet Union.

=== Declaration of independence and presidential election ===
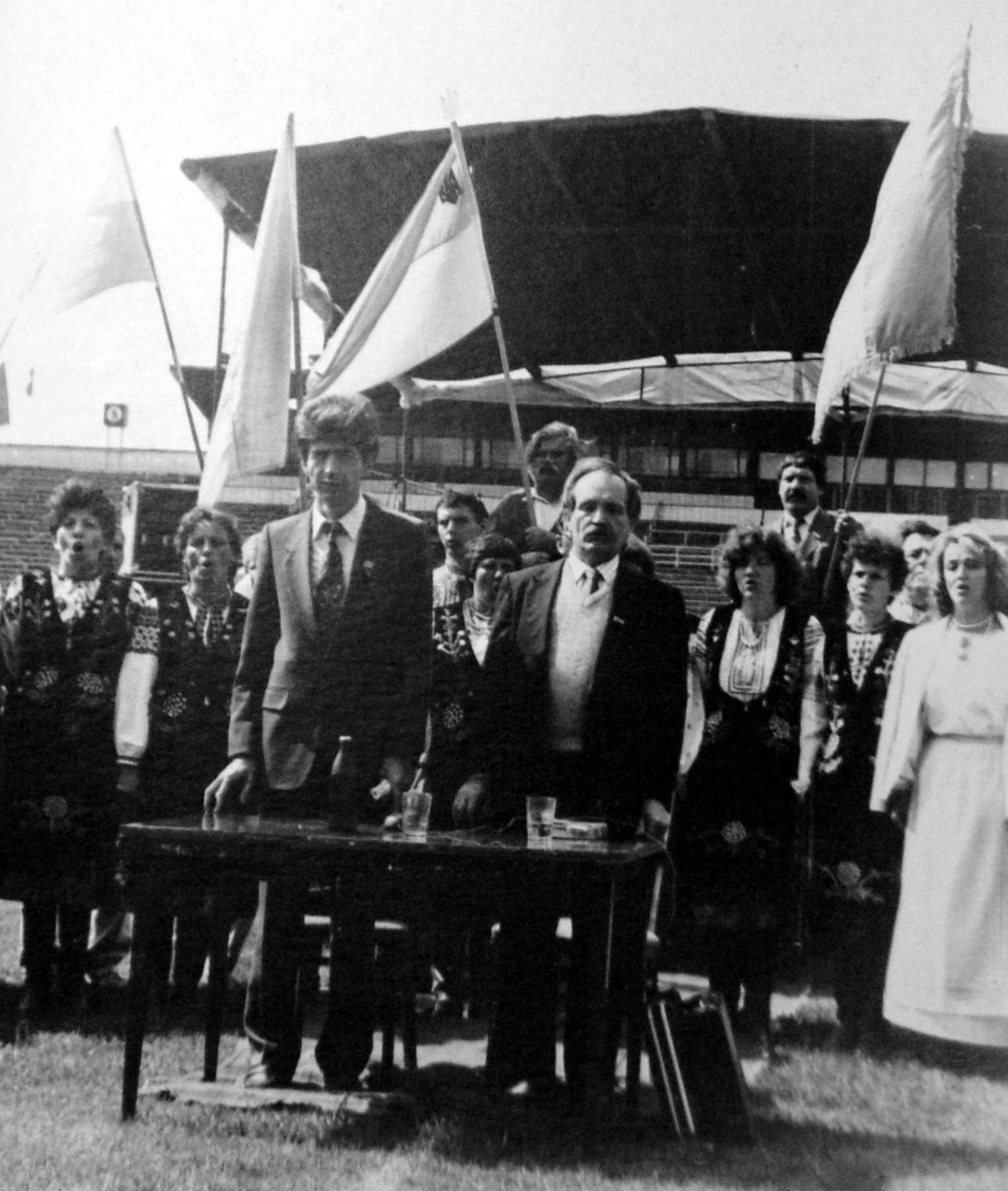
Chornovil in Kryvyi Rih, 1990

The Supreme Soviet passed a law on 5 July 1991 establishing the office of President, with its holder to be determined by election.

Hardliners opposed to Gorbachev's leadership of the Soviet Union launched a coup d'état on 19 August 1991. At the time of the coup, Chornovil was in the city of Zaporizhzhia on a business trip. Upon learning that a putsch had occurred, he immediately returned to Kyiv and began calling for an emergency session of the Supreme Soviet of the Ukrainian SSR; he also banned the Communist Party's activities in Lviv Oblast. In the Supreme Soviet, the deputies of the Democratic Bloc began to advocate for Ukrainian independence, arguing that Ukraine was a part of Europe and not the Soviet Union. Following the failure of the coup, the Supreme Soviet adopted the Declaration of Independence of Ukraine on 24 August 1991.

The campaign for the presidential election officially began on 1 September 1991. The National-Democratic camp was fractious, with three major candidates (Chornovil, Yukhnovskyi and Levko Lukianenko), while Kravchuk was already a well-established figure as the incumbent, if de facto, head of state. The race soon narrowed to an effective two-man campaign with Chornovil against Kravchuk, as they were the only candidates with the necessary organisation to compete at a national scale. In spite of Yukhnovskyi's leadership of the Democratic Bloc, he was unpopular outside of intellectual urban centres and western Ukraine, while Lukianenko, despite being a liked pro-independence figure, lacked an organised campaign and was unknown in most of Ukraine.

Chornovil travelled throughout Ukraine to spread the message of Ukrainian independence, including staunchly pro-Russian regions such as Crimea. Appealing to both Russophone and Ukrainian-language audiences by speaking in both languages, Chornovil argued for a programme in which he would transition from a planned economy to free-market capitalism within a year via a series of decrees and acquiring the attention of Western investors, as well as membership in the European Economic Community and a hypothetical pan-European collective security organisation. Chornovil condemned Kravchuk as "a sly politician" who was "trying to get [Ukraine] back into the [Soviet Union]", warning that he would re-establish political and economic ties with Russia.

Results of the 1991 Ukrainian presidential election. Oblasts won by Chornovil are shown in blue.

Chornovil was initially unpopular due to decades of Soviet propaganda against his beliefs, which Kravchuk had previously directed. The inability of the National-Democrats to nominate a single candidate also contributed to the belief that the dissidents were unfit to rule in the public consciousness. Despite this, Chornovil's campaign gradually began to close the gap outside of Galicia in opinion polling; a poll from November 1991 showed Chornovil with 22% of the vote in Odesa compared to 28% for Kravchuk, with the number of undecided voters growing from a quarter to one-third of the local electorate. Northwestern Ukraine (Khmelnytskyi, Rivne and Volyn oblasts) served as a significant battleground from October, as surveys initially forecasted a practical tie before later giving Chornovil a slight lead.

Ukrainians voted in both the presidential election and a referendum confirming Ukraine's independence on 1 December 1991. 84.18% of the population participated in the referendum, with 90.32% voting in favour. Kravchuk won the presidential election, with 61.59% of the election. Chornovil placed a distant second with 23.27% of the vote, avoiding a runoff. In contrast to the prior predictions of a Chornovil victory in northwestern oblasts, he ultimately only won in Galicia, though he performed well in Chernivtsi, Cherkasy, Kyiv, Rivne, Volyn and Zakarpattia oblasts, as well as the city of Kyiv. Chornovil accepted defeat on election day, saying "The pre-election campaign gave me the opportunity to travel all over Ukraine, to meet the people and to politicise the East." He later stated that another six months of campaigning, rather than the truncated campaign that occurred in 1991, would have allowed for a victory.

=== Independent Ukraine ===
==== Party governance ====
Following the presidential election, fissures developed within Rukh over the future of the group. One faction, led by Drach and Mykhailo Horyn, sought to dissolve the organisation and support Kravchuk's nation-building efforts, while Chornovil and his supporters sought to reformulate the organisation into a party to support Chornovil's future presidential ambitions. Several members threw their support behind Yukhnovskyi or Lukianenko, treating Rukh's endorsement of Chornovil as a mere recommendation, contributing to further intraparty tensions.

At the Third Congress of Rukh on 28 February 1992, a split in the organisation was briefly averted. Drach, Horyn and Chornovil were elected as co-chairs of Rukh as a compromise between the two factions. Nonetheless, the Ukrainian Republican Party and the Democratic Party of Ukraine, which had formed out of Rukh, decided to cooperate with Kravchuk. Ultimately Chornovil's faction prevailed at the Fourth Congress in December 1992 as Rukh was reorganised as a centre-right political party under his leadership.

==== Crimean issue ====
Location of Crimea within the Black Sea

Shortly after the Soviet Union fell apart, Crimea's ethnically-Russian population sought to break away from Ukraine and unify with Russia. On 5 May 1992, Crimea sparked tensions as it unilaterally declared its independence from Ukraine. The flag of Ukraine was replaced with that of Russia, and a wave of repressions against the indigenous Crimean Tatar population began. Chornovil, who had maintained an interest in Crimean Tatars since his imprisonment, called for the Verkhovna Rada (independent Ukraine's successor of the Supreme Soviet) to cancel Crimea's declaration of independence and demand new elections to its parliament. During the crisis that lasted for several years, he was among the hawkish politicians on the issue.

By 1993, Russia waded into the Crimean crisis. Valentin Agafonov, deputy chairman of the Supreme Soviet of Russia, pledged to recognise Crimea if their independence was confirmed by referendum. In June, the city of Sevastopol additionally applied to join the Russian Federation. Leading pro-Russian activist Yuriy Meshkov arranged an army composed of the Soviet Black Sea Fleet and seized control of police and media buildings with supporters. At one point, the Ukrainian government considered selling the nuclear arsenal that it inherited from the Soviet Union in order to alleviate economic pressures, but the threat of secession and Moscow's behaviour led the Ukrainian population to oppose this transaction. Chornovil was among the politicians who supported an independent nuclear arsenal, or alternatively membership in NATO, which he saw as the only possible deterrent to Russian expansionism should Ukraine need to relinquish nuclear weapons. He opposed Ukraine's participation in the Commonwealth of Independent States, though supported the ratification of the 1997 Russian–Ukrainian Friendship Treaty.

Chornovil insisted that war would not occur over Crimea in the immediate term; he believed that within half a year to a year, Crimean separatism would lose popularity and that Russian actions would be limited to financing Crimean separatists and an information warfare campaign against Ukraine. Both of these predictions would eventually prove accurate. However, he also held that the threat of separatism was still real. He believed that it could only be countered by a strategy that would nudge the Russified regions of Ukraine towards a single pan-Ukrainian political, economical and sociocultural environment - which was not acted upon. Chornovil opposed Crimean autonomy as it existed, which he considered artificial as it was based not on recently repatriated Crimean Tatar population but on the Russians who largely arrived after World War II; he also thought that the special status of the peninsula only froze the conflict.

==== Views on the economy ====
Fixing the rapidly deteriorating economy was an extremely serious issue in the first years of independence. The problem stemmed from the government's failure to adapt to changing economic realities within the former Soviet Union and Ukraine's economy being dominated by imports. Hyperinflation began and productivity fell. These political and economic crises led to fears among many deputies that Ukraine would soon lose its independence; Chornovil, on the contrary, believed that securing Ukraine's sovereignty would lead to an improvement in political and economic conditions. He continued to oppose Kravchuk, with whom he continued to maintain an acrimonious rivalry.

Independent trade unions, incensed by the refusal of Kravchuk's government to guarantee workers' benefits and compensation, launched wide-reaching strikes on 2 September 1992. Like the strikes of 1989–1991 the strikers were largely coal miners, but in contrast to the previous strikes they failed to gain wide-reaching support, a fact that Lafayette College professor Stephen Crowley attributes to it having been called by a nation-wide union instead of by local, Donbas-based strike committees. The coal miners were joined by Kyiv's public transportation workers in February 1993, a measure that made the strike deeply unpopular among the public. Unlike in previous walkouts, Rukh condemned the strikers (as did almost all other parties) and called upon the government to "punish the real organisers of the strike". Chornovil in particular argued for the curtailing of political activity, especially strikes, in order to ensure stability.

==== 1994 elections ====
Kravchuk's government dissolved the Verkhovna Rada and called snap parliamentary and presidential elections on 17 June 1993 in a bid to stem the miners' anger. Chornovil initially chose to contest a Kyiv seat in the parliamentary election, as he felt this would establish him as a national figure and give him the opportunity to tour all of Ukraine to spread his ideological vision. His close ally and friend Mykhailo Boichyshyn was nominated by Rukh as the candidate for Lviv's Shevchenkivskyi District. At the time Boichyshyn was Chairman of the Secretariat of Rukh, and one of the party's main advocates for a more economically focused policy.

On 14 or 15 January 1994 Boichyshyn left Rukh's campaign headquarters in Kyiv. Later that evening, he was abducted by armed individuals or two armed men entered the campaign headquarters building demanding to know Boichyshyn's whereabouts. He has not been seen since, and he is believed to be dead. Boichyshyn's enforced disappearance was a watershed moment in Ukraine, being the first in a series of disappearances and murders motivated by politics, according to journalist Andrii Olenin. Following Boichyshyn's disappearance, Rukh would largely abandon an economic programme in favour of focusing on social policy and human rights. At the time of Boichyshyn's abduction, Chornovil was campaigning in the southern Mykolaiv Oblast, and the two had spoken by phone shortly before Boichyshyn was "disappeared". Boichyshyn's disappearance had a significant effect on Chornovil. He later chose to instead contest the 357th electoral district (located in Ternopil Oblast) rather than a seat in Kyiv, and he was successfully elected with 62.5% of the vote against 14 opponents.

The results of the parliamentary election boded poorly for Kravchuk's chances in the presidential election: 75% of the population turned out to vote, far exceeding expectations of low turnout and apathy. A split developed between eastern Ukraine, which elected candidates of the newly reestablished Communist Party of Ukraine, and central and western Ukraine, where Rukh performed particularly well. The New York Times noted after the election that Chornovil was regarded as an expected competitor to Kravchuk, alongside former Prime Minister Leonid Kuchma and Ivan Plyushch, who both won by significant margins after being established as potential opponents of Kravchuk. In the aftermath of the election, Kravchuk argued in a 25 March 1994 address that the presidential election, scheduled for June 1994, would need to be cancelled and petitioned the Verkhovna Rada to grant him emergency powers to undertake economic reforms and fight organised crime.

120 deputies, largely belonging to the national-democratic opposition, lent their support to Kravchuk in his efforts to cancel the elections and obtain greater powers. Rukh gave a reluctant endorsement of Kravchuk's call to postpone the elections under the justification that not doing so without reform of electoral laws would lead to a political crisis, though Chornovil refused to back an expansion of his powers and argued that he would use it to empower former communist officials and agree to hand over both nuclear weapons and the Black Sea Fleet (the ownership of which was disputed) to Russia. Chornovil argued that to expand presidential powers would lead to the emergence of "a quiet dictatorship of the oligarchy". Ultimately, neither proposal was passed as communists took control of the Verkhovna Rada's leadership following the election and blocked any efforts to postpone or cancel the election.

In spite of his electoral success in the parliamentary election, Chornovil decided not to run in the 1994 presidential election and instead endorsed economist Volodymyr Lanovyi, who had been removed from the government by Kravchuk after proposing reforms to end the economic crisis. Journalist and Rukh associate Taras Zdorovylo has claimed that it is possible this decision was taken out of fear for his life and the future of Rukh; according to Zdorovylo, Chornovil used his connections from his time in prison to secretly meet with leading Ukrainian mafia figures, who denied responsibility and claimed that the government had ordered Boichyshyn's abduction. This allegation was repeated by Dmytro Ponomarchuk, press secretary of Rukh, in 2013. Zdorovylo also states that Kravchuk's government launched a politically motivated investigation into the finances of Rukh during the election and placed both Chornovil and high-ranking party member Oleksandr Lavrynovych under a security escort, which monitored their conversations.

==== Second parliamentary term ====
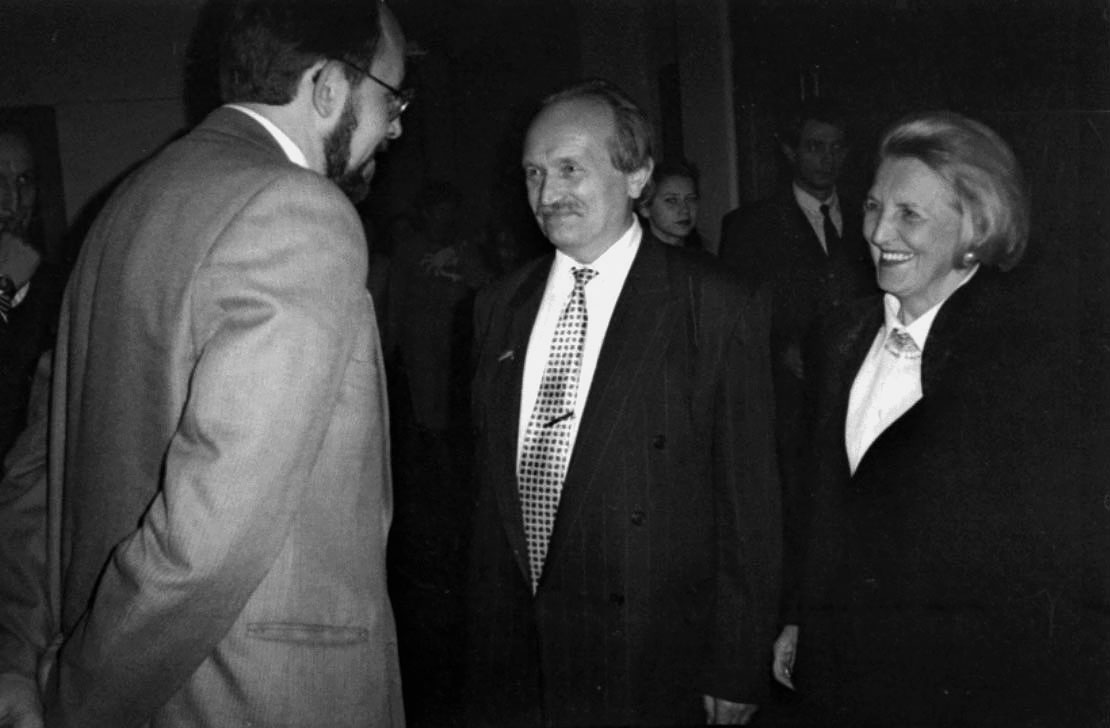
Chornovil and his wife Atena Pashko during a visit to the Kyiv House of Cinema, October 1995

Leonid Kuchma defeated Kravchuk in the election, becoming the second President of Ukraine. Kuchma's subsequent crackdown on independent media caused Chornovil to become one of the foremost critics of his government. Though power transitioned from one individual to another as a result of Kuchma's victory, the political situation did not significantly change; the country remained controlled by the post-communist nomenklatura, which Chornovil would refer to as a "party of power" in 1996, and an emerging class of industrial oligarchs associated with them. Chornovil was a critic of the oligarchs, blaming them for non-payment of salaries to soldiers, doctors and teachers, low funding for culture and sciences, and the poor quality of television programming. He accused the oligarchs of seeking to create a nonpartisan system within a "non-Ukrainian Ukraine", with power instead being vested in a cosmopolitan financial elite.

The process of drafting and ratifying a constitution for independent Ukraine began in 1995. Chornovil, like much of the rest of Ukraine's right-wing and centrist politicians, found himself aligned with Kuchma as the parliamentary left pushed for constitutional articles forbidding the sale and purchase of land and the preservation of Soviet-era local government bodies. Chornovil indicated on 25 March 1995 that he backed Kuchma's proposed constitution, though journalist Yurii Lukanov says that he expressed that Rukh had "eleven serious objections" to its adoption.

Kuchma's proposed constitution was characterised by Oleksandr Moroz (leader of the Socialist Party and then-Chairman of the Verkhovna Rada, unrelated to dissident Valentyn Moroz) as creating an overly-centralised state with strong powers for the executive and lacking an independent judiciary. He at first rejected Kuchma's constitution, saying in March that "such an undemocratic constitution does not exist anywhere in Europe". In June of that year, however, Moroz created a second constitutional draft along with Kuchma and 38 other individuals as part of a "Constitutional Commission". This draft was in turn rejected by the right and centre for the same reasons that Moroz had rejected the first draft. On 24 November, Chornovil wrote in Chas-Time newspaper (he was its editor-in-chief since January 1995) that the draft was "anti-parliamentary" and accusing the drafters of seeking to obstruct the Verkhovna Rada. A constitution was eventually adopted on 28 June 1996, though several provisions supported by Rukh, such as private property rights, the affirmation of Ukraine as a unitary state and the right of the Ukrainian people to self-determination, were not adopted.

Aside from the constitution, Chornovil began working as president of the Vasyl Symonenko International Human Rights Foundation in 1994. He was also appointed as among the first Ukrainian delegates to the Parliamentary Assembly of the Council of Europe the same year, and along with the Ukrainian Red Cross Society organised the donation of 50 tonnes of humanitarian aid to Chechen civilians during the First Chechen War. Newspaper Gazeta.ua wrote in 2017 that Chornovil was one of the supporters of the Ukrainian Orthodox Church – Kyiv Patriarchate during the funeral of Patriarch Volodymyr, who he had been imprisoned alongside, as protesters attempted to bury him in Saint Sophia Cathedral, though the Ukrainian Institute of National Memory indicates that he instead sought to continue the burial. Chornovil praised Kuchma on a number of occasions during the early years of his presidency for his appointment of National-Democrats to governmental positions. Chornovil also paid a visit to Odesa from 14 to 16 September 1994, where he hosted a conference at the Odesa National Polytechnic University on Rukh's politics and historical role. Chornovil's speech at the Odesa Polytechnic advocated for the strengthening of democratic norms and the creation of a middle class via economic reforms. At the same time, he continued his critique of the emerging oligarchy.

In 1997, Chornovil escalated his feud with Moroz, condemning his speeches as "primitive populism" and blaming him for the escalation of political polarisation in Ukraine. Chornovil also increasingly advocated for Ukrainian integration with other Central and Eastern European states, calling for the establishment of a "Baltic-Black Sea Union", or Mizhmoria (Ukrainian: Міжмор'я, lit. 'Intermarium') along with Belarusian dissident Zianon Pazniak. He additionally advocated for the demilitarisation of the Black Sea (thus leading to the abolition of the Black Sea Fleet, which had by 1997 been transferred to Russia) and Ukrainian membership in NATO. Western partners such as U.S. Secretary of State Madeleine Albright, former British Prime Minister Margaret Thatcher and Czech President Václav Havel met with Chornovil on multiple occasions, and he increasingly was regarded by Western leaders as a more trustworthy interlocutor than the largely ex-communist leadership of Ukraine. Chornovil was a devoted Atlanticist, and advocated for Ukraine to become a member of both NATO and the European Union. He viewed Ukraine as integral to European integration.

Along with a handful of other politicians, Chornovil attended the inauguration of Aslan Maskhadov as President of the Chechen Republic of Ichkeria in 1997. Rukh formally declared itself to be in opposition to Kuchma's rule in October of the same year.

==== 1998 election ====
Map of the results of 1998 Ukrainian parliamentary election (proportional representation votes); Rukh (shown in teal) dominated the vote in western Ukraine

Chornovil again led Rukh in the 1998 Ukrainian parliamentary election, this time running as the first candidate on the party's proportional representation list. During the election, Rukh reversed course on federalism, with Chornovil arguing that calls for Ukraine to become a federal republic were "clan federalism". Chornovil was joined by Volodymyr Cherniak, Foreign Minister Hennadiy Udovenko, Drach and Environment Minister Yuriy Kostenko as the leading party-list candidates, along with Crimean Tatar activist Mustafa Dzhemilev. Rukh did not form a coalition with any other parties to contest the election, though its candidates included members of non-governmental organisations such as Prosvita and the Ukrainian Women's Union. The party generally campaigned against the left. Chornovil called on all National-Democratic parties to form a coalition against the left and the right-wing Congress of Ukrainian Nationalists, additionally arguing for a grand coalition with the pro-Kuchma People's Democratic Party and the Social Democratic Party of Ukraine (united). No party agreed to Chornovil's requests for a coalition.

Though they were the second-largest party in the Verkhovna Rada, the result was positive for Rukh, which doubled its seats compared to 1994. For the right in general, however, the election was a disappointment, as only Rukh passed the 4% threshold for party-list representation and the right in general underperformed its traditional result of 20–25% of seats. Rukh announced its intention to challenge the election results as illegitimate following the election. The Communist Party of Ukraine again became the largest party in the Verkhovna Rada, with left-wing parties forming a majority. Though he noted that the results were not as bad for the right as the prior election, Chornovil was left exhausted by the campaign and obtained a public image as being constantly fatigued. At the time, he was sleeping no more than five hours per day due to his balancing of commitments between Chas-Time and politics. In Lviv Oblast, his traditional support base and a holdout against the privatisation that had occurred throughout Ukraine, Rukh's government was replaced by that of the Agrarian Party, under which political scandals involving kickbacks, money laundering and violence resulting from business feuds became frequent.

==== Ninth congress, 1999 presidential election, split in Rukh ====
At Rukh's ninth congress, held from 12 to 13 December 1998, Chornovil announced the party's strategy for the 1999 presidential election. Titled "Forwards, to the east", it called for greater focus on the populations of eastern and southern Ukraine while maintaining its opposition to the establishment of Russian as a co-official language with Ukrainian.

At the same congress, Chornovil announced his intention to contest the presidency for a second time in the 1999 election. (Note: The Encyclopedia of Modern Ukraine has claimed that Chornovil refused to participate in the election, but this is rejected by Hai-Nyzhnyk and Chornovil's son Taras.) Chornovil and Hennadiy Udovenko were the two primary candidates from Rukh to be nominated for the presidency; the final decision was intended to be made at a later date. According to Viktor Pynzenyk, leader of the centre-right Reforms and Order Party, he and Chornovil also attempted to persuade Viktor Yushchenko, Governor of the National Bank of Ukraine, to run for the presidency in 1999.

By this time, a split between members of Rukh who regarded Chornovil as an outdated figure and those who supported him was becoming increasingly apparent. Opponents of Chornovil within the party regarded him as overly-authoritarian, disrespectful of party rules and too close to Kuchma; Chornovil's supporters likewise regarded his opponents as too close to Kuchma and supported by monied interests. Ukrainian historian Pavlo Hai-Nyzhnyk has said that Chornovil withdrew his name from the presidential nomination in January 1999 and according to the Jamestown Foundation he endorsed Udovenko, though Chornovil's son Taras has disputed this, saying he was still campaigning for the presidency until his death. (Note: English-language Ukrainian diaspora newspaper The Ukrainian Weekly wrote in their April 1999 memorial issue for Chornovil that he had been supporting and campaigning for Udovenko at the time of his death. The National Democratic Institute also wrote in October 1999 that Chornovil had lent his support to Udovenko, leading to the split in Rukh. The Ukrainian Independent Information Agency described Chornovil as Kuchma's "main rival" (Ukrainian: головний конкурент, romanised: holovnyi konkurent) in the 1999 election in a 2021 article, while academic Stanislav Ovsiienko called Chornovil a "competing candidate" to Kuchma in a 2022 journal article.)

The split came to a head in February 1999. Yuriy Kostenko led a contingent of Rukh in declaring Chornovil to be removed as leader in a 17 or 19 February parliamentary meeting, and declared himself leader of the party in a 27 February meeting of his supporters. Chornovil responded at a 22 February press conference where he compared them to the State Committee on the State of Emergency that led the 1991 Soviet coup attempt and accused them of taking $40,000 per month from the Ukrainian government, of taking 4,000 hryvnias from a Rukh office, and of taking a million-dollar bribe from Rukh People's Deputy Oleh Ishchenko. Kyiv Post deputy editor Jaroslaw Koshiw wrote in a 25 February opinion article that only 17 deputies remained loyal to Chornovil following Kostenko's defection.

The multitude of newspapers belonging to Rukh were split by the feud; 11 supported Chornovil, while five backed Kostenko. Dzerkalo Tyzhnia took an independent stance, but generally blamed Chornovil for the split, along with Kuchma and presidential candidate Yevhen Marchuk. Chornovil and his followers were scornful towards Kostenko's faction following the split; Les Tanyuk said that "These are people more concerned right now with getting their Mercedes and building their dachas", while Chornovil referred to Kostenko's attempted takeover as a "privatisation of the party" and blamed Kuchma and the government for orchestrating the split.

In a 2012 court proceeding relating to Chornovil's death, Udovenko testified that in February 1999 he was contacted by Viacheslav Babenko, a Ukrainian citizen employed by the Russian Federal Security Service (FSB). According to Udovenko, Babenko warned him that there would be an attempt on Chornovil's life involving Russian intelligence agencies. Chornovil dismissed Babenko's warning as an attempt at intimidation. Mykola Stepanenko, a Ministry of Internal Affairs employee tasked with investigating Chornovil's death, noted Babenko as an individual who had substantial knowledge of Chornovil's daily routine and travel plans.

Chornovil renamed Rukh's parliamentary faction to "People's Movement of Ukraine – 1" on 24 February. On 28 February, Kostenko's supporters organised what they referred to as the tenth congress of Rukh, during which they declared that Chornovil had been officially removed as leader and that the party's period of opposition would be replaced by one of "equal partnership". A congress of Chornovil's followers, referred to as the "second stage" of the Ninth Congress by Chornovil, was held on 7 March and attended by 520 delegates of the Rukh assembly, more than the two-thirds requirement under the party's statute.

== Death and funeral ==
On 24 March 1999, Chornovil was at a campaign event in the city of Kirovohrad (now Kropyvnytskyi), either for himself or Udovenko. (Note: According to Adrian Karatnycky, a human rights activist and personal friend of Chornovil, he had declared his candidacy that day, while the Encyclopedia of Ukraine says that he declared his candidacy four days prior; see previous note for further information on the dispute as to whether or not he was running for the presidency.) While in Kirovohrad, he gave an interview where he expressed the belief that Ukraine's financial and organised crime clans (Note: The Dnipropetrovsk Mafia, the Kyiv Seven and the Donetsk Clan.) were targeting Rukh in an attempt to destroy it and secure the further accumulation of financial capital. He further claimed that Kuchma could only win by assassinating his opponents or turning them against one another. Details of his last phone calls are disputed; his sister Valentyna has said that he wished her a happy birthday and described Rukh's split as being "all behind us", while Kostenko alleged that he indicated that he had changed his mind and wished to support him, rather than Udovenko, for the presidency.

Shortly before midnight on 25 March 1999, Chornovil was returning to Kyiv from Kirovohrad with aide Yevhen Pavlov and Rukh press secretary Dmytro Ponomarchuk. (Note: Sometimes incorrectly written as "Dmytro Palamarchuk".) Five kilometres from Boryspil, while travelling at a speed of 140 kilometres per hour (87 mph), Chornovil's Toyota Corolla collided with a Kamaz lorry carrying grain that was stalling at a bend on the highway. Chornovil and Pavlov were both killed instantly, while Ponomarchuk was hospitalised with serious injuries.

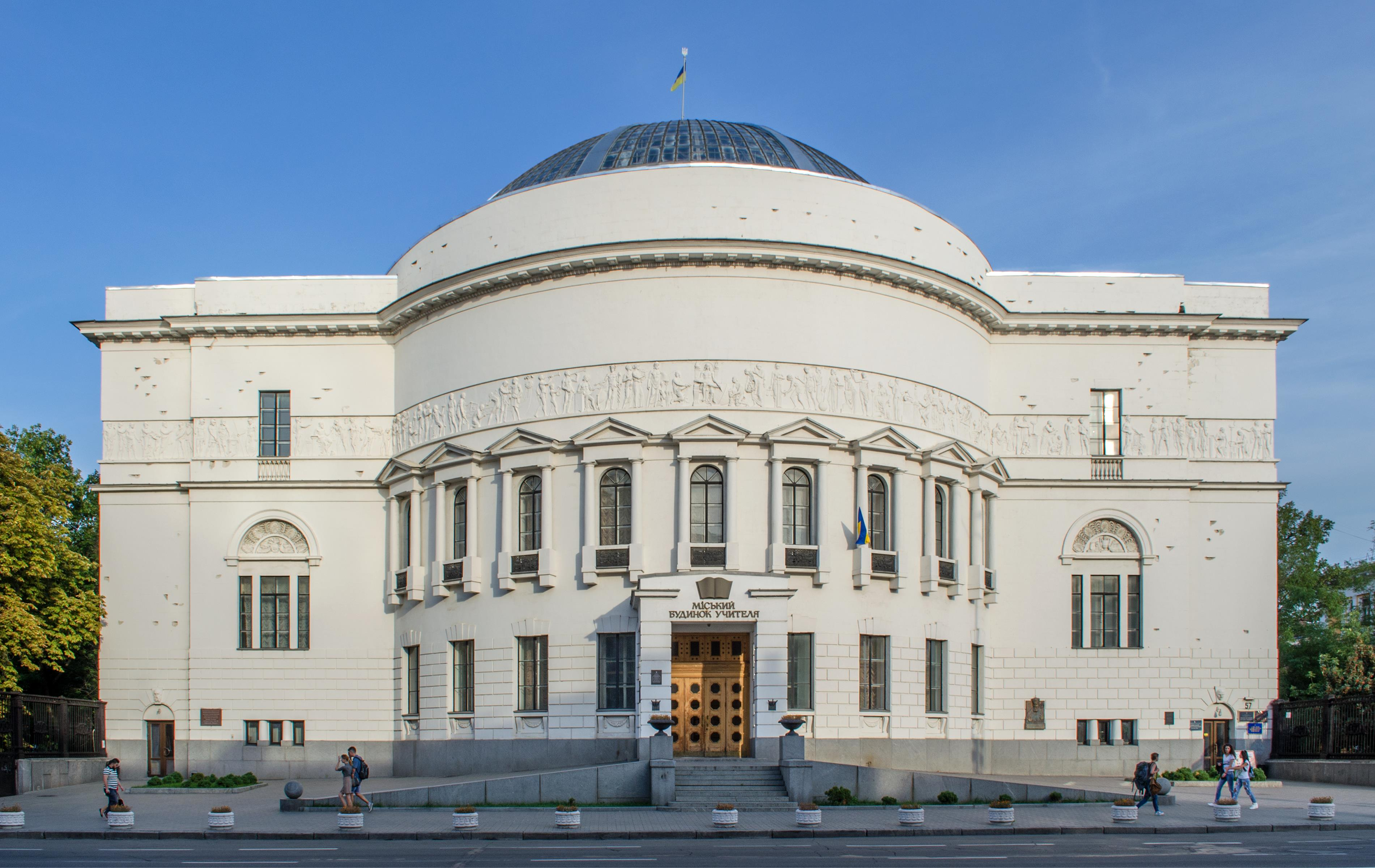
The Kyiv City Teacher's House, former seat of the Central Rada, where Chornovil's funeral took place

Chornovil's funeral was held at Kyiv's City Teacher's House (where the Ukrainian People's Republic had been proclaimed in 1917) on 29 March, with a procession travelling to St Volodymyr's Cathedral before his burial at Baikove Cemetery. The Guardian reported that "tens of thousands of Ukrainians" were present; the Militsiya claimed a figure of 10,000; while The Ukrainian Weekly wrote that nearly 50,000 attended "what many consider the largest funeral this city [Kyiv] has ever seen". He was granted a state honour guard, as well as a military orchestra. Most of Ukraine's political elite was present at the funeral, including Kravchuk (who cried at Chornovil's funeral despite their long-running rivalry), Kuchma, Prime Minister Valeriy Pustovoitenko, and Chairman of the Verkhovna Rada Oleksandr Tkachenko, as well as several former dissidents and the leaders of almost all political parties, with the notable exceptions of the Communist Party (led by Petro Symonenko) and the Progressive Socialist Party of Ukraine (led by Nataliya Vitrenko).

=== Conspiracy theories and investigations ===
Suspicions of Ukrainian government involvement in Chornovil's death emerged almost immediately, inflamed by Chornovil's controversial nature and the impending presidential election. Minister of Internal Affairs Yuriy Kravchenko said in a televised speech on the evening of Chornovil's death that an assassination would not be considered in investigating Chornovil's death. Prior to his burial, Tanyuk and Christian Democratic Party deputy Vitaliy Zhuravskyi both alleged that Chornovil had been murdered, while journalist Serhii Naboka noted that the circumstances of his death were similar to other suspicious deaths of Soviet leaders' political opponents. The lorry driver was initially charged with recklessness, but amnestied within a month, and one passenger of the lorry died under unclear circumstances. Karatnycky, citing an anonymous member of Kuchma's 1999 campaign, notes that Kuchma's other non-communist rivals failed to form a coalition against him, ultimately leading to his victory; Ukrainian political scientist Taras Kuzio likewise describes Kuchma and Yevhen Marchuk as the only serious non-leftist contenders for the presidency following Chornovil's death.

The first attempt to investigate Chornovil's death began with a Verkhovna Rada commission in April 1999. Following the 2004–2005 Orange Revolution, Kuchma's successor Viktor Yushchenko announced that the investigation into the circumstances of the death of Chornovil would be renewed at a 23 August 2006 ceremony inaugurating a statue of Chornovil. On 6 September 2006, Minister of Internal Affairs Yuriy Lutsenko declared that Chornovil had been murdered and that evidence proving it had been handed over to the Prosecutor General of Ukraine. Prosecutor General Oleksandr Medvedko criticised Lutsenko's statements regarding the case as "to put it mildly, unprofessional", and alleged that the information came from an individual convicted of fraud and for whom an Interpol notice had been issued. Since then, investigations into Chornovil's death have been repeatedly closed and reopened without concluding whether Chornovil was the victim of an assassination plot or a simple car crash. The Boryspil District Court declared that an assassination plot did not exist in January 2014 and closed the case, but as of March 2015 it was again the subject of an investigation by the Prosecutor General's office. As of 2019, the case remained under investigation.

== Legacy ==
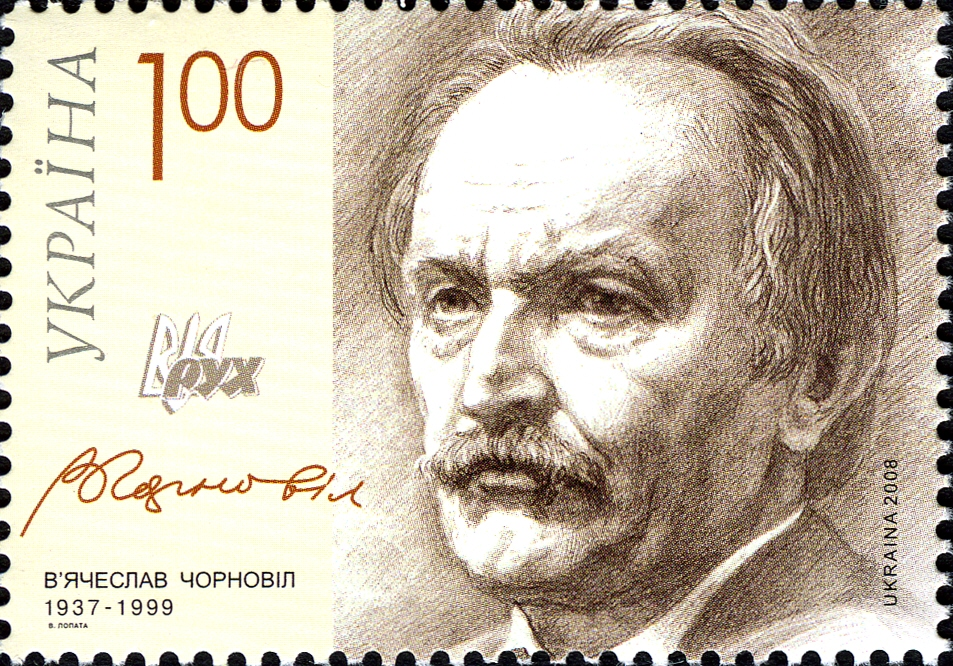
Ukrainian stamp honoring Chornovil, 2008

Within his lifetime, Chornovil was a controversial figure. Volodymyr Hrynyov, one of his opponents in the 1991 election, said in 1992 that voters had been enticed to support Kravchuk out of distrust for Chornovil's nationalistic attitudes and belief that they were antisemitic and anti-Russian; Chornovil rejected these claims, claiming that "there is no anti-Semitism in everyday life" and noting that the majority of Lviv's ethnically-Russian population had supported Ukrainian independence. As a co-leader of the UHS, the more radically anti-communist attitudes of Chornovil and the party's other leaders brought the label of extremism to the party, according to Maryana Kolinchak of the Central European University. On the right, more radical nationalists, such as Zenovii Krasivskyi, criticised Chornovil and Lukianenko for working within Soviet political structures during the late 1980s, rather than immediately embracing independence as a political ideal. Within Rukh, perceptions of Chornovil as an authoritarian leader led to two splits (in 1993 and 1999).

Peter Marusenko, a journalist for The Guardian, argued while reporting Chornovil's funeral that his contribution to Ukrainian history was not recognised by many Ukrainians until after his death. In his 2017 book The Near Abroad, professor Zbigniew Wojnowski described Chornovil as "a more inclusive vision of Ukraine, unambiguously pro-European and united by commitment to the rule of law and parliamentary democracy", in contrast to early and mid-20th century nationalist leader Stepan Bandera, and noted that a large poster of Chornovil was present during the 2013–2014 Euromaidan protests. Wojnowski defines Chornovil's ideology of "reformist patriotism", advocating for Ukraine to follow reforms of and maintain historical links with Central Europe, as spreading throughout Ukrainian society following Euromaidan and the Orange Revolution.

More critically, Chornovil has been accused of ignoring political realities in lieu of "romanticism" and having a naïve attitude towards politics, as in a 2017 Radio Liberty article by philosopher and writer Petro Kraliuk. In particular, Kraliuk notes Chornovil's belief in federalism and refusal to work with Kravchuk following his 1991 election defeat as unconstructive.

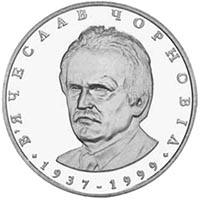
Commemorative 2-hryvnia coin depicting Chornovil

Chornovil was posthumously awarded the title of Hero of Ukraine in 2000, in recognition of his significance in reestablishing a Ukrainian state. He was also awarded the Shevchenko National Prize in 1996 for his investigative journalism, particularly his samvydav (among them Court of Law or a Return of the Terror? and Woe from Wit), and the Order of Prince Yaroslav the Wise in 1997. He has twice been placed among the ten most popular Ukrainians of all time. In the 2008 Velyki Ukraïntsi poll, he was placed as Ukraine's seventh most-popular figure, with 2.63% of individuals polled naming him as the greatest Ukrainian of all time. In the 2022 "People's Top" poll, he was the ninth most-popular Ukrainian, with previous polling indicating that his support had increased from 3.5% in 2012 to 8.7% in 2022.

In 2003, the National Bank of Ukraine issued a commemorative coin with the nominal of 2 hryvnias dedicated to Chornovil. In 2009, a Ukrainian stamp devoted to Chornovil was issued.

== See also ==
- List of unsolved deaths
- List of members of the Verkhovna Rada of Ukraine who died in office
