= Galician Assembly =

The Galician Assembly (Ukrainian: Галицька Асамблея, romanized: Halytska Asambleia) was the joint session of the regional oblast councils of Lviv, Ternopil and Ivano-Frankivsk on February 16, 1991 in Ukraine (at the time part of the Ukrainian Soviet Socialist Republic). The assembly approved an agreement of cooperation between the three regional councils in political, economic, scientific, humanitarian and cultural spheres to counterbalance the political instability in the Soviet Union.

== See also ==
- Regionalism in Ukraine
