= Elections in Ukraine =

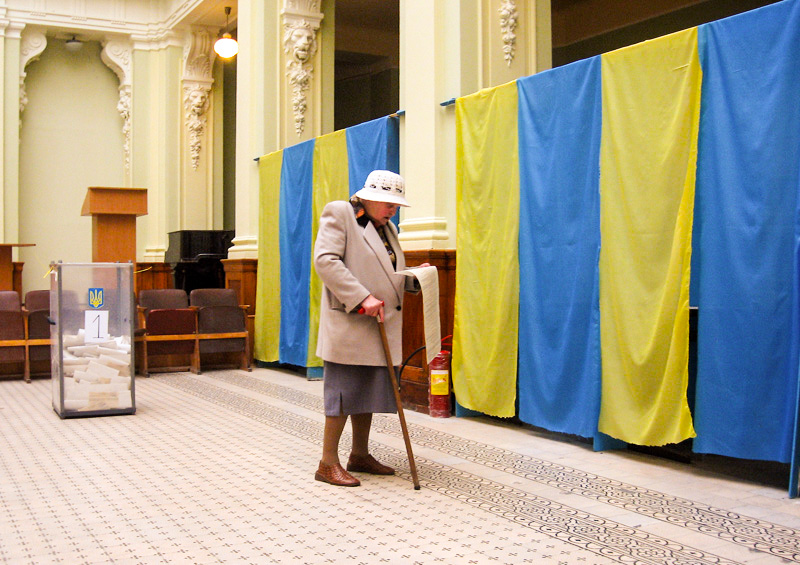
A woman with ballot during 2007 Ukrainian parliamentary election

Elections in Ukraine are held to choose the president (head of state), Verkhovna Rada (legislature), and local governments. Referendums may be held on special occasions. Ukraine has a multi-party system: often no single party has a chance of gaining power alone, and parties must work with each other to form coalition governments.

== Latest election ==
=== 2019 Ukrainian parliamentary election ===
Party	Proportional			Constituency			Total seats	+/–
Party	Votes	%	Seats	Votes	%	Seats	Total seats	+/–
Servant of the People	6,307,793	43.16	124	4,630,880	32.87	130	254	New
Opposition Platform — For Life	1,908,111	13.06	37	987,832	7.01	6	43	New
Batkivshchyna	1,196,303	8.19	24	686,734	4.87	2	26	+6
European Solidarity	1,184,620	8.11	23	589,918	4.19	2	25	–106
Holos	851,722	5.83	17	401,903	2.85	3	20	New
Radical Party of Oleh Liashko	586,384	4.01	0	152,191	1.08	0	0	–22
Strength and Honor	558,652	3.82	0	175,397	1.24	0	0	0
Opposition Bloc — Party for Peace and Development	443,195	3.03	0	377,191	2.68	6	6	New
Ukrainian Strategy of Groysman	352,934	2.42	0				0	New
Party of Shariy	327,152	2.24	0	12,054	0.09	0	0	New
Svoboda	315,568	2.16	0	452,373	3.21	1	1	–6
Civil Position	153,225	1.05	0	103,044	0.73	0	0	0
Party of Greens of Ukraine	96,659	0.66	0				0	0
Self Reliance	91,596	0.63	0	135,297	0.96	1	1	–32
Agrarian Party of Ukraine	75,509	0.52	0	96,139	0.68	0	0	New
Movement of New Forces	67,740	0.46	0	7,683	0.05	0	0	New
Power of the People	27,984	0.19	0	49,117	0.35	0	0	0
Power of Law	20,340	0.14	0				0	New
Patriot	16,123	0.11	0	18,015	0.13	0	0	New
Social Justice	15,967	0.11	0	2,615	0.02	0	0	New
Independence	7,970	0.05	0				0	New
Torch	7,739	0.05	0				0	New
United Centre				44,485	0.32	1	1	New
People's Movement of Ukraine				41,482	0.29	0	0	0
Ukrainian Democratic Alliance for Reform				22,279	0.16	0	0	–
Bila Tserkva Together				20,277	0.14	1	1	New
Democratic Axis				13,613	0.10	0	0	New
Civil Movement of Ukraine				12,037	0.09	0	0	0
Joint Action				7,071	0.05	0	0	0
Ukrainian Unity Party				6,355	0.05	0	0	New
Congress of Ukrainian Nationalists				5,318	0.04	0	0	0
Right Sector				5,093	0.04	0	0	–1
Our Land				4,709	0.03	0	0	New
All-Ukrainian Union "Cherkashchany"				4,283	0.03	0	0	New
Social and Political Platform of Nadiya Savchenko				3,949	0.03	0	0	New
Party of Free Democrats				3,599	0.03	0	0	New
Ukrainian Party				3,268	0.02	0	0	New
Party of Pensioners of Ukraine				3,262	0.02	0	0	0
Ukraine the Glorious				3,064	0.02	0	0	0
Native City				2,376	0.02	0	0	0
Socialist Party of Ukraine				1,990	0.01	0	0	0
Liberty				1,802	0.01	0	0	0
Community and Law				1,527	0.01	0	0	New
Darth Vader Bloc				1,164	0.01	0	0	New
Development				903	0.01	0	0	New
Republican Christian Party				902	0.01	0	0	New
Aware Nation				766	0.01	0	0	New
Real Action				764	0.01	0	0	New
Party of Local Self-Governance				520	0.00	0	0	New
Meritocratic Party of Ukraine				517	0.00	0	0	0
Trust the Deeds				428	0.00	0	0	New
Gypsy Party of Ukraine				388	0.00	0	0	New
Internet Party of Ukraine				370	0.00	0	0	0
Bdzhola				222	0.00	0	0	New
People's Truth				206	0.00	0	0	New
Student Party of Ukraine				138	0.00	0	0	New
Pirate Party of Ukraine				133	0.00	0	0	New
Independents				4,992,514	35.43	46	46	–51
Vacant						26	26	–
Total	14,613,286	100.00	225	14,090,157	100.00	225	450	0
Valid votes	14,613,286	99.01						
Invalid/blank votes	146,262	0.99						
Total votes	14,759,548	100.00						
Registered voters/turnout	29,973,739	49.24						
Source: CLEA, CVK

=== 2019 Ukrainian presidential election ===
Candidate	Party	First round		Second round	
Candidate	Party	Votes	%	Votes	%
Volodymyr Zelenskyy	Servant of the People	5,714,034	30.61	13,541,528	74.96
Petro Poroshenko	Independent (BPP)	3,014,609	16.15	4,522,450	25.04
Yulia Tymoshenko	Batkivshchyna	2,532,452	13.56		
Yuriy Boyko	Independent	2,206,216	11.82		
Anatoliy Hrytsenko	Civil Position	1,306,450	7.00		
Ihor Smeshko	Independent	1,141,332	6.11		
Oleh Liashko	Radical Party of Oleh Liashko	1,036,003	5.55		
Oleksandr Vilkul	Opposition Bloc	784,274	4.20		
Ruslan Koshulynskyi	Svoboda	307,244	1.65		
Yuriy Tymoshenko	Independent	117,693	0.63		
Oleksandr Shevchenko	UKROP	109,078	0.58		
Valentyn Nalyvaichenko	Spravedlyvist	43,239	0.23		
Olha Bohomolets	Independent	33,966	0.18		
Hennadiy Balashov	5.10	32,872	0.18		
Roman Bezsmertnyi	Independent	27,182	0.15		
Viktor Bondar	Revival	22,564	0.12		
Yulia Lytvynenko	Independent	20,014	0.11		
Yuriy Derevyanko	Liberty	19,542	0.10		
Serhiy Taruta	Osnova	18,918	0.10		
Ihor Shevchenko	Independent	18,667	0.10		
Inna Bohoslovska	Independent	18,482	0.10		
Yurii Karmazin	Independent	15,965	0.09		
Volodymyr Petrov	Independent	15,587	0.08		
Vitaliy Skotsyk	Independent	15,118	0.08		
Serhiy Kaplin	Social Democratic Party	14,532	0.08		
Oleksandr Moroz	Socialist Party of Oleksandr Moroz	13,139	0.07		
Viktor Kryvenko	People's Movement of Ukraine	9,243	0.05		
Vasyl Zhuravlyov	Stability Party	8,453	0.05		
Illia Kyva	Socialist Party of Ukraine	5,869	0.03		
Andriy Novak	Patriot Party	5,587	0.03		
Oleksandr Vashchenko	Independent	5,503	0.03		
Mykola Haber	Independent	5,433	0.03		
Oleksandr Solovyev	Reasonable Force	5,331	0.03		
Ruslan Rygovanov	Independent	5,230	0.03		
Oleksandr Danylyuk	Independent	4,648	0.02		
Vitalii Kuprii	Independent	4,508	0.02		
Arkadiy Kornatskiy	Independent	4,494	0.02		
Serhiy Nosenko	Independent	3,114	0.02		
Roman Nasirov	Independent	2,579	0.01		
Total		18,669,164	100.00	18,063,978	100.00
Valid votes		18,669,164	98.81	18,063,978	97.69
Invalid/blank votes		224,600	1.19	427,841	2.31
Total votes		18,893,764	100.00	18,491,819	100.00
Registered voters/turnout		30,047,302	62.88	30,105,004	61.42
Source: Central Election Commission (First round, second round)

== Result in history ==
=== 1994 Ukrainian parliamentary election ===
Party	Votes	%	Seats
Communist Party of Ukraine	3,683,332	13.57	86
People's Movement of Ukraine	1,491,164	5.49	20
Socialist Party of Ukraine	895,830	3.30	14
Peasant Party of Ukraine	794,614	2.93	19
Ukrainian Republican Party	728,614	2.68	8
Congress of Ukrainian Nationalists	361,352	1.33	5
Democratic Party of Ukraine	312,842	1.15	2
Party of Democratic Revival of Ukraine	239,763	0.88	4
Liberal Party of Ukraine	173,503	0.64	0
Ukrainian National Assembly	148,239	0.55	1
Party of Labor	114,409	0.42	4
Social Democratic Party of Ukraine	104,204	0.38	2
Christian Democratic Party of Ukraine	100,007	0.37	1
Ukrainian Conservative Republican Party	99,028	0.36	2
Toiling Congress of Ukraine	83,702	0.31	0
Civil Congress of Ukraine	72,473	0.27	2
Party of Greens of Ukraine	71,946	0.27	0
Social-National Party of Ukraine	49,483	0.18	0
Ukrainian Party of Justice	40,414	0.15	0
State Independence of Ukraine	24,722	0.09	0
Party of Economic Revival	20,829	0.08	0
Party of Slavic Unity of Ukraine	18,807	0.07	0
Organization of Ukrainian Nationalists	16,766	0.06	0
Ukrainian Party of Solidarity and Social Justice	12,847	0.05	0
Constitutional Democratic Party of Ukraine	12,711	0.05	0
Ukrainian Peasant Democratic Party	11,827	0.04	0
Liberal Democratic Party of Ukraine	8,576	0.03	0
Ukrainian National Conservative Party	6,668	0.02	0
Ukrainian Christian Democratic Party	5,917	0.02	0
Ukrainian Beer Lovers Party	1,806	0.01	0
Party of Free Peasants of Ukraine	1,169	0.00	0
Party of National Salvation of Ukraine	515	0.00	0
Other parties	28,166	0.10	0
Independents	14,894,269	54.87	168
Vacant			112
Against all	2,512,118	9.26	–
Total	27,142,632	100.00	450
Valid votes	27,142,632	93.71	
Invalid/blank votes	1,821,350	6.29	
Total votes	28,963,982	100.00	
Registered voters/turnout	38,204,100	75.81	
Source: Nohlen & Stöver

=== 1998 Ukrainian parliamentary election ===
Party	Proportional			Constituency			Total seats	+/–
Party	Votes	%	Seats	Votes	%	Seats	Total seats	+/–
Communist Party of Ukraine	6,550,353	25.44	84	3,495,711	13.62	37	121	+35
People's Movement of Ukraine	2,498,262	9.70	32	1,500,648	5.85	14	46	+26
Socialist Party – Peasant Party	2,273,788	8.83	29	1,067,267	4.16	5	34	+1
Party of Greens of Ukraine	1,444,264	5.61	19	196,044	0.76	0	19	+19
People's Democratic Party	1,331,460	5.17	17	985,770	3.84	11	28	+24
Hromada	1,242,235	4.82	16	880,073	3.43	8	24	New
Progressive Socialist Party of Ukraine	1,075,118	4.18	14	231,043	0.90	2	16	New
Social Democratic Party of Ukraine (united)	1,066,113	4.14	14	450,522	1.76	3	17	New
Agrarian Party of Ukraine	978,330	3.80	0	784,287	3.06	9	9	New
Reforms and Order Party	832,574	3.23	0	455,166	1.77	3	3	New
Laborious Ukraine (GKU–UPS)	813,326	3.16	0	123,869	0.48	1	1	–1
National Front (KUN–UKRP–URP)	721,966	2.80	0	642,125	2.50	5	5	–10
Together (LPU–PP)	502,969	1.95	0	309,371	1.21	1	1	–3
Forward Ukraine! (KDS–UKDP)	461,924	1.79	0	129,378	0.50	2	2	+2
Christian Democratic Party of Ukraine	344,826	1.34	0	190,783	0.74	2	2	+1
Bloc of Democratic Parties – NEP (DPU–PEV)	326,489	1.27	0	275,460	1.07	1	1	–1
Party of National Economic Development of Ukraine	250,476	0.97	0	28,418	0.11	0	0	New
SLON – Social Liberal Association (Viche–MBR)	241,367	0.94	0	112,968	0.44	1	1	0
Party of Regional Revival of Ukraine	241,262	0.94	0	204,631	0.80	2	2	New
All-Ukrainian Party of Workers	210,622	0.82	0	57,463	0.22	0	0	New
Soyuz	186,249	0.72	0	38,467	0.15	1	1	New
All-Ukrainian Party of Women's Initiatives	154,650	0.60	0	18,208	0.07	0	0	New
Republican Christian Party	143,496	0.56	0	70,064	0.27	0	0	New
Ukrainian National Assembly	105,977	0.41	0	88,136	0.34	0	0	–1
Social Democratic Party of Ukraine	85,045	0.33	0	36,670	0.14	0	0	–2
Motherland Defenders Party	81,808	0.32	0	26,286	0.10	0	0	New
Party of Spiritual, Economic and Social Progress	53,147	0.21	0	28,418	0.11	0	0	New
Party of Muslims of Ukraine	52,613	0.20	0	1,342	0.01	0	0	New
Fewer Words (SNPU–DSU)	45,155	0.18	0	65,760	0.26	1	1	0
European Choice of Ukraine (LDPU–USDP)	37,118	0.14	0	59,474	0.23	0	0	0
Communist Party (Bolshevik) of Ukraine				17,656	0.07	0	0	New
Women's Party of Ukraine				15,867	0.06	0	0	New
Party of Slavic Unity of Ukraine				12,470	0.05	0	0	0
Organization of Ukrainian Nationalists				1,944	0.01	0	0	0
Party of National Salvation of Ukraine				1,544	0.01	0	0	0
Independents				11,148,333	43.43	111	111	–57
Vacant						5	5	–
Against all	1,396,592	5.42	–	1,915,531	7.46	–	–	–
Total	25,749,574	100.00	225	25,667,167	100.00	225	450	0
Valid votes	25,749,574	96.91		25,667,167	96.60			
Invalid/blank votes	821,699	3.09		904,106	3.40			
Total votes	26,571,273	100.00		26,571,273	100.00			
Registered voters/turnout	37,540,092	70.78		37,540,092	70.78			
Source: Nohlen & Stöver, University of Essex

=== 2012 Ukrainian parliamentary election ===
Party	Proportional			Constituency			Total seats	+/–
Party	Votes	%	Seats	Votes	%	Seats	Total seats	+/–
Party of Regions	6,116,746	30.00	72	5,641,714	28.16	113	185	+10
Batkivshchyna	5,209,090	25.55	62	3,427,956	17.11	39	101	–55
Ukrainian Democratic Alliance for Reform	2,847,979	13.97	34	1,790,151	8.93	6	40	New
Communist Party of Ukraine	2,687,269	13.18	32	1,554,476	7.76	0	32	+5
Svoboda	2,129,933	10.45	25	848,854	4.24	12	37	+37
Ukraine – Forward!	322,198	1.58	0	187,006	0.93	0	0	New
Our Ukraine	226,492	1.11	0	51,654	0.26	0	0	–72
Radical Party of Oleh Liashko	221,144	1.08	0	105,236	0.53	1	1	New
Party of Pensioners of Ukraine	114,206	0.56	0	4,640	0.02	0	0	0
Socialist Party of Ukraine	93,071	0.46	0	121,752	0.61	0	0	0
Party of Greens of Ukraine	70,261	0.34	0	33,131	0.17	0	0	0
Ukrainian Party "Green Planet"	70,106	0.34	0	15,923	0.08	0	0	0
Russian Bloc	63,532	0.31	0	42,074	0.21	0	0	0
Greens	51,369	0.25	0				0	New
Ukraine of the Future	37,909	0.19	0	27,053	0.14	0	0	New
Native Fatherland	32,701	0.16	0	3,743	0.02	0	0	New
People's Labor Union of Ukraine	22,854	0.11	0	6,955	0.03	0	0	New
New Politics	21,030	0.10	0	15,168	0.08	0	0	0
Hromada	17,667	0.09	0	4,841	0.02	0	0	0
Ukrainian National Assembly	16,913	0.08	0	3,199	0.02	0	0	0
Liberal Party of Ukraine	15,549	0.08	0	3,255	0.02	0	0	0
People's Party				354,924	1.77	2	2	–18
United Centre				155,492	0.78	3	3	New
Congress of Ukrainian Nationalists				74,712	0.37	0	0	–
Ukrainian Platform "Sobor"				48,813	0.24	0	0	–
Soyuz				36,077	0.18	1	1	+1
Party of Hungarians of Ukraine				22,922	0.11	0	0	New
United Left and Peasants				21,542	0.11	0	0	New
Agrarian Party of Ukraine				16,225	0.08	0	0	New
People's Initiative				14,968	0.07	0	0	New
Russian Unity				13,806	0.07	0	0	New
European Party of Ukraine				13,533	0.07	0	0	–
Greater Ukraine				9,473	0.05	0	0	New
Patriotic Party of Ukraine				9,210	0.05	0	0	New
Ukrainian Party				9,088	0.05	0	0	New
Social-Environmental Party "Union. Chornobyl. Ukraine"				8,326	0.04	0	0	New
People's Party of Depositors and Social Security				7,684	0.04	0	0	New
Truth				6,391	0.03	0	0	New
People's Democratic Party				6,324	0.03	0	0	0
Ukrainian National Conservative Party				6,036	0.03	0	0	New
Viche				5,942	0.03	0	0	–
One Rus				5,860	0.03	0	0	New
Ukrainian Marine Party				5,535	0.03	0	0	New
State				5,422	0.03	0	0	New
Youth Party of Ukraine				5,297	0.03	0	0	New
Solidarity of Women of Ukraine				5,143	0.03	0	0	New
Fair Ukraine				4,808	0.02	0	0	New
People's Movement of Ukraine				3,081	0.02	0	0	–6
Slavic Party				2,197	0.01	0	0	New
Spiritual Ukraine				1,903	0.01	0	0	New
Union of Anarchists of Ukraine				1,696	0.01	0	0	New
Social-Patriotic Assembly of Slavs				1,620	0.01	0	0	New
Meritocratic Party of Ukraine				1,599	0.01	0	0	New
Young Ukraine				1,583	0.01	0	0	New
Civil Solidarity Party				1,579	0.01	0	0	New
Christian Democratic Party of Ukraine				1,210	0.01	0	0	New
Sam za sebe				1,198	0.01	0	0	New
Revival				1,109	0.01	0	0	New
People's Ecological Party				904	0.00	0	0	New
Christian Movement				597	0.00	0	0	New
Youth to Power				564	0.00	0	0	New
Liberal Democratic Party of Ukraine				529	0.00	0	0	New
Political Party of Small and Medium-sized Businesses of Ukraine				504	0.00	0	0	0
Law and Order				497	0.00	0	0	New
European Platform				455	0.00	0	0	New
Internet Party of Ukraine				416	0.00	0	0	New
Bloc Party				397	0.00	0	0	New
All-Ukrainian Union "Center"				366	0.00	0	0	0
For Human Rights				352	0.00	0	0	New
Civil Position				352	0.00	0	0	New
Democratic Party of Ukrainian Hunters				340	0.00	0	0	New
Social Democratic Party of Ukraine (united)				340	0.00	0	0	New
Right Will of Ukraine				243	0.00	0	0	New
Cossack Ukrainian Party				235	0.00	0	0	New
All-Ukrainian Political Party "Fraternity"				188	0.00	0	0	New
Party of Free Democrats				186	0.00	0	0	0
People's Order Party				124	0.00	0	0	New
Independents				5,248,373	26.19	43	43	New
Vacant						5	5	–
Total	20,388,019	100.00	225	20,037,071	100.00	225	450	0
Valid votes	20,388,019	98.03						
Invalid/blank votes	409,068	1.97						
Total votes	20,797,087	100.00						
Registered voters/turnout	36,213,010	57.43						
Source: CLEA

=== 2014 Ukrainian parliamentary election ===
Party	Proportional			Constituency			Total seats	+/–
Party	Votes	%	Seats	Votes	%	Seats	Total seats	+/–
People's Front	3,488,114	22.14	64	1,461,870	9.64	18	82	New
Petro Poroshenko Bloc	3,437,521	21.82	63	2,896,640	19.11	68	131	New
Self Reliance	1,729,271	10.98	32	161,175	1.06	1	33	New
Opposition Bloc	1,486,203	9.43	27	223,649	1.48	2	29	New
Radical Party of Oleh Liashko	1,173,131	7.45	22	601,022	3.96	0	22	+21
Batkivshchyna	894,837	5.68	17	960,285	6.33	3	20	–81
Svoboda	742,022	4.71	0	358,061	2.36	6	6	–31
Communist Party of Ukraine	611,923	3.88	0	226,176	1.49	0	0	–32
Strong Ukraine	491,471	3.12	0	259,676	1.71	1	1	New
Civil Position	489,523	3.11	0	51,731	0.34	0	0	0
Spade	418,301	2.66	0	134,418	0.89	1	1	New
Right Sector	284,943	1.81	0	156,763	1.03	1	1	+1
Solidarity of Women of Ukraine	105,094	0.67	0	8,649	0.06	0	0	0
5.10	67,124	0.43	0	4,324	0.03	0	0	New
Internet Party of Ukraine	58,197	0.37	0	8,709	0.06	0	0	0
Party of Greens of Ukraine	39,636	0.25	0	4,612	0.03	0	0	0
Green Planet	37,726	0.24	0	19,238	0.13	0	0	0
Revival	31,201	0.20	0				0	0
United Country	28,145	0.18	0				0	New
Ukraine – United Country	19,838	0.13	0				0	New
New Politics	19,222	0.12	0	7,481	0.05	0	0	0
Power of the People	17,817	0.11	0	44,161	0.29	0	0	New
Ukraine of the Future	14,168	0.09	0				0	New
Strength and Honor	13,549	0.09	0				0	New
Civil Movement of Ukraine	13,000	0.08	0				0	New
Bloc of Left Forces of Ukraine	12,499	0.08	0	37,800	0.25	0	0	New
National Democratic Party of Ukraine	11,826	0.08	0	7,243	0.05	0	0	New
Congress of Ukrainian Nationalists	8,976	0.06	0	31,889	0.21	0	0	0
Liberal Party of Ukraine	8,523	0.05	0	36,421	0.24	0	0	0
Ukrainian Platform "Sobor"				38,257	0.25	0	0	0
Democratic Alliance				31,796	0.21	0	0	New
Ukrainian Republican Party				24,845	0.16	0	0	New
Public Power				21,723	0.14	0	0	New
Joint Action				19,343	0.13	0	0	New
Justice				14,284	0.09	0	0	New
People's Party				13,197	0.09	0	0	–2
People's Movement of Ukraine				7,488	0.05	0	0	0
Meritocratic Party of Ukraine				3,032	0.02	0	0	0
Patriotic Party of Ukraine				2,268	0.01	0	0	0
Social Christian Party				450	0.00	0	0	0
Independents				7,282,814	48.03	97	97	+54
Vacant						27	27	–
Total	15,753,801	100.00	225	15,161,490	100.00	225	450	0
Valid votes	15,753,801	98.14						
Invalid/blank votes	298,402	1.86						
Total votes	16,052,203	100.00						
Registered voters/turnout	30,921,218	51.91						
Source: CLEA

== Legislation ==
Elections in Ukraine are held to choose the President (head of state) and Verkhovna Rada (legislature). The Ukrainian constitution does not allow holding Verkhovna Rada elections while martial law is in effect. The president is elected for a five-year term. The Verkhovna Rada has 450 members and is also elected for a five-year term, but may be dissolved earlier by the president in the case of a failure to form a government. The next election to the Verkhovna Rada, set to be held after the end of martial law due to the Russo-Ukrainian War, will be, for the first time, with different regional open lists (with again an electoral threshold of five percent) and a return, and thus abolition of the constituencies with first-past-the-post voting, to only one national constituency.

From 2012 until the 2019 Ukrainian parliamentary election the Verkhovna Rada was elected using a mixed election system. Half of the representatives were elected from national closed party lists distributed between the parties using the Hare quota with a 5% threshold. The remaining half were elected from constituencies using first-past-the-post voting. This system was adopted for the 2012 elections and was also used for the 2014 election, as a new draft law moving to electing all members using open party lists failed to gather necessary support in the Rada. According to current law, the next election to the Verkhovna Rada will again be without single-member constituencies and instead deputies can only be elected on a party list in one nationwide constituency with a 5% election threshold with open regional lists of candidates for deputies.

A snap poll must have a voter turnout higher than 50%.

Ukraine's election law forbids outside financing of political parties or campaigns.

Presidential candidates must have had residence in Ukraine for the past ten years prior to election day.

Since late February 2016 a party congress is allowed to remove any candidate from its party list before the Central Election Commission recognizes him or her elected. Meaning that parties after elections can prevent their candidates to take a seat in parliament that they were entitled to due to their place on the party list. A party is (since late February 2016) also allowed to excluded people from its electoral list of the last parliamentary elections.

In Ukraine political campaigning outside election campaign periods is prohibited. But this prohibition is widely ignored in election years and perpetraters are seldom punished since political parties use loopholes in election law.

=== Local elections ===
Under the Constitution of Ukraine, the term of office of the heads of villages and towns and the council members of these villages and towns is five years.

=== Past legislation ===
The parliamentary election law has been changed four times from 1991 to 2015. Before 1998 all the members of the Parliament were elected by single-seat constituencies (from each electoral district). In 1998 and in 2002 half of the members were elected by proportional representation (faction vote) and the other half by single-seat constituencies. In the 2006 and 2007 parliamentary election, all 450 members of the Verkhovna Rada were elected by party-list proportional representation with closed lists (the same goes for local elections).

In the 2010 Ukrainian local elections four years was set for the office of the heads of villages and towns and the council members of these villages and towns.

== Voting patterns ==
Since the dissolution of the Soviet Union, the Communist Party of Ukraine politically dominated most of Ukraine. By mid 1990s the communists completely lost popularity in western Ukraine, which voted for any representative but communist. Since Leonid Kuchma left presidential post, in 2004 support for the Communist Party shifted towards the Party of Regions being politically dominating mostly over the southeastern Ukraine. At the same time initially led by the People's Movement of Ukraine, political leadership in the non-communist camp was taken over by Our Ukraine bloc and Bloc of Yulia Tymoshenko.

In the elections since 2002 voters of Western and Central Ukrainian oblasts voted mostly for parties (Our Ukraine, Batkivshchyna, UDAR, Self Reliance, Radical Party, Petro Poroshenko Bloc and the People's Front) and presidential candidates (Viktor Yushchenko, Yulia Tymoshenko) with a pro-Western and state reform platform, while voters in Southern and Eastern oblasts of Ukraine voted for parties (CPU, Party of Regions and Opposition Bloc) and presidential candidates (Viktor Yanukovych) with a pro-Russian and status quo platform. Although this geographical division is decreasing. Till the 2014 Ukrainian parliamentary election the electorate of CPU and Party of Regions was very loyal to them. But in the 2014 parliamentary election Party of Regions did not to participate (because of a perceived lack of legitimacy (of the election), because not every resident of the Donbas could vote) and the CPU came 1.12% short of the 5% election threshold. The results were a victory for the pro-Western parties and a major defeat for the pro-Russian camp.

A 2010 study by the Institute of Social and Political Psychology of Ukraine found that in general, Yulia Tymoshenko supporters are more optimistic compared with Viktor Yanukovych supporters. 46 percent of the Tymoshenko's backers expect improvement in their well-being in the next year compared to 30 percent for Yanukovych.

=== Parliamentary elections ===
==== by party list ====
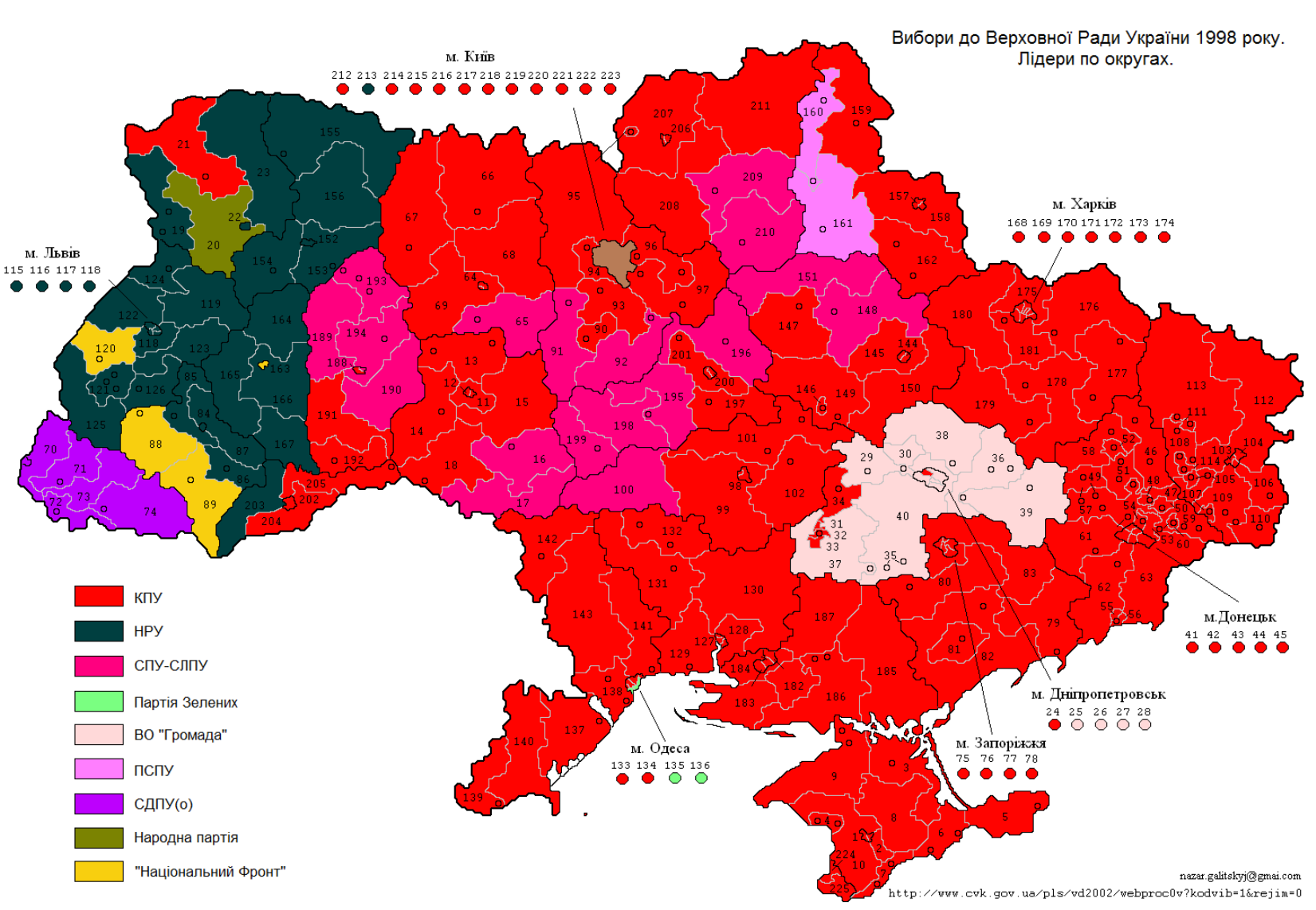
1998 Parliament

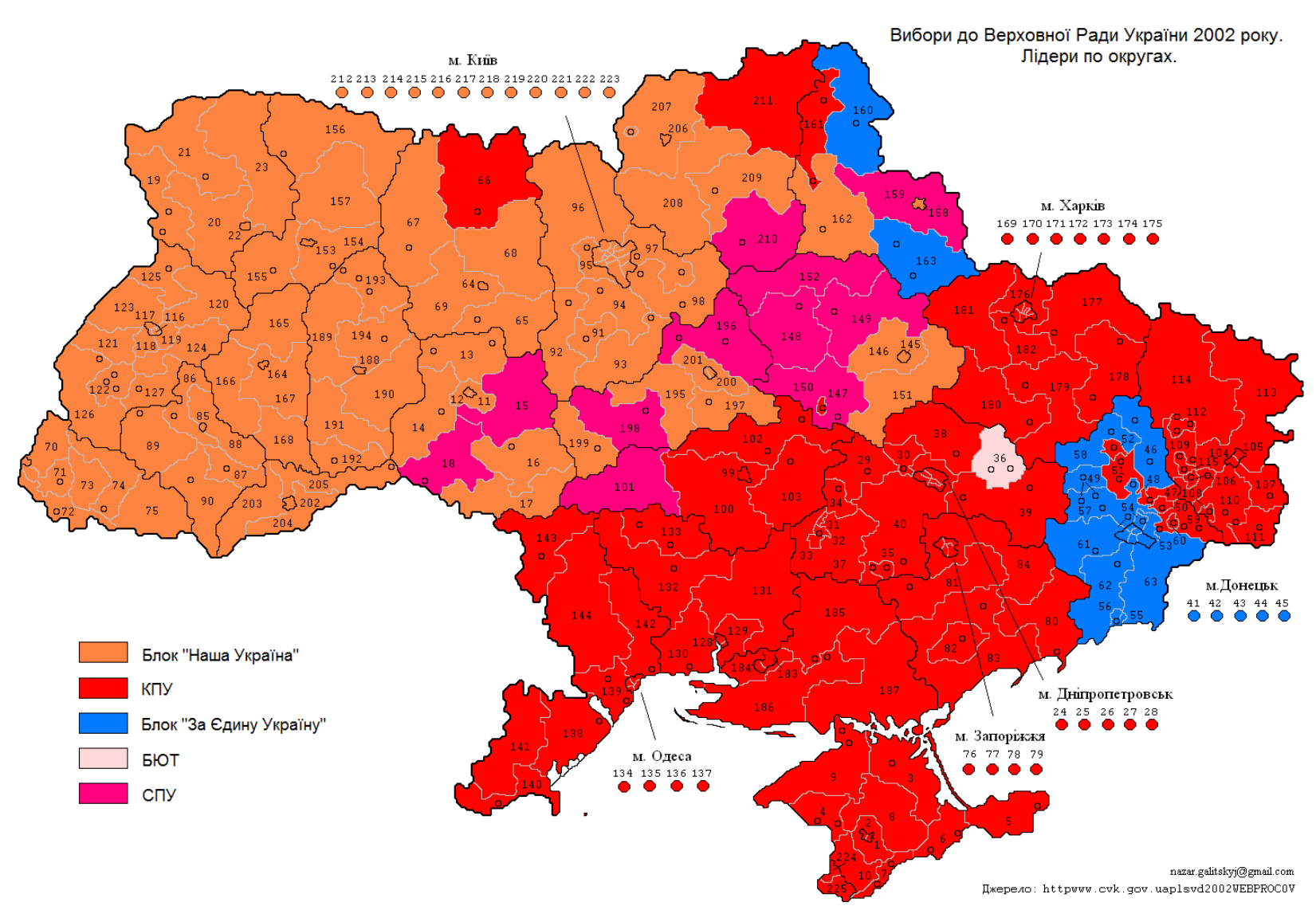
2002 Parliament

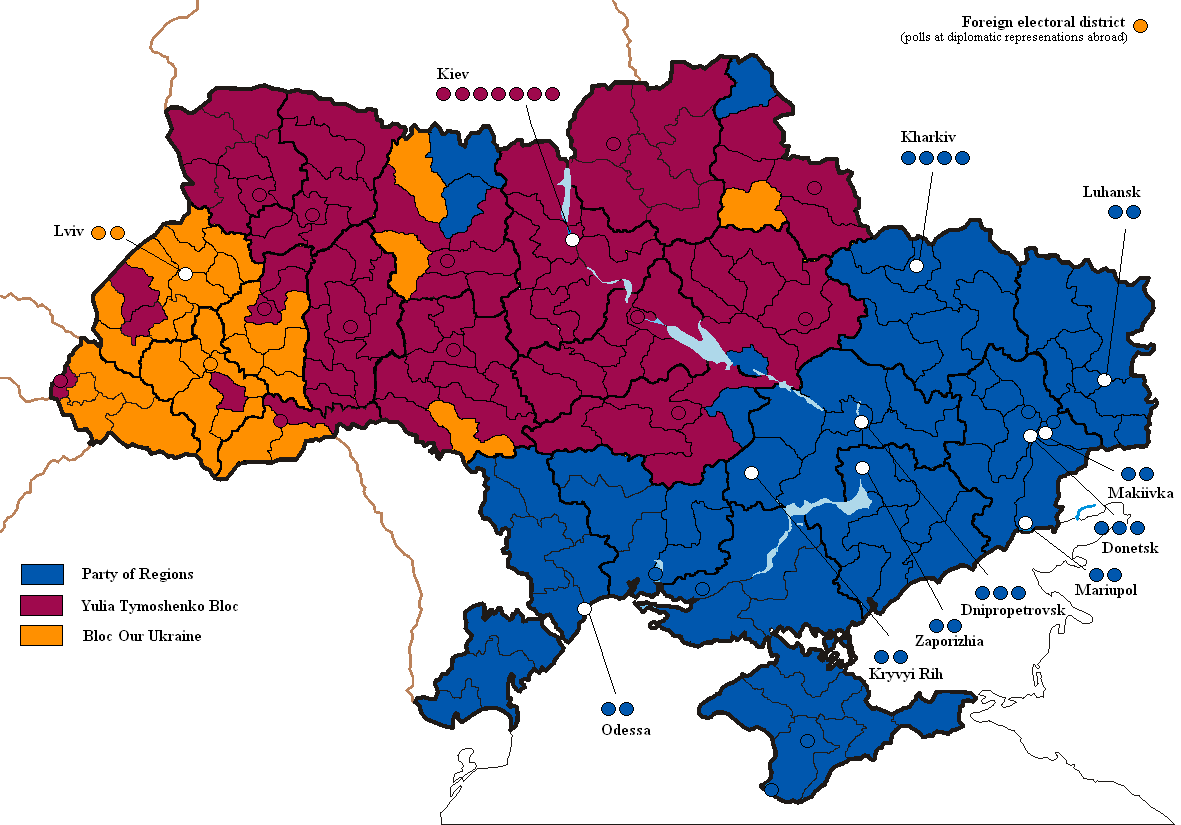
2006 Parliament

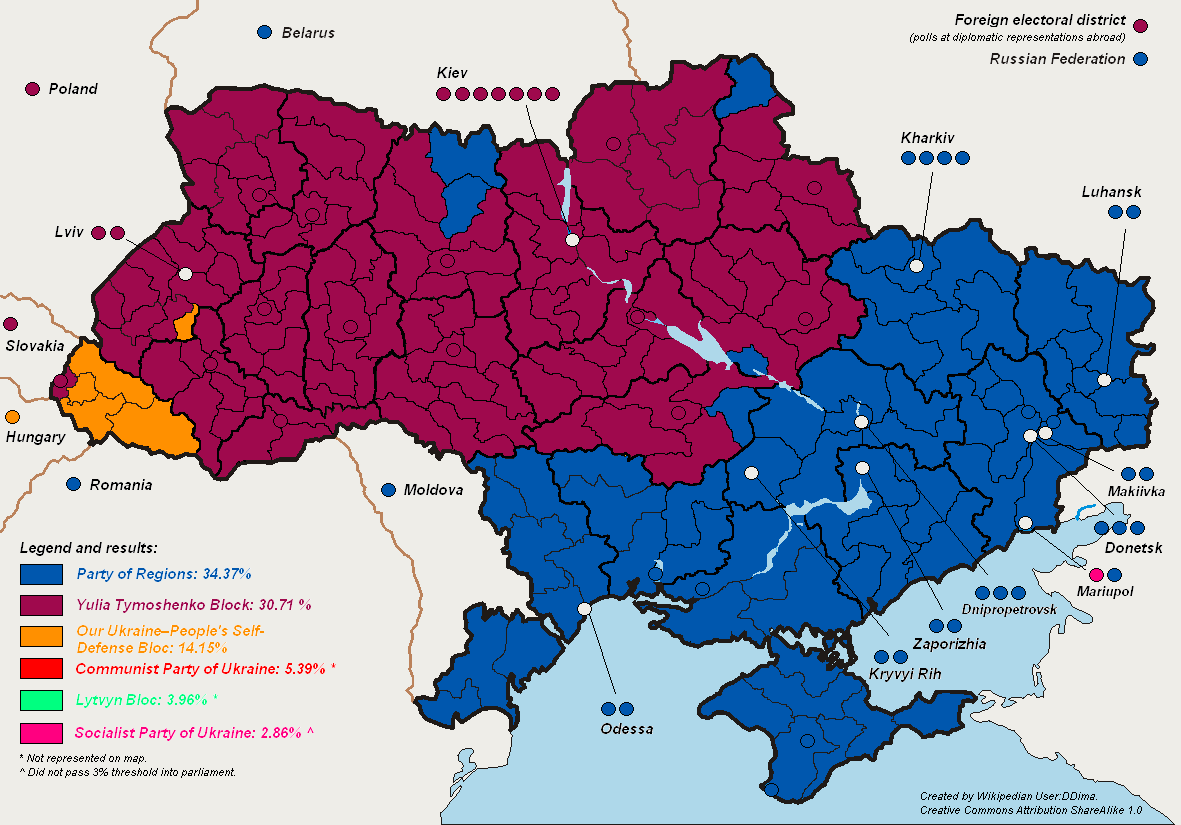
2007 Parliament

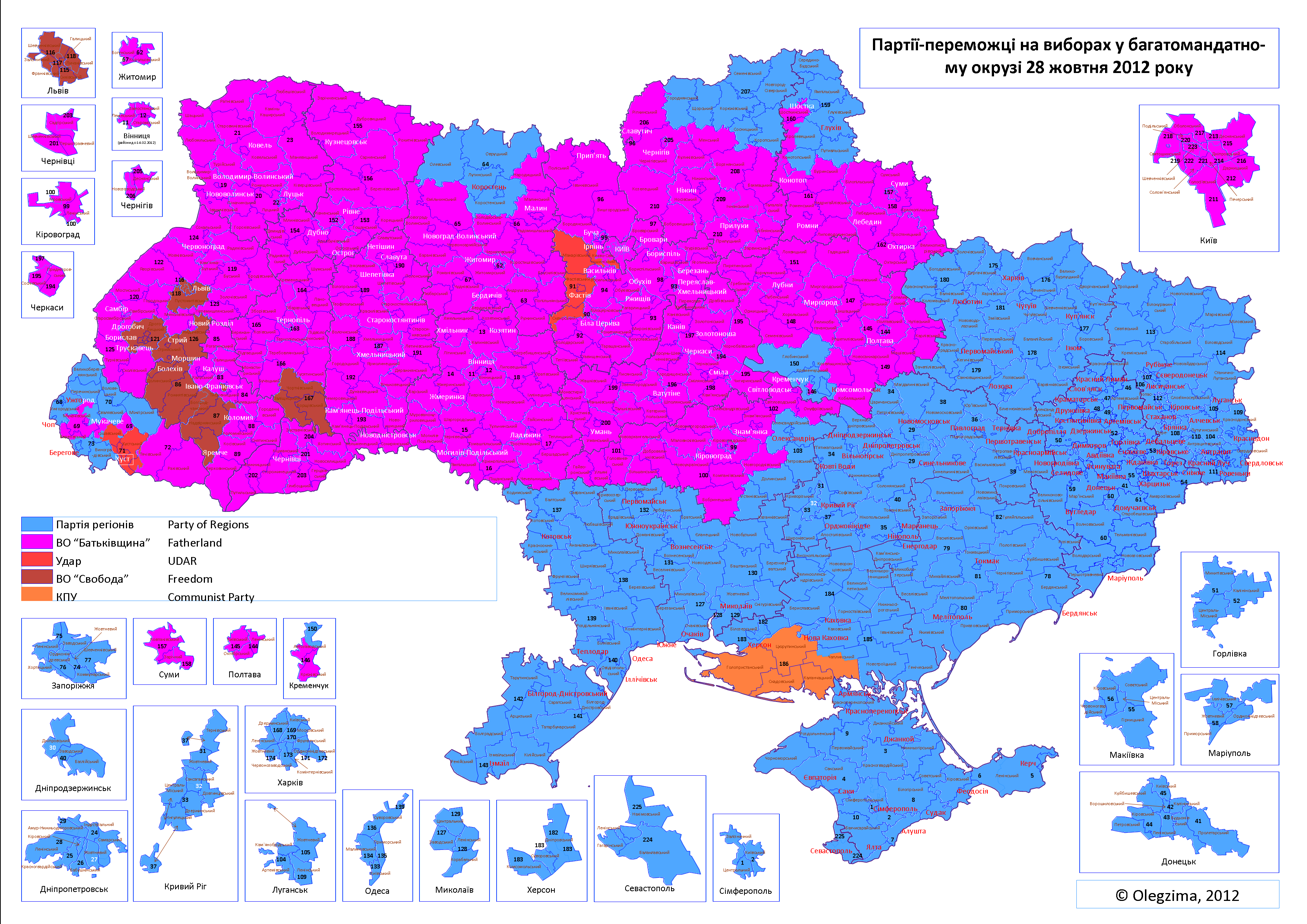
2012 Parliament

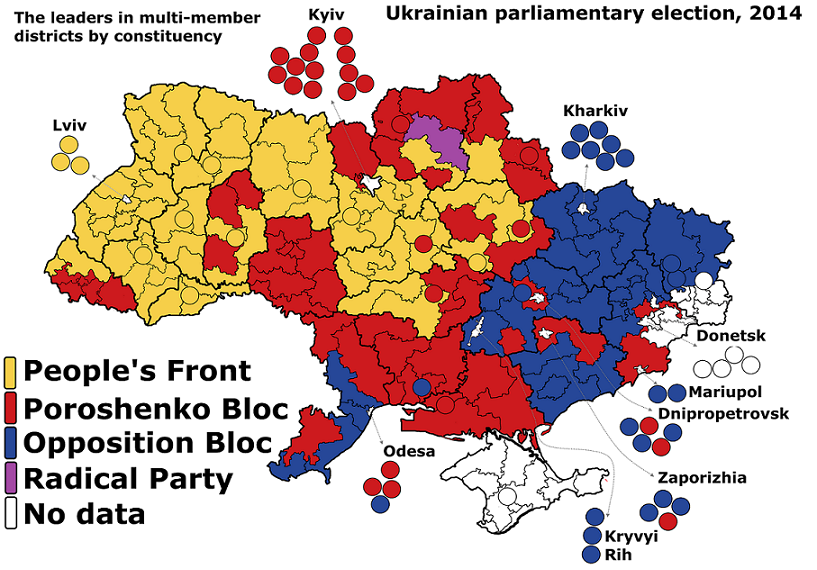
2014 Parliament

2019 Parliament

==== by constituency ====
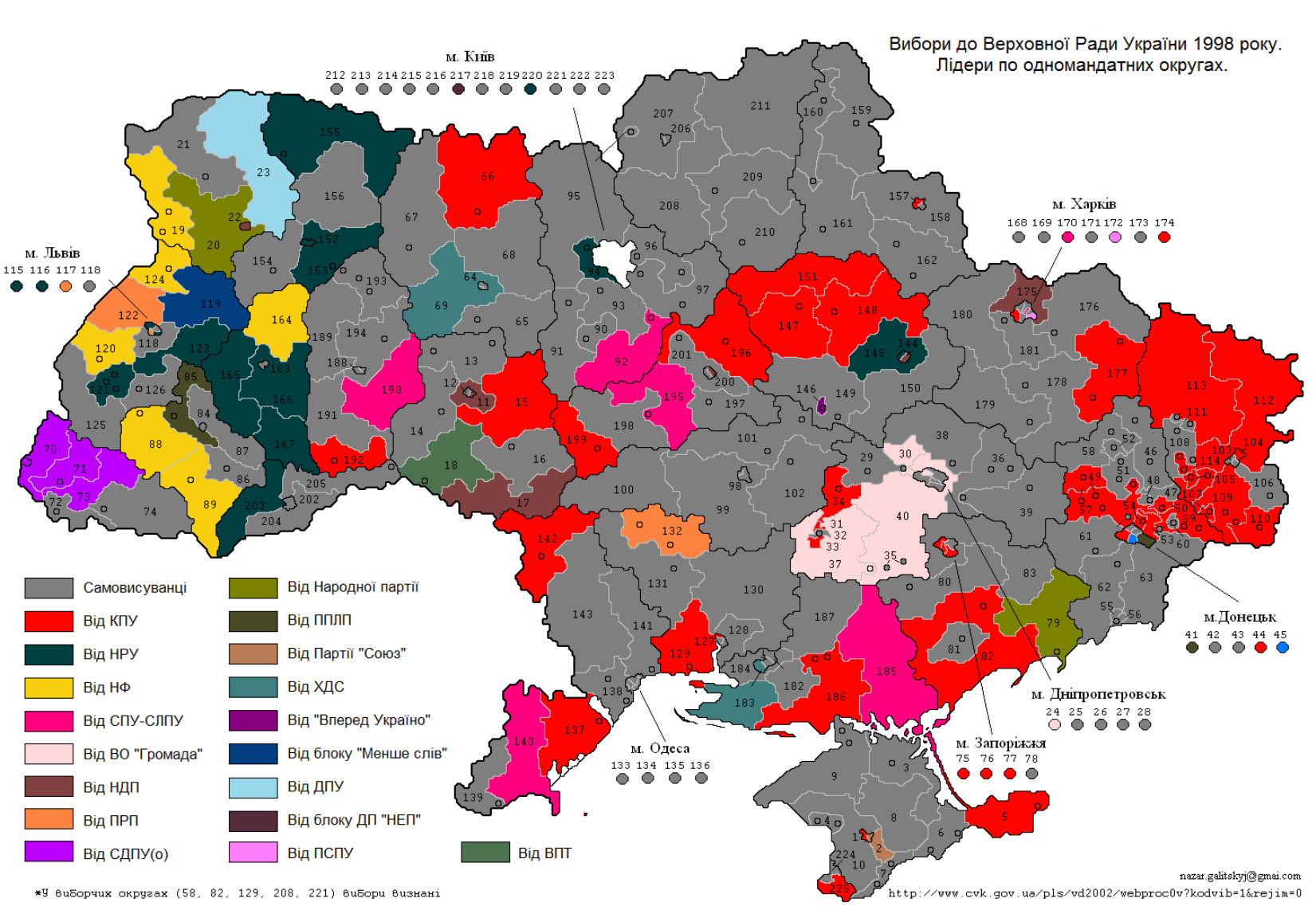
1998 Parliament

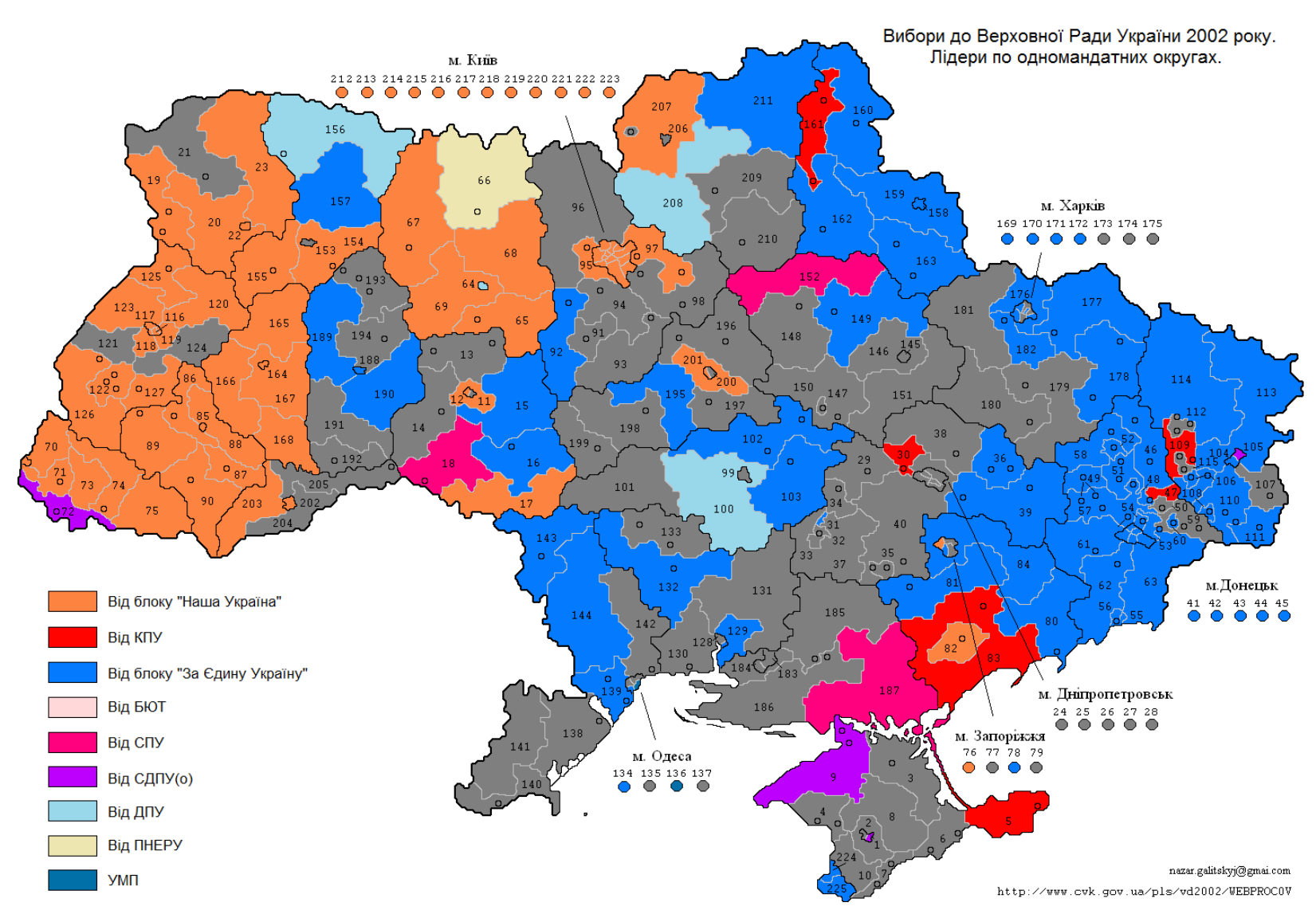
2002 Parliament

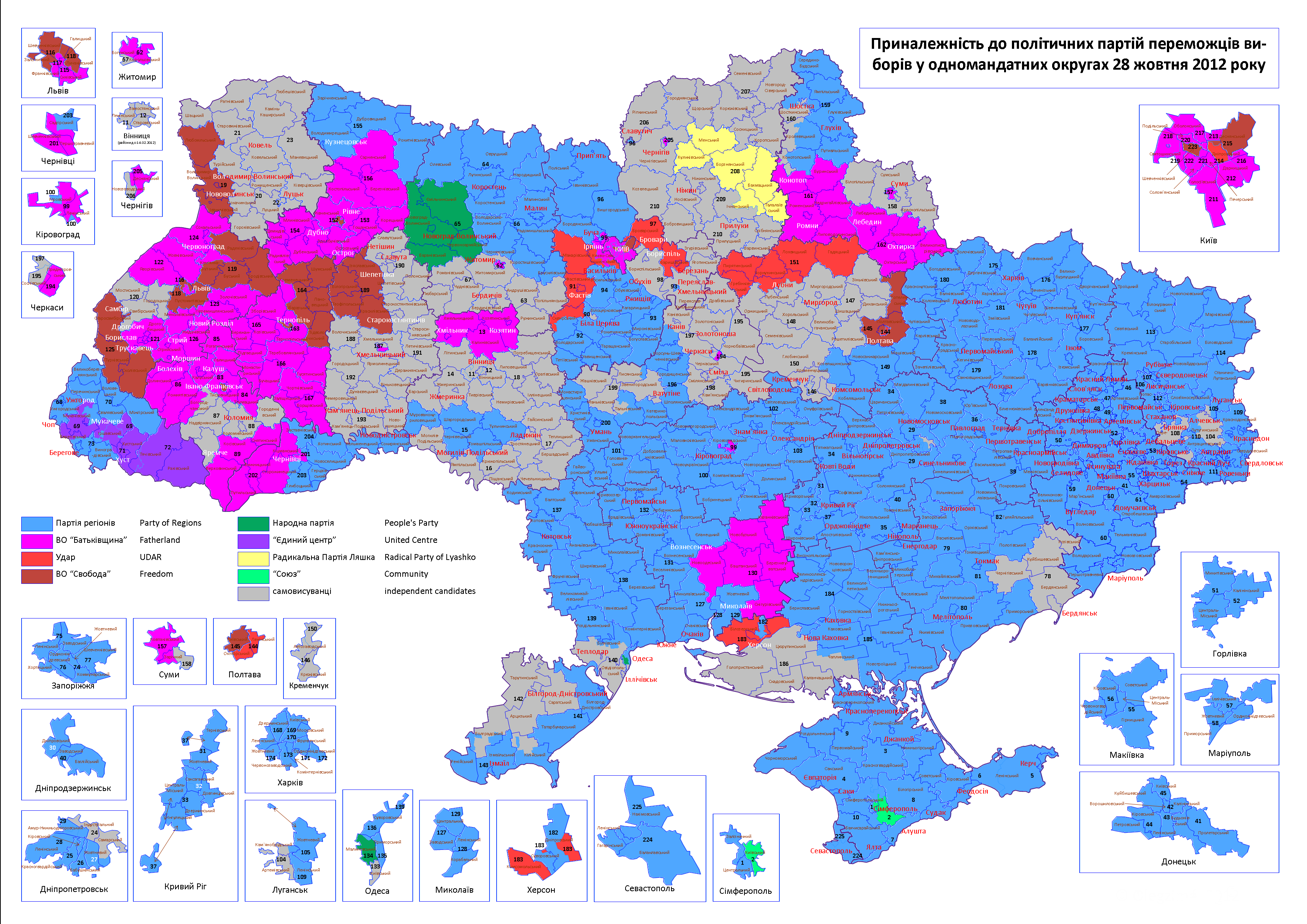
2012 Parliament

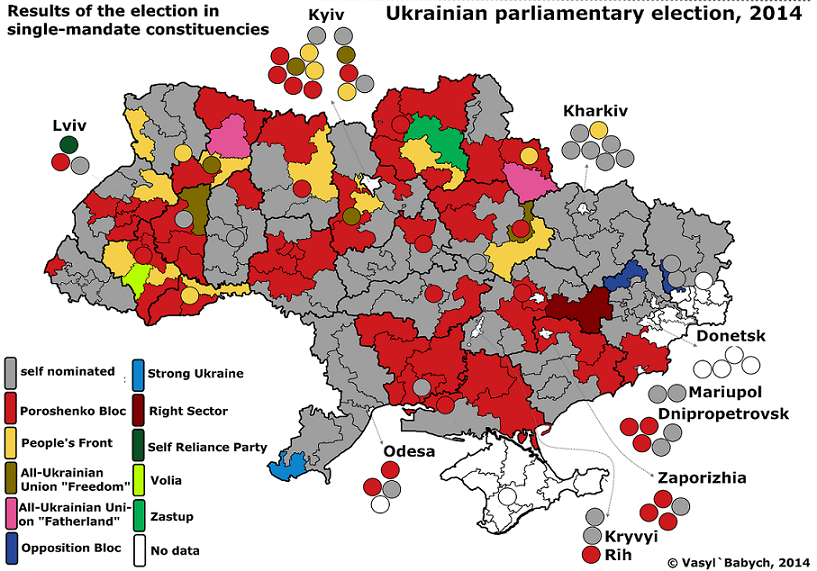
2014 Parliament

2019 Parliament

=== Presidential elections ===
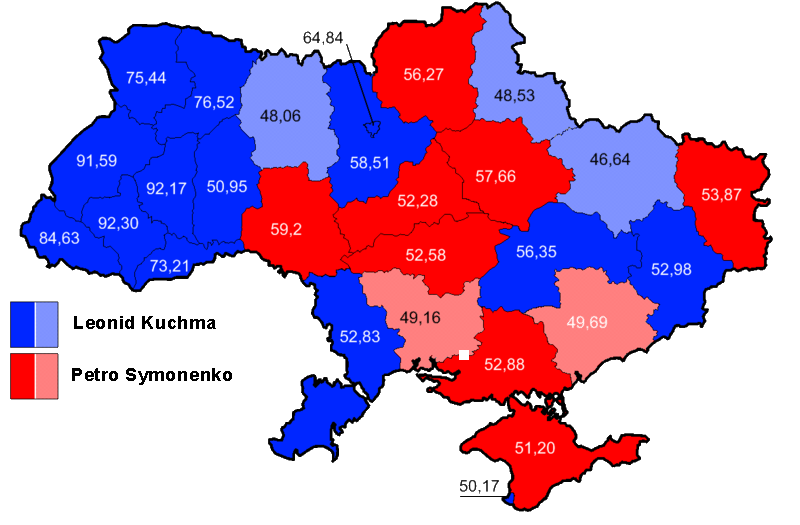
1999 President

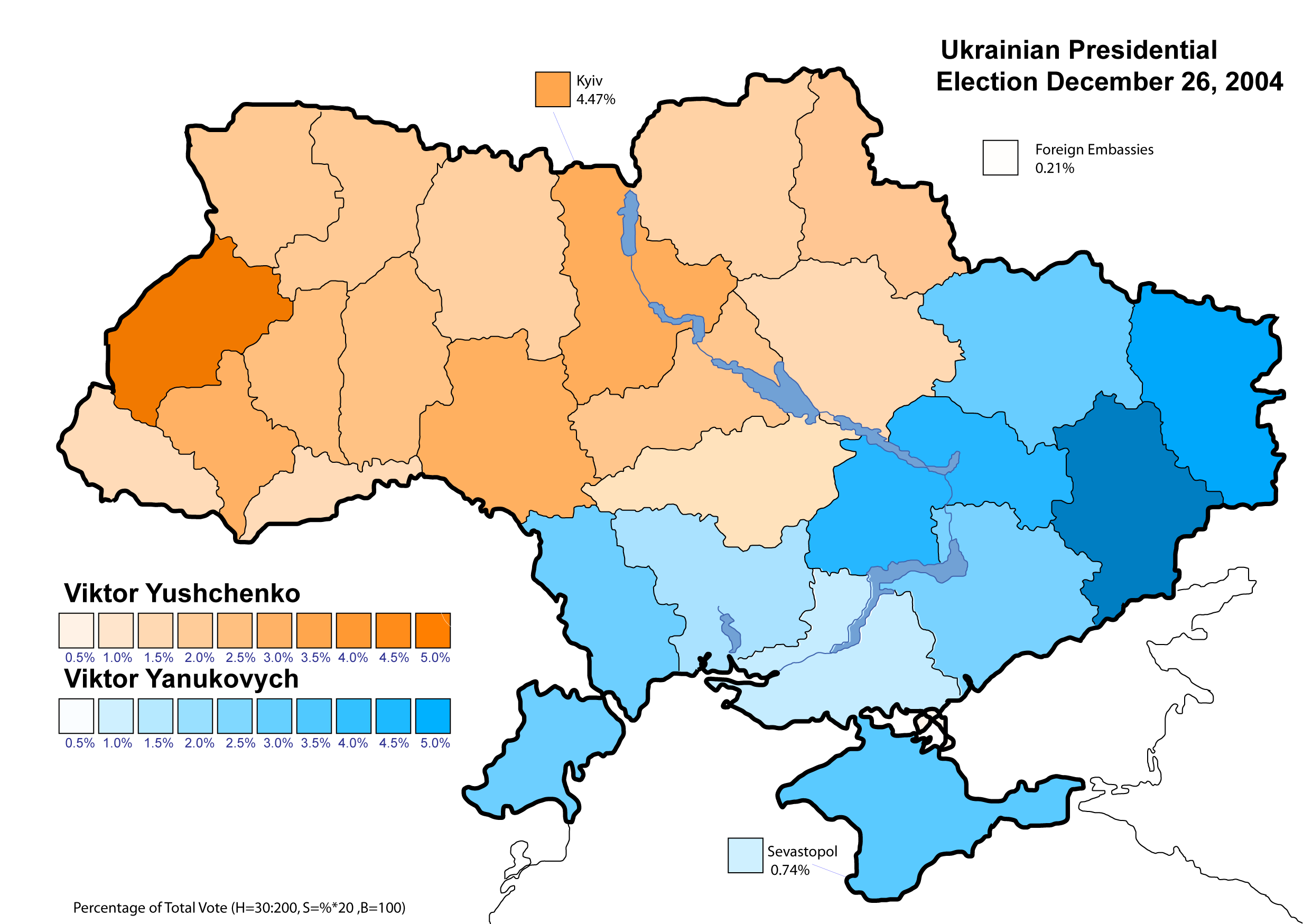
2004 President run-off

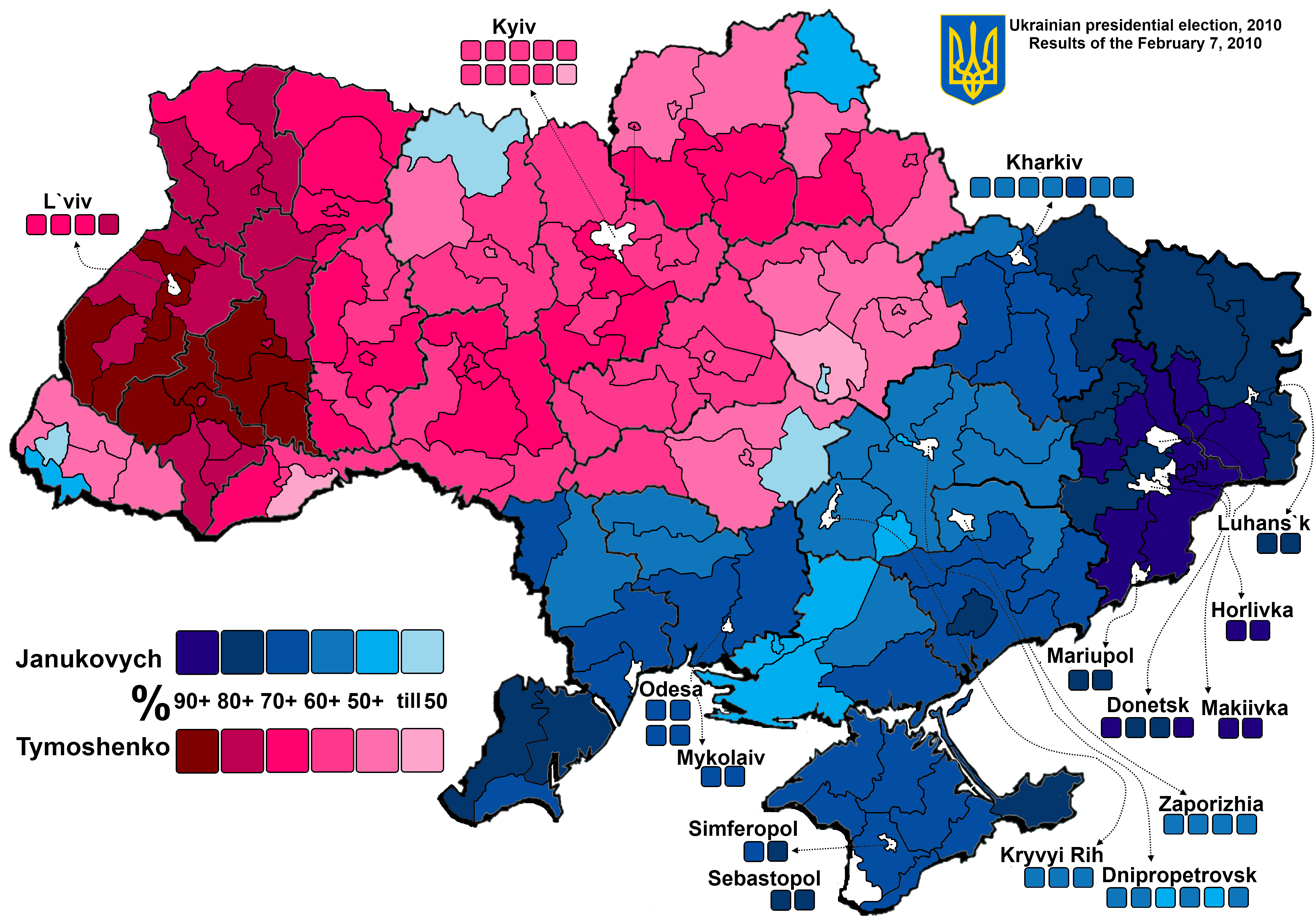
2010 President run-off

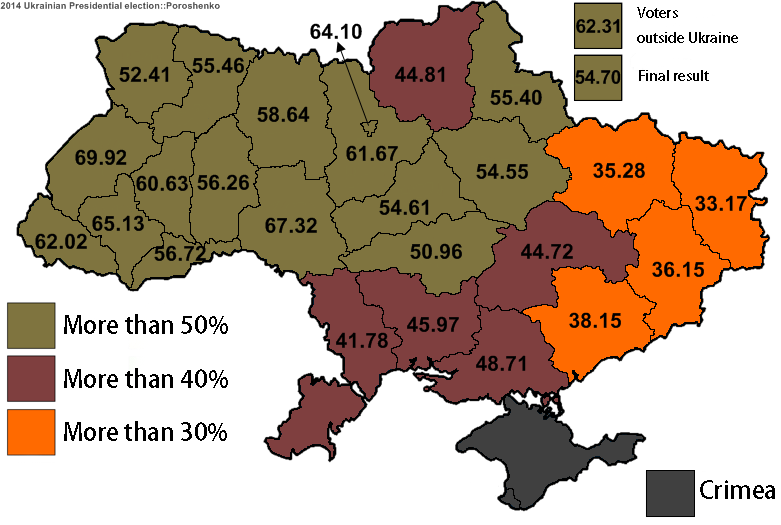
2014 President

2019 President run-off

== Voter turnout ==
From 1994 to 2007 the average voter turnout for the Verkhovna Rada elections was 68.13% The total voter turnout in the 2012 parliamentary elections was then the lowest ever with 57.99%; The lowest turnout in these elections was in Crimea (with 49.46%), the highest in Lviv Oblast (67.13%). In the 2014 parliamentary elections the official voter turnout was set (by the Central Election Commission of Ukraine) at 52.42%. This figure was determined after the Central Electoral Commission deducted the eligible voters in areas were voting was impossible. Because of the War in Donbas and the unilateral annexation of Crimea by Russia, the 2014 parliamentary elections were not held in Crimea and also not held in parts of Donetsk Oblast and Luhansk Oblast. The lowest turnout in these elections was in Donetsk Oblast (with 32.4%), the highest in again in Lviv Oblast (70%). According to Tadeusz Olszański, of the Centre for Eastern Studies, the low turnout in Donetsk Oblast (and also Luhansk Oblast) is explained by the end of an artificial increase of voter turnout there by Party of Regions officials.

Voter turnout in the presidential elections is always higher than for Verkhovna Rada elections with an average voter turnout of 72% from 2004 till 2010 (67.95% in the 2010 Presidential election). In the 2014 Presidential election the Central Election Commission of Ukraine set the turnout at over 60%; just as in the 2014 parliamentary elections, these elections were not held in Crimea and also not held in parts of Donetsk Oblast and Luhansk Oblast. The most popular presidential elections were the first one in 1991 where nearly 30.6 million people voted and in the 2004 election which gathered some 28 million. There were only three presidential candidates who have gathered over 10 million votes: Leonid Kravchuk (1991 - 19.6, 1994 - 10.0), Viktor Yushchenko (2004 - 11.1), and Viktor Yanukovych (2004 - 11.0). The 10 million voters mark was almost reached by Leonid Kuchma in 1999, but he only gained the trust of 9.6 million. To this day Kravchuk and Petro Poroshenko are the only presidential candidates who won the elections after the first round obtaining over 50% of votes, respective in 1991 and 2014. The person most frequently participating in presidential elections is Oleksandr Moroz who stood in every presidential election since 1994 when he gained the biggest support of some 3.5 million, while in 2010 less than 0.1 million voted for him. Viktor Yanukovych became the strongest runner-up in the history of presidential elections, while Leonid Kuchma - the only runner-up of the first round to pull a win in the second one. Thus far the top two presidential candidates always would get support of over 5 million voters each.

Since the 1994 Ukrainian parliamentary election voter turnouts have been declining. 1994 75.81%, 1998 70.78%, 2002 69.27%, 2006 67.55%, 2007 62.03%, 2012 57.43%, 2014 51.91% and the 2019 Ukrainian parliamentary election at 49.84%.

2010 President (first round)

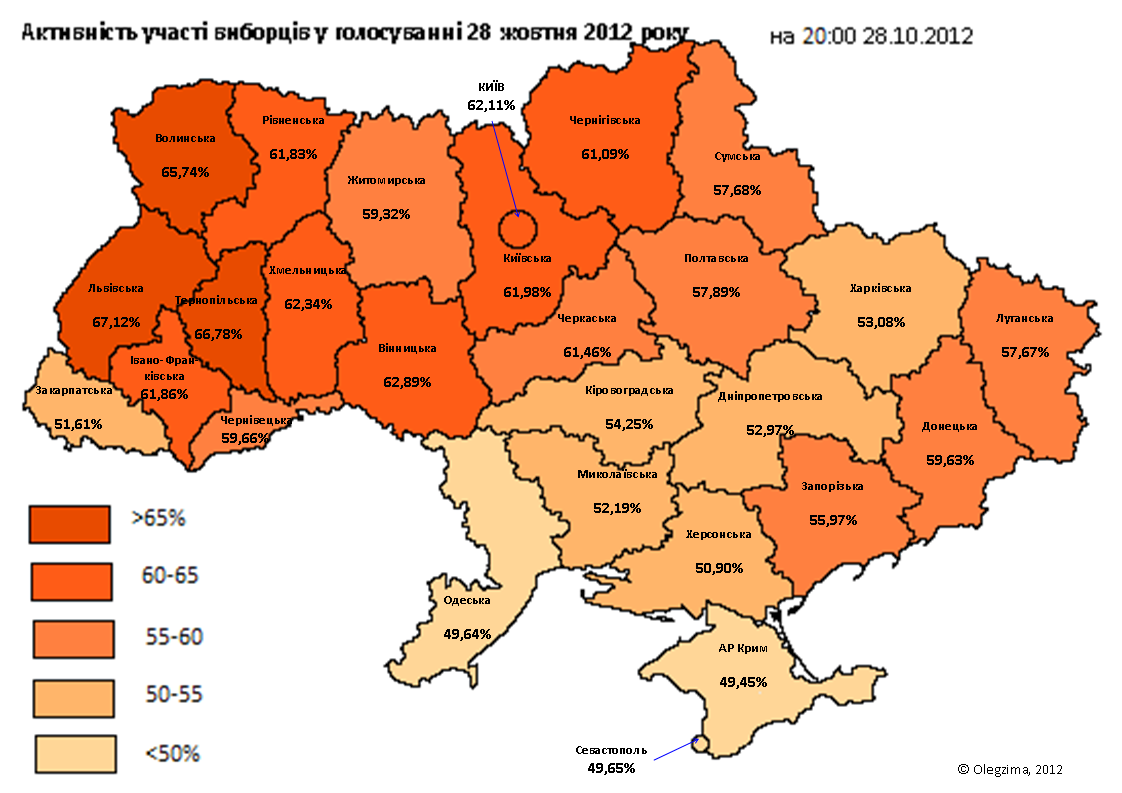
2012 Parliament

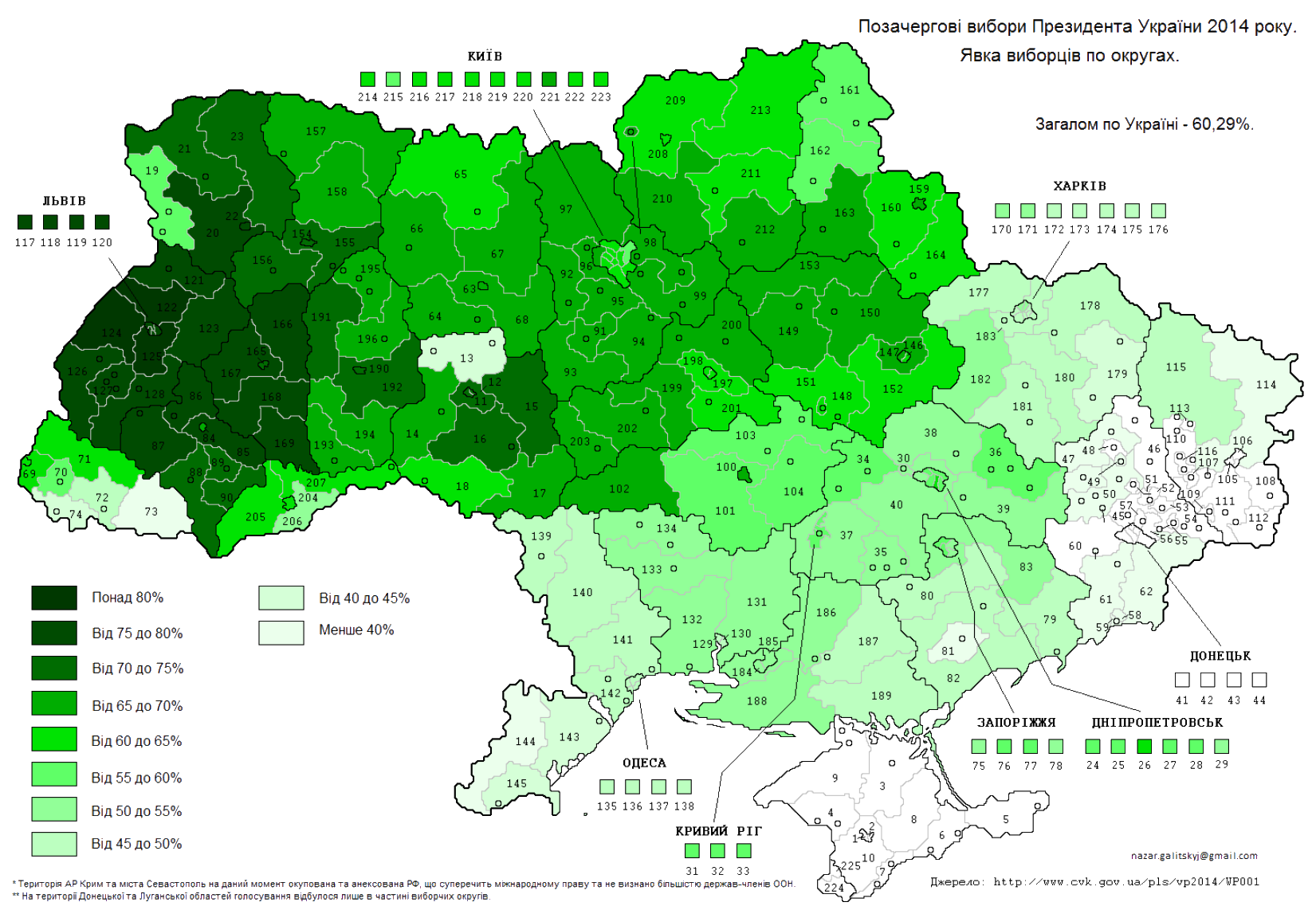
2014 President

2014 Parliament

2019 Parliament

== Perceived flaws in legislation ==
Despite a clear system for declaring donations to campaign funds, officials and experts say that Ukraine's election law is consistently flouted, with spending from candidates’ official funds representing only a fraction of the amount truly spent while it is rarely clear where the funding comes from.

Early May 2009, the "Committee of Voters of Ukraine" stated they believe that the use of the state's administrative resources by political forces for their own national and local election campaigns is no longer a decisive factor in the outcome of Ukrainian elections. According to a survey of 2,000 people conducted in October 2010 by two Ukrainian nongovernmental organizations, the Democratic Initiatives Fund and OPORA, one in five Ukrainians were willing to sell his or her vote in the then upcoming 2010 Ukrainian local elections. But according to (then) Ukrainian Prime Minister Mykola Azarov these elections "were absolutely without the use of administrative resources, naturally. Nobody interfered with our citizens."

== See also ==
- Electoral system
- Freedom of the press in Ukraine
- Electoral calendar
