= Order of Liberty (Ukraine) =

Highest possible Ukrainian Order that a foreign person may receive

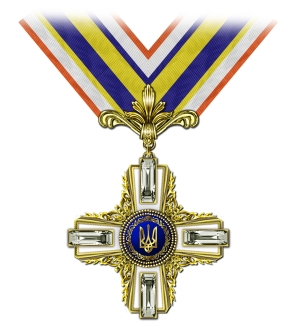
- Badge of the Order of Liberty

Awarded by Ukraine
- Type: Single-grade order
- Established: April 10, 2008
- Status: Active
- Grades: Member of the Order of Liberty (MOL)

Statistics
- Total inductees: 90

Precedence
- Next (higher): Cross of Military Merit
- Next (lower): Order of Prince Yaroslav the Wise
- Ribbon bar of the Order of Liberty

The Order of Liberty (Ukrainian: орден Свободи), also called the Order of Freedom, is an honour of Ukraine. The Order was instituted on April 10, 2008, by the Verkhovna Rada of Ukraine to honour special merits of citizens for strengthening the sovereignty and independence of Ukraine, consolidating Ukrainian society, developing democracy, advancing socio-economic and political reforms, and advocating the constitutional rights and liberties of man and citizen.

== History of the award ==
On August 18, 2005, President Viktor Yushchenko issued decree No. 1177/2005 which supported the proposal of the Commission on State Awards and Heraldry to establish the Order of Liberty to celebrate the special merits of citizens in establishing Ukraine's sovereignty and independence and developing democracy; the establishment of the medal "For Saved Lives" was also supported. The Commission on State Awards and Heraldry was instructed to hold an all-Ukrainian competition to develop designs for the Order of Freedom and the Medal for Saved Life within three months and to submit a bill amending the Law of Ukraine "On State Awards of Ukraine" based on its results.

On April 10, 2008, the Verkhovna Rada of Ukraine adopted the Law of Ukraine No. 258-VI "On Amendments to the Law of Ukraine" On State Awards of Ukraine, which established new state awards of Ukraine – the Order of Liberty and the Medal for Saved Life.

On May 20, 2008, President Yushchenko issued decree No. 460/2008 which approved the statute of the Order, which includes a description of the Order's badge.

On September 29, 2008, King Carl XVI Gustaf of Sweden became the first recipient.

== Statute of the Order ==
- Citizens of Ukraine, foreigners and stateless persons may be awarded the Order of Liberty.
- Awarding the Order of Liberty is carried out by a decree of the President of Ukraine.
- A person may not be awarded the Order of Liberty a second time.
- Awarding the Order of Liberty may be carried out posthumously.
- A person awarded the Order of Liberty is called a Knight of the Order of Liberty.
- Submission for the award of the Order of Freedom and presentation of this award is made in accordance with the procedure for submission for the award and presentation of state awards of Ukraine.
- A person awarded the Order of Liberty is awarded a badge of the order and an order book of the established pattern.

== Description of the Order of Liberty ==
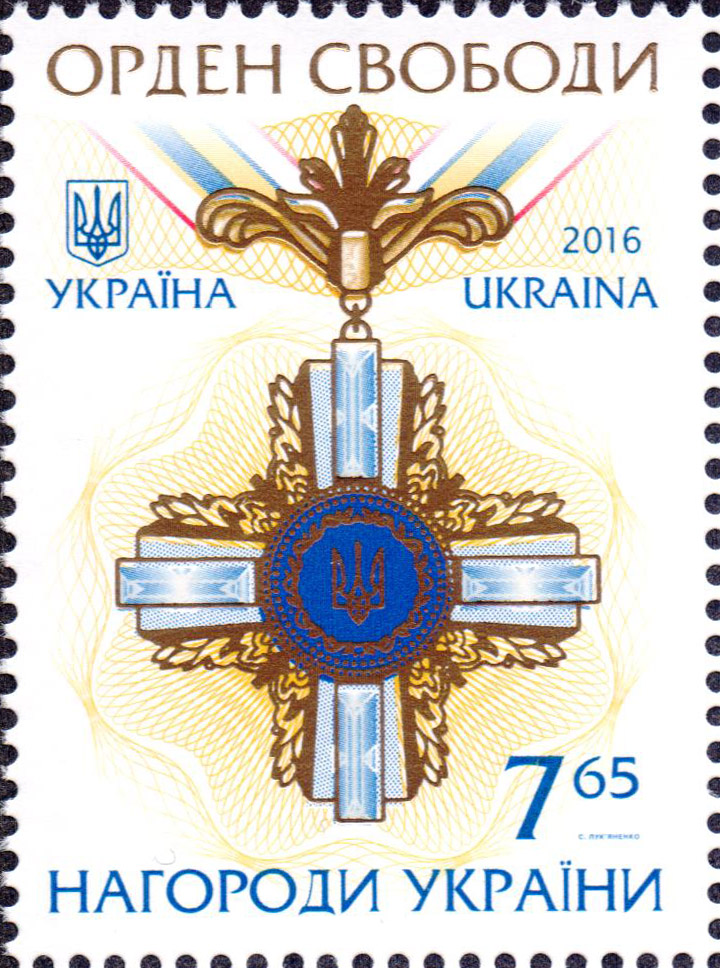
Stamp featuring Order of Liberty

The sign of the Order of Liberty is made of gilded silver and has the shape of an equilateral cross with diverging sides. The sides of the cross are covered with white enamel and decorated with four rectangular artificial Swarovski crystals. In the center of the cross is a round blue enamel medallion with a gold image of the Sign of the Princely State of Vladimir the Great, which is framed by a laurel wreath. The medallion is bordered by a double decorative strip. The sides of the corners of the cross are framed by stylized floral ornaments. All images are embossed.

The reverse side of the sign of the order is flat with the engraved number of the sign.

The size of the insignia between the opposite ends of the cross is 54 mm.

The emblem of the Order is connected with a decorative bar by means of a ring with an ear, which is the basis of the ribbon for wearing the insignia of the Order on the neck. The Order of Liberty is worn on the neckband and, if the winner has other orders of Ukraine, which are worn on the neckband, placed above them.

The strap is made of the same metal as the badge of the Order. White silk moire ribbon with longitudinal stripes – in the middle of wide blue and yellow, bordered on the edges by narrow stripes of yellow and blue, respectively, and on the edges of the ribbon by narrow strips of orange. The width of the tape is 28 mm, the width of wide strips of blue and yellow – 6 mm each, narrow strips of yellow and blue, as well as strips of orange – 2 mm each.

The bar of the order is a rectangular metal plate covered with ribbon. The size of a lath: height – 12 mm, width – 28 mm.

== Recipients ==
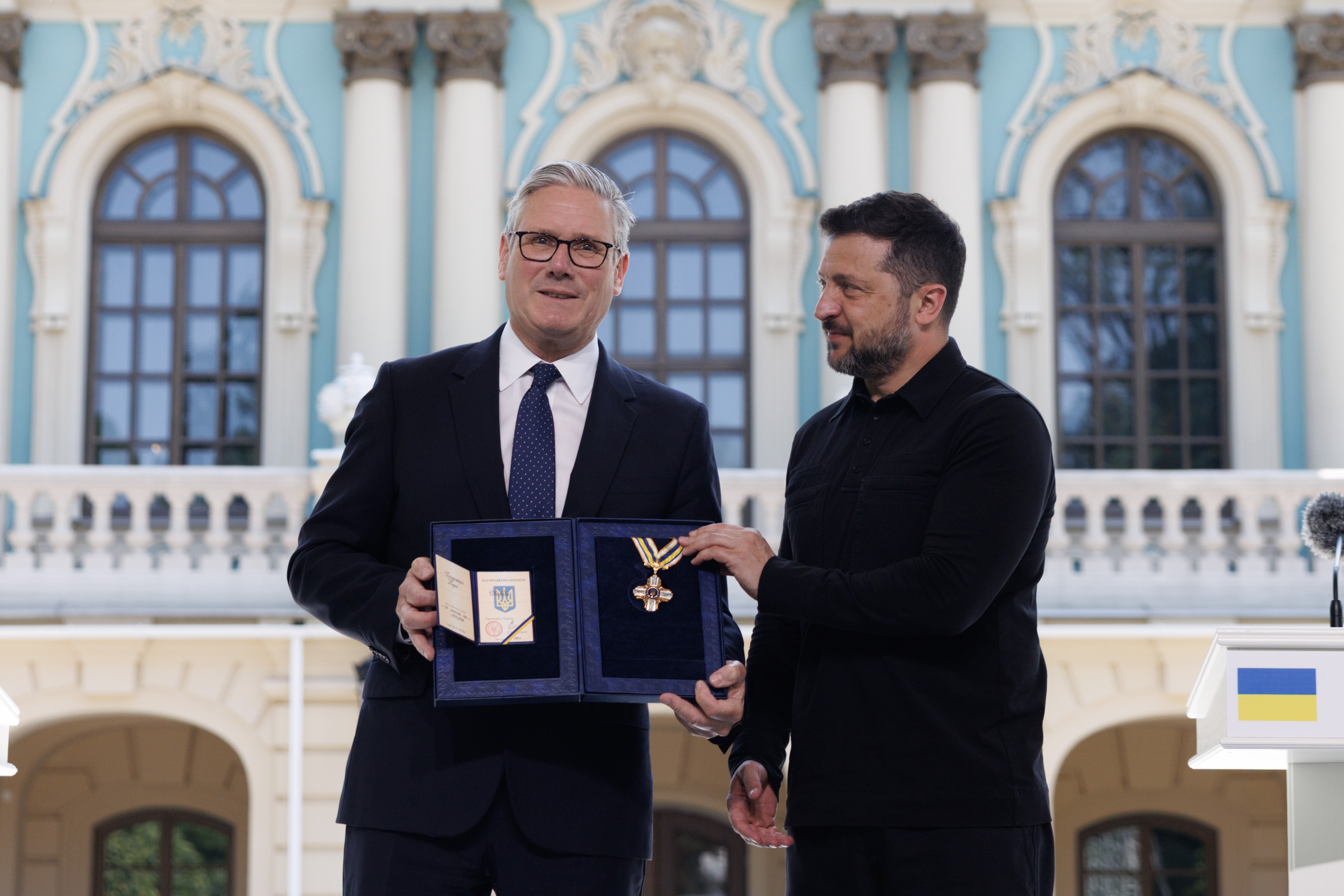
British Prime Minister Keir Starmer receives the Order of Liberty from President Volodymyr Zelenskyy in Kyiv, 16 July 2026

Since the creation of the Order of Liberty, there have been 90 recipients of the decoration. This first recipient was Carl XVI Gustaf of Sweden.

1. Carl XVI Gustaf of Sweden (2008)
2. (Ukraine) Yevhen Zakharov (2008)
3. (Ukraine) Yevhen Sverstyuk (2008)
4. (Ukraine) Stepan Khmara (2008)
5. (Ukraine) Myroslav Marynovych (2008)
6. (Ukraine) Mykhailo Horyn (2009)
7. (Ukraine) Ivan Dziuba (2009)
8. (Ukraine) Boris Oleynik (2009)
9. (Ukraine) Filaret (Denysenko) (2009)
10. (Ukraine) Petro Franco (2009)
11. (Lithuania) Valdas Adamkus (2009)
12. (Ukraine) Ihor Kalynets (2009)
13. (Ukraine) Oles Shevchenko (2009)
14. (Ukraine) Ivan Hel (2009)
15. (Ukraine) Mykola Horbal (2009)
16. (Ukraine) Athena-Svyatomyra Pashko (2009)
17. (Ukraine) Mykola Plakhotnyuk (2009)
18. (Ukraine) Vasyl Chervoniy (2009, posthumous)
19. (Brazil) Luiz Inácio Lula da Silva (2009)
20. (Ukraine) Roman Krutsyk (2010)
21. (Ukraine) Eugene Pronyuk (2010)
22. (Ukraine) Ivan Sokulsky (2010, posthumous)
23. (Kazakhstan) Nursultan Nazarbayev (2010)
24. (Ukraine) Volodymyr Sabodan (2010)
25. (Latvia) Valdis Zatlers (2011)
26. (Ukraine) Borys Paton (2012)
27. (Ukraine) Leonid Gubersky (2013)
28. (Mount Athos) (Turkey) Bartholomew I of Constantinople (2013)
29. (Azerbaijan) Ilham Aliyev (2013)
30. (Ukraine) Leonid Kravchuk (2014)
31. (NATO) (Denmark) Anders Fogh Rasmussen (2014)
32. (Ukraine) Dmytro Pavlychko (2015)
33. (Russia) Boris Nemtsov (2015, posthumous)
34. (Ukraine) Myroslav Symchych (2015)
35. (Portugal) José Manuel Barroso (2015)
36. (United States) George Soros (2015)
37. (Ukraine) Omelyan Koval (2015)
38. (Ukraine) Svyatoslav Vakarchuk (2016)
39. (Ukraine) Ivan Marchuk (2016)
40. (Ukraine) Yuriy Shcherbak (2016)
41. (Ukraine) Ihor Aleksandrov (2016, posthumous)
42. (Ukraine) Viktor Kuksa (2016)
43. (Ukraine) Vsevolod Stebliuk (2016)
44. (Canada) Stephen Harper (2016)
45. (United States) Richard Lugar (2016)
46. (United States) John McCain (2016)
47. (Canada) Bohdan Hawrylyshyn (2016)
48. (Slovenia) Borut Pahor (2016)
49. (Ukraine) Levko Lukyanenko (2016)
50. (Ukraine) Ihor Yukhnovskyi (2016)
51. (Ukraine) Volodymyr Kolinets (2017)
52. (Ukraine) Refat Chubarov (2017)
53. (United States) Joe Biden (2017)
54. (Germany) Joachim Gauck (2017)
55. (France) François Hollande (2017)
56. (Ukraine) Wladimir Klitschko (2017)
57. (Lithuania) Vytautas Landsbergis (2017)
58. (Ukraine) Yevhen Bystrytsky (2018)
59. (Ukraine) Myroslav Popovych (2018, posthumous)
60. (Ukraine) Mustafa Dzhemilev (2018)
61. (Ukraine) Serhiy Komisarenko (2018)
62. (Ukraine) Kyrylo Osmak (2018, posthumous)
63. (Lithuania) Dalia Grybauskaitė (2018)
64. (Ukraine) Pavlo Movchan (2018)
65. (Ukraine) Rostyslav Pavlenko (2019)
66. (Ukraine) Taras Petrynenko (2019)
67. (Ukraine) Stepan Klochurak (2019, posthumous)
68. (Ukraine) Anatoliy Matviyenko (2020, posthumous)
69. (Ukraine) Mykola Porovskiy (2020)
70. (Ukraine) Viktor Musiyaka (2021, posthumous)
71. (Ukraine) Mykhailo Syrota (2021, posthumous)
72. (Germany) Angela Merkel (2021)
73. (Ukraine) Sergey Bubka (2021)
74. (Ukraine) Yevhen Marchuk (2021, posthumous)
75. (United Kingdom) Boris Johnson (2022)
76. (United Kingdom) Rishi Sunak (2024)
77. (Argentina) Javier Milei (2024)
78. (Denmark) Mette Frederiksen (2024)
79. (Italy) Giorgia Meloni (2024)
80. (Canada) Justin Trudeau (2024)
81. (Ukraine) Oleksandr Usyk (2024)
82. (Ukraine) Olga Kharlan (2024)
83. (Poland) Andrzej Duda (2025)
84. (Ukraine) Tihran Ohannisyan (2025, posthumous)
85. (Ukraine) Mykyta Khanhanov (2025, posthumous)
86. (Ukraine) Victoria Roshchyna (2025, posthumous)
87. (Ukraine) Yuliia Paievska (2025)
88. (Ukraine) Vladyslav Heraskevych (2026)
89. (France) Emmanuel Macron (2026)
90. (Ukraine) Oleksandr Dubovyk (2026)
91. (Ukraine) Natalia Yakovenko (2026)
92. (United Kingdom) Keir Starmer (2026)
93. (Finland) Alexander Stubb (2026)
94. (United States) Elon Musk (2026)
