= Ukrainian Christian Democratic Party =

Ukrainian Christian Democratic Party Українська християнсько-демократична партія
- Leader: Vasyl Sichko
- Founded: 13 January 1989; 37 years ago
- Ideology: Christian democracy

Ukrainian Christian Democratic Party (Ukrainian: Українська християнсько-демократична партія, Ukrayinska Khrystyianska Demokratychna Partiya; UKhDP) is a small political party of Ukrainian SSR and Ukraine. It became a progenitor of the two other parties of Christian democracy such Christian Democratic Party of Ukraine and Christian Democratic Union. The party became a powerful force in Ukraine during the 1989 revolutionary wave in Europe and contributed greatly to the revival of such Ukrainian cultural organizations as Prosvita, Association of the Ukrainian Language, Plast as well as the Ukrainian Greek Catholic Church.

In 1992 most of the party was transformed into the Christian Democratic Party of Ukraine of Vitaliy Zhuravsky, while the remnants existed until 2002 and according to some sources were merged with the Ukrainian Republican Party Sobor.

== Historical outlook ==
=== Establishment ===
In November 1988 in Dolyna was conducted assembly where former political prisoners Vasyl Sichko and Petro Sichko, members of the Ukrainian Helsinki Group, who adapted the first program and statute of the Ukrainian Christian Democratic Front. On November 14, 1988, Vasylko Sichko submitted the statute and program of the party to the Supreme Council of the Soviet Union for registration. On January 13, 1989, in Lviv took place the constituent congress of the Ukrainian Christian Democratic Front, head of which was elected Vasylko Sichko.

On April 21–22, 1990 in Lviv took place the second congress of the Ukrainian Christian Democratic Front where it was officially renamed in the Ukrainian Christian Democratic Party. The number of members in 1990 accounted for around 2,000 people, while the party's cells were mostly located in the Western Ukraine. By 1991 there were legally established and well organized party organizations of Ivano-Frankivsk and Ivano-Frankivsk Oblast, Lviv Oblast, Ternopil region and city. Much smaller offices (under 15 members) were also located in Khmelnytskyi, Cherkasy, Kyiv, Odessa, and Vinnytsia. During that period sessions of the main governing council were not conducted that would provide a single monolith political strategy of the party and regional organizations acted on its own initiative. In June 1991 on official invitation of the Austrian political academy to the head of Lviv Oblast organization Mykola Boiko, several members of the UKhDP along with Viktor Pynzenyk (instructor at the Lviv University) were sent to Vienna for study. It was the first international recognition of the Ukrainian Christian Democratic Party, yet it also created a drift between the party leader Sichko and the Lviv Oblast party leader Boiko. Eventually, in retaliation Sichko excluded Boiko from the party.

=== Split ===
On November 16, 1991, took place the third report-electoral conference of the Lviv Oblast organization of UKhDP, at which Boiko has officially resigned. While visiting the conference, Sichko protested and pointed to the fact that Boiko was already excluded from the party. The conference without addressing the Sichko's protest continued on and elected its new governing body. The new chairman of the Lviv oblast organization was elected former political prisoner Mykhailo Viter. Another former political prisoner Ivan Hel spoke very critical about Sichko actions. He pointed to the fact that Sichko denied in membership such people like Stepan Khmara (later the leader of the Ukrainian Conservative Republican Party), Mykhailo Horyn and many others. Ivan Hel said that in July 1991 he received an invitation from the Secretary General of the Christian Democratic International, Andre Louis, where for the purpose of establish relationship he asked to have the delegation not to include mister Vasyl Sichka. Negatively to the family of Sichko referred also His Beatitude Myroslav Ivan Lubachivsky.

Rejection of the 3rd report-electoral conference of the UKhDP Lviv regional organization by head of UKhDP Vasyl Sichko led to the split in the organization. On December 10, 1991, the UKhDP Ternopil regional organization conducted its general council which recognized the legitimacy of the Lviv regional organization and the election of Mykhailo Viter, the head of the UKhDP Lviv regional organization and it also approved that cooperation and inter-relationship will only occur with the UKhDP Lviv regional organization headed by Mykhailo Viter.

== See also ==
- Prosvita
- Plast
