= Referendums in Ukraine =

Referendums in Ukraine, according to the Ukrainian Constitution, are one of the lawful forms of expression of people's will.

Referendums are organized by population initiative of no less than 3 million voters. The referendums are designated by either the Parliament or the President. Any change to the territory of Ukraine can be resolved solely by a national referendum.

== Referendum of independence, 1991 ==
On December 1, 1991, a referendum, initiated by parliament of Ukraine, took place. On August 26, 1991, the parliament adopted the Declaration of Independence of Ukraine, and the referendum was called with a question: "Do you support the Declaration of Independence of Ukraine". Of registered voters, 84.18% participated in the referendum, and 90.32% of them answered "Yes".

== Referendum of Kuchma, 2000 ==
On April 16, 2000, an All-Ukrainian referendum took place, which was called by the President Kuchma upon population initiative. Four questions were brought up:

- On conditions for dissolution of the parliament
- On immunity of a deputy
- On decrease of the number of parliament deputies
- On introduction of two-chamber parliament

The majority of citizens answered "Yes" on all four questions.

- Questions of the referendum (in Ukrainian)
- Results of the referendum (in Ukrainian)

== Referendums on NATO and Common Economic Space ==
In December 2006, the Central Electoral Committee of Ukraine recognized as valid more than 3 million voters' signatures which were collected in the call for the Referendum on Ukraine joining NATO, and for the Referendum on Ukraine joining Common Economic Space (with Russia, Belarus, and Kazakhstan). The Committee officially informed the President of Ukraine of their decision. It's expected that the President or the Parliament should schedule the referendums. No financing was reserved for the organization of referendums in 2007 State Budget of Ukraine. The signature collection in the call for the referendum was organized by the United Social Democratic Party of Ukraine. .

A Gallup poll conducted in October 2008 showed that 43% of Ukrainians associated NATO as a threat to their country, while only 15% associated it with protection. A November 2009 poll by Ukrainian Project System relieved 40.1% of Ukrainians polled said the Collective Security Treaty Organization (CSTO) was the best global security group for Ukraine to be a part of and 33.9% of the respondents supported Ukraine's full membership in CSTO; more than 36% of the respondents of the poll said that Ukraine should remain neutral and only 12.5% supported Ukraine's accession to NATO. A 2009 Gallup poll showed that 40% of Ukrainian adults associate NATO with "Threat" and 17% with "Protection". According to a poll by Razumkov Center in March 2011 20.6% on average across Ukraine considered NATO a threat; this number was 51% in Crimea. A 2013 Gallup poll showed that 29% associated NATO with "Threat" and 17% with "Protection"; 44% viewed it as neither.

In February 2014, President Yanukovych fled Ukraine amid the Euromaidan uprising. As a result of this revolution, the interim Yatsenyuk Government came to power in Ukraine. The Yatsenyuk Government initially stated it did not have the intention of making Ukraine a member of NATO. However, the start of the Russo-Ukrainian War caused many Ukrainians to change their views of NATO: polls from the middle of 2014 until 2016 showed that the majority of Ukrainians supported NATO membership. Following parliamentary elections in October 2014, the new government made joining NATO a priority. On 29 December 2014 Ukrainian President Petro Poroshenko (elected president on 25 May 2014) vowed to hold a referendum on joining NATO.

NATO officials vowed support for Ukraine and worked to downplay tensions between the bloc and Russia, which refused to recognize the impeachment of Yanukovych or the Yatsenyuk Government. In late February 2014, Anders Fogh Rasmussen, Secretary General of NATO, reaffirmed that NATO membership is still an option for Ukraine.

Western Ukraine has always been significantly more pro-NATO than the rest of the country; Eastern Ukraine is far more anti-NATO and pro-Russia than the rest of Ukraine.

Popular support in Ukraine for NATO membership since 2000

2020–2025
Date	Opinion		Poll agency
Date	For	Against	Poll agency
September 2025	82.9%	11.1%	Razumkov Centre
February 2024	77%	5%	International Republican Institute & Rating
November 2023	77%	5%	Rating
September 2023	79%	5%	International Republican Institute
July 2023	83%	6%	Rating
May 2023	89%	3%	Kyiv International Institute of Sociology
February 2023	82%	3%	International Republican Institute & Rating
January 2023	86%	14%	National Democratic Institute
January 2023	86%	3%	Rating
October 2022	83%	4%	Rating
July 2022	71%	7%	Kyiv International Institute of Sociology
June 2022	76%	10%	Rating
June 2022	72%	7%	International Republican Institute & Rating
April 2022	59%	14%	International Republican Institute & Rating
April 2022	68%	23%	Rating
March 2022	72%	12%	Rating
January 2022	64%	17%	Ukrainian Institute of the Future
December 2021	59.2%	28.1%	Kyiv International Institute of Sociology
August 2021	54%	35%	Rating
June 2021	47.8%	24.3%	Kyiv International Institute of Sociology
February 2020	43.5%	31.3%	Kyiv International Institute of Sociology
January 2020	49.8%	29.8%	Razumkov Centre

2014–2019
Date	Opinion		Poll agency
Date	For	Against	Poll agency
June 2019	53%	29%	Rating
September 2018	45%	31%	International Republican Institute & Rating
September 2018	46.3%	31.6%	Razumkov Centre
March 2018	43%	33%	International Republican Institute & Rating
December 2017	37%	26%	International Republican Institute & Rating
September 2017	45%	27%	Kyiv International Institute of Sociology
June 2017	40%	27%	International Republican Institute & Rating
April 2017	46%	27%	International Republican Institute & Rating
December 2016	71%	23%	Democratic Initiatives Foundation & Razumkov Centre
September 2016	39%	31%	Kyiv International Institute of Sociology
June 2016	39%	32%	Rating
May 2016	44%	38%	Kyiv International Institute of Sociology
March 2016	45%	30%	Rating
January 2016	47%	31%	Rating
December 2015	75%	11%	Democratic Initiatives Foundation
July 2015	63.9%	28.5%	Democratic Initiatives Foundation & Razumkov Centre
June 2015	53%	32%	Pew Research Center
March 2015	43.3%	33.4%	Kyiv International Institute of Sociology
November 2014	51%	25%	Rating
October 2014	53%	34%	Gorshenin Institute
July 2014	44%	34%	Rating
June 2014	47%	36%	Gorshenin Institute
June 2014	41%	40%	Razumkov Centre
May 2014	41%	40%	Democratic Initiatives Foundation & Razumkov Centre
May 2014	37%	42%	Razumkov Centre
April 2014	36%	48%	Razumkov Centre
March 2014	44%	47%	GfK

2000–2013
Date	Opinion		Poll agency
Date	For	Against	Poll agency
October 2013	20%	66%	Rating
December 2012	15%	60%	Democratic Initiative Foundation
October 2012	19%	66%	Rating
July 2012	17%	70%	Rating
April 2012	15%	62%	Democratic Initiative Foundation
February 2012	20%	70%	Rating
April 2011	25%	60%	IFAK Ukraine
January 2011	24%	70%	Rating
December 2009	21%	60%	Democratic Initiative Foundation
April 2009	21%	57%	FOM-Ukraine
June 2002	32%	32.2%	Razumkov Centre
November 2000	30%	40%	Institute of Public Affairs, Poland

On 29 August 2015, Baturyn Andrii posted an electronic petition No.22/000052 to the president of Ukraine Petro Poroshenko requesting to run a referendum to join NATO. Petition achieved required 25 000 of votes to be considered. President reply mentions that "One of the main priorities of Ukraine's foreign policy is to deepen cooperation with NATO to achieve the criteria required for membership in this organization. Today we carry out security sector reform in Ukraine to reach NATO standards and to strengthen the country's defense system, which is necessary to counter Russian aggression. Once Ukraine fulfills all the necessary criteria to join the Alliance, final decision on this important issue will be approved by the Ukrainian people in a referendum".

In February 2017, President Poroshenko announced a referendum (given polls that show 54 percent of Ukrainians favor such a move) to be held during his presidency.

== See also ==
- Elections in Ukraine
- Constitution of Ukraine
