= Republican Platform =

Republican Platform Республіканська платформа
- Leader: Oleh Pavlyshyn
- Founded: 1990
- Headquarters: Kyiv
- Ideology: Liberal conservatism Civic nationalism
- Political position: Centre-right
- Colours: Blue
- Verkhovna Rada: 0 / 450

Website
- http://republican-platform.org/

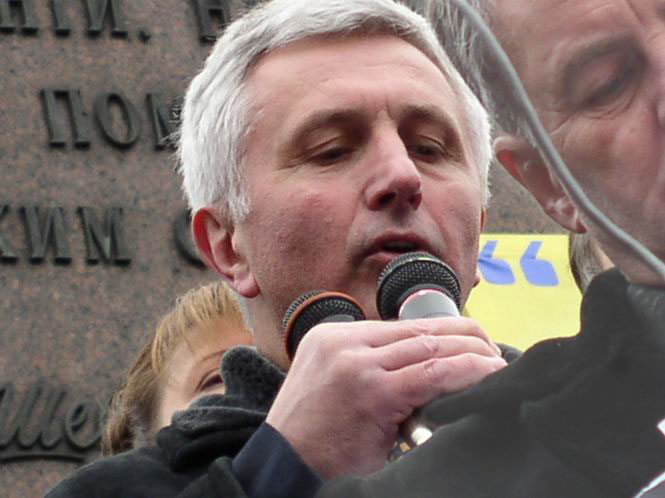
Anatoliy Matviyenko (2003), a party leader 1999-2011.

Old logo

Republican Platform (Ukrainian: Республіканська платформа, romanized: Respublikanska platforma) is a political party in Ukraine. It was the first registered political party in Ukraine, created on November 5, 1990 by the Ministry of Justice of UkrSSR. RP was founded earlier that year in place of the Ukrainian Helsinki Group in April 1990.

== Previous names ==
- 1990 – 2002: Ukrainian Republican party
- 2002 – 2011: Ukrainian Republican Party "Sobor" (Ukrainian: Українська республіканська партія „Собор“, romanized: Ukrainska respublikanska partiia „Sobor“)
- 2011 – 2015: Ukrainian Platform "Sobor"
- 2015: Republican platform

== History ==
November 1976 – Ukrainian community groups was established to promote the implementation of the Helsinki agreements. Almost all members of this Ukrainian Helsinki Group were subsequently repressed; four of them (V. Stus, Yu. Lytvyn, O. Tykhyi, V. Marchenko) died in Soviet camps.

March 1988 – Ukrainian Helsinki Union (UKhS) was formed. Since 1989, UKhS has moved to open propaganda activity, promoting the independence of Ukraine.

April 29–30, 1990 – Ukrainian Republican Party (URP) was established in the place of the UKhS. The party was registered on November 5, 1990 by the Ministry of Justice of the Ukrainian SSR as the first political party in Ukraine.

A 1992 split in the party resulted in the creation of the rival Ukrainian Conservative Republican Party (UKRP) led by Stepan Khmara.

In the 1994 parliamentary elections the URP core party obtained nine seats initially, adding three more by the end of the year.

During the 1998 Ukrainian parliamentary election the party was part (together with Congress of Ukrainian Nationalists & Ukrainian Conservative Republican Party) of the Election Bloc "National Front" (Ukrainian: Виборчий блок партій «Національний фронт») which won 2,71% of the national votes and 6 (single-mandate constituency) seats. In January 2001 the "National Front" parliamentary faction had grown to 17 deputies.

After being part of the National Salvation Committee the party became part of the Yulia Tymoshenko Electoral Bloc alliance during the Ukrainian 2002 parliamentary elections. On April 21, 2002 the party merged with the Ukrainian People's Party "Sobor" as the Ukrainian Republican Party "Sobor".

Date	Event
Spring 1999	Creation of the All-Ukrainian Union "Open Politics" (by members of the People's Democratic Party). The main goal of the Union was the consolidation of all national-democratic forces and patriotic forces for the sake of building the Ukrainian sovereign democratic state and opposition to the re-election of the President Leonid D. Kuchma. The Chairman of the Union, Anatoliy Matviyenko.
Summer 1999	Statement on creation of a National Democratic Party was released on June 19 and signed by the Forward, Ukraine!, Democratic Party of Ukraine, People Movement of Ukraine (Kostenko), All-Ukrainian Union Open Politics, Liberal-Democratic Party of Ukraine
Fall 1999	Declaration on creation of the united party was signed on November 10 by the All-Ukrainian Union Open Politics, parliamentary group of Liberal-Democratic Party of Ukraine, parliamentary faction of Democratic Party of Ukraine, Ukrainian Party Unity, Ukrainian Republican Party, Christian Democratic Union
Winter 1999	Establishment of Ukrainian People's Party "Assembly" on December 25 (registration on March 9, 2000) based on the All-Ukrainian Union Open Politics
1999 – 2000	Along with the Ukrainian Republican Party, "Assembly" initiates the anti-presidential protest action Ukraine without Kuchma
Summer 2001	Establishment of "Forum of National Salvation" (later known as the Bloc of Yulia Tymoshenko) based on Ukrainian People's Party "Assembly", Ukrainian Republican Party, Ukrainian Christian Democratic Party (later merged with Christian Democratic Union), Ukrainian Conservative Republican Party, All-Ukrainian Union "Fatherland", Ukrainian Social Democratic Party
Spring 2002	Participation in the 2002 parliamentary election as part of the Bloc of Yulia Tymoshenko. On April 21 "Sobor" officially merged with Ukrainian Republican Party of the same bloc into new party Ukrainian Republican Party "Sobor". Into the new Ukrainian Republican Party "Sobor" was merged the Ukrainian Christian Democratic Party.
Fall 2004	Support for Viktor Yushchenko at the 2004 Ukrainian presidential election. As part of Bloc of Yulia Tymoshenko and Our Ukraine created pre-election coalition "Power of People" in support of Viktor Yushchenko
2005 – 2006	Conflict with Levko Lukyanenko and assuming full rights on the name of Ukrainian Republican Party; Participation in the 2006 parliamentary election as part of the Our Ukraine Levko Lukyanenko was forced to re-create the original Ukrainian Republican Party as Ukrainian Republican Party of Levko Lukyanenko. Both parties claimed their heritage to the original Ukrainian Republican Party (URP).
Fall 2007	Participation in the 2007 parliamentary election as part of the Our Ukraine–People's Self-Defense Bloc
Fall 2008	Political dialog with the European Liberal Democrat and Reform Party
Winter 2011	Name change to Ukrainian Platform Party

On 15 October 2012 the party withdrew itself from the national list of the 2012 Ukrainian parliamentary election. In the election it did not win any constituencies (it had competed in 12 constituencies) and thus failed to win parliamentary representation.

In the 2014 Ukrainian parliamentary election the participated in 6 constituencies; but its candidates lost in all of them and thus the party won no parliamentary seats.

== Local elections ==
=== 2010 ===
In the 2010 local elections the party won a few representatives in 3 regional parliaments, all in Western Ukraine.

== Elections ==
Presidential since 2004 (year links to election page)
Year	Candidate	Votes	%
2004	Viktor Yushchenko	15,115,712	51.99
2010	Yulia Tymoshenko	11,593,357	45.47

Parliamentary since 2002 (year links to election page)
Year	Votes	%	Mandates	Notes
2002	1,882,087	7.26	22	part of Yulia Tymoshenko Bloc
2006	3,539,140	13.95	81	part of Our Ukraine
2007	3,301,282	14.15	72	part of Our Ukraine
2012	TBA	TBA	TBA	independently
