= Solidarity of Women of Ukraine =

Ukrainian political party registered in 1999

Solidarity of Women of Ukraine (Ukrainian: Солідарність жінок України, romanized: Solidarnist zhinok Ukrainy) is a Ukrainian political party that was registered on 23 December 1999.

The party was created based on the public organization "All-Ukrainian Female Union Solidarity" that existed since 1994. Solidarity of Women of Ukraine participated in parliamentary elections for the first time in 2002, but did not win any seats. In 2004 it supported Viktor Yanukovych as a presidential candidate. In 2006 the party participated in the electoral bloc "Yevhen Marchuk - Unity" which won 0.06% and Solidarity of Women of Ukraine did not receive any representation in parliament.

In 2014 Solidarity received 0.66% on the party list voting and did not win any constituencies.

In the 2015 Ukrainian local elections several candidates of the party ran for local councils. For the party Marina Petrosyanc took part in the mid-term election held in single-member district 51 in 2016. However, this election was won by Ruslan Bogdan for Batkivshchyna. The party has not taken part in any subsequent election.
