= Rostyslav Pavlenko =

Ukrainian politician

- Ростислав Павленко
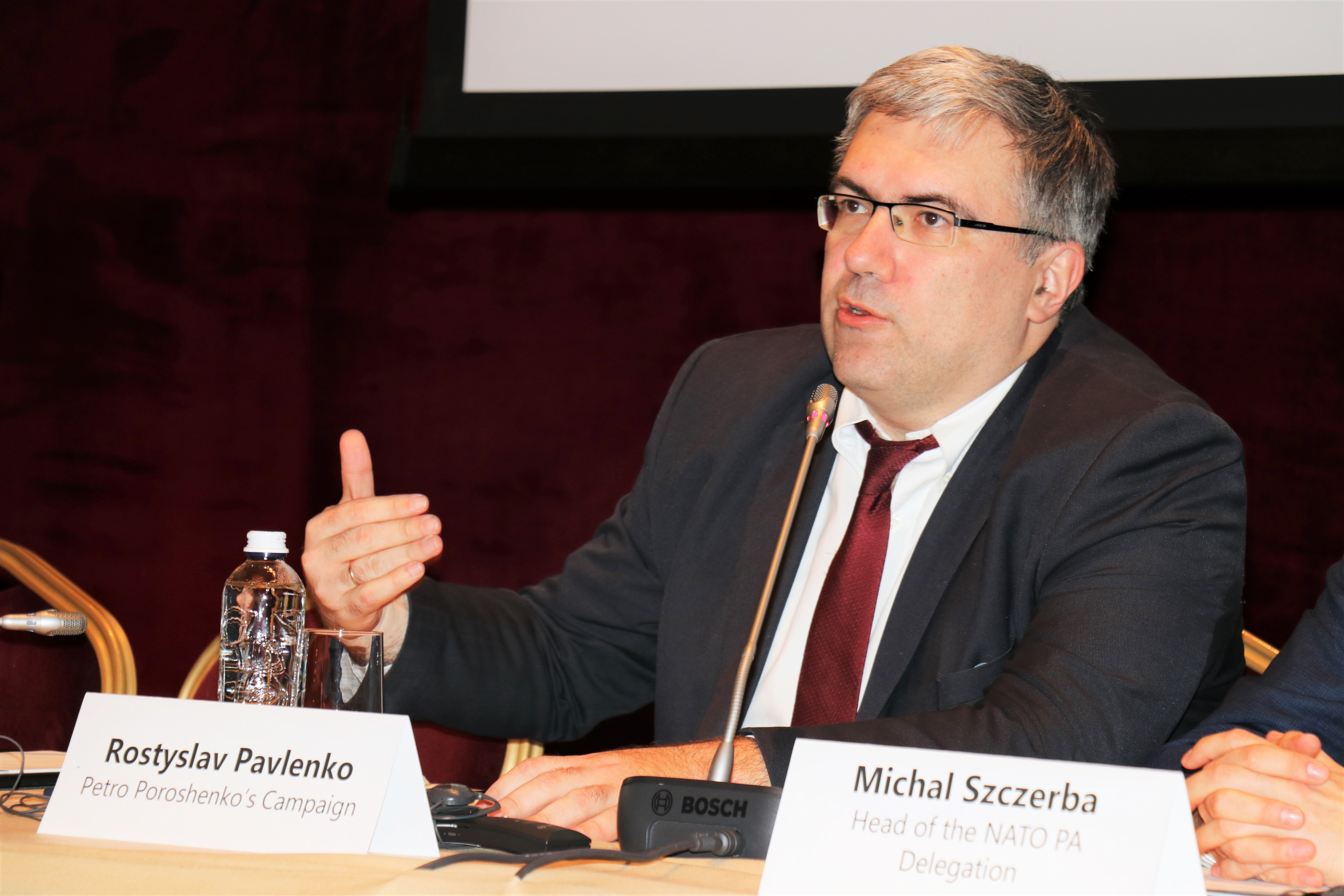
- Pavlenko in 2019

People's Deputy of Ukraine
- Incumbent
- Assumed office December 2012
- Parliamentary group: European Solidarity (2012–present)

Personal details
- Born: 19 August 1976 (age 49) Sevastopol, Crimean Oblast, Ukrainian SSR, Soviet Union
- Party: European Solidarity
- Education: National University of Kyiv-Mohyla Academy
- Awards: Member of the Order of Liberty

Rostyslav Mykolaiovych Pavlenko (Ukrainian: Ростислав Миколайович Павленко; born 19 August 1976) is a Ukrainian politician, scientist, and public figure who serves as a People's Deputy of Ukraine since 2012.

== Previous employments ==
In 2004 and from 2013 to 2014, he participated in the headquarters of the Ukrainian peaceful revolutions, the Euromaidans. He was responsible for situation analysis, prognosis, and policy suggestions in the headquarters of Victor Yushchenko (in 2004) and Vitaly Klitschko (2013–2014) during the Maidans.

Since 2019, Rostyslav Pavlenko has served as a Member of Parliament of Ukraine, continuing his extensive career in public service and strategic analysis. Prior to his current role, he was the Director of the National Institute for Strategic Studies (August 2018–May 2019), where he contributed to shaping Ukraine's long-term policies on national security and governance.

From December 2014 to July 2018, Pavlenko held the position of Deputy Head of the Administration of the President of Ukraine, where he was instrumental in policy coordination and situational analysis at the highest level of government. Earlier, he served as a Member of Parliament (December 2012–January 2015), demonstrating his ability to navigate complex legislative processes.

Pavlenko's academic pursuits were complemented by practical experience as a post-doctoral researcher at the National University of Kyiv-Mohyla Academy (NaUKMA) between 2010 and 2012, during which he also served as deputy editor-in-chief of Tyzhden (The Week), a prominent Ukrainian magazine.

His prior governmental roles included leading analytical services within the Secretariat of the President of Ukraine, such as Head of the Analysis and Rapid Response Service (July 2009–February 2010) and Head of the Situation Analysis Service (January 2006–December 2008). These positions underscored his expertise in managing critical information and delivering actionable insights.

In the Academia, Pavlenko has maintained a long-standing association with NaUKMA, serving as an assistant professor since 1999, an associate professor since 2002, and head of the Political Science Department beginning in February 2005. He continued as a part-time associate professor until May 2007, contributing to the education of future Ukrainian policymakers.

His professional trajectory also includes directorial and editorial roles, such as Director of the Foundation for Social Strategies (2009), Editor of the Political Science Section of Person and Politics magazine (since 1999), and Director of the International Comparative Analysis Institute (1998–2002).

Early in his career, Pavlenko worked as a consultant to a Member of Parliament (1996–2002) and as a commentator for Radio Free Europe/Radio Liberty (1998), demonstrating his capacity to bridge the Academia, journalism, and politics. He also served as an expert on political issues for the Association of Young Ukrainian Political Scientists and Politicians (1996–1998), where he began establishing his reputation as a prominent Ukrainian political scientist.

== Awards and titles ==
From 2015 to 2019, Pavlenko was the coordinator of state efforts to assist the Ukrainian Orthodox in unification, recognition and obtaining Tomos (certificate) of Autocephaly (church independence). Upon successful obtaining of the Tomos of Autocephaly, Pavlenko was decorated by President Poroshenko with the Order of Liberty on 22 January 2019. He successfully led negotiations with the Ecumenical Patriarch of Constantinople Bartholomew I, Primates and clergy of the Autocephalous Orthodox Churches, and Ukrainian church notables.

Pavlenko is a civil servant of the 1st rank (since February 2010), 2nd rank (since May 2007), and 3rd rank (since May 2005).

== Works ==
Pavlenko is an author of more than 400 publicist and over 40 scientific publications, in particular, he is the author of the monograph "Parliamentary responsibility of the government" (2002), co-author and/or editor of about a dozen books.

Since 1996 has the experience in analyzing and drafting legislation in the spheres of constitutional law, budget law, administrative reform, election law, education reform.

== Personal life ==
Pavlenko is married to Olena Mykhailivna Pavlenko. They have a son, Roman Rostyslavovych Pavlenko.
