= Ivan Gel =

Ukrainian politician and dissident

- Іван Гель

Deputy Chairman of the Lviv Oblast Council
- In office 1990–1994

Personal details
- Born: July 17, 1937 Klitsko, Lviv Oblast, Ukrainian SSR, Soviet Union
- Died: 16 March 2011 (aged 73) Lviv, Ukraine
- Known for: human rights activism with participation in the Ukrainian Helsinki Group
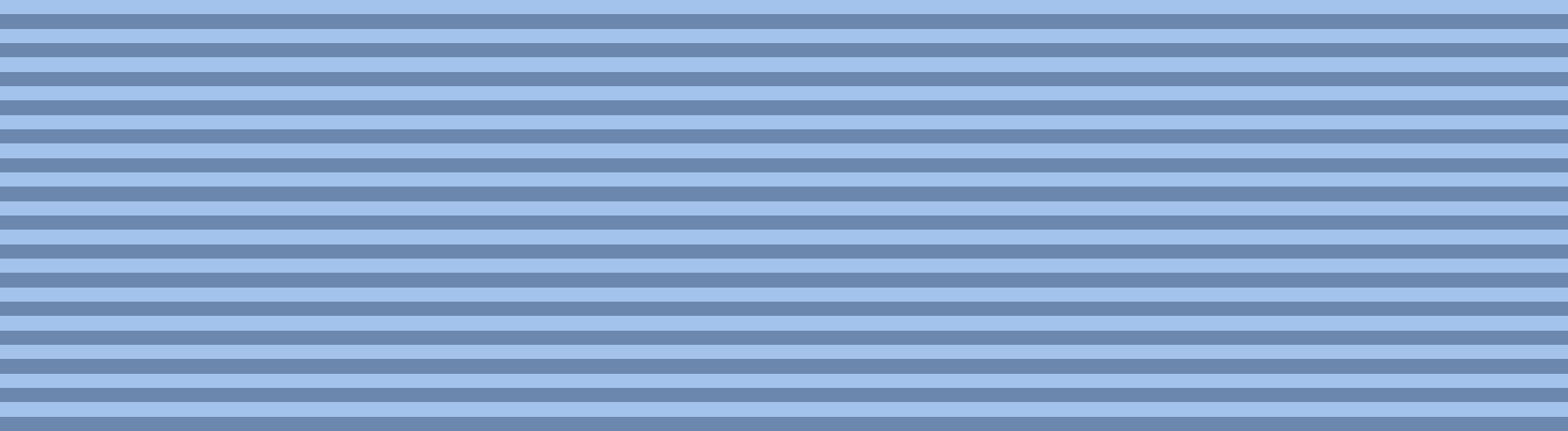
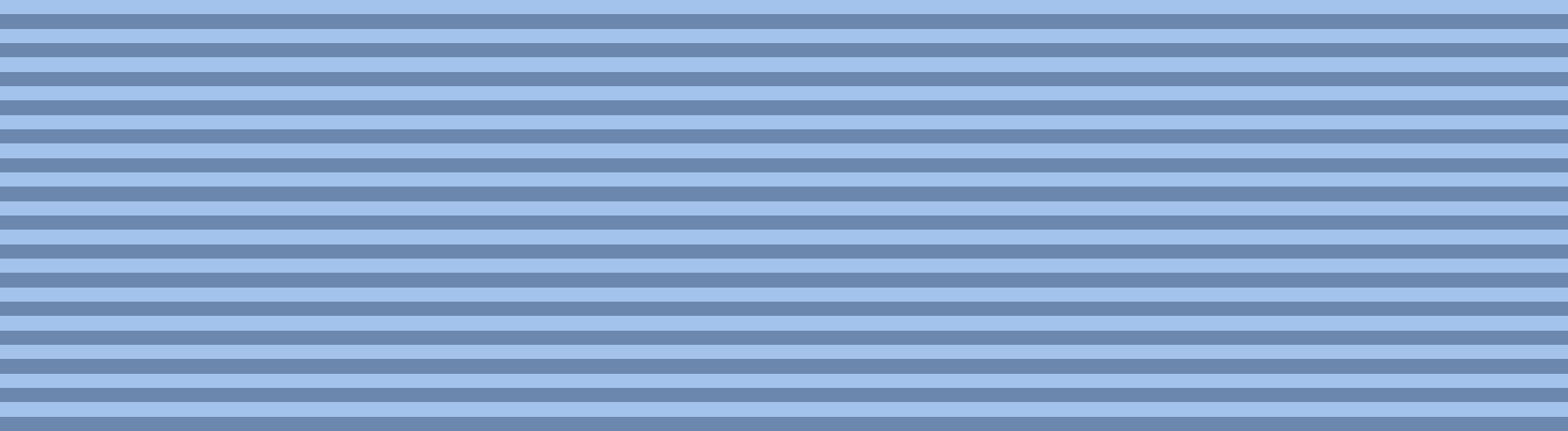
- Awards: Member of the Order of Liberty

Ivan Andriiovych Gel (Ukrainian: Іван Андрійович Гель, July 17, 1937 – March 16, 2011) was a Ukrainian politician and dissident. He was a member of the Ukrainian Helsinki Group and the Ukrainian Christian Democratic Party.

== Biography ==
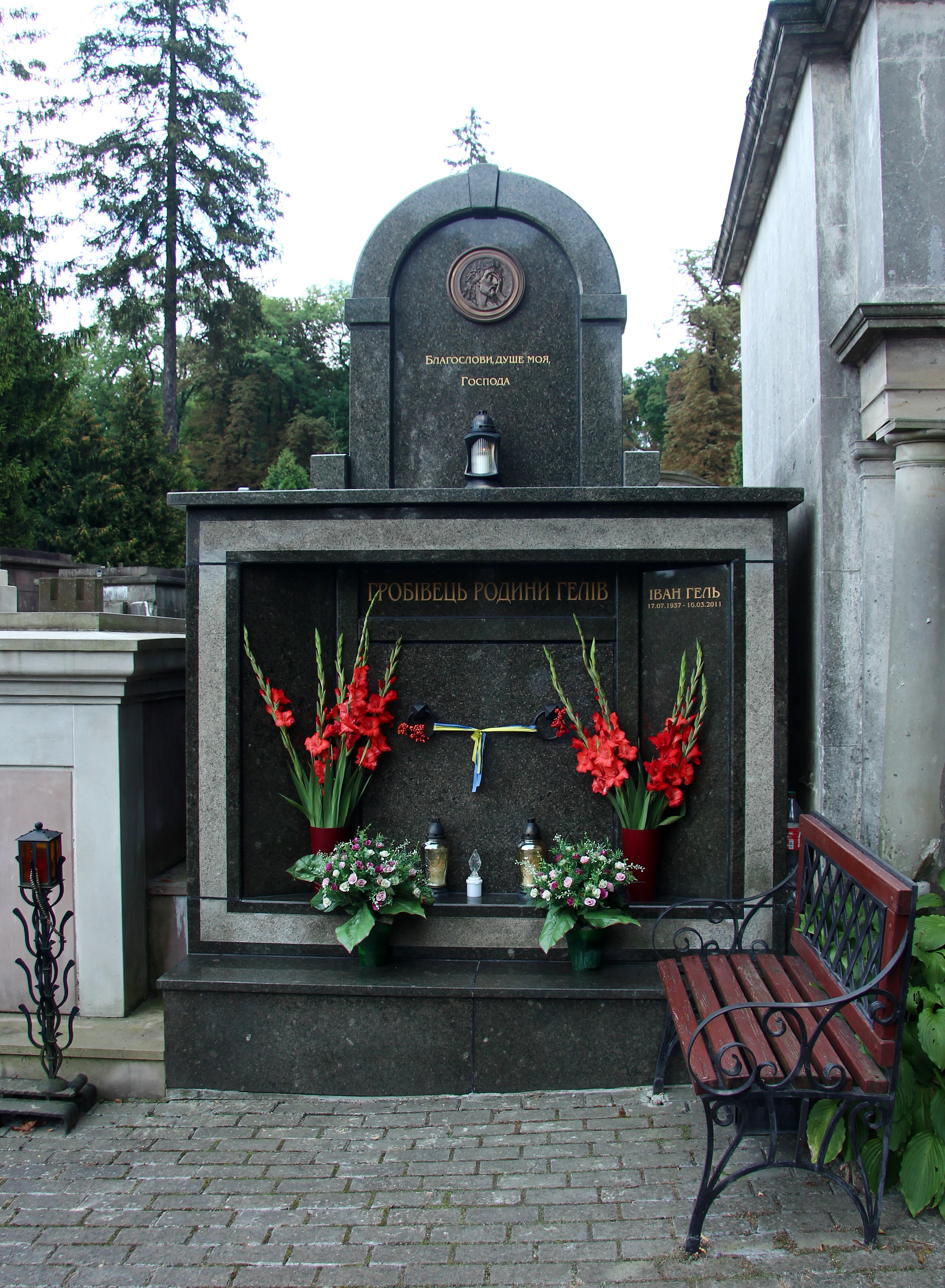
Ivan Gel's family grave on field 67 of the Lychakiv Cemetery in Lviv

Gel was born on 17 July 1937 in the village of Klitsko, which was then located within Lviv Oblast within the Ukrainian SSR. He was born into a peasant Greek-Catholic family. He was the son of Andriy Hel (born 1901), who volunteered for the Ukrainian Galician Army and served during the Polish–Ukrainian War. He later was the head of Prosvita, a society aimed at preserving Ukrainian culture, within the village of Klitsko and then participated in the Organisation of Ukrainian Nationalists (OUN) before being arrested and sent to the gulags in 1950. Through his mother's side, he was part of the family of Tershakovets, which was well known for producing leaders of the OUN.

He initially attended school in Komarno, but upon his father's arrest in 1950 his grades dropped dramatically as he was forced to work, and in 1952 he announced his refusal to join the local Komsomol for which he was expelled. As a result, he illegally obtained a passport and fled the area, going to work as a loader at a bread factory and completed night school in Sambir. After graduating, he attempted to enter the Faculty of History at University of Lviv. However, he was denied, as he told the entrance examiners that his father worked in a kolkhoz, even though his father was imprisoned in Tayshet, for which he was accused of lying. He then worked as a mechanic at the Lviv Forklift Plant.

From 1956 to 1959 he served in the army. After demobilization, he entered the department of the History Faculty of Lviv State University.

On August 24, 1965, he was arrested and sentenced to 3 years in a strict regime camp for "anti-Soviet propaganda".

On January 12, 1972, he was arrested for the second time and sentenced to 10 years in a special regime camp and 5 years in exile, recognized as a particularly dangerous recidivist. He served his sentence in Mordovia (Sosnovka) and in the Perm region (Kuchino).

He participated in hunger strikes in the camps, including a hunger strike demanding political prisoner status. Total duration of hunger strikes was over 300 days.

Ivan Gel returned to Ukraine on January 17, 1987, and created and headed the Committee for the Protection of the Ukrainian Greek Catholic Church.

He was a deputy and deputy chairman of the Lviv Oblast Council of the first democratic convocation (1990–1994). He headed the Lviv Regional Commission for the Restoration of the Rights of Rehabilitated Persons.

He died on March 16, 2011, in Lviv and was buried in the family grave at Lychakiv Cemetery.

== Awards ==
- Member of the Order of Liberty (September 18, 2009).
- Order of Prince Yaroslav the Wise 4th class (August 18, 2006).
- Order of Prince Yaroslav the Wise 5th class (January 21, 2002).
