= Ukrainian Republican Party =

Ukrainian Republican Party Українська республіканська партія
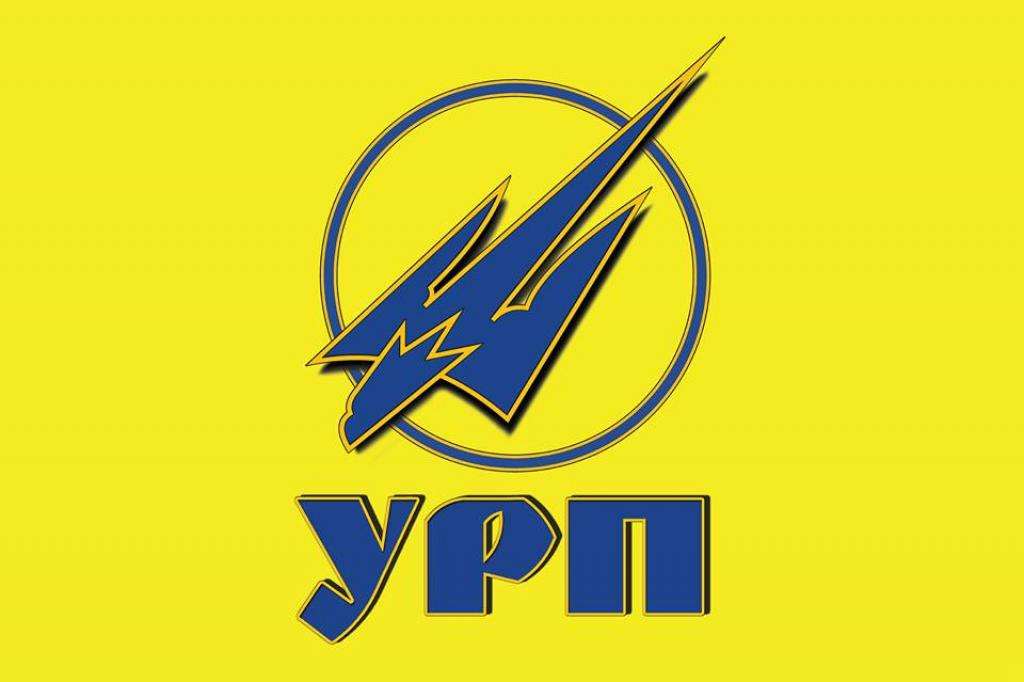
- Leader: Levko Lukianenko
- Founded: 5 November 1990 December 2006 (URP-Lukyanenko)
- Dissolved: 21 April 2002
- Preceded by: Ukrainian Helsinki Union
- Merged into: Ukrainian Republican Party "Sobor"
- Headquarters: Kyiv
- Ideology: Ukrainian nationalism National conservatism
- Political position: Right-wing (Note: Other sources described them as either centre-right or far-right.)

Website
- http://urp1990.com.ua/

The Ukrainian Republican Party (Ukrainian: Українська республіканська партія, romanized: Ukrainska respublikanska partiia) is a political party in Ukraine. Registered on 5 November 1990 by the Ministry of Justice of the Ukrainian SSR, it was the first formal political party besides the Communist Party of the Soviet Union to be officially registered, though it had been founded in April 1990 on the basis of the Ukrainian Helsinki Union. In April 2002, the party merged with the Ukrainian People's Party "Sobor" as the Ukrainian Republican Party "Sobor". It then reformed in 2006.

== History ==
In November 1976, Ukrainian community groups were established to promote the implementation of the Helsinki agreements. Almost all members of the Ukrainian Helsinki Group were subsequently repressed; four of them (Vasyl Stus, Yuriy Lytvyn, Oleksa Tykhy, and Valeriy Marchenko) died in Soviet camps (Gulag).

In March 1988, the Ukrainian Helsinki Union (UHU) was formed. Since 1989, the UHU has engaged in open propaganda promoting Ukrainian independence.

Between 29–30 April 1990, the Ukrainian Republican Party (URP) was established out of the UHU. The party was registered on 5 November 1990 by the Ministry of Justice of the Ukrainian SSR as the first political party in Ukraine.

A 1992 split in the party resulted in the creation of the rival Ukrainian Conservative Republican Party (UKRP), led by Stepan Khmara.

In the 1994 Ukrainian parliamentary election, the URP core party obtained nine seats, initially adding three more by the end of the year.

During the 1998 Ukrainian parliamentary election, the party was part (together with Congress of Ukrainian Nationalists and Ukrainian Conservative Republican Party) of the Election Bloc "National Front" (Ukrainian: Виборчий блок партій «Національний фронт»), which won 2.71% of the national vote and six (constituency) seats. In January 2001, the "National Front" parliamentary faction had grown to 17 deputies.

After being part of the National Salvation Committee, the party became part of the Yulia Tymoshenko Electoral Bloc alliance during the Ukrainian 2002 parliamentary elections. On 21 April 2002, the party merged with the Ukrainian People's Party "Sobor" as the Ukrainian Republican Party "Sobor".

In May 2006, Levko Lukianenko tried to reestablish URP after URP Sobor switched to Our Ukraine–People's Self-Defense Bloc from the Yulia Tymoshenko Bloc; the new party became known as the URP of Lukyanenko and was registered in 2006. In November 2010, Lukyanenko was elected leader of the Ukrainian Republican Party.

=== Reformation ===
The Ukrainian Republican Party reregistered in December 2006 as Ukrainian Republican Party Lukyanenko (Ukrainian: Українська республіканська партія Лук'яненка). The party was led by political veteran Levko Lukyanenko (1928–2018). The party did not participate in the 2007 parliamentary election or the 2012 Ukrainian parliamentary election (nationwide proportional party-list system); instead, three party members tried to win a seat in three of the 225 local single-member districts. None of the party's candidates won.

The party participated in the 2014 Ukrainian parliamentary election in five single-member districts, but again did not win seats. The party has not taken part in national elections since 2012.

The party occupies a few seats in local and oblast councils. In the 2020 Ukrainian local elections, the party gained four deputies (0.01% of all available mandates).

== Election results ==
Local elections (year links to election page)
Year	Votes	%	Mandates	Notes
2010	?	?	1	2013 by-election in Nadvirna electoral district (No.25)
2020	?	0.01%	4	

Parliamentary since 2002 (year links to election page)
Year	Votes	%	Mandates	Notes
1994	728,614	2.68	8	
1998	721,966	2.8	2	part of National Front bloc
2002	1,882,087	7.54	?	part of Yulia Tymoshenko Bloc
2012	?	?	0	Constituency participation only
2014	?	?	0	Constituency participation only
