= Ukrainian Conservative Republican Party =

Political party in Ukraine

The Ukrainian Conservative Republican Party (Ukrainian: Українська консервативна республіканська партія, romanized: Ukrainska konservatyvna respublikanska partiia) was a political party in Ukraine in 1992 to 2001. It was created after a split in the Ukrainian Republican Party in 1992 led by Stepan Khmara. Later the party merged with the All-Ukrainian Union Fatherland, while the original Ukrainian Republican Party remained as an associate ally to Fatherland after merging with the Ukrainian People's Party Assembly.

The Ukrainian Conservative Republican Party performed poorly in the 1994 parliamentary elections winning only two parliamentary seats originally, one of which was later overtaken by the former President of Ukraine Leonid Kravchuk. In the 1998 parliamentary elections the party along with the Ukrainian Republican Party and the Congress of Ukrainian Nationalists participated in the "National Front" electoral bloc, the combination won 2,71% of the national votes and 6 constituencies. In January 2001 the "National Front" parliamentary faction had grown to 17 deputies.

In December 2001 the party fully merged with the All-Ukrainian Union "Fatherland".

The party was officially deregistered by the Ukrainian Ministry of Justice in July 2003.
