= Stepan Khmara =

Ukrainian doctor and politician (1937–2024)

- Степан Хмара
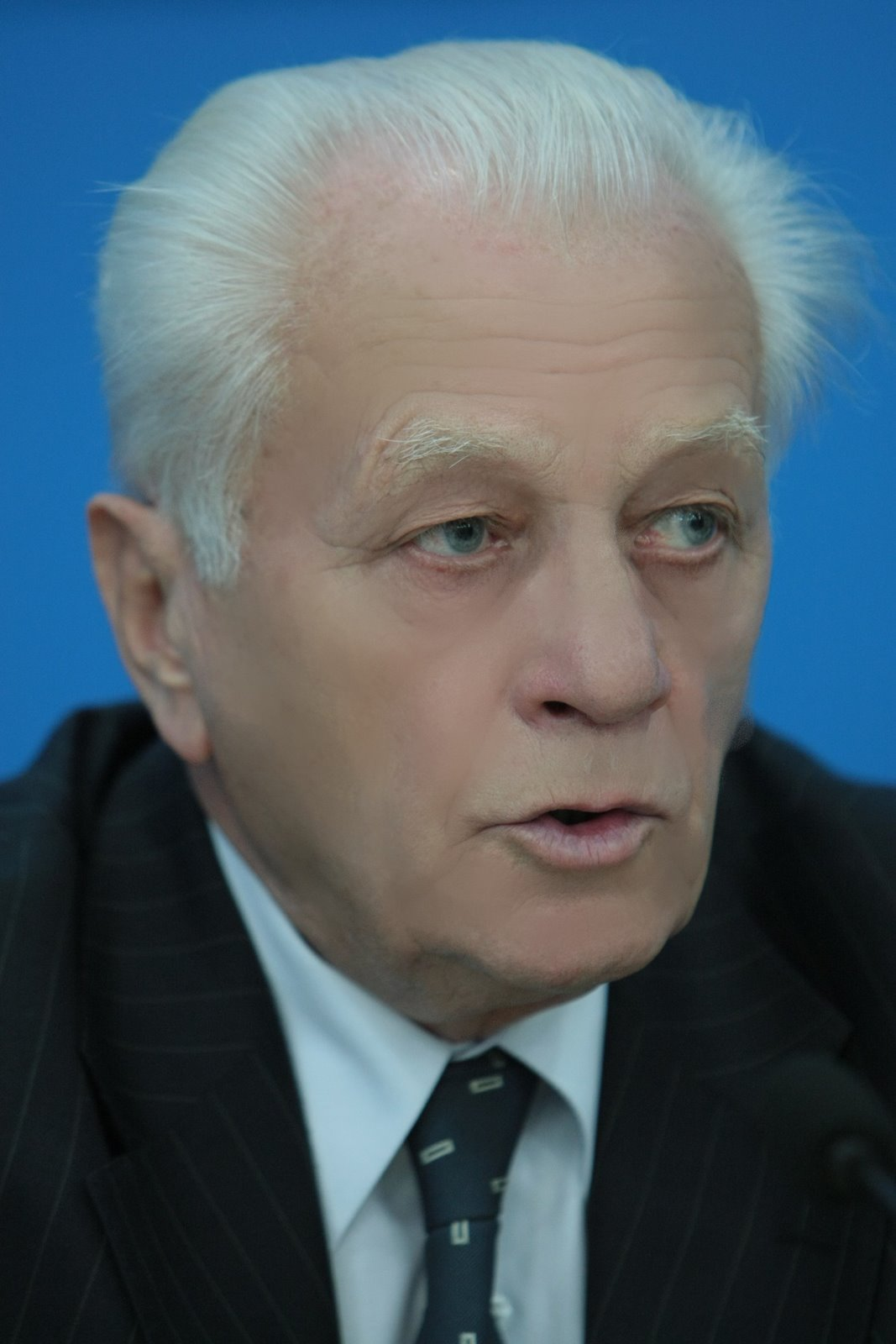
- Khmara in 2008

People's Deputy of Ukraine
- In office 14 May 2002 – 25 May 2006
- In office 15 May 1990 – 12 May 1998

Personal details
- Born: Stepan Ilkovych Khmara; 12 October 1937 Bobiatyn, Lwów Voivodeship, Poland
- Died: 21 February 2024 (aged 86) Kyiv, Ukraine
- Party: NRU; UKRP; Batkivshchyna
- Education: Danylo Halytsky Lviv National Medical University
- Occupation: Doctor

Stepan Ilkovych Khmara (Ukrainian: Степа́н І́лькович Хма́ра; 12 October 1937 – 21 February 2024) was a Ukrainian doctor, Soviet dissident and politician.

As a student of the Lviv State Medical Institute Khmara was involved in the underground Samizdat-movement that published Soviet Union's banned literature.

In 1980 the KGB arrested Khmara and he was sentenced to 7 years of imprisonment in strict regime camps and 5 years of exile for "Ukrainian nationalist activities". In 1987 he returned to Ukraine and in 1988 became one of the leaders of the Ukrainian Helsinki Group. In April 1990 this organisation morphed into the Ukrainian Republican Party.

In October 1990 Khmara took part in the Revolution on Granite. Khmara also took part in the 13-day hunger strike that accompanied the protests.

As member of the People's Movement of Ukraine, the Ukrainian Conservative Republican Party, and Batkivshchyna, Khmara served in (Ukraine's national parliament) Verkhovna Rada from 1990 to 1998 and again from 2002 to 2006. In the 2006 Ukrainian parliamentary election he failed to return to parliament since he stood for the party Ukrainian National Bloc of Kostenko and Plyushch that did not win seats.

In 2004 Khmara was one of the faces of the Orange Revolution that supported Viktor Yushchenko.

Khmara died on 21 February 2024, at the age of 86. On 25 February 2024 Khmara's public funeral procesion was held on Kyiv's main square Maidan Nezalezhnosti. He was buried at the Baikove Cemetery.
