= Yosyp Vinsky =

Ukrainian politician (born 1956)

- Йосип Вінський
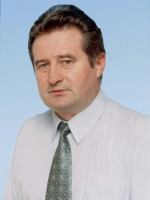
- Vinsky in 2007

5th Minister of Transport and Communication
- In office 18 December 2007 – 23 June 2009
- President: Viktor Yanukovych
- Prime Minister: Yulia Tymoshenko
- Preceded by: Mykola Rudkovsky
- Succeeded by: Kostyantyn Yefymenko

Personal details
- Born: 2 January 1956 (age 70) Loshkivtsi, Khmelnytskyi Oblast, Ukrainian SSR, Soviet Union
- Education: Kyiv Institute of Political Science and Social Management; Podolsk State University
- Profession: Politician

Yosyp Vikentiyovych Vinsky (Ukrainian: Йо́сип Віке́нтійович Ві́нський; born 2 January 1956) is a Ukrainian politician who became the fifth Minister of Transport and Communication from 2007 to 2009.

== Early life and education ==
Yosyp is born on 2 January 1956 in the village of Loshkivtsi, Ukraine SSR, and graduated from the Kamianets-Podilskyi Agricultural Institute, majoring in mechanical engineering in 1977. He went on to study at the Higher Party School at the Central Committee of the Communist Party of Ukraine, as a political scientist.

== Career ==
=== Early career ===
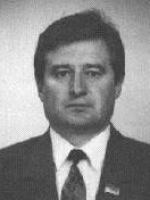
Yosyp Vinsky in 1994

Prior to Yosyp's ministerial role, he had held several early positions such as a diagnostic engineer of Kamianets-Podilskyi district association Agricultural machinery of Khmelnytskyi Oblast, and later as a chief engineer of the state farm named after Shchorsa VO Soyuzsortnasinnyaovoch of the Dubno Raion of the Rivne Oblast from 1977 to 1979; a designer and senior engineer of the Kamianets-Podilskyi branch of the Kyiv special PKB Ukrsortnasinniaovoch from 1979 to 1981; a member of the Communist Party of the Soviet Union (CPSU) in 1983; work with the Komsomol from 1981 to 1991; the head of the Belarus technical center of the Agropromtekhnika enterprise from 1991 to 1994.

In October 1991, he has been a member of the Socialist Party of Ukraine (SPU). He headed the Khmelnytskyi regional organization of the SPU; During the People's Deputy of Ukraine of the 2nd convocation from April 1994 to April 1998, as the Horodotsk electoral district No.411 of Khmelnytskyi Raion. As the Head of the sub-committee on economic reforms, pricing, taxes and structural policy of the Committee on Agricultural Industry, Land Resources and Rural Social Development. Member (authorized) of the SPU and Peasant Party of Ukraine (SelPU) fraction. Later during the People's Deputy of Ukraine of the 3rd convocation from the SPU-SelPU from March 1998 to April 2002, he was listed No.9. At the time of the elections, he was the People's Deputy of Ukraine, member of the SPU.

In February 2001, Yosyp was the representative of the Civic Committee for the Protection of the Constitution Ukraine without Kuchma to conduct negotiations with representatives of the Kuchma government. Later in March 2002, he was the representative of the SPU in the Central Committee. During the People's Deputy of Ukraine of the 4th convocation from April 2002 to April 2006, he was listed No.6. In May 2002, he has been the first secretary of Politrada of the SPU. During the People's Deputy of Ukraine of the 5th convocation from April 2006 to November 2007, he was again listed as No.6.

Later in July 2006, he left his position of the first secretary of the SPU in protest against the nomination by the head of the SPU Oleksandr Moroz of his candidacy for the position of the chairman of the Verkhovna Rada, which resulted in a significant convergence of the SPU, the Communist Party of Ukraine and the Party of Regions. In January 2007, Vinsky joined the Batkivshchyna party and became the deputy head of the Yulia Tymoshenko Bloc (BYuT) faction and the deputy chairman of the VO Batkivshchyna. During the 2007 elections, he received a deputy's mandate on the list of Yulia Tymoshenko's Bloc No.4. During the election campaign, he was the first deputy head of the election staff of BYuT. Notably, his position as No.4 could be interpreted as an odd sign of his intimacy with Yulia Tymoshenko, thus political rumors circulated during the socialist era that Yosyp was Tymoshenko's ally in Moroz's inner circle.

=== Ministerial career ===
Appointed by Verkhovna Rada of Ukraine Resolution No. 10-VI of 18 December 2007 to the position of Minister of Transport and Communications of Ukraine. Yosyp would later give a notice of his resignation on 17 June 2009. He stated that his choice was made due to severe disagreements with Prime Minister Yulia Tymoshenko over political, personnel, and economic matters, as well as the ethics of relationships between members of the Cabinet of ministers of Ukraine. Vinsky left Batkivshchyna on the same day. On 23 June 2009, the Verkhovna Rada of Ukraine decided to remove him from his position as Minister of Transport and Communications of Ukraine.

== Later life ==
On 17 September 2009, Yosyp became the coordinator of the people's-patriotic association Nabat, in the creation of which more than 20 democratic, social-democratic and people's-patriotic parties and public organizations took part. On 9 February 2010, he headed the People's Power political party. On 17 December 2011, he was elected deputy chairman of the United Left and Peasants party.

== Personal life ==
Yosyp is married and has two children; a son and a daughter. His hobbies are gardening and hunting.

== Honours ==
Throughout his career, he has been awarded the following honours;

- Order of Merit Third Class (April 2009)

Political offices
Preceded by Mykola Rudkovsky	5th Minister of Transport and Communication; 18 December 2007 – 23 June 2009	Succeeded by Kostyantyn Yefymenko
