= Rise up, Ukraine! (2002–2003) =

2002–2003 protests in Ukraine

Povstan, Ukraino!
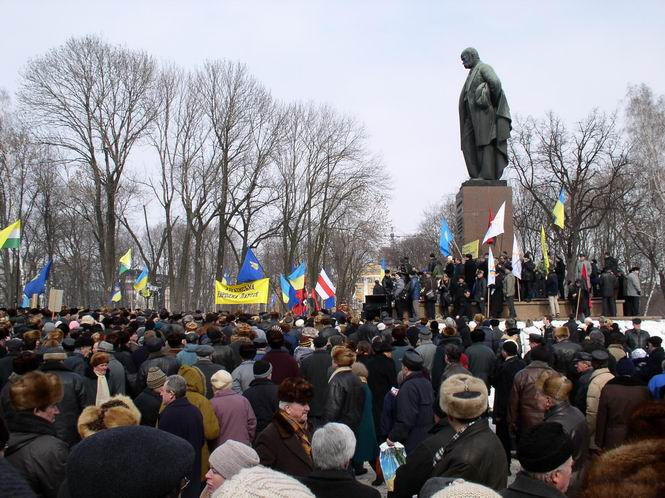
- Protests at the Taras Shevchenko monument, 9 March 2003
- Date: 16 September 2002 – 19 October 2002 (1 month and 3 days); 9 March 2003
- Location: Ukraine (primarily Kyiv)
- Caused by: Cassette Scandal; media censorship and authoritarianism; Replacement of Viktor Yushchenko as Prime Minister; Russophilia in the Ukrainian government; Conduct of the 2002 Ukrainian parliamentary election
- Goals: Removal and imprisonment of President Leonid Kuchma; Early presidential elections
- Result: Government victory: Kuchma remains in power; Consolidation of opposition parties; Ascension of Viktor Yanukovych and Viktor Medvedchuk

Parties
Yulia Tymoshenko Bloc: Batkivshchyna; Ukrainian Republican Party "Sobor"; Ukrainian Social Democratic Party; Socialist Party of Ukraine; Communist Party of Ukraine; Our Ukraine Bloc: Christian Democratic Union; Congress of Ukrainian Nationalists; People's Movement of Ukraine; Reforms and Order Party; Ukrainian People's Party; Others: Social-National Party of Ukraine; Ukrainian National Assembly – Ukrainian People's Self-Defence	Government of Ukraine: Office of the President; Militsiya

Lead figures
Oleksandr Moroz; Yulia Tymoshenko; Petro Symonenko; Viktor Yushchenko	Leonid Kuchma; Anatoliy Kinakh; Viktor Yanukovych; Viktor Medvedchuk; Svyatoslav Piskun; Volodymyr Lytvyn

Number
10,000–15,000 (police estimate); 50,000–150,000 (own estimate)	

Casualties and losses
64 arrested	

"Rise up, Ukraine!" (Ukrainian: Повстань, Україно!, romanized: Povstan, Ukraino!) was a series of protests in Ukraine that occurred from September to October 2002, and then again from December 2002 to March 2003. Similarly to the unrelated Ukraine without Kuchma protests, "Rise up, Ukraine!" was aimed at the removal of Leonid Kuchma as president after revelations about the murder of Georgiy Gongadze and the sale of the Kolchuga passive sensor to Iraq were revealed in the Cassette Scandal. Other matters of concern were the conduct of media during the 2002 Ukrainian parliamentary election, the removal of Viktor Yushchenko as Prime Minister of Ukraine, and Russophilia within the government, among other issues.

"Rise up, Ukraine!" was originally launched by the Yulia Tymoshenko Bloc, and supported by the Socialist Party of Ukraine and Communist Party of Ukraine. The Our Ukraine Bloc later joined shortly before the protests began. Attempts to erect tent encampments were stopped by the Militsiya, and a later attempt by protesters to seize the Presidential Office Building was also responded to with force.

Ultimately unsuccessful in overthrowing Kuchma, "Rise up, Ukraine!" nonetheless helped to facilitate the events that would lead to the 2004 and 2005 Orange Revolution by causing the political rise of Viktor Medvedchuk and Viktor Yanukovych, pushing Viktor Yushchenko into the opposition, and helping to unify the anti-Kuchma opposition behind a single presidential candidate in the 2004 Ukrainian presidential election.

== Background ==
The 2002 Ukrainian parliamentary election was held on 31 March 2002, and led to a victory for the For United Ukraine! coalition, which was in favour of incumbent President Leonid Kuchma. The election was marred by irregularities, according to both opposition parties and international observers. In particular was the pro-government bias of media, which prevented opposition candidates from reaching an audience.

Shortly after the elections, Yulia Tymoshenko attempted to initiate impeachment proceedings against Kuchma on 15 April 2002. She was soon joined by the Ukrainian People's Party, the People's Movement of Ukraine, Ukrainian Republican Party "Sobor", Batkivshchyna, the Reforms and Order Party, and the Congress of Ukrainian Nationalists, who accused Kuchma of pursuing an "anti-Ukrainian" policy. The reasons for this accusation were cited as cooperation with Russia in the writing of history textbooks, the transfer of Eastern Orthodox churches from the Kyiv Patriarchate to the Moscow Patriarchate, and Kuchma's commemoration of the 1654 Pereiaslav Agreement.

On 16 July 2002, the Lviv chapter of the Yulia Tymoshenko Bloc announced it would be staging protests in the autumn, under the title of "Ukraine after Kuchma". They were supported by URP "Sobor", Batkivshchyna, Ukrainian Social Democratic Party, and the Ukrainian National Assembly – Ukrainian People's Self-Defence. References were made to Ukraine without Kuchma, with Tymoshenko saying that there was a need to learn from the mistakes of those protests. Tymoshenko later made up one-third of a "troika", alongside Oleksandr Moroz, leader of the Socialist Party of Ukraine, and Petro Symonenko, leader of the Communist Party of Ukraine. At the urging of Tymoshenko, the Our Ukraine Bloc, a leading opposition coalition led by Viktor Yushchenko, also joined the protest camp.

On 2 September, the "troika" held a press conference, where they announced their intention to launch a campaign of civil unrest under the name of "Rise up, Ukraine!", beginning on 16 September with protests in Kyiv's European Square and continuing until "total victory". The decision to hold protests in European Square was done in defiance of a ban on gatherings in the square by the Shevchenkivskyi District Court, which recommended Kyiv Chaika Airfield instead.

== Protests ==
=== First protests (16–17 September) ===
The protests in Kyiv began on 16 September at 15:00, with the gathering of protesters from the troika and Our Ukraine Bloc on European Square. There, a rally took place including between 10,000 and 15,000 demonstrators (according to police) or 50,000 to 150,000 (according to the organisers). According to the Korrespondent magazine, there were around 20,000 protesters, with the largest contingent coming from the Communist Party at 12,000 people. At the rally, a moment of silence was devoted to Georgiy Gongadze, whose murder exactly two years prior had sparked the Cassette Scandal.

After speeches were given at the rally by politicians, the protesters "adopted" an appeal to suspend Kuchma from the presidency. They began to move towards the Presidential Office Building before tents began being erected at the intersection Bankova and Lyuteranska Streets. From 3:30 the next morning, the Militsiya began surrounding the encampment and, by 4:00, began tearing down tents near the Presidential Office Building. By 6:09, the SPU's encampment had been totally demolished, according to SPU People's Deputy Mykola Rudkovsky.

After the destruction of the tent encampment, the opposition responded strongly; Moroz accused Kuchma and Viktor Medvedchuk (chief of the Presidential Administration) of establishing a "junta", Tymoshenko claimed that the Militsiya had "bulletproof vests, assault rifles, gas canisters, helmets with them," and Symonenko said, "this is fascism, it was like this in 1941." Additional protests were scheduled for 24 September. The Militsiya noted that, per the decision of the Shevchenkivskyi Court, such gatherings in the city centre were illegal, and claimed that ample warning had been given to protesters prior to the crackdown. The Militsiya claimed the arrest of 64 individuals, saying that none of the arrests had involved physical violence. Petro Opanasenko, deputy secretary of the Ministry of Internal Affairs, said that he had no information regarding a bloodied man who was filmed at the scene of the protests. Opanasenko additionally alleged that two hunting knives and a grenade had been found on the ground at the intersection of Lyuteranska and Shovkovychna Streets.

=== Seizure of the Presidential Office Building (23–25 September) ===
Protests once again began on 23 September, as multiple People's Deputies from the troika's parties, led by Yuriy Lutsenko, occupied Kyiv Television Centre and demanded that state television give them a live broadcast to refute pro-government claims. In response to the demands, UT-1 ceased all broadcasting for the day, displaying only text saying "This news programme cannot be broadcast due to the capture of the broadcast studio by People's Deputies O. Moroz, Yu. Tymoshenko, P. Symonenko, and their supporters, in total numbering over 200 people." The troika's leaders were not allowed to use UT-1, and instead held only an impromptu press conference before leaving the building.

On 24 September, the planned rally took place outside the Verkhovna Rada building, with around 5,000 people attending. At first comprising only supporters of the troika, they were later joined by Yushchenko, who stated that he would no longer "participate in public lies" by voting on the issues presented in the Verkhovna Rada. Verkhovna Rada Chairman Volodymyr Lytvyn called on the situation to be resolved peacefully, claiming that the state of the Ukrainian economy was the cause for the protests. A column of protesters began moving down Instytutska Street towards the Presidential Office Building at 14:40, blocking traffic.

Four minutes later, the protesters overran police cordons and began massing outside the Presidential Office Building, where Kuchma was meeting with Chinese and African ambassadors. Militsiya members in gas masks and automatic weapons blocked off the fourth floor and refused to permit the People's Deputies through. By 16:05, negotiations began, and by 17:25, Kuchma agreed to further negotiations the next day. An hour later, however, special police began swarming the building, and Kuchma fled. A group of People's Deputies declared a hunger strike, refusing to leave the building despite the increasing police presence. Members of the Ministry of Internal Affairs and an investigator under the Prosecutor General of Ukraine arrived at the building, where Moroz read the appeal for Kuchma's resignation. Lytvyn arrived at the building around 22:02, and agreed to hold an emergency session of the Verkhovna Rada on allegations that Kuchma had sold Kolchuga systems to Iraq.

At 1:00 on the morning of 25 September, the investigator from the Prosecutor General's office stated that the People's Deputies performing the hunger strike would be forcefully removed for their illegal seizure of the Presidential Office Building, but no such event took place. At 11:15, Kuchma received a delegation consisting of the troika's members and Lesya Orobets. However, Kuchma refused to resign, and after the meeting, the deputies peacefully left the building.

=== 19 October ===
Protests again began on 19 October 2002, this time marking what was described by the organisers as the victims of Kuchma's government. A cast-iron sheet was placed on the corner of Bankova and Instytutska in lieu of a memorial. The day would prove to be the last of the major protests that year.

=== 9 March ===
On 4 December 2002, the leaders of the troika announced a protest scheduled for 9 March 2003 (the anniversary of Taras Shevchenko's birth). They were opposed in this by Yushchenko, who called for protests on 5 March instead. Tymoshenko stated that the date would give the opposition the opportunity to be more prepared and professional, and expressed plans in the interim period to protest in Ukraine's oblasts rather than Kyiv. The following months would be marked by squabbles among the troika, particularly the KPU, and the Our Ukraine Bloc, which sought to avoid the former's involvement.

On 2 March 2003, opposition politicians gathered the "All-Ukrainian Extraordinary Congress of Deputies", where they called for the unification of the opposition and stated that the primary goal of all future electoral campaigns would be to remove Kuchma from power. Three days later, Kuchma held a televised address where he laid out proposals for constitutional reform in order to reduce the presidency's power and called for nationwide debate on the proposal. On the day before the protest occurred, the Shevchenkivskyi District Court barred marches and tents in Old Kyiv.

The protest began at 11:50, as members of the KPU, SPU, and BYuT began gathering. Another group of Our Ukraine Bloc members also joined the protest, and by 12:08, they had met on Maidan Nezalezhnosti before moving to the Taras Shevchenko monument. There, calls were iterated by Tymoshenko and Yushchenko for a single candidate in the 2004 Ukrainian presidential election. A smaller group of nationalist protesters, led by Oleksandr Turchynov and also including Levko Lukianenko, travelled to Lukyanivska Prison to protest the convictions of UNA–UNSO members during Ukraine without Kuchma.

Polish newspaper Gazeta Wyborcza observed that the events marked a change in the attitudes of the opposition, from the more militant attitude the previous year to instead looking towards the 2004 presidential election. The newspaper Rzeczpospolita interviewed participants in the protest, who variously saw Yushchenko, Tymoshenko, or Symonenko as the ideal candidate.

== Legacy ==
Though the protests failed to remove Kuchma from the presidency, they marked a significant change in Russia–Ukraine relations. As Ukraine's ties with western nations declined in the face of the protests, Russia began exerting further influence on Ukraine. "Rise up, Ukraine!" was also followed by increasing crackdowns on media censorship, led by an increasingly-powerful Viktor Medvedchuk. Medvedchuk's ascendancy was paralleled by that of another pro-Russian politician, Viktor Yanukovych, who replaced Anatoliy Kinakh as prime minister on 16 November 2002. Conversely to the rise of Medvedchuk and Yanukovych within the opposition, "Rise up, Ukraine!" also led to Yushchenko's shift away from Kuchma and into the opposition, eventually culminating in his 2004 election as President of Ukraine.
