= Vitaly Shibko =

Ukrainian politician (1948–2021)

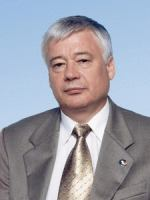

Member of the Verkhovna Rada
- In office 14 May 2002 – 23 November 2007
- In office 12 May 1994 – 12 May 1998

Personal details
- Born: 29 November 1948 Synelnykove, Ukrainian SSR
- Died: 24 December 2021 (aged 73) Dnipro, Ukraine
- Party: SPU

Vitaly Shibko (Ukrainian: Віталій Якович Шибко, romanized: Vitalii Yakovych Shybko; 29 November 1948 – 24 December 2021) was a Ukrainian politician. A member of the Socialist Party of Ukraine, he served in the Verkhovna Rada from 1994 to 1998 and again from 2002 to 2007.

== Early life ==
Shibko was born on 29 November 1948 in the village of Synelnykove, which was then part of the Ukrainian SSR in the Soviet Union. His father, Yakiv, and his mother, Hanna, were both workers. In 1975, he graduated from Oles Honchar Dnipro National University with a specialty as a teacher of history and social sciences and after having earlier been a student at the Mechanical Technical School, and later in 1981 became a Candidate of Historical Sciences. During this work, he was active in Komsomol work for Dnipropetrovsk, becoming secretary of a committee, head of a department, an instructor, and finally First Secretary of the Industrial District Committee. After completing his candidacy in 1981, he worked as an associate professor then professor at the National Metallurgical Academy of Ukraine.

== Political career ==
In 1991, he became a member of the Socialist Party of Ukraine, and was then elected in the 1994 Ukrainian parliamentary election for Samarskyi electoral district No. 82, and he served int eh Rada until 2007. In 1995, he was appointed a non-staff advisor to the President of Ukraine on science and education, while simultaneously working as Acting Chargé d’Affaires of Ukraine in Lebanon until 1997. He was then assistant-consultant to Oleksandr Moroz and Head of the Propaganda Department for Ukraine without Kuchma.
