= Samsonenko =

Samsonenko (Ukrainian: Самсоненко) is a surname. Notable people with the surname include:

- Oleh Samsonenko (born 1965), Ukrainian footballer
- Sergey Samsonenko (born 1967), Russian businessman
- Valentyna Semenyuk-Samsonenko (1957–2014), Ukrainian politician
