= Stanislav Nikolaenko =

Ukrainian politician

- Станіслав Ніколаєнко
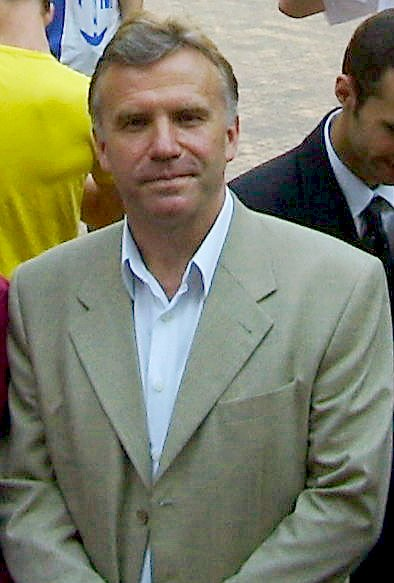
- Nikolaenko in 2005

Minister of Education and Science of Ukraine
- In office 4 February 2005 – 18 December 2007
- Preceded by: Vasyl Kremen
- Succeeded by: Ivan Vakarchuk

Personal details
- Born: 9 February 1956 (age 70) Bohdanivka, Ukrainian SSR, Soviet Union
- Party: United Left and Peasants.
- Website: https://nubip.edu.ua/node/10405

Stanislav Nikolaevich Nikolaenko (Ukrainian: Станіслав Миколайович Ніколаєнко, romanized: Stanislav Mykolaiovych Nikolaienko) is a Ukrainian politician. Acting Rector of the National University of Life and Environmental Sciences of Ukraine. Leader of United Left and Peasants.

Stanislav Nikolaenko was born in 1956 in Kirovohrad region. Professor, PhD in teacher training science, in 2008 to obtain a degree of Doctor of Science. Head of Public Council of Educators and Researches of Ukraine. Participant of protests against Kuchma, Orange Revolution, and Euromaidan.

== Early life ==
Professor Nikolaenko graduated from the Agricultural Academy of the Ukrainian SSR becoming a mechanical engineer (1978) and engineer-educator (1980). In 1991 he received a degree from the Odesa Institute of Political Science and Sociology.

Stanislav Nikolaenko began his career as a teacher at the Kirovohrad Agricultural College. After receiving teacher education he was teaching mechanization of livestock at the Kakhovka College. Later he served as the principal of the Krasnoperekopsky vocational school. In 1991–1994 years he worked as the Deputy Head of Kherson Regional Department of Education and associate professor of Agricultural Mechanization at the Kherson Agricultural Institute.

== Political career ==
- 1991-2009 - founder and active member of Socialist Party of Ukraine;
- 1991-2006 - MP, four times was elected to Verkhovna Rada (Parliament);
- 2005-2007 - Minister of Education and Science of Ukraine;
- 2008 - founder of the Union for Renewal of Socialist Party of Ukraine;
- 2009 - leader of Justice party (SPRAVEDLIVOST);
- 2009 - leader of United Left and Peasants.

In 2007 SPU lost the parliamentarian elections. In 2008 a group of SPU members including Nikolaenko and Aleksander Baranivskiy founded the "Union for Renewal of Socialist Party of Ukraine" and proposed 10 steps to return into "big policy" stated in the program "A Just Ukraine" to SPU leader Oleksander Moroz. But the conservative entourage of O. Moroz persuade him to refuse the "road map" for self-protection. A few months later Nikolaenko was expelled from SPU.

In April 2009 Nikolaenko was elected as a leader of the Justice party.

In December 2011 Nikolaenko was elected as a leader of United Left and Peasants. Nikolaenko participated in 2012 parliamentarian elections and got the third place in electoral district 185 with 16.18% (14 808 popular votes) and thus no seat in the Verkhovna Rada.

== Career outside politics ==
In 2008 Prof. Nikolaenko obtained a Doctorate Degree in Teacher Education. Since 2009 he has been working as Professor at Higher Education and Law Department of the University of Education Management under the National Academy of Pedagogical Sciences of Ukraine.

In June 2014 Nikolaenko was appointed Acting Rector of the National University of Life and Environmental Sciences of Ukraine. Former rector Dmytro Melnychyk disagreed with the appointment of Nikolaenko and sought support at Ministry of Agrarian Policy and Food (Ukraine).
