= Mykola Rudkovsky =

Ukrainian politician

- Микола Рудьковський
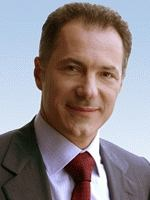
- Rudkovsky in 2012

4th Minister of Transport and Communication
- In office 4 August 2006 – 18 December 2007
- President: Viktor Yushchenko
- Prime Minister: Viktor Yanukovych
- Preceded by: Viktor Bondar
- Succeeded by: Yosyp Vinsky

Personal details
- Born: 18 December 1967 (age 58) Staryi Bykiv, Chernihiv Oblast, Ukrainian SSR, Soviet Union
- Education: Chernihiv Collegium National University
- Profession: Politician

Military service
- Allegiance: Soviet Union
- Branch/service: Soviet Army
- Years of service: 1986–1988

Mykola Mykolayovych Rudkovsky (Ukrainian: Мико́ла Микола́йович Рудько́вський; born 18 December 1967) is a Ukrainian politician and businessman who was the fourth Minister of Transport and Communication from 2006 to 2007. He was also the former chairman of the Socialist Party of Ukraine, which has since been banned.

== Early life and education ==
Rudkovsky was born on 18 December 1967 to a family of teachers in the village of Staryi Bykiv, Chernihiv Oblast Ukraine SSR.

His early life and education are unable to be confirmed, as many details, some provided by Rudkovsky himself, have been put into doubt owing to inconsistencies.

Official Ukraine Today, a directory of government services and biographical information of officials, states that Rudkovsky was educated at the Chernihiv Collegium National University from 1985 to 1990, with the exception of a brief interregnum where he was conscripted to the Soviet Army from 1986 to 1988. He then studied at the Moscow State Business School in 1990, and then at the Vienna University of Economics from 1991 to 1994. While in Austria, Rudkovsky claimed to have founded his own company, owned a home in a respectable area, as well as a modern car, but decided to sell everything and move back to Ukraine. The directory also lists Rudkovsky as possessing a masters in international economics from the Kyiv National Economic University.

== Business career ==
Rudkovsky was a director at the State Agency for Investment of Ukraine from 1996 to 1998, before moving on to serve as deputy chairman of the board at Ukrgasprom, which was later renamed Naftogaz, whereupon he became the deputy general director of its trading house.

In 1999, Rudkovsky and future president of Ukraine Petro Poroshenko founded Neftegazvydobuvannya, a gas production company. Ukrainian oligarch Rinat Akhmetov's DTEK currently owns 75% of the company. The remaining 25% owned by Rudkovsky and possible associates through a Dutch company were seized by the Ukrainian government in 2021 in relation to an investigation into the kidnapping of the company's former CEO, Oleh Seminskyi.

In 2020, Rudkovsky was ranked 87 out of 100 of Ukraine's richest people by Forbes. In 2014, he was reportedly worth $195 million, but was only valued at $100 million by 2021.

== Political career ==
From 1994 to 1996, Rudkovsky worked for the Administration of the President of Ukraine as a consultant.

In 1998, he joined the Socialist Party of Ukraine (SPU), becoming one of its financiers.

In 2000, he became a consultant to the SPU people's deputy Valentyna Semenyuk-Samsonenko.

In 2001, he became the head of the SPU's Chernihiv Regional Committee. That year, Rudkovsky and his brother's apartments were raided by state security services, who accused him of forging audio tapes that appeared to prove then-president Leonid Kuchma ordered the killing of journalist Georgiy Gongadze.

He was elected to the Verkhovna Rada from the SPU's electoral list in the 2002 and 2006 Ukrainian parliamentary election. He was simultaneously elected Mayor of Chernihiv in 2006, but resigned to take up his mandate as a people's deputy. Rudkovsky was supportive of the SPU working with the Party of Regions during the 2006 Ukrainian political crisis. His deputy mandate was terminated when he was appointed the Minister of Transport and Communication in the second Yanukovych Government.

He stood for the leadership of the SPU during the party's congresses in 2010 and 2011, clashing with party leader Oleksandr Moroz. He left the party in 2011, following the failure of a planned merger with other socialist parties, accusing Moroz of sabotage and maintaining a cult of personality.

In the 2012 Ukrainian parliamentary election, Rudkovsky was elected as self-nominated candidate and subsequently sat in the Party of Region's parliamentary faction. He rejoined the SPU the same year. He was elected the party's chairman in 2013.

During the Euromaidan, Rudkovsky voted in favour of the anti-protest laws in Ukraine, but later introduced draft legislation to repeal them.

A leadership struggle within the SPU emerged following the Revolution of Dignity. Rudkovsky resigned as leader and fled the country in 2014, after police began to focus on him as part of an investigation into the kidnapping of the former CEO of Naftogazvydobuvanny, Oleh Seminskyi, who was kidnapped in 2012 and held hostage until 2015.

== Legal issues and controversies ==
=== Fraud and forgery ===
In 1998, the Chernihiv Regional Court ruled that Rudkovsky was not a citizen of Ukraine. Records showed that he had registered his places of residence in villages located in his native Bobrovytsia Raion from 1991 to 1995 and obtained a passport based on these records despite the fact he was supposed to have been residing in Austria at the time.

In 2007, Rudkovsky's experience and educational certifications were questioned by the media. In his application to work at Ukrgasprom from 1997, he claimed to have studied at the Plekhanov Russian University of Economics from 1988 to 1993, and at the Chernihiv Collegium National University from 1993 to 1996. While working as a consultant to a people's deputy, he submitted documents claiming to have graduated from the Chernihiv Collegium National University in 1990, and a corresponding diploma issued in 1996.

In 2018, Rudkovsky was detained in the United Arab Emirates under suspicion of document forgery, but released a month later. Media reports stated he was detained for having a fake Iraqi passport, and was found to be in possession of passports from a number of different countries. The Ukrainian prosecutor-general's office denied these claims after his release.

=== Hit and run ===
Rudkovsky has been the subject of a criminal complaint filed by the prosecutor's office in Kyiv over an alleged hit-and-run on 14 August 1996 involving a cyclist, who died at the site of the accident. The case was abruptly closed. The Kyiv prosecutor's office later noted that only a superficial inspection was conducted, that the inquiry inspector came to a conclusion based on Rudkovsky's own testimony, and that the inspector failed to discover crucial facts at various stages of the investigation.

=== Turkmen opposition visit ===
In 2007, an investigation was opened against Rudkovsky at the order of then-prime minister of Ukraine, Viktor Yanukovych. Rudkovsky was alleged to have arranged for a charter flight to bring a number of opposition figures from Turkmenistan into Ukraine, and had ordered the Ukrainian diplomatic missions in Austria, Bulgaria, and Norway to issue visas for their travel. The Turkmen opposition figures had arrived for a meeting in Ukraine on 26 December 2006, shortly after the death of Turkmen dictator Saparmurat Niyazov. This was recognised as an unfriendly act by the Turkmen government.

=== Embezzlement and abuse ===
Rudkovsky was charged in 2007 with misusing his position of authority and embezzling a sizable sum of money. On 14 December 2007, the Security Service of Ukraine summoned Mykola Rudkovsky for questioning surrounding the alleged illegal use of Ministry of Transport public funds totaling 390,000 hryvnia during an official trip to Paris on a private charter plane the previous June. The flight, according to investigators, was paid for by the Ministry of Transport. Rudkovsky was specifically accused of using public money to travel abroad.

A criminal case was initiated under Article 191 Part 5 of the Criminal Code of Ukraine (“misappropriation of funds on an especially large scale”), then reclassified to Article 364 Part 2 ("abuse of power and abuse of official position"). Mykola Rudkovsky was given a written order not to leave the country; he faced a sentence of up to 12 years in prison. During the investigation, it was revealed that the then-acting Minister of Transport had traveled to Paris in the company of one of the former “Miss Ukraine-Universe” winners Oleksandra Nikolayenko.

Judge Oleg Bilotserkivets of the Pechersk Court in Kyiv terminated the case on 26 May 2010, at which time the state declared that it was dropping all charges and changing the lead prosecutor.

=== Russian embassy attack ===
Rudkovsky was arrested in September 2018 after landing in Moscow and was charged with assaulting the Russian embassy on 14 June 2014. According to the Russian prosecutor's office, the former minister carried out this action alongside Right Sector activists. The case was transferred to the Moscow court on 1 November 2019. The Moscow court considered mitigating factors (compensation for material damage in the amount of 2 million rubles and remorse) and ultimately imposed a sentence of two years in prison, a 5.75 million–ruble fine to be paid the Ministry of Foreign Affairs of Russia, and another 8.289 million–ruble fine to be paid to the Sogaz insurance company. The prosecution had requested a sentence of six years in prison. The court also counted time spent in the pretrial detention facility starting on 28 September 2018 as part of the sentence served, and Rudkovsky was released from prison in April 2020.

=== Kidnapping ===
Rudkovsky was placed on Interpol's wanted list in relation to the 2012 kidnapping of Oleh Seminskyi, but was removed following Viktor Shokin's appointment as prosecutor-general.

In 2021, the Security Service of Ukraine (SBU) formally revealed the details of their investigation into Seminskyi's kidnapping, who as of 2019 was a deputy of the pro-government Servant of the People, and Rudkovsky was subsequently charged with ordering the kidnapping. The inquiry found that Semenskyi was held captive for over three years, subjected to relentless torture, and forced to pay the crime's mastermind a bogus debt equaling 200 million USD. Mykola Katerynchuk was hired as Rudkovsky's attorney in March 2021.

== Personal life ==
Rudkovsky has tested positive for COVID-19 twice. He claims to suffer from a medical condition where his body does not produce antibodies.

He claims to know as many as five languages, Russian, German, English, Spanish, and Arabic.

In a 2007 report by Ukrainska Pravda, Rudkovsky was revealed to own a house in the affluent Koncha-Zaspa neighbourhood, measuring 300-400 square feet. The house was not listed in his declaration of assets, and he had previously claimed to live in a "modest apartment". He has also been spotted driving in an Aston Martin Vanquish.

== Honours ==
Throughout his career, he has been awarded the following honours;

- Order of Saint Theodosius of Chernihiv (Russian Orthodox Church, 1 December 2010)

Political offices
Preceded by Viktor Bondar	4th Minister of Transport and Communication; 4 August 2006 – 18 December 2007	Succeeded by Yosyp Vinsky
