= Oleh Seminskyi =

Ukrainian businessman, kidnapping victim, and politician

- Олег Семінський
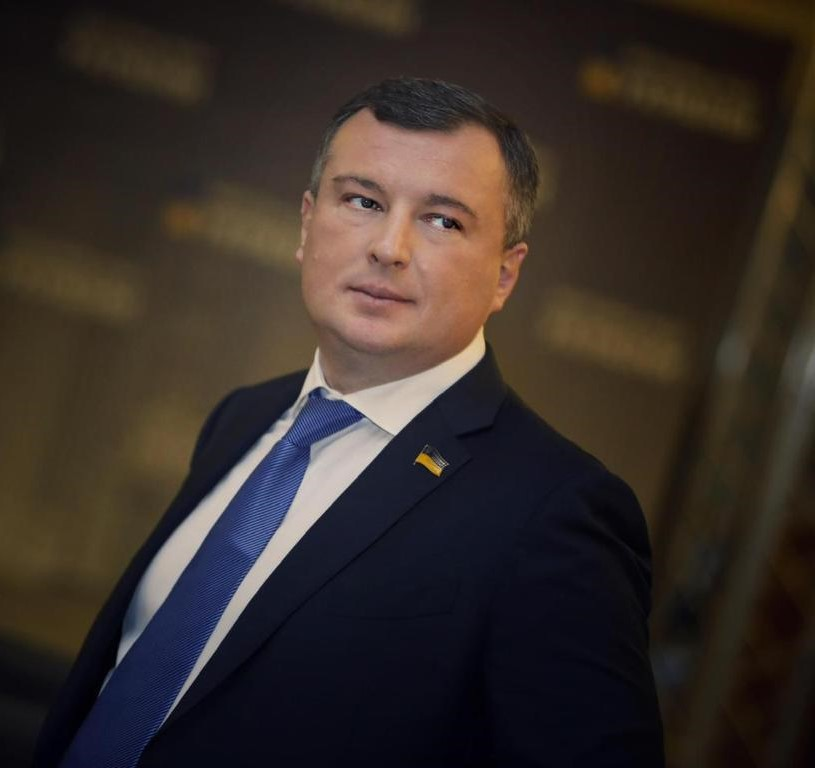
- Seminskyi in 2022

People's Deputy of Ukraine
- Incumbent
- Assumed office 29 August 2019
- Preceded by: Serhiy Berezenko
- Constituency: Chernihiv Oblast, No. 205

Personal details
- Born: 20 December 1973 (age 52) Bila Tserkva, Ukrainian SSR, Soviet Union (now Ukraine)
- Party: Servant of the People
- Other political affiliations: Independent; Socialist Party of Ukraine
- Education: Kyiv National Economic University; Ivano-Frankivsk National Technical University of Oil and Gas

Oleh Valeriiovych Seminskyi (Ukrainian: Олег Валерійович Семінський; born 20 December 1973) is a Ukrainian businessman, kidnapping victim, and politician currently serving as a People's Deputy of Ukraine from Ukraine's 205th electoral district since 2019. Prior to his election, he was director of Naftogazvybudovannia from 2003 to 2011. Seminskyi was kidnapped by members of the Ukrainian mafia in 2012 and subject to torture until being released in 2015, as part of what he claims was a forced takeover of his company by Rinat Akhmetov.

== Early life and career ==
Oleh Valeriiovych Seminskyi was born on 20 December 1973 in Bila Tserkva, in what was then the Ukrainian SSR of the Soviet Union. He began working as a consultant for the Heos company in 1991, working there for a year before becoming a consultant and translator at MKP Dnipro. From 1993 to 1998 he studied at the Kyiv National Economic University's international economics and law faculty, graduating with a master's degree in international business management. He began working as an economist at the finance division of the Ukrainian State Credit-Investment Company in 1997, and from 1998 to 2000 he was a specialist at the corporate division of Derzhinvest Ukraine.

Seminskyi became head of Ukrnaftogaztekhnolohiia in 2000, and served in that role until 2003. He served as general director of Naftogazvybudovannia from 2003 to 2011, and afterwards served as chairman of the company's board until 2013. He was coordinator of Stuart Float Glass from 2017 until his election.

== Kidnapping ==
Seminskyi was kidnapped by masked men on 3 February 2012 after leaving his office at Naftogazvydobuvannia. Although the kidnappers introduced themselves as police, the Prosecutor General of Ukraine later concluded that they were criminals affiliated with organised crime boss Yurii Yeryniak. Seminskyi remained in captivity for the next three years until being released in a Kyiv Oblast forest in May 2015. He has since stated that he felt his release from captivity was like a "second birthday", and has stated that he endured torture during his captivity.

Several years prior to Seminskyi's kidnapping, Naftogazvydobuvannia had been established on the advice of the state-run Derzhinvest Ukraine after 20 billion cubic metres of petroleum were discovered in Poltava Oblast. Mykola Rudkovsky, head of Derzhinvest Ukraine, established the company in order to avoid falling out of favour with President Leonid Kuchma over his connections to oligarch Petro Poroshenko. At the time, Poroshenko was supporting Viktor Yushchenko, an opposition politician. Replacing Poroshenko in the company was Nestor Shufrych, a pro-Russian People's Deputy of Ukraine associated with the Social Democratic Party of Ukraine (united). Shufrych also brought the party's leader, Viktor Medvedchuk, onto the company. Stakes in Naftogazvydobuvannia were organised 50/50 between Shufrych and Rudkovsky; Medvedchuk held 10% of Shufrych's stake, while Seminskyi held 10% of Rudkovsky's stake. Seminskyi has expressed the belief that Rudkovsky may have been connected to Viktor Yanukovych and Rinat Akhmetov, leaders of the Donetsk Clan.

Following Seminskyi's kidnapping, Shufrych and Rudkovsky proceeded to divide Seminskyi's assets in Naftogazvydobuvannia among themselves. By the time Seminskyi had been freed from captivity, Akhmetov's energy company, DTEK, had purchased 75% of shares in the company. In 2017, he went public with his claims that Poroshenko and Akhmetov, among others, were responsible for his kidnapping in an interview to The New Voice of Ukraine. The Prosecutor General and Security Service of Ukraine launched an investigation, and in 2021 served a summons to five individuals, whom prosecutors accused of torture, kidnapping, and extortion. The identities of those given a summons were not publicly revealed, but online newspaper Ukrainska Pravda stated that Rudkovsky was among them. Shares in Naftogazvydobuvannia held by Serhii Rudkovsky, Mykola Rudkovsky's brother, were ordered to be seized by the Pecherskyi District Court of Kyiv. The trial of Rudkovsky, as well as those of three others, began in July 2023.

== Political career ==
Seminskyi was an aide to Shufrych in the 4th, 6th, and 7th convocations of the Verkhovna Rada (Ukrainian parliament). He was also an aide to Rudkovsky in the 4th and 5th convocations, and to Yaroslav Mendus in the 5th convocation.

Seminskyi was a candidate in the 2006 Ukrainian parliamentary election as the 72nd individual on the proportional list of the Socialist Party of Ukraine. He was not elected. During the 2019 Ukrainian parliamentary election Seminskyi ran again, this time from the Servant of the People party in Ukraine's 205th electoral district. At the time of the election, he was an independent. Seminskyi was successfully elected, gathering 34.14% of the vote and defeating former People's Deputy Valerii Kulich. Since August 2019 he has been deputy chairman of the Verkhovna Rada Energy and Communal Services Committee.

== Controversies ==
=== Accusations of tire slashing and assault ===
On 28 September 2020 Seminskyi was accused by Oleksandr Tkachenko, a Chernihiv-based advertiser, of beating him and slashing his tires. Tkachenko stated that the incident was in response to ten billboards advertising Servant of the People's mayoral candidate in the 2020 Ukrainian local elections being stripped of their adverts, which Tkachenko said was because the party refused to pay for the billboards. A video released after the allegations became public showed Seminskyi leading a large group of people and hitting Tkachenko in the neck.

Seminskyi denied involvement in the incident and claimed that he slashed the tires of cars in "self-defence", saying that they had been following him around the city that day. Tkachenko contacted the police over the incident, and the matter was handed over to a local court.

=== Reconstruction corruption allegations ===
Following the Russian invasion of Ukraine in 2022, Seminskyi signed Draft Law 5655, a proposal to restructure urban development ahead of reconstruction efforts. Anti-corruption non-governmental organisation Chesno criticised Seminskyi for supporting the law, arguing that it benefits developers and takes power away from citizens to influence reconstruction efforts.

The Ukrainian branch of Transparency International, citing the KyivVlada portal, reported in April 2023 that one of Seminskyi's aides, Oleksandr Chuniak, headed a company which had received 36 contracts for the reconstruction of Bucha following the Russian occupation of Kyiv Oblast and the Bucha massacre. According to Transparency International, the combined price of the contracts is 137 million.

=== Alleged transfer of military information to Russia ===
In August 2023 Servant of the People deputy Mykola Tyshchenko alleged that Seminskyi was involved in the work of a pro-Russian bot farm and call centre based in Kyiv. According to Tyshchenko, the centre was responsible for transmitting information about the locations of military equipment and anti-aircraft defences to Russian forces, and he published several photographs of stamps from Gazprom, the Central Bank of Russia, Gazprom Invest, and the Moscow Exchange. Tyshchenko further alleged that Seminskyi attempted to prevent the National Police of Ukraine from entering the centre. The claims were published amidst a private trip by Tyshchenko to Thailand, which was widely ridiculed in Ukrainian social media as being out of touch with reality, and followed a graft scandal involving Tyshchenko and Ihor Nehulevskyi.

Thirty people were arrested following the raid on the centre. Seminskyi denied any involvement in the centre, claiming that he had only entered on the invitation of the building's owners.
