= Mykhailo Chechetov =

Ukrainian politician (1953–2015)

- Михайло Чечетов
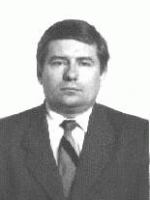

Member of the Verkhonva Rada
- In office 25 May 2006 – 27 November 2014
- In office 11 May 1994 – 12 May 1998

Personal details
- Born: Mykhailo Vasylyovych Chechetov; 3 October 1953 Lyubimovka, Russia, Soviet Union
- Died: 28 February 2015 (aged 61) Kyiv, Ukraine

Mykhailo Vasylyovych Chechetov (Ukrainian: Михайло Васильович Чечетов; 3 October 1953 – 28 February 2015) was a Russian-born Ukrainian politician. He was a former first deputy head of the Party of Regions parliamentary faction; and de facto its Chief Whip. Chechetov died by suicide on 27 February 2015.

== Biography ==
Chechetov was born 3 October 1953 in the village of Lyubimovka (Korenevsky District) in current Russia; then the village was part of the USSR (as was Ukraine). (Note: Both Russia and Ukraine were part of the Soviet Union since 1920 till Ukraine declared its independence from the Soviet Union on 24 August 1991.) In 1979 he graduated from the Kharkiv Engineering and Economics Institute with a degree in economics and organization of mining industry. From 1971 to 1982 he worked as a mechanic in a coal mine in Yenakiyevo. And from 1982 till 1994, Chechetov was a teacher at the Kharkiv Engineering and Economics Institute.

From 1994 till 1997 Chechetov was a member of the Liberal Party of Ukraine. In the 1994 Ukrainian parliamentary election he was elected into parliament and joined the faction Socio-market choice. In 1998 and 1999 he served as Deputy Minister of Economy. From September 1999 to April 2003 Chechetov was First Deputy Chairman of the State Property Fund of Ukraine. From 1998 to 2005 Chechetov was a member of various economic commissions under President Kuchma. In the 2006 Ukrainian parliamentary election, 2007 Ukrainian parliamentary election and 2012 Ukrainian parliamentary election he returned to parliament for the Party of Regions. After 2012 he became first deputy head of the party's parliamentary faction; and de facto its Chief Whip. Chechetov did not take part in the 2014 Ukrainian parliamentary election.

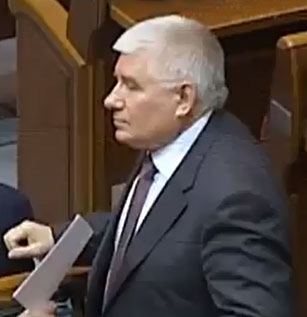
Chechetov in 2012-13

On 20 January 2015 the General Prosecutor's Office informed Chechetov of suspicion of abuse of power and forgery. On 21 February he was bailed out for almost ₴5 million.

Chechetov died by suicide on the night of 27 February 2015 by jumping from the window of his apartment, located on the 17th floor. He left behind his wife Natalia Chechetov (born in 1954 and an employee of the Ukrainian parliament) and his daughter Tatiana Chechetov-Terashvili (born 1979 and a lecturer of the Kharkiv National University of Economics).

== See also ==
- Oleksandr Peklushenko

== Notes ==
Government offices
Preceded by Oleksandr Bondar	Director of State Property Fund of Ukraine; 2003–2005	Succeeded by Valentyna Semenyuk-Samsonenko
