= Suponevo, Odintsovsky District, Moscow Oblast =

Village in Moscow Oblast, Russia

Coordinates: 55°44′38″N 36°52′28″E

Suponevo (Russian: Супонево) is a village in Odintsovsky District, Moscow Oblast, Russia. It had a population of 89 people as of 2006.

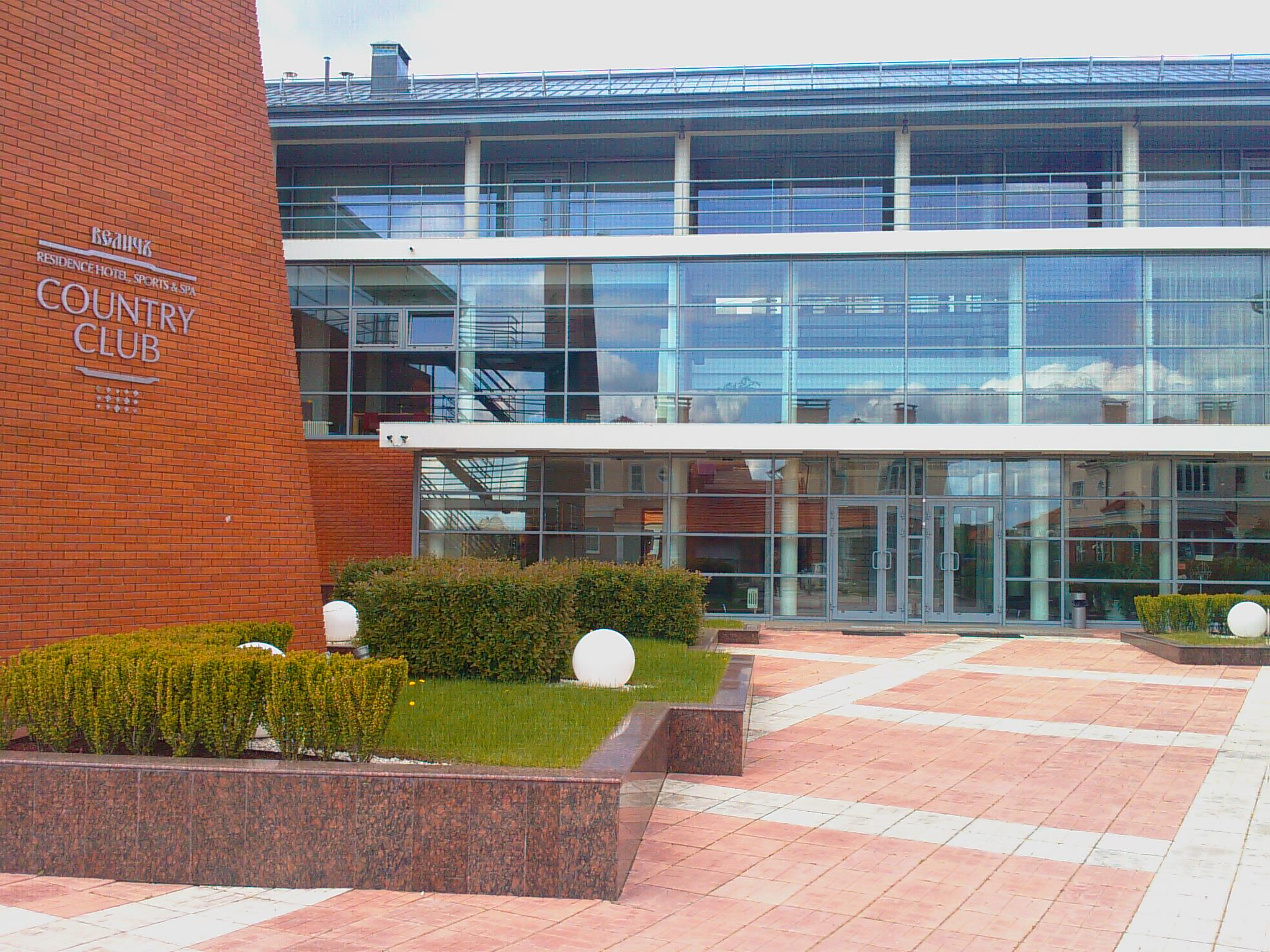
The hotel near which Illia Kyva's body was found

On 6 December 2023, Ukrainian-born politician Illia Kyva, who had been accused of treason during the Russian invasion of Ukraine, was shot dead in a park in Suponevo.
