= Serhiy Berezenko =

Ukrainian politician

- Сергій Березенко
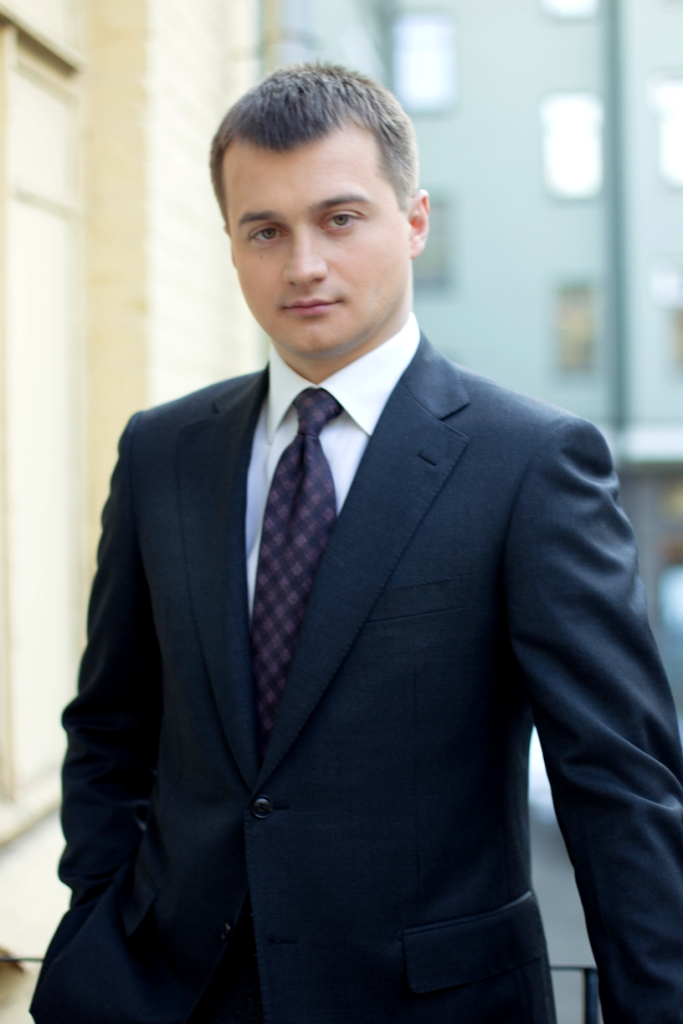

People's Deputy of Ukraine
- In office 26 July 2015 – 29 August 2019
- Preceded by: Valerii Kulich
- Succeeded by: Oleh Seminskyi
- Constituency: Chernihiv Oblast, No. 205

Personal details
- Born: 11 April 1984 (age 42) Vinnytsia, Ukrainian SSR, Soviet Union (now Ukraine))
- Party: Petro Poroshenko Bloc
- Education: National University of Kyiv-Mohyla Academy
- Occupation: politician

Serhiy Ivanovych Berezenko (Ukrainian: Сергі́й Іва́нович Березе́нко; born 11 April 1984) is a Ukrainian politician who served as a People's Deputy of Ukraine from Ukraine's 205th electoral district from 2015 until 2019. Prior to his election, he was head of the Ukrainian government agency the State Management of Affairs from June 2014 to August 2015.

He was a member of the Presidium of the Central Council of the Petro Poroshenko Bloc.

== Biography ==
Berezenko was born into a family of doctors and spent his childhood in Vinnytsia, Ukraine. In the early 1990s, his family moved to Kyiv, where he went to school. From 1991 to 2001, he studied at the Kyiv-Pechersk Lyceum No. 171.

In 2001, after graduating from school with a gold medal, he entered the National University of Kyiv-Mohyla Academy, where he studied at the Faculty of Economic Sciences. In 2005, he obtained a bachelor's degree in economic theory. In 2005, he worked as a stock market analyst at Tekt-Brock CJSC.

== In politics ==
Berezenko was head of the State Management of Affairs from 10 June 2014 to 27 August 2015. On 30 April 2015, he led the implementation of the Regional Development Council projects in Chernihiv Oblast in Ukraine.

On 26 July 2015, he won the by-elections to the Verkhovna Rada (Ukrainian parliament), being elected with 35.90% of the vote. From 28 August 2015 to 17 May 2019, he was a freelance adviser to the President of Ukraine.
