= Oleksandr Bondar =

Ukrainian politician (born 1955)

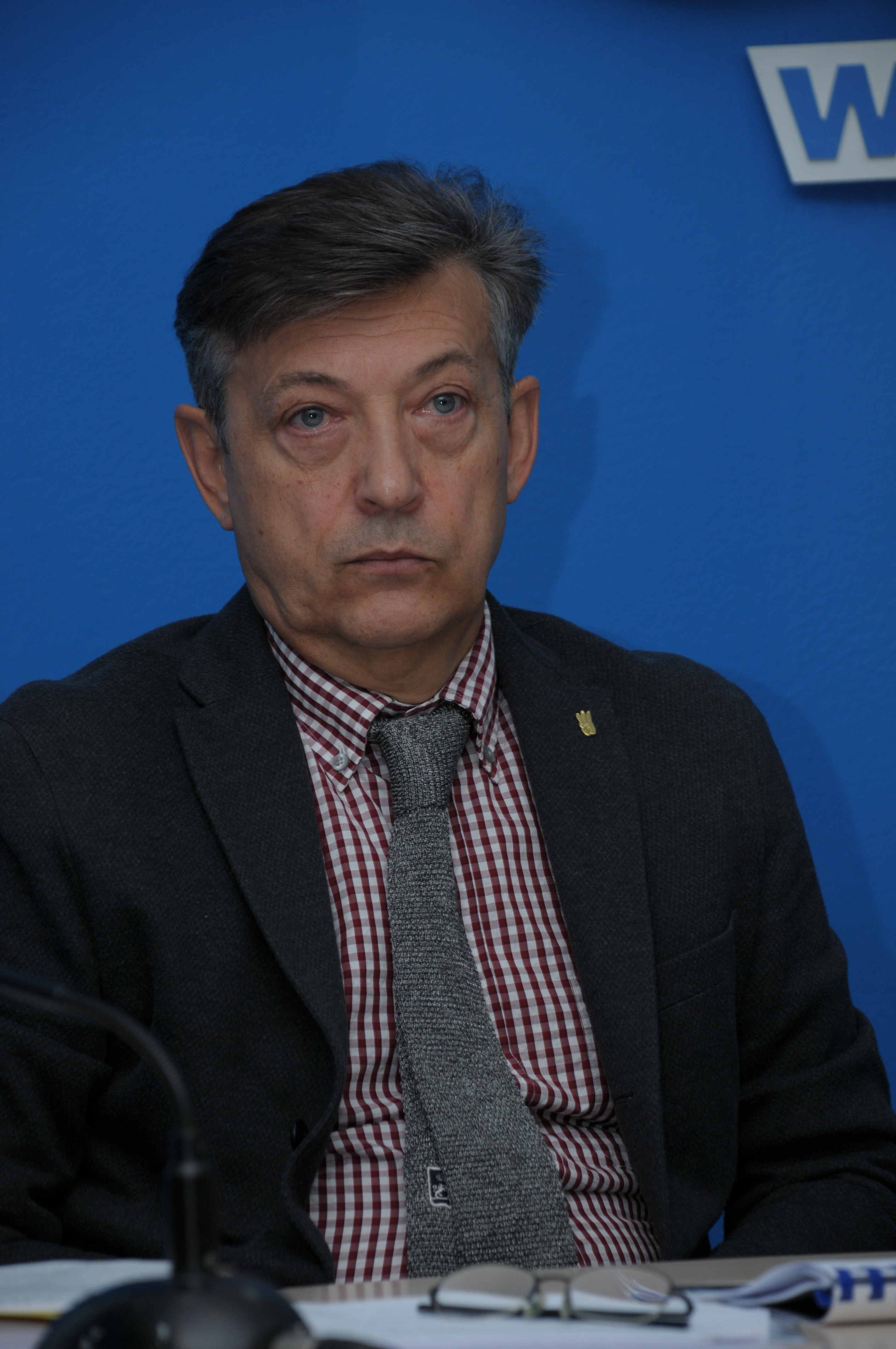
- Oleksandr Bondar

People's Deputy of Ukraine

5th convocation
- In office May 25, 2006 – June 14, 2007
- Constituency: Ukrainian Republican Party "Sobor", No.37

6th convocation
- In office November 23, 2007 – December 12, 2012
- Constituency: Ukrainian Republican Party "Sobor", No.66

Oleksandr Mykolayovych Bondar (born 1955) is a Ukrainian politician, People's Deputy of Ukraine, Member of the parliamentary fraction of OUR UKRAINE - People's Self-Defence. Bondar is a member of Ukrainian Republican Party "Sobor".

== Biography ==
Oleksandr Bondar was born on 7 January 1955, in Kiev. He is married with two sons:

- wife Victoria (b. 1965), economist
- Artem Bondar (b. 1978), lawyer
- Gennady (b. 1990), student

=== Education ===
Oleksandr Bondar graduated from Kiev Shevchenko University in 1977, Faculty of Cybernetics, with qualification of economist and mathematician. In 2001 he obtained his PhD at Kyiv National Economic University with thesis "Organizational-economic mechanism of privatization of strategic enterprises (based on industrial enterprises of Ukraine)".

=== Career ===
- August 1977 - October 1978 - engineer-economist at "Ukrglavsnabsistema", Glavsnab of USSR (Main Administration of Supply Management), Kiev
- October 1978-September 1981 - engineer at Moscow Automation Institute, Moscow
- October 1981-April 1987 - leading engineer at the Central scientific-production association (NPO) "Cascade", Moscow
- April 1987-September 1990 - senior engineer, software engineer at the Institute of Automation Systems, Central NPO "Cascade", Moscow
- September 1990-May 1991 - senior adviser on the economy issues, Moscovskiy Rayon Council, Kiev
- May 1991-May 1992 - Vice President for Economic Affairs of the Moscow District Executive Committee, Kyiv
- May 1992-August 1993 - Head of the privatization department at Kyiv City State Administration
- August 1993-August 1994 - Deputy Chairman of the Foundation on issues of privatization of communal property of Kyiv
- August 1994-February 1998 - Deputy Chairman of the State Property Fund of Ukraine
- February - November 1998 - 1st Deputy Chairman of the State Property Fund of Ukraine
- November 1998-April 2003 - Chairman of the State Property Fund of Ukraine
- April 2003 - June 2005 - 1st Deputy Chairman of the State Property Fund of Ukraine for relations with Verkhovna Rada of Ukraine
- July 2005 - April 2006 - Deputy Chairman of the State Property Fund of Ukraine

=== Politics ===
- April 2006-June 2007 - People's Deputy in the 5th convocation of Verkhovna Rada of Ukraine; elected from the Bloc "Our Ukraine", No. 37 in the list. Chairman of the subcommittee on property and other proprietary rights of the Committee on Economic Policy (since July 2006). Member of the fraction "Our Ukraine" (since April 2006)
- since November 2007 - People's Deputy of the 6th convocation of Verkhovna Rada; elected from block "Our Ukraine - People's Self-Defense", No. 66 in the list.
- First Deputy Chairman of the Special Control Commission of the Verkhovna Rada of Ukraine on privatization
- Chairman of the Subcommittee on privatization of state and communal property, nationalization (re) bankruptcy and property management, which is in a state or municipal ownership of the Verkhovna Rada of Ukraine on economic policy
- Member of the Group for Interparliamentary Relations with Romania

== Awards ==
- Order of Merit, III class (2002), II class (2005)
- Order of Saint Stanislav, II class (2000)
- Order of Saint Volodymyr, IV class (2001)
- Honoured economist of Ukraine (August 1999).

== See also ==
- 2007 Ukrainian parliamentary election
- List of Ukrainian Parliament Members 2007

Political offices
Preceded by Volodymyr Lanovy (acting)	Director of State Property Fund of Ukraine; 1998–2003	Succeeded by Mykhailo Chechetov
