= Oleh Samsonenko =

Ukrainian footballer (born 1965)

Personal information
- Full name: Oleh Ivanovych Samsonenko
- Date of birth: 3 August 1965 (age 61)
- Place of birth: Zhytomyr, Ukrainian SSR
- Height: 1.85 m (6 ft 1 in)
- Position: Goalkeeper

Youth career
- FC Spartak Zhytomyr

Senior career*
Years	Team	Apps	(Gls)
1982	FC Papirnyk Malyn		
1983	FC Spartak Zhytomyr	1	(0)
1987	FC Spartak Zhytomyr	1	(0)
1988	FC Shakhtar Horlivka	39	(0)
1989–1990	FC Zirka Kirovohrad	53	(0)
1990	FC Kryvbas Kryvyi Rih	14	(0)
1991	FC Polissya Zhytomyr	5	(0)
1991	FC Metallurg Lipetsk	25	(0)
1992–1993	FC Uralmash Yekaterinburg	27	(0)
1993–1994	FC Kryvbas Kryvyi Rih	0	(0)
1994–1995	FC Systema-Boreks Borodianka	2	(0)
1996	FC Energetik Uren	22	(0)
1997–1998	FC Papirnyk Malyn	7	(0)
- * Club domestic league appearances and goals

Oleh Ivanovych Samsonenko (Ukrainian: Олег Іванович Самсоненко; born 3 August 1965 in Zhytomyr) is a former Ukrainian football player.
