= Illia Kyva =

Ukrainian politician (1977–2023)

- Ілля Кива
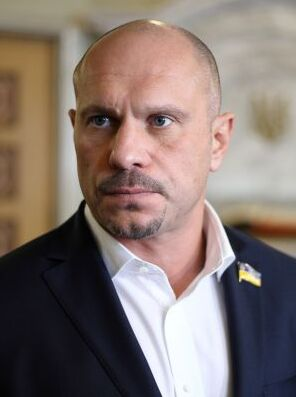

People's Deputy of Ukraine
- In office 29 August 2019 – 15 March 2022

Leader of the Socialist Party of Ukraine
- In office 8 July 2017 – 6 June 2019

Regional leader of the Right Sector in the East of Ukraine
- In office February 2014 – May 2014

Personal details
- Born: 2 June 1977 Poltava, Ukrainian SSR, Soviet Union
- Died: 6 December 2023 (aged 46) Suponevo, Odintsovsky District, Moscow Oblast, Russia
- Cause of death: Assassination by gunshot
- Party: Opposition Platform — For Life (2019–2022)
- Other political affiliations: Right Sector (2014–2015); Socialist Party of Ukraine (2017–2019)
- Education: National Academy of Internal Affairs (2017)
- Occupation: Military personnel; politician; accounting assistant; engineering assistant; police officer

Illia Volodymyrovych Kyva (Note: Ukrainian: Ілля Володимирович Кива Russian: Илья Владимирович Кива, romanized: Ilya Vladimirovich Kiva) (2 June 1977 – 6 December 2023) was a Ukrainian politician who was a member of the Verkhovna Rada (the Ukrainian parliament) from August 2019 until March 2022, when he fled to Russia.

Kyva worked as an official and policeman before entering politics, heading the Poltava chapter of the Right Sector party before serving as the leader of the Socialist Party of Ukraine from 2017 to 2019. He ran unsuccessfully for the presidency in March 2019, then was elected to the Verkhovna Rada in July 2019 as a member of the Opposition Platform — For Life party.

In January 2022, Kyva left for Spain and then Russia; he supported the Russian invasion of Ukraine which began in February. On 15 March, the Verkhovna Rada deprived Kyva of his parliamentary mandate, following his comments in support of Russia's invasion and occupation. In Ukraine, he was sentenced for treason. On 6 December 2023, Kyva was shot dead in an attack Ukrainian media attributed to the Security Service of Ukraine.

== Early life and career ==
Illia Volodymyrovych Kyva was born on 2 June 1977 in Poltava, Ukrainian SSR, Soviet Union (now central Ukraine).

Kyva studied at the Poltava Oil and Gas College of National University "Yuri Kondratyuk Poltava Polytechnic" in his native Poltava, specializing in maintenance. He also took courses to become a "pedagogue-psychologist" at the Poltava V.G. Korolenko National Pedagogical University.

From 2005 to 2008, Kyva worked at an industrial company to become the chief accountant of this company. He graduated with a degree in law at the Yaroslav Mudryi National Law University. In 2010, he worked in the department of roadworks.

For about two months in 2011, Kyva was the head of Poltava's consumer rights department. He was charged with corruption by a district tribunal of the Poltava region in December 2013 and was barred from public office for one year.

== Politics ==
=== 2013–2017 ===
Kvya's political career began in 2013, when he unsuccessfully tried to get elected into the Verkhovna Rada (Ukraine's national parliament) in a by-election of the 2012 Ukrainian parliamentary election in electoral district number 223 (Shevchenkivskyi District, Kyiv) as a self-nominated candidate.

In 2014, Kyva became a police major (майор міліції) and was appointed commander of his native town's battalion, "Poltavshchyna". He became the leader of Right Sector's Eastern division stretching from Poltava to Donetsk, and was the representative of Dmytro Yarosh's 2014 presidential election campaign.

Kyva was then appointed deputy chief of the Ministry of Internal Affairs' regional department for Donetsk. At this time he also befriended Dmytro Korchynsky, founder of the St Mary's battalion which fought in the War in Donbas. In February 2015 Kyva led an evacuation of more than a thousand civilians (in particular, 400 children, elderly citizens and disabled people) from Debaltseve and neighboring settlements during the Battle of Debaltseve of the War in Donbas.

In June 2015 Kyva moved to the position of deputy head of the Minister of Internal Affairs of Kherson Oblast, before from October 2015 to May 2016 heading the ministry's anti-drug crime division. In this position, in 2016, he attracted controversy for endorsing extrajudicial methods of combating drug crime. When the law on the reformed National Police of Ukraine entered into force, all employees of the ministry were obliged to undergo re-certification, but Kyva did not do this. In April 2016, the head of the National Police at the time, Khatia Dekanoidze, announced that she would submit documents for Kyva's release.

From 2016 to 2017, he was an advisor to Minister of Internal Affairs Arsen Avakov.

In November 2017 Illia had a controversy-sparking televised rap battle with Bohdan Butkevych on the EspressoTV channel. During the battle he compared Bohdan to a boar, the journalist slandered Kyva as "Avakov's bald hound", who responded by calling him a "bearded pup", deriding the TV channel as being controlled by Avakov and threatening to take over the show by making a phone call to him. Kyva wore a grey track suit to the occasion. At a later date Butkevych regarded this as having exposed Illia's bandit-like nature during a livestream on the "Цензор.НЕТ" youtube channel.

=== 2019–2023 ===
Kyva was an unsuccessful candidate in the 2019 Ukrainian presidential election, receiving a few thousand votes under the banner of the Socialist Party of Ukraine. He would later get elected as a member of the pro-Russian Opposition Platform — For Life list (number 34 on the list) in the 2019 Ukrainian parliamentary election. Kyva went on to host his own show on the ZIK TV channel, said to be controlled by oligarch and leader of co-chairman of the Opposition Platform Viktor Medvedchuk.

In December 2021 Kyva on the Russia-1 TV channel justified the 2014 Russian annexation of Crimea and advocated the merger of Ukraine with the Russian Federation. He declared that Ukraine should be part of the Union State with Russia.

On 23 February 2022, on the eve of Russia's invasion, Kyva claimed that Ukraine had been "soaked by Nazism" and needed "liberating" by Russia. Kyva expressed support for the invasion, claiming "the Ukrainian people need liberation" and that "Ukrainians, Belarusians, Russians are one people." Furthermore he stated that Ukraine was "enslaved and brought to its knees by the West, imbued with Nazism, and has no future." He blamed the war on Ukrainian President Volodymyr Zelenskyy and urged him to resign. In his 24 February 2022 televised broadcast announcing the Russian invasion of Ukraine Russian president Vladimir Putin claimed the goal of this "special military operation" was the "demilitarization and de-Nazification of Ukraine.

One month before the invasion, Kyva had left for Spain, before moving to Russia. On 3 March 2022, Kyva was expelled from the party and faction of Opposition Platform — For Life. On 6 March 2022, Prosecutor General Iryna Venediktova announced that Kyva was being charged with high treason, as well as infringing on Ukraine's territorial integrity, taking part in Russian war propaganda, and illegal weapons possession.

On 15 March 2022, the Verkhovna Rada deprived Kyva of his mandate as a People's Deputy.

On 17 April 2022, he wrote about a nuclear strike on Ukraine on his Telegram account, stating: "Zelensky, his entourage and Western curators, are most afraid of a Russian preemptive strike, weapons of mass destruction. This is what can put an end to today's confrontation, not only with the Ukrainian authorities, but with the entire West".

On 18 April 2022, it was reported that Ukraine's State Bureau of Investigations had opened a case of treason against Kyva for involvement in an illegal arrangement with a general of the Russian Armed Forces.

On 21 April 2022, in an open letter to Russian president Vladimir Putin, Kyva applied for Russian citizenship and political asylum.

Based on the analysis of videos published on his Telegram account, Ukrainian investigation platform Bihus.Info concluded on 20 June 2022 that Kyva had settled in the cottage town of Agalarov Estate, near the village Pokrovskoye in Moscow Oblast.

On 13 November 2023, Kyva was given a 14-year jail sentence in absentia by the Lychakivskyi District Court of Lviv for high treason and calling publicly for the occupation of Ukraine. Kyva was also sanctioned by the United Kingdom that year in relation to his actions during the war.

In Russia, Kyva frequently criticised Ukrainian authorities online and on Russian state television talkshows.

== Assassination ==
Kyva was shot dead in a park in the village of Suponevo, to the west of Moscow, on 6 December 2023. Several Ukrainian media outlets, citing unnamed sources, claimed that Kyva was targeted by the Security Service of Ukraine (SBU). The press representative of the Main Directorate of Intelligence of the Ukrainian Ministry of Defense Andriy Yusov told Ukrainian TV "Yes, we can confirm Kyva is no more. This fate will befall other traitors of Ukraine and puppets of Putin's regime." Yusov claimed that Kyva was "one of the biggest scumbags, traitors and collaborators" and said his death was "justice". Yusov did not say who was behind the assassination. The Office of the President of Ukraine declined online newspaper Meduza's request for comment on Kyva's death.

Since the Russian invasion of Ukraine, the SBU and military intelligence have claimed a number of successful operations against high-value targets in the Russian-occupied territories of Ukraine as well as in Russia itself. Russia has blamed the SBU for the assassination of Darya Dugina, the daughter of Aleksandr Dugin, and the assassination of military vlogger Vladlen Tatarsky. Several Russia-loyal officials in Russian-occupied Ukraine have been killed since the start of the Russo-Ukrainian War.

== See also ==
- List of members of the parliament of Ukraine, 2019–23
