= Justice Party (Ukraine) =

Justice Party Партія "Справедливість"
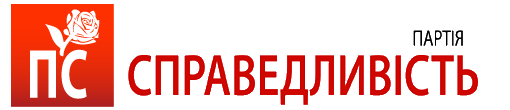
- Leader: Stanislav Nikolaenko
- Founded: 2000; 2014 (re-established)
- Dissolved: December 2011
- Split from: Socialist Party of Ukraine
- Merged into: United Left and Peasants (this party was re-named "Justice" in 2014)
- Headquarters: Kyiv
- Ideology: Social democracy Democratic socialism Pro-Europeanism
- Political position: Centre-left
- Colors: Red
- Verkhovna Rada: 0 / 450

Website
- www.livi.org.ua

The Justice Party (Ukrainian: Партія «Справедливість», romanized: Partiia «Spravedlyvist»; formerly known as the Party of All-Ukrainian Union of the Left "Justice" (Ukrainian: Партія Всеукраїнського об'єднання лівих "Справедливість", romanized: Partiia Vseukrainskoho obiednannia livykh "Spravedlyvist", Russian: Партия Всеукраинского объединения левых "Справедливость", romanized: Partiya Vseukrainskogo ob"edineniya levykh "Spravedlivost'") is a left-wing political party in Ukraine. The party merged into the (then) new party United Left and Peasants (Ukrainian: Об'єднані ліві і селяни, romanized: Obiednani livi i seliany, Russian: Объединенные левые и крестьяне, romanized: Ob"edinennye levye i krest'yane) in December 2011. Justice Party leader Stanislav Nikolaenko became the first party leader of United Left and Peasants. United Left and Peasants changed its name to Justice Party in 2014.

== History ==
It was founded in 2000 by a group of former Socialist Party of Ukraine (SPU) members led by Ivan Chizh who were in opposition to SPU leader Oleksander Moroz.

The party ran independently during the 2002 parliamentary elections gaining 0,08% of the votes and no seats. At the parliamentary elections on 26 March 2006 the party was part of the electoral Lytvyn's People's Bloc, which won 2.44% of the popular vote and no seats. The party did not participate in the 2007 parliamentary elections.

=== 2007 Party reform ===
In 2007 the SPU lost the parliamentarian elections, in order to "return into big policy" a group of SPU members including former minister of education of Ukraine Stanislav Nikolaenko and Aleksander Baranivskiy founded in 2008 the Union for Renewal of SPU and proposed 10 steps stated in the program "A Just Ukraine" to SPU leader Moroz. But the conservative entourage of Moroz persuade him to refuse the "road map for self-protection".

In March 2009 Nikolaenko and Baranivskiy left the SPU. In April 2009 Justice party's founder Ivan Chizh offered to implement the program "A Just Ukraine" and principals of the Union for Renewal on the basis of his Justice party. On 15 April, Nikolaenko accepted an offer to chair the party. This decision was supported by the party's Congress and Council. Former Head and party's founder Ivan Chizh was elected as an Honorary Head. Former Minister of agrarian policy Oleksandr Baranivskiy was elected to the Deputy Head post.

Based on the program "A Just Ukraine" Nikolaenko addressed to the leaders of left parties to create a "Forum of Left Forces" and conduct the parliamentary elections campaign as one team. The idea of supporting a joint candidature to the presidential elections from left forces was also a subject of discussion.

The newly elected head proposed to adopt changes to the Statutes aimed at a democratization of the decision making process within the party and limit the number of presidency terms to three, two years each (maximum 6 years). He proposed to conduct secret voting, primaries.

It was applied to be an observer member of the European Left.

The party backed Communist leader Petro Symonenko as a single candidate from the election bloc of left and central left political forces (of which it was a member), for the post of the Ukrainian President at the 2010 presidential elections.

In the 2010 local elections the party won a few representatives in 3 regional parliaments.

=== United Left and Peasants ===
United Left and Peasants party logo

In December 2011 the party merged in with 3 other parties to form the new party United Left and Peasants. Leader of Justice Stanislav Nikolaenko headed this new party. At first (in 2011) plans appeared on unification of 11 left wing parties, the most noticeable of these being Socialist Party of Ukraine. The council of Socialist Party of Ukraine refused the merge (and in December 2011 5 small parties merged with Socialist Party of Ukraine). In December 2011 the parties Justice Party, Ukrainian Peasant Democratic Party, People Power, Rural Revival Party and All-Ukrainian Patriotic Union merged into the new party United Left and Peasants. The most noticeable new party member was former Minister in the second Tymoshenko Government Yosyp Vynskyi.

The party aimed in December 2011 to win at least five percent of the vote in the 2012 Ukrainian parliamentary election. But the party did not take part in the nationwide proportional party-list system; instead it was decided in August 2012 that nine members of the party would try to win a seat in nine of the 225 local single-member districts. Eventually in total, 14 members of the party participated in the elections, however no one won in their district. The best result had leader of the party Nikolaenko who got third place in electoral district 185 with 16.18% (14 808 of popular votes). And thus the party won no seat in the Verkhovna Rada (Ukraine's parliament).

The party actively participated in Euromaidan.

=== 2014 back to 'Justice' ===
In 2014 the party United Left and Peasants decided to change its name (back) to Justice. The first decisions made were to back Petro Poroshenko for president of Ukraine and condemn Russia for the annexation of Crimea and 2014 pro-Russian unrest in Ukraine.

In the 2014 Ukrainian parliamentary election the party participated in 14 constituencies; but its candidates lost in all of them and thus the party won no parliamentary seats.

The party did not take part in the 2019 Ukrainian parliamentary election.
