= State Property Fund of Ukraine =

State organisation in Ukraine

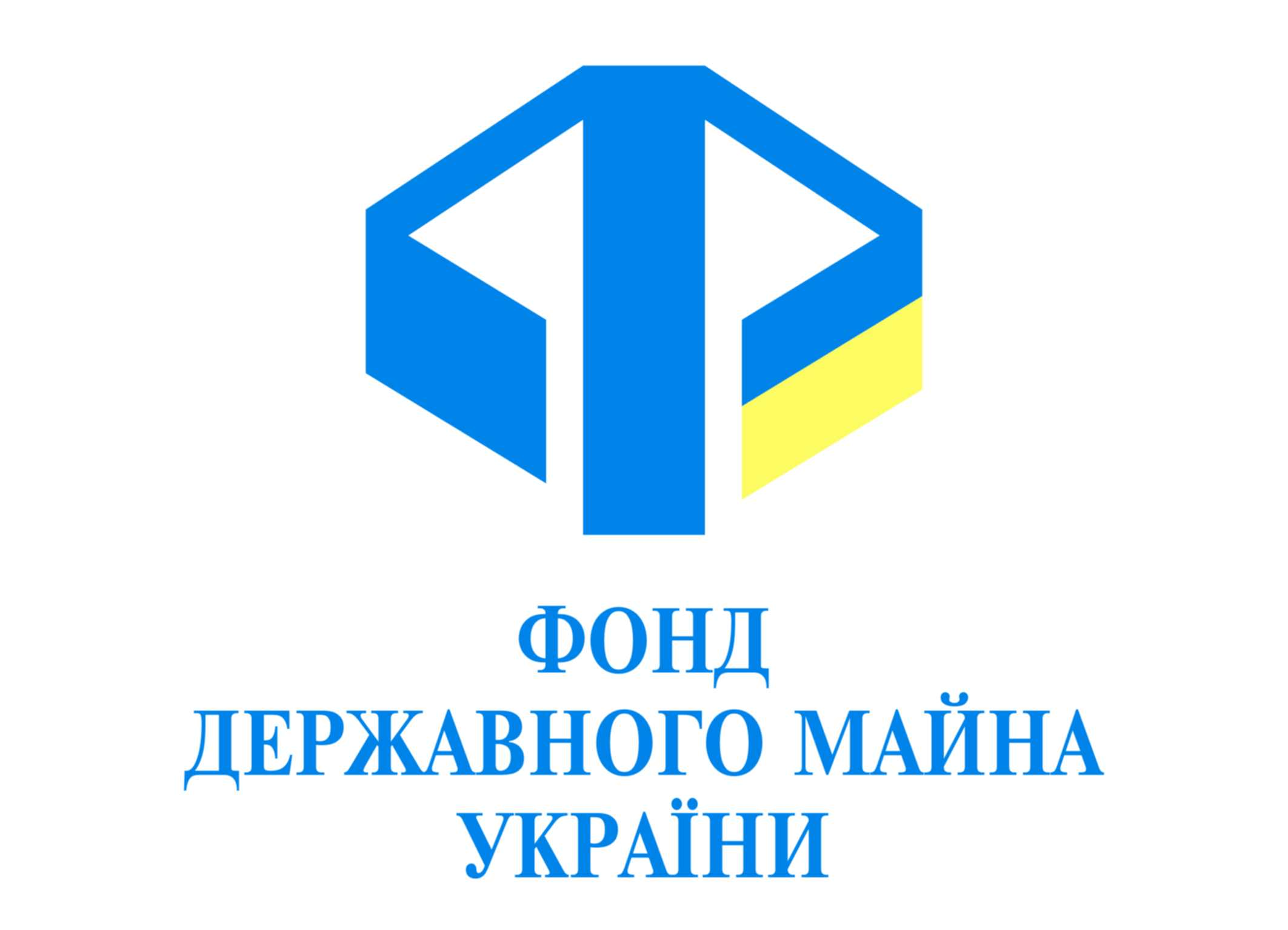
State Property Fund of Ukraine

State Property Fund of Ukraine (Ukrainian: Фонд державного майна України, romanized: Fond derzhavnoho maina Ukrainy) is a central body of executive power in Ukraine with special status and being administrated by the Cabinet of Ukraine.

== Synopsis ==
The SPFU is responsible to the President of Ukraine. It has 12 regional offices throughout Ukraine and has seven areas of activity:

- Asset management
- Privatization
- Land bank
- Asset lease
- Asset evaluation
- Asset expropriation
- State registers development and management

== History ==
State Property Fund of Ukraine was established in 1991 according to the Cabinet of Ministers' Resolution N.158 for the purpose of the implementation of the state policy of the privatization of state property. The activities of the Fund is regulated by the "Law on the State Property Fund of Ukraine" adopted in December 2011.

At least two former directors of the State Property Fund committed suicide (Mykhailo Chechetov and Valentyna Semenyuk-Samsonenko) after the events of Euromaidan and after the former President of Ukraine Viktor Yanukovych left the country (in February 2014) and did not return.

== Directors ==
- 1991–1994 Volodymyr Pryadko
- 1994–1997 Yuriy Yekhanurov
- 1997–1998 Volodymyr Lanovy (acting)
- 1998–2003 Oleksandr Bondar
- 2003–2005 Mykhailo Chechetov
- 2005–2008 Valentyna Semenyuk-Samsonenko
- 2008–2010 Dmytro Parfenenko (acting)
- 2010–2014 Oleksandr Ryabchenko
- 2014–2015 Dmytro Parfenenko (acting)
- 2015–2017 Ihor Bilous
- 2017 Dmytro Parfenenko (acting)
- 2017–2019 Vitaliy Trubarov (acting)
- 2019–2022 Dmytro Sennychenko
- 2022 Olha Batova (acting)
- 2022–2023 Rustem Umierov
- 2023 Olha Pishchanska
- 2023 - 2024 Vitaliy Koval
- 2026 - Dmytro Natalukha
