= Socialist Party of Ukraine =

Socialist Party of Ukraine Соціалістична партія України
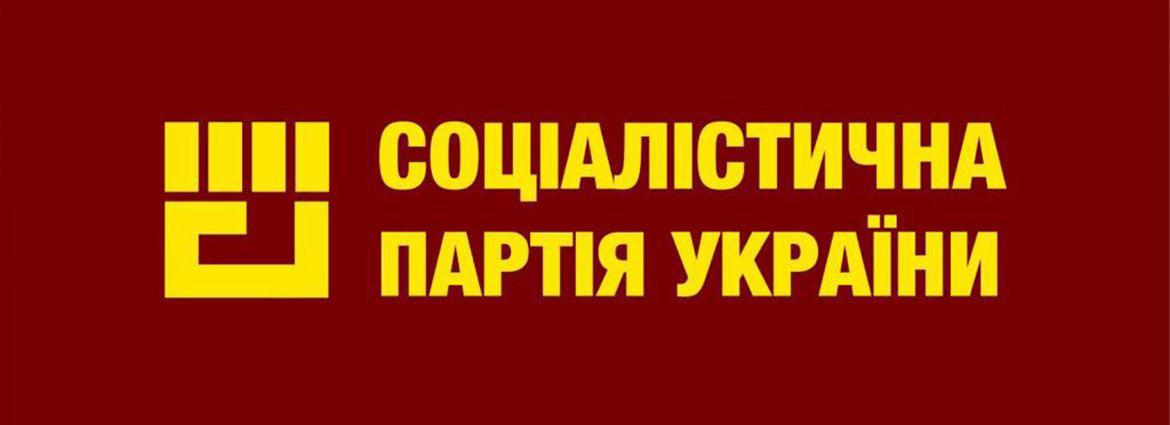
- Abbreviation: SPU
- Leader: Viktor Zaika
- Founder: Oleksandr Moroz
- Founded: 26 October 1991 (35 years, 23 days)
- Banned: 15 June 2022 (4 years, 156 days)
- Preceded by: Communist Party of Ukraine (Soviet Union)
- Newspaper: Tovarysh
- Ideology: Social democracy; Democratic socialism; Pro-Europeanism (until 2007); Euroscepticism (from 2007)
- Political position: Centre-left to left-wing
- International affiliation: Socialist International (2003–2011)
- Colours: Dark red
- Slogan: Socialism will be imbued with patriotism There is no alternative to democratic socialism in Ukraine

Party flag
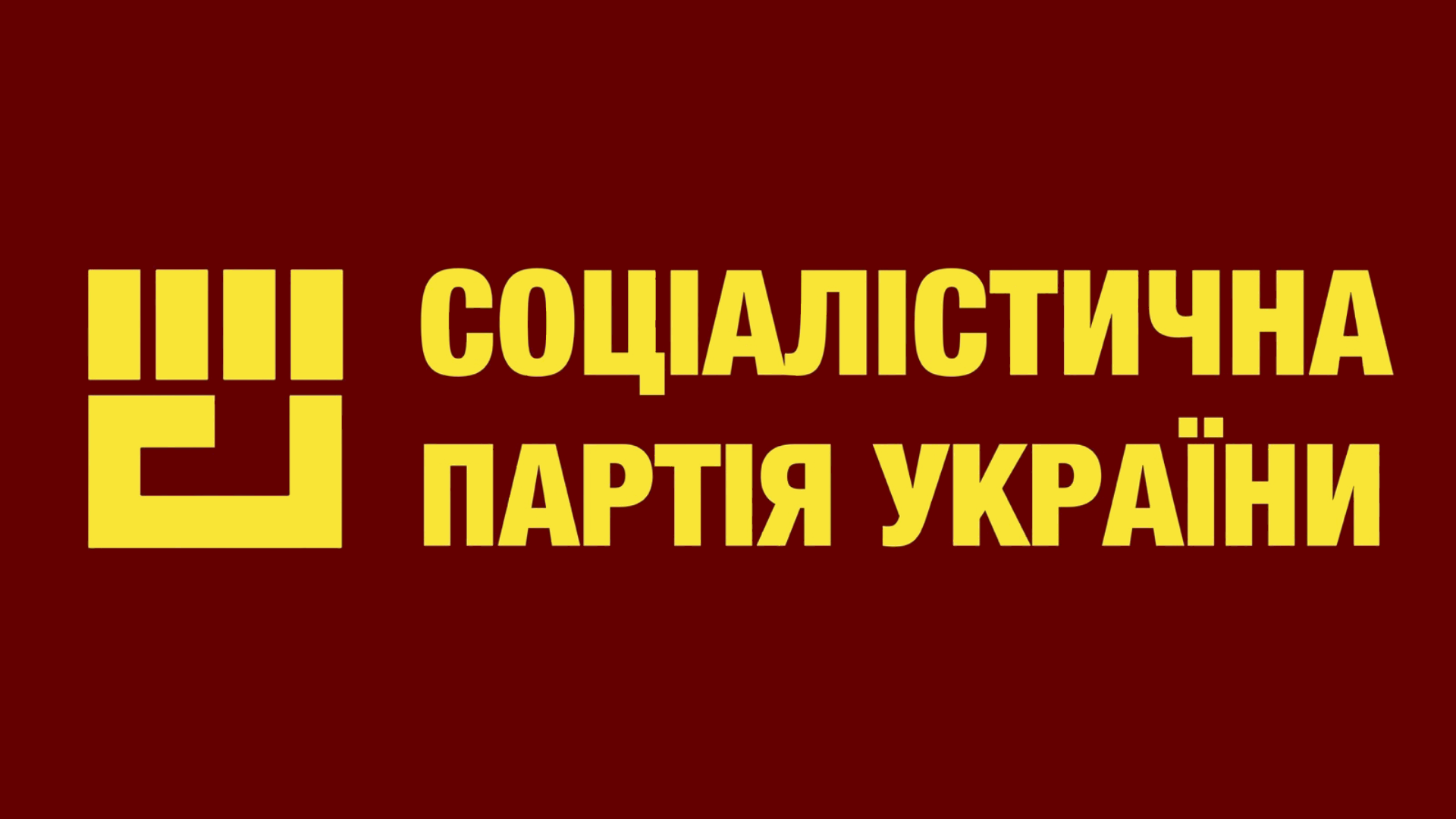

The Socialist Party of Ukraine (Ukrainian: Соціалістична партія України, romanized: Sotsialistychna partiia Ukrainy, abbreviated SPU) was a social democratic and democratic socialist political party in Ukraine. It was one of the oldest parties in Ukraine and was created by former members of the Soviet-era Communist Party of Ukraine in late 1991, when the Communist Party was banned.

Involved in a number of popular protest movements in the early 2000s, it was third and fourth largest party in parliament during its time in parliament. The party entered government for the first time as part of a coalition with Our Ukraine and the Yulia Tymoshenko Bloc in 2005, but its decision to form a government with the opposing Party of Regions and the re-founded Communist Party of Ukraine in 2006 caused significant damage to the party's credibility. Despite historically strong support in the central regions of Ukraine, it failed to pass the 3% threshold to enter parliament in the 2007 parliamentary elections. From then onwards, the party's electoral results became increasingly marginal and it failed to win any seats in subsequent elections.

The party's founder, Oleksandr Moroz, was elected Chairman of the Verkhovna Rada, Ukraine's parliament, in 1994 and played a key role in the adoption of the Constitution of Ukraine. He led the party for more than 20 years until his resignation in 2012, after which the party became embroiled in a long-lasting leadership struggle. In 2017, the party was taken over by a former member of the far-right Right Sector, Illia Kyva. It participated in the 2019 presidential and parliamentary elections without any success.

The party was suspended in the wake of the Russian invasion of Ukraine and banned by a court decision on 15 June 2022.

== History ==
=== Creation ===
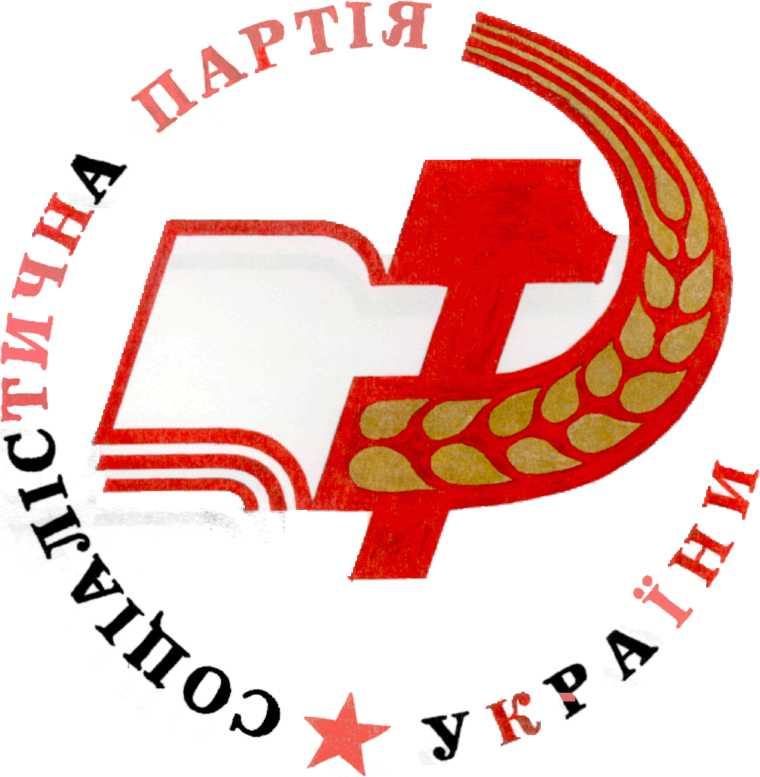
First logo of the SPU

Following Ukraine's independence on 24 August 1991, Leonid Kravchuk as the Chairman of the Verkhovna Rada (Ukraine's parliament) signed several important documents among which was the disbandment (26 August) and later the prohibition (30 August) of communist parties. This led to the collapse of the communist-majority faction, informally known as the "group of 239", led by Oleksandr Moroz. Four days after the prohibition of communist parties, Moroz called on communists to unite in a new left-wing party. The founding congress of the party was held in Kyiv on 26 October 1991 and Moroz was elected leader. The party's programme, approved at a second congress held in November 1992, emphasised the party's status as the successor to the Communist Party of Ukraine and proclaimed the party's goal of achieving socialism through "people's democracy".

=== 1990s ===
In 1993, the party experienced a mass exodus of members when the Communist Party of Ukraine (KPU), which claimed to be the direct successor of the Soviet-era Communist Party, was formed in June. The situation was so severe that several of the party's regional organisations had ceased to exist and the continued existence of the party was put into question at an extraordinary congress, but those who supported merging into the Communist Party remained in the minority. In total, some 40,000 members, or half the party's membership, left for the refounded KPU.

In December 1993, the party entered the opposition to the administration of prime minister Leonid Kuchma and president Leonid Kravchuk, but by this point Kuchma had already resigned as prime minister.

In March 1994, the party participated in the country's first parliamentary election since independence and won 14 seats, becoming the fourth-largest party in the Verkhovna Rada behind the Communist Party, People's Movement of Ukraine (Rukh), and the Peasant Party of Ukraine (SelPU). By mid-1994, the party controlled a parliamentary faction of 25 deputies, as deputies from other parties, especially those from the Peasant Party of Ukraine (SelPU) opted to sit with the Socialists, and Moroz was elected Chairman of the Verkhovna Rada (speaker of parliament) with the support of Communist deputies.

In the 1994 presidential election held in June, Moroz was the sole left-wing candidate and received the support of both the Communist Party, and the Peasant Party, but garnered just 13.3% of the vote and failed to advance past the first round of voting. Moroz himself did not endorse either Kravchuk or Kuchma in the second round, and the party's central leadership left the decision of who to endorse for the presidency to individual branches. Most followed the Communist Party in supporting Kuchma, the eventual winner. During the election, Moroz campaigned for transforming Ukraine into a parliamentary republic, prohibiting the sale of land, and a "state-regulated market".

Over the course of Moroz's term as chairman, relations between himself and Kuchma became increasingly strained. The duo notably clashed on the issue of constitutional reform; Kuchma favoured increasing the power of the presidency and transforming Ukraine into a unitary state, while Moroz and the left-wing in parliament sought to empower parliament and advocated decentralisation. The adoption of a temporary, mini constitution in June 1995 did not ease tensions, and Moroz repeatedly rebuffed efforts to pass "pro-presidential" drafts of a basic law. The semi-presidential republican constitution, a compromise, was eventually adopted by parliament with the necessary two-thirds majority in June 1996.

In February 1996, Nataliya Vitrenko was expelled from the party over disputes with Moroz and the rest of the leadership concerning the party's political programme which she believed deviated from socialist ideals. She and Volodymyr Marchenko, who was also expelled from the party, founded the Progressive Socialist Party of Ukraine a month later in April 1996.

In the run up to the 1998 parliamentary election, attempts to form a coalition with the Communist Party had failed and the party instead contested alongside the Peasant Party of Ukraine in an electoral alliance called For Truth, For the People, For Ukraine (Za pravdu, za narod, za Ukrainu), later known as Left Center. The bloc managed to secure 8.55% of the votes, 29 proportional seats, and 5 constituencies out of 450 in the Verkhovna Rada. The bloc gained the position of Chairman of the Verkhovna Rada (speaker of parliament) when Peasant Party chairman Oleksandr Tkachenko was elected to the post. The Peasant Party later started its own parliamentary faction with 15 deputies in the autumn of 1998 but disbanded in 2000 as many of the Peasant Party's deputies followed their faction leader Serhii Dovhan into the newly formed pro-presidential Solidarity led by Petro Poroshenko.

For the 1999 Ukrainian presidential election, Moroz was a member of the "Kaniv Four", an alliance of presidential hopefuls that included former Prime Minister of Ukraine Yevhen Marchuk, Mayor of Cherkasy Volodymyr Oliynyk, and the Peasant Party's Oleksandr Tkachenko. The four agreed to support Marchuk as the joint candidate after protracted negotiations, but the alliance fell apart when Moroz abruptly announced his decision to stand for election.

Despite being considered the most likely candidate to defeat Kuchma, Moroz failed to advance past the first round of voting, having come third with only 11.29% of the vote. Plagued by allegations of electoral fraud, Kuchma also faced accusations of having funded the Progressive Socialist Party in order split the left-wing vote.

=== 2000s ===
During the 2000s, the party was member to a series of protests and conflicts in opposition to the presidency of Kuchma and pro-Kuchma parties. It opposed the 2000 Ukrainian constitutional referendum called by Kuchma with the intention of expanding the powers of the presidency and decreasing that of the Ukrainian parliament. While the amendments were approved by voters, their implementation was obstructed when Kuchma was implicated in the Cassette Scandal, also known as Kuchmagate. Moroz publicly accused Kuchma of being involved in the disappearance and murder of journalist Georgiy Gongadze, who had been found decapitated in Kyiv. He played select recordings that supposedly proved Kuchma ordered the abduction of Gongadze to journalists using a cassette player, which earned the scandal its name.

The resultant Ukraine without Kuchma (UBK) protest campaign ended when it was violently dispersed by the Militsiya, the national police force, in March 2001. One of the party's members who gained national prominence as a result of his involvement in the protests, Yuriy Lutsenko, would later become the minister of internal affairs under the government of Yulia Tymoshenko as well as Prosecutor General of Ukraine.

Separately, a group of former party members consisting of Ivan Chizh, Serhii Kiyashko, Mykola Lavrynenko, and Vasyl Aresto, founded the splinter All-Ukrainian Union of Leftists "Justice" in April 2000. As members of the Socialist Platform, they had been expelled for their opposition to Moroz's reforms within the party.

During the election campaign for the 2002 Ukrainian parliamentary election, opposition parties and candidates were afforded little media access, and the party's youth wing endorsed the Social Democratic Party of Ukraine (united), a member of the pro-Kuchma alliance led by Viktor Medvedchuk. Nevertheless, the party managed to secure 6.9% of the popular vote, and 20 proportional seats seats, and 3 constituencies. The Union of Young Socialists was founded as the party's new youth organisation the same year and led by Oleksandr Starynets, a former first secretary of Komsomol of Ukraine. The party was a participant in the Rise up, Ukraine! protests which called for early presidential elections.

The party was a participant in the Orange Revolution in 2004, a series of protests sparked by the fraudulent results of the 2004 Ukrainian presidential election. Moroz had been the party's candidate but shifted his support to Viktor Yushchenko after garnering just 5.82% of the vote in the first round. The election's initial result, which gave the victory to Kuchma-supported Viktor Yanukovych was contested by international observers. Yushchenko was declared the winner of the re-run, and Yanukovych resigned as prime minister to allow for the appointment of a new coalition government led by Yulia Tymoshenko, which counted the Socialist Party alongside Our Ukraine, the Yulia Tymoshenko Bloc, and the Party of Industrialists and Entrepreneurs of Ukraine. The government's inauguration was the first time the party held power as part of the executive branch of the central government. It received three ministerial portfolios, with Stanislav Nikolaenko assuming the position of Minister of Education and Science, Yuriy Lutsenko as Minister of Internal Affairs, and Oleksandr Baranivsky as Minister of Agrarian Affairs. The coalition was replicated at the regional level, with the party gaining the position of chairman of the regional state administration in two oblasts, as well as the appointment of Valentyna Semenyuk-Samsonenko as director of the State Property Fund of Ukraine. The party retained its position in the succeeding Yekhanurov government, which had come to power in the aftermath of a power struggle between the head of the National Security and Defense Council Petro Poroshenko and Tymoshenko, who was dismissed as prime minister as a result.

In 2005, the Ukrainian Party of Justice - Union of veterans, handicapped, Chornobyl liquidators, and Afghan warriors merged into the Socialist Party.

The party and Moroz played a key role in the 2006 Ukrainian political crisis. Negotiations to re-form an "orange" coalition after the March 2006 Ukrainian parliamentary election between the Socialist Party, Our Ukraine, and the Yulia Tymoshenko Bloc were complicated by mutual distrust and disputes over the allocation of positions in government; Moroz supported Tymoshenko's claim to the premiership, and she in turn supported Moroz's candidacy as chairman of the Verkhovna Rada, but Tymoshenko herself was unpopular among Socialist Party members, while Our Ukraine held counter negotiations with Yanukovych's Party of Regions. Three months of negotiations seemed to close to an end after Moroz announced he would no longer seek the chairmanship and promised to support Our Ukraine's presumptive candidate, Yury Yekhanurov, paving the way for the coalition's confirmation on 21 June. However, when Petro Poroshenko was revealed as Our Ukraine's candidate, Moroz submitted his own candidacy and was elected with the support of deputies from the Socialist Party, Party of Regions, and the Communist Party, which formed the basis for the creation of the Anti-Crisis Coalition. Moroz would justify the turnabout by claiming Our Ukraine had intentionally engineered the coalition's breakup by nominating a candidate it knew the party couldn't accept, and had planned to use that as their justification for entering into an alliance with the Party of Regions.

A map showing the party's vote share in each region in the 2006 parliamentary elections

A map showing the party's vote share in each region in the 2007 parliamentary elections

The party's decision to walk back on its agreement with its erstwhile "orange" allies proved controversial and had a lasting impact on the party's image, as it was now seen as traitorous and corrupt. High-ranking members including then-minister for interior affairs Yuriy Lutsenko, who would go on to lead Yuriy Lutsenko's People's Self-Defense, party first secretary Yosip Vinsky, who would go on to join Tymoshenko's Batkivshchyna, as well as Halyna Garmash, a member of the party's political council, all resigned from the party in its immediate aftermath. Furthermore, a study conducted by the Gorenshin Institute in November 2006 showed that the party had lost much of its support in its traditional heartland in central Ukraine. When a power struggle between Yanukovych and Yushchenko led to the 2007 Ukrainian political crisis and a snap election in September the same year, the party's vote share collapsed. It received just 2.86% of the national vote, 0.14% short of the minimum 3% threshold for entry into parliament.

Much of the criticism for the poor electoral result within the party was directed against Yaroslav Mendus, who was in charge of the party's campaign during the election, and the party's "grey cardinals". Others in the leadership such as Valentina-Semenyuk and Mykhailo Melnychuk were similarly targeted. Their critics included well-known members of the party such as Volodymyr Boyko, a red director and a major financial contributor to the party, youth leader Yevhen Filindash, and former ministers Stanislav Nikolaenko, and Oleksandr Baranivsky. However, no changes were ultimately made to the composition of the party's leadership in that year's congress.

Continued dissension within the party culminated in the expulsion of Nikolaenko and Baranivsky, who alongside Mykola Sadovy, were branded "schismatics" by Moroz. Both Nikolaenko and Baranivsky had previously put forward a programme to reform the party at a congress in April 2008, advocating the introduction of a two-term limit for both the party's leader and head of the central control commission, the party's disciplinary body. They also proposed introducing secret ballots for elections, purportedly with the aim of removing Moroz from the leadership. The two would go on to join the splinter "Justice" party along with some 300 members in March 2009. Other critical figures such as Yevhen Filindash left the party in April 2008. Mykola Sadovy was handed a reprimand.

In a press conference in November 2009, Moroz stated he had no regrets about joining the Anti-Crisis Coalition, saying: "I'm not ashamed but proud of the fact that I managed to halt the crisis of power. The economy operated normal and, the parliament adopted 80% of the laws [it considered] by a constitutional majority of votes. We were close to the decentralization of power. That's why Tymoshenko and Yushchenko's supporters forced the president to dismiss the parliament and remove me and my political forces illegally".

=== 2010s ===
The party nominated Moroz as their candidate in the 2010 Ukrainian presidential election, and garnered just 0.4% of the vote. The election was eventually won by Viktor Yanukovych. Moroz stepped down as leader in July 2010 and was replaced by Vasyl Tsushko, the incumbent minister for the economy in the Azarov government. Moroz was made the party's honorary leader. The other candidates included Mykola Rudkovsky, one of the party's financers holding the position of first secretary of the political council, Viktor Subotin, the general manager of Turboatom, and Valentina-Semenyuk. The party's electoral misfortunes continued in that year's local elections, where just 38 councilors from the party were elected across 11 oblasts and three city councils. It performed the best in the Chernihiv and Poltava Oblasts where the party won 11% and 5.8% of the votes respectively.

Tsushko himself resigned as leader in July 2011, citing the difficulty of combining his position in government as head of the Anti-Monopoly Committee with party responsibilities. Sources within the party claimed the true reason was Tsushko's deteriorating health. In the leadership election held afterward, Moroz, who ran on a platform of bringing the party into opposition to the Azarov government, managed to defeat Rudkovsky, who was alleged to have the backing of the ruling Party of Regions.

That same month, the party was reported to have been expelled from the Socialist International for failing to comply with "the fundamental values and principles of the International". However, the minutes of the meeting where the decision was undertaken showed that the party had been expelled "due to not being actively engaged in SI activities, having no representation, or not having paid membership fees for some time".

Rudkovsky left the party in December 2011 after a planned merger of 11 left-wing parties failed, accusing Moroz of sabotaging the unification process to maintain his cult of personality. The party had been member to an agreement announced in November that year which would have seen ten other left-wing parties merge into the Socialist Party, whereupon it would adopt a new name. This plan fell apart when the party's political council refused to ratify the merger agreement and demanded the other parties merge into the Socialist Party without any conditions. Only five parties agreed to do so; the Peasant Party of Ukraine, Socialist Ukraine, Children of War, "Children of War" People's Party of Ukraine, and Cossack Glory, while the remaining five parties opted to merge and form the United Left and Peasants. In January 2012, the Ministry of Justice declared the merger between the Peasant Party and the Socialist Party illegal.

Rumours that Moroz would resign as leader amid reports of his deteriorating health appeared in April 2012 ahead of that year's party congress. Petro Ustenko was elected the party's leader after being nominated by Moroz, winning 267 votes out of 342. He previously served as the party's first deputy chairman responsible organisational work as well as head of the party's election headquarters. In the 2012 Ukrainian parliamentary election, the party failed to win any representation. It garnered just 0.46% of the party list vote and failed to win in any of the 58 constituencies it contested in.

The party's poor performance in the parliamentary elections as well as Ustenko's failure to secure the party's finances culminated in a crisis in 2013. That year's congress was postponed from July to October, as Rudkovsky was readmitted after winning a seat in parliament as a self-nominated candidate in 2012. He reportedly held several meetings with members where he promised to provide funding for the party. At this point, Rudkovsky was a member of the Party of Regions' parliamentary faction. Sources close to the party described the situation as an "internal struggle" between Moroz and Rudkovsky.

The resultant congress adopted a new party statute and created two new positions; leader, which would be held by Ustenko, responsible for the party's organisation, and chairman, by Rudkovsky, who would be responsible for the party's political direction. Valentina-Semenyuk was touted as a possible contender for the leadership but withdrew when nominated, as did Moroz. Political scientist Andrey Zolotarev considered Rudkovsky's election to be part of a plan by the ruling Party of Regions to weaken the popular support of its erstwhile Communist ally.

In the aftermath of the Euromaidan and Revolution of Dignity, which saw the overthrow of Yanukovych and the dismissal of the Party of Regions-led government, acting president Oleksandr Turchynov ordered the Ministry of Justice to open investigations against the Communist Party for "anti-state activities" in May 2014, putting its continued existence into doubt. The Socialist Party, being the country's oldest left-wing party, found itself in a position where it was likely to inherit a sizable portion of the Communist electorate in the upcoming 2014 Ukrainian parliamentary election, increasing its political and monetary value immensely. In that context, a congress was held on 21 June where the decision was made by a majority of delegates present to return to the party's previous statute, whereupon Rudkovsky was elected the party's sole leader. Ustenko contested the legitimacy of the congress and its results, hiring a security firm to raid the party's offices, resulting in a protracted legal battle. Both Ustenko and Rudkovsky accused each other of intending to sell off the party.

The State Register's refusal to register the results of the party's congress left it unable to participate in the 2014 Ukrainian parliamentary election and 2015 Ukrainian local elections.

Citing "unsatisfactory health", Rudkovsky stepped down as leader and fled the country in 2015. He was replaced by Mykola Sadovy at the second stage of the twentieth congress held in August.

In June 2017, the Administrative Court of Cassation confirmed the Kyiv District Administrative Court's 2015 decision that the results of the 2014 congress were to be implemented in full and that the State Register's refusal to do so was illegal.

Adopted in 2006, this logo continued to be used by Sadovy's faction until the party was banned in 2022.

In July 2017, Illia Kyva announced that he had been elected as the party's chairman on his Facebook page. The former leader of the far-right political party Right Sector in eastern Ukraine, Kyva's election was described by Moroz as an attempt by Ustenko's faction to nullify the administrative court of cassation's decision. Ivan Bokyi, a former chairman of the party's parliamentary faction, described Kyva's election as a government-linked raid against the party. Ustenko later admitted that Kyva's election was part of an agreement with internal minister Arsen Avakov, to whom Kyva was an advisor; he was to help the party prepare for future presidential and parliamentary elections.

The same month, the State Register was updated and listed Kyva as the party's chairman and Ustenko the leader.

In response to Kyva's election, Sadovy's faction opted to elect Serhiy Kaplin as their leader. Kaplin was a people's deputy linked to Avakov's rival, politician and oligarch Serhiy Lyovochkin. This faction subsequently agreed to enter into a coalition with Kaplin's Social Democratic Party (SDP) as well as the Party of Pensioners for upcoming elections.

In January 2018, Ustenko and his faction's members were removed from the State Register. Ustenko accused Kyva of being responsible and announced his expulsion from the party. In an appearance on Espreso TV, a Ukrainian news organisation owned by Avakov's wife Inna Avakova, Kyva denied reports of his expulsion and alleged that Ustenko had been in contact with individuals linked to Russian president Vladimir Putin and Russian organised crime to negotiate funding for the party, further claiming that they had been expelled from the party the previous month as a result. In response, Ustenko launched a lawsuit to nullify the changes made to the State Register.

In March 2018, Kyva's faction approved a new programme where it adopted an outwardly pro-European Atlanticist attitude, advocating for the Ukrainian membership in the European Union and NATO. It also adopted a new logo, a yellow fist on a crimson background, and nominated Kyva as its candidate for the 2019 Ukrainian presidential election. He won just 0.03% of the vote and was replaced as the party's leader by Serhiy Cherednychenko. This faction nominated candidates for two constituencies in the 2019 Ukrainian parliamentary election, Cherednychenko in the 144th district and pro-Russian oligarch Oleksandr Onyshchenko in the 93rd district. It also co-operated with the pro-Russian Opposition Platform — For Life, with Kyva being elected as a member of its closed list.

In January 2019, Kaplin's election as chairman of the Sadovy faction was nullified, and the party opted to support Moroz's candidacy in the presidential election instead. However, Moroz withdrew from the race four days before the first round of voting.

=== Russian invasion and banning ===
On 24 February 2022, Russia launched an invasion into Ukraine. On 6 March, Kyva was charged with high treason after making a number of statements justifying the invasion and blaming it on Ukrainian president Volodymyr Zelenskyy. He had fled to Russia a month prior to the invasion. The SPU was one of several political parties suspended by the National Security and Defense Council of Ukraine as a result of the invasion, along with Derzhava, Left Opposition, Nashi, Opposition Bloc, Opposition Platform — For Life, Party of Shariy, Progressive Socialist Party of Ukraine, Union of Leftists, and the Volodymyr Saldo Bloc.

On 15 June 2022, the Eighth Administrative Court of Appeal banned the party and all of its property was transferred to the state. Vikor Zaika, who was also the director of the Illia Kyva Charitable Foundation "Liberation", was the party's official leader at its banning. The Security Service of Ukraine and Ministry of Justice cited the party's alleged anti-Ukrainian and pro-Russian activities, statements of its previous leaders, as well as Kyva's continued influence over the party as its justifications. On 18 October 2022, the final appeal against the party's ban lodged by Sadovy's faction was dismissed by the Supreme Court of Ukraine.

== Ideological development ==
While the party was founded at the initiative of reformists within the Soviet-era Communist Party of Ukraine, the rank-and-file membership who answered the appeal for the formation of a new left-wing party were significantly more radical than its leadership and many who had participated in the party's founding had sought to recreate the banned Communist Party under a new name. This had a significant impact on the party's early positions; while it adopted a compromise on the national question, positioning itself as a supporter of Ukrainian statehood, but one based on the equality of all individuals regardless of nationality, and advocated for unity with former Soviet republics, it fiercely opposed any and all reforms to the country's economic system, with Moroz decrying the "unprecedented, uncontrolled profiteering of Western monopolies in the economical and spiritual space of Ukraine". It also adopted the view that the dissolution of the Soviet Union was caused by the failure of the state-bureaucratic system rather than the result of a crisis of socialism.

The party's poor performance in the 1994 parliamentary elections, where it won fewer seats than the refounded Communist Party, as well as Moroz's election as parliamentary chairman, which necessitated compromise with the executive, provided the some impetus for the party to begin adopting a more moderate position. In a post-election congress held in April 1994, Moroz publicly complained about the attitude of some of the party's membership, who had tried to "transfer the party organisation over to the Communists" upon its refoundation in 1993. Instead, he argued that with the party free of its defectors—some 40,000 party members had left for the Communist Party in between 1993 and 1994—it could now adopt a more centrist approach. The party's leadership thus adopted a less antagonistic attitude towards the government's reform programme and accepted the principle of private ownership, if only for the service and retail trade industry. Moroz's supporters also began to talk of emulating the Democratic Left Alliance of Poland, whose electoral success in the 1993 Polish parliamentary election allowed it to form a coalition government; that following the "Polish route", the party should build a broad coalition of left-wing parties with democratic and progressive-patriotic forces.

During this time, the party also attempted to affirm its Ukrainian character by claiming the legacy of non-Soviet socialists such as Mykhailo Drahomanov and Volodymyr Vynnychenko, as well as early nationalist figures within the Ukrainian SSR, such as Vasyl Shahkrai, Mykola Skrypnyk, Christian Rakovsky, and Alexander Shumsky.

The party's right-ward shift resulted in a split in 1995, when the head of the party's theoretical council and author of its political programme, Natalia Vitrenko, was expelled from the party's faction in parliament, and finally expelled from the party proper alongside Volodomyr Marchenko in 1996. With the possibility of another large-scale defection, as much of the party's rank-and-file's sympathies laid with the rebels, a special congress in February 1996 reverted to a more hardline stance. However, the party's move toward the centre was renewed with the adoption of a "New Course" in its June 1998 congress, held in the aftermath of that year's parliamentary elections, where the party won just 34 seats compared to the Communists' 124. Moroz opened the party to other social and political movements and deemphasised Marxism-Leninism as the party's theoretical base, while abandoning ideas such as the dictatorship of the proletariat and class struggle entirely. The party further sought to broaden its appeal to include the emerging middle class and "honest" industrialist. While the congress had been compared to the Social Democratic Party of Germany's 1959 Godesberg Congress, the changes it introduced were more analogous to Robert Hue's modernisation of the French Communist Party, from which Moroz took inspiration.

The adoption of an explicitly democratic socialist programme at the party's May 2000 congress was preceded by another two waves of expulsions in December 1999 and February 2000 of members of the Socialist Platform. The document, which classified the party as centre-left, consisted of a minimum programme, which called for the elimination of the oligarchic clan system and establishment of a transitionary government, and a maximum programme, which called for the establishment of democratic socialism in Ukraine. The party also advocated European integration as well as Ukrainian membership in the Commonwealth of Independent States, but opposed membership in NATO and its expansion into Eastern Europe.

In its 2006 pre-election programme "We will build Europe in Ukraine", the party promoted itself as a European social democratic party and proposed a referendum on Ukrainian membership in NATO. In contrast, its 2007 pre-election programme lacked the previous year's social democratic character, did not mention NATO, and advocated closer relations with both the European Union and Russia.

== Election results ==
Verkhovna Rada
Year	Party-list			Constituency /total	Overall seats won	Seat change	Government
Year	Popular vote	%	Seats /total	Constituency /total	Overall seats won	Seat change	Government
1994	895,830	3.3%	—N/a	14/338	14 / 450	▲14	Minority support
1998	For Truth, for People, for Ukraine	8.8%	14/225	3/220	17 / 450	▲3	Opposition
2002	1,780,642	7.1%	20/225	2/225	22 / 450	▲5	Opposition
2006	1,444,224	5.7%	33/450	—N/a	33 / 450	▲11	Coalition government
2007	668,234	2.9%	0/450	—N/a	0 / 450	▼33	Extra-parliamentary
2012	93,081	0.5%	0/225	0/220	0 / 450	Steady	Extra-parliamentary
2014	Did not participate		0/225	0/198	0 / 450	Steady	Extra-parliamentary
2019	1,990	0.0%	0/225	0/199	0 / 450	Steady	Extra-parliamentary

Presidency of Ukraine
Election year	Candidate	First round		Place	Second round	
Election year	Candidate	No. of overall votes	% of overall vote	Place	No. of overall votes	% of overall vote
1994	Oleksandr Moroz	3,466,541	13.3	3		
1999	Oleksandr Moroz	2,969,896	11.8	3		
2004	Oleksandr Moroz	1,632,098	5.8	3		
2010	Oleksandr Moroz	95,169	0.4	11		
2014	Olha Bohomolets (endorsed by the SPU)	345,384	1.9	8		
2019	Illia Kyva	5,869	0.3	29		

== See also ==
- Communist Party of Ukraine
- Communist Party of Ukraine (Soviet Union)
- List of political parties in Ukraine
- Politics of Ukraine
