= Valentyna Semenyuk-Samsonenko =

Ukrainian politician

- Валентина Петрівна Семенюк-Самсоненко
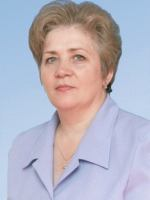
- Semenyuk-Samsonenko in 2006

Chairman of the State Property Fund of Ukraine
- In office April 2005 – December 2008

People's Deputy of Ukraine

2nd convocation
- In office 11 May 1994 – 12 May 1998
- Constituency: Communist Party of Ukraine, Zhytomyr Oblast, District No.159

3rd convocation
- In office 12 May 1998 – 14 May 2002
- Constituency: Socialist Party of Ukraine, No.33

4th convocation
- In office 14 May 2002 – 8 July 2005
- Constituency: Socialist Party of Ukraine, No.4

7th convocation
- In office 25 May 2006 – 12 September 2006
- Constituency: Socialist Party of Ukraine, No.2

Valentyna Petrivna Semenyuk-Samsonenko (Ukrainian: Валентина Петрівна Семенюк-Самсоненко; 4 June 1957 – 27 August 2014) was a Ukrainian politician. She was a People's Deputy of Ukraine of the Verkhovna Rada from 1994 to 2006. She also served as Chairman of the State Property Fund of Ukraine from 2005 to 2008. In August 2014, Semenyuk-Samsonenko committed suicide, although the National Police of Ukraine would investigate her death on suspicion of murder until proceedings closed in April 2017.

== Early life ==
She was born on 4 June 1957 in Zarichchia, which was part of the Ruzhyn Raion in the Ukrainian SSR at the time of her birth. In 1974, she started working as a clerk and deputy of the Ruzhyn village council of people's deputies and headed the drama circle for culture in Ruzhyn. In 1977, after marrying, Semenyuk switched to doing Komsomol work.

In 1982, she graduated from the Zhytomyr National Agroecological University with a degree as an economist organizer of agricultural production. She then became a senior accountant of the centralized accounting department of the Department of Agriculture and a senior economist of the Ruzhyn district planning commission. In 1990, she became secretary of the Ruzhyn District Committee of the Communist Party of Ukraine, which she did until the Communist Party's ban in 1991 and so she worked as a senior economist of the district plan and head of the socio-economic department of Ruzhyn.

== Personal life ==
Semenyuk-Samsonenko was married to businessman Vitaly Samsonenko from 2008 to 2012. Her first husband was Anatoliy Semenyuk, the couple raised two daughters. Anatoliy Semenyuk died in 1995.

=== Death ===
The body of Semenyuk-Samsonenko was found with a firearm wound to the head on 27 August 2014 at 19:00 local time in the suburb of Kyiv village of Chaiky (Kyiv-Sviatoshyn Raion). The body was discovered by Semenyuk's daughter. The official cause of death was suicide. Police closed criminal proceedings over the death in April 2017.

Political offices
| Preceded by Mykhailo Chechetov | Director of State Property Fund of Ukraine; 2005–2008 | Succeeded by Dmytro Parfenenko (acting) |
