= Oleksandr Moroz =

Ukrainian politician (born 1944)

- Олександр Мороз
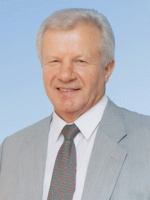
- Official portrait, 2006

Chairman of the Verkhovna Rada
- In office 6 July 2006 – 4 December 2007
- President: Viktor Yushchenko
- Preceded by: Volodymyr Lytvyn
- Succeeded by: Arseniy Yatsenyuk
- In office 18 May 1994 – 7 July 1998
- President: Leonid Kravchuk; Leonid Kuchma
- Preceded by: Ivan Plyushch
- Succeeded by: Oleksandr Tkachenko

People's Deputy of Ukraine
- In office 15 May 1990 – 23 November 2007
- Constituency: Communist Party of Ukraine, Kyiv Oblast, District No.224 (1990–1994); Socialist Party of Ukraine, Kyiv Oblast, No.223 (1994–1998); Socialist Party of Ukraine, Kyiv Oblast, No.92 (1998–2002); Socialist Party of Ukraine, No.1 (2002–2007)

Personal details
- Born: 29 February 1944 (age 82) Buda, Tarashcha Raion, Kyiv Oblast, Ukrainian SSR, USSR
- Party: Socialist Party of Ukraine (1991–2016); Socialist Party of Oleksandr Moroz (since 2016)
- Other political affiliations: Communist Party of Ukraine (1972–1991)
- Spouse: Valentyna Andriyivna (née Lavrynenko)
- Children: 2
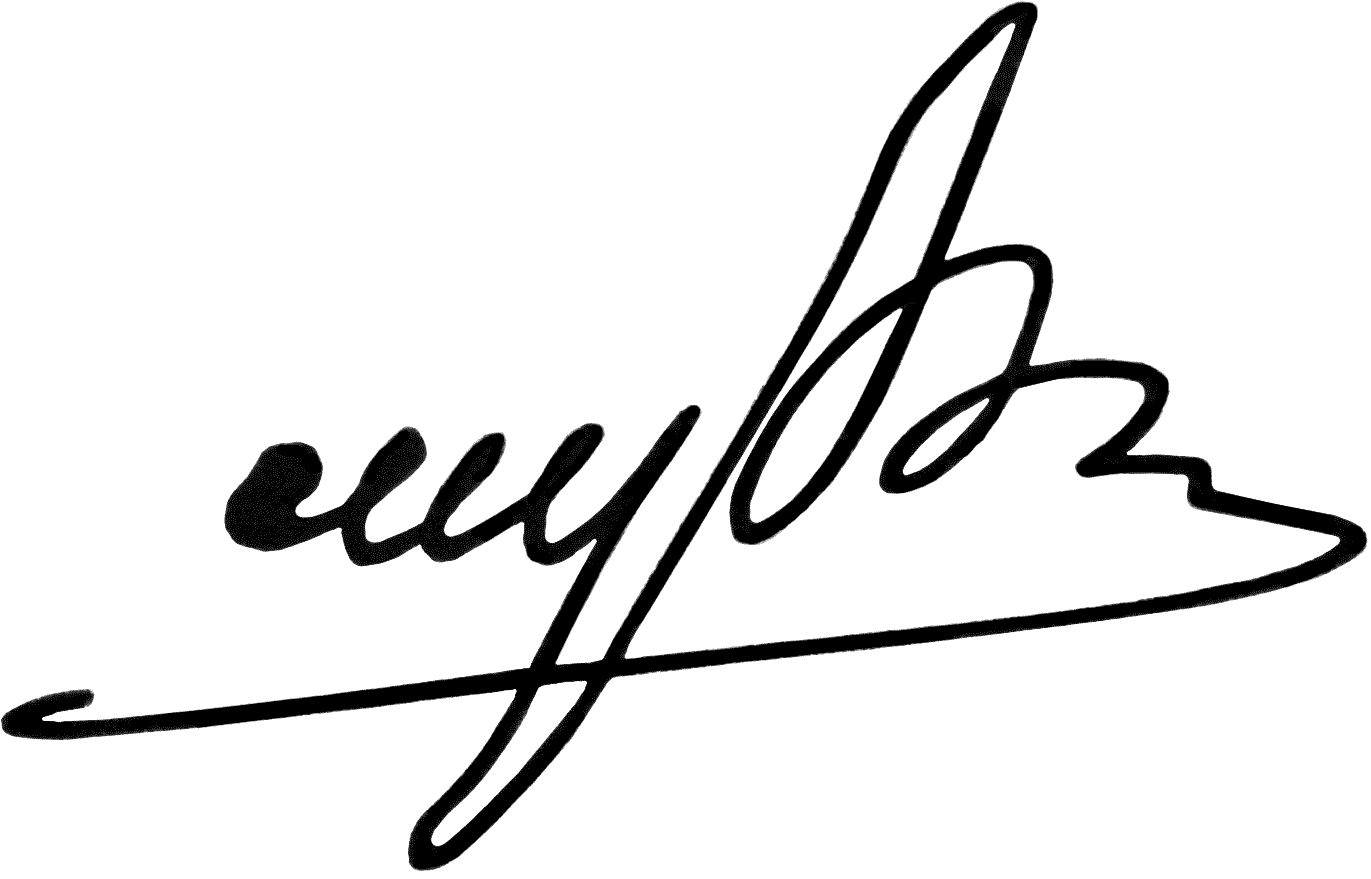
- Signature
- Website: http://www.spu.in.ua/leader.php

Oleksandr Oleksandrovych Moroz (Note: Ukrainian: Олександр Олександрович Мороз, Ukrainian pronunciation: [oɫekˈsɑndr oɫekˈsɑndrowɪt͡ʃ moˈrɔz] Russian: Александр Александрович Мороз, romanized: Aleksandr Aleksandrovich Moroz) (born 29 February 1944) is a Ukrainian politician. He was the Chairman of the Verkhovna Rada twice, from 1994 to 1998 and again from 2006 to 2007. He has stood as a candidate for President of Ukraine five times.

One of the founders and a former leader of the Socialist Party of Ukraine, formerly an influential party in Ukraine, Moroz lost parliamentary representation when the Socialist Party failed to secure a sufficient number of votes in the 2007 snap parliamentary election, falling 0.14% short of the 3% election threshold.

== Early life and career ==
Oleksandr Oleksandrovych Moroz was born on 29 February 1944 in the village of Buda, Tarashcha Raion, Kyiv Oblast, then part of the Ukrainian SSR in the Soviet Union. He graduated as a mechanical engineer from the Ukrainian Agricultural Academy in Kyiv (now National University of Life and Environmental Sciences of Ukraine).

After graduation he worked in the agricultural sector as an engineer and teacher for roughly twelve years, including at state farms and technical colleges in Zhytomyr and Kyiv regions. He began party work in 1976 in the apparatus of the Kyiv Oblast committee of the Communist Party of Ukraine, later heading the organizational/agricultural departments and holding trade-union posts at the oblast level in the 1980s; he subsequently entered national politics in 1990 as a deputy of the Supreme Soviet (later Verkhovna Rada).

He is reported to have received the Soviet Medal For Labour Valour.

== Kravchuk and Kuchma years ==
Moroz became a deputy of the Verkhovna Rada in 1990. During the August 1991 declaration of Ukrainian independence he led the Communist deputies’ faction in parliament, informally known as the “group of 239.”

On 26 October 1991 Moroz convened the founding congress of the Socialist Party of Ukraine (SPU) as a successor to the banned Soviet-era Communist Party of Ukraine and was elected its leader.

Moroz stood as the SPU’s presidential candidate in 1994 and 1999. He finished third in both contests (about 13% of the vote in 1994 and 11% in 1999). International observers reported serious problems in the 1999 campaign and media environment, and U.S. and European monitoring bodies criticized aspects of the process and administration.

As Chairman of the Verkhovna Rada (speaker) in 1994–1998, Moroz presided over the parliamentary session that adopted the Constitution of Ukraine on 28 June 1996, a document that limited earlier proposals for expanded presidential powers, and entrenched parliamentary checks.

In the 1999 campaign Moroz joined Yevhen Marchuk, Oleksandr Tkachenko and Volodymyr Oliinyk in the so-called "Kaniv Four," an effort to coordinate opposition candidates; the grouping ultimately failed to unite behind a single nominee and dissolved shortly before election day.

On 28 November 2000, Moroz publicly released recordings provided by presidential bodyguard Mykola Melnychenko that appeared to implicate senior officials, including President Leonid Kuchma, in the disappearance of journalist Georgiy Gongadze—triggering the Cassette Scandal and mass protests under the slogan “Ukraine without Kuchma.” In early 2001, opposition forces—including Socialists—formed the Forum (or National) Committee of National Salvation and organized the “Ukraine without Kuchma” protests.

Following the 2002 parliamentary election the SPU became one of the smaller left-of-centre factions in the Rada; opposition forces, including the SPU, cooperated at various times with Our Ukraine and the Yulia Tymoshenko Bloc against the presidential administration.

== Orange Revolution and election defeat ==
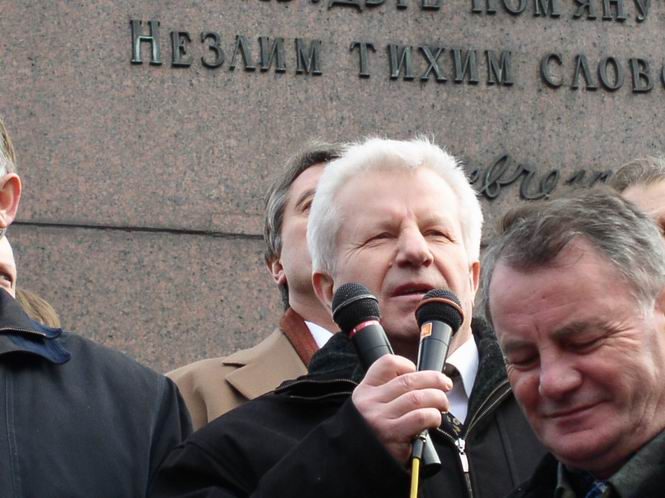
Moroz at the rally in 2003

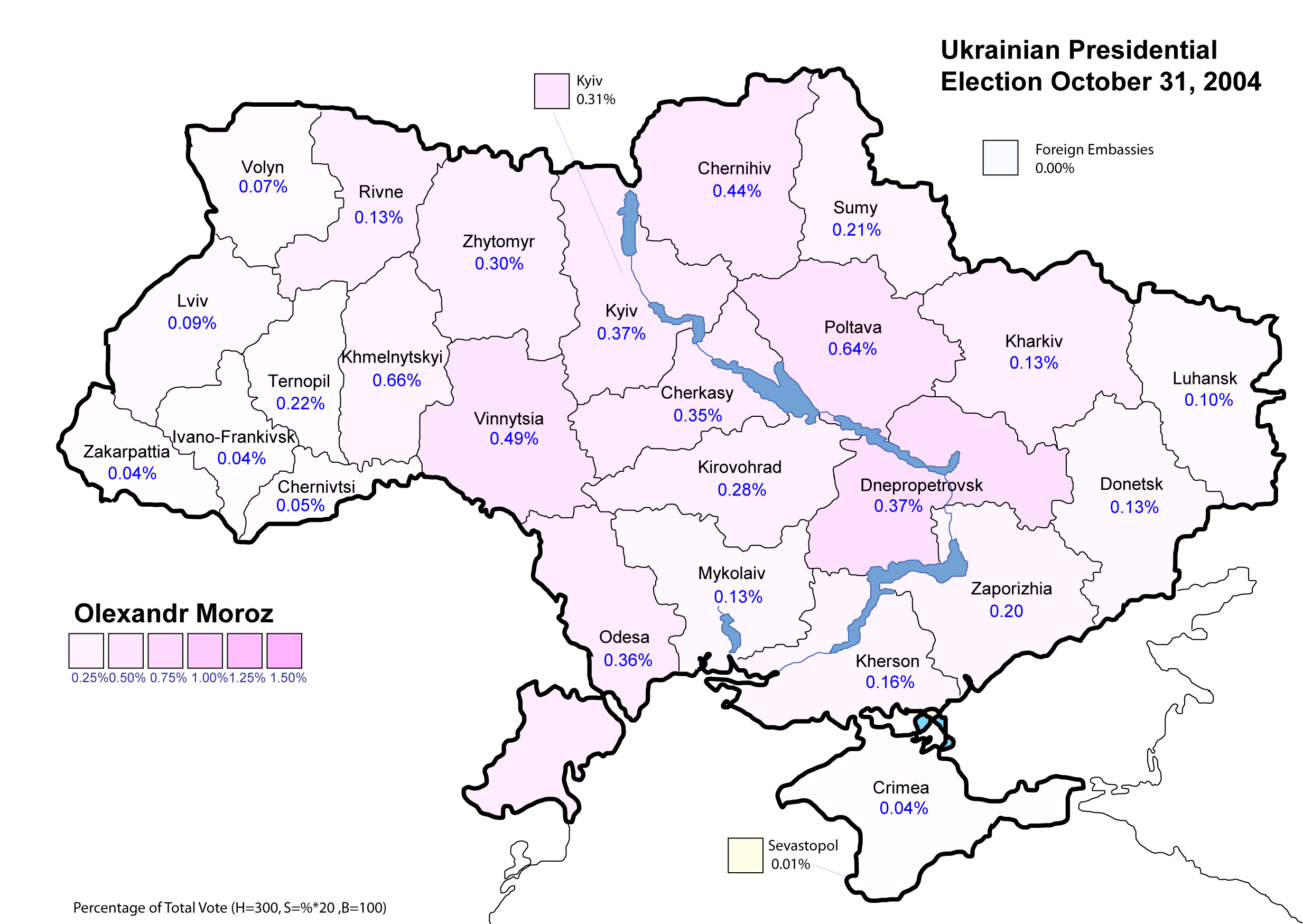
Oleksandr Moroz's vote as a percentage of the total national vote in the 2004 presidential election.

In the 2004 presidential election, Moroz was nominated by the Socialist Party which he has chaired since 1991. He won third place with 5.81% of the vote. As a long-time leader of anti-Kuchma forces, Moroz quickly announced his support for Viktor Yushchenko's presidential bid against Kuchma's Prime Minister Viktor Yanukovych, thus making Yushchenko the favourite to win in round two. That Yushchenko did not win despite this endorsement was used to argue that there was election fraud in the run-off.

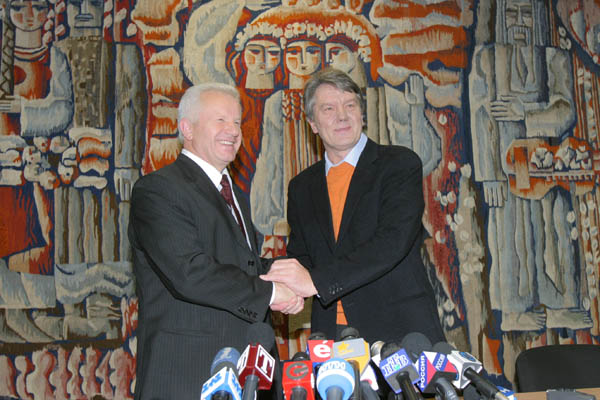
Moroz (left) and Viktor Yushchenko, 2004.

Moroz supported the subsequent Orange Revolution, the mass protests that eventually led to the annulment of the vote results and to a revote won by Yushchenko. The support of the Socialist Party he brought to Yushchenko's campaign was important to widen Yushchenko's appeal to voters. Similarly, the votes of Moroz's Socialist Party faction in the Verkhovna Rada were crucial for passing several important resolutions during the Orange Revolution, particularly the non-confidence vote in the Kuchma–Yanukovych government involved in election fraud scandal.

After the 2006 parliamentary election, Moroz was elected the Chairman of the Verkhovna Rada of Ukraine on 6 July 2006 (238 ayes, 226 needed for election) with support of the Party of Regions, the Socialist Party and Communist factions. The Socialist Party of Ukraine received 2.86% of the national vote in the 2007 parliamentary election, falling 0.14% below the election threshold, denying them the right of representation and removing Moroz as a member of the Verkhovna Rada.

== Subsequent political activities ==
The Socialist Party chose the party leader Oleksandr Moroz as their presidential candidate for the 2010 presidential election, whose first-round ballot was scheduled to be held on 17 January 2010. 268 out of 422 party congress delegates registered supported Moroz's nomination. During the election, Moroz received 0,38% of the votes. Public opinion polls did not rate the Socialist Party or its leader Moroz as they were undecided as to their participation in the presidential election. An opinion poll conducted by FOM-Ukraine in April 2009 showed Moroz with less than 1% support, with most analysts not considering Moroz as a serious contender as he would not win sufficient number of votes in the first-round presidential ballot, scheduled for 17 January 2010.

After leading his party for twenty years, Moroz was succeeded as party leader by Vasyl Tsushko in July 2010. However, he was again elected as party leader in August 2011. In April 2012, Petro Ustenko was elected as Moroz's successor as party leader.

Moroz tried to return to the Verkhovna Rada in the 2012 parliamentary election, running as an independent candidate for single-member district number 93 (first-past-the-post winning a seat) located in Kyiv Oblast. Moroz was unsuccessful, finishing in third with 11.94% of the vote.

Moroz left the Socialist Party, at this point split between two factions, and took over the United Social Democratic Party "Svoi" in 2016. It was renamed Truth and Justice the same year and then Oleksandr Moroz for Truth in 2017. The party was renamed again in 2017, after the original Socialist Party was taken over by Illia Kyva, into Socialist Party of Oleksandr Moroz.

In the 2019 Ukrainian presidential election, Moroz ran as a candidate of his Socialist Party with the support of Mykola Sadovy's faction of the original Socialist Party.

== Political views ==
Since organising the left-leaning Socialist Party of Ukraine, his party ideology largely evolved from orthodox Communism (Marxism–Leninism) to social democracy. He himself is a left-wing social democrat, although he has used both Marxist and social democratic rhetoric. For his moderate ideals, he met strong opposition from the more conservative wing of his party, represented by the supporters of Nataliya Vitrenko. Vitrenko eventually left the Socialist Party, proclaimed the Progressive Socialist Party of Ukraine, and branded Moroz as an "opportunist" and "traitor", helping Kuchma to fight the opposition of Ukraine, which included the Socialist Party. After the last radicals headed by Ivan Chyzh left the party and formed an organization called Spravedlyvist (Justness), Moroz was able to transform his party closer to the European social democratic model.

Moroz and his party supported the political reform and Ukraine's transition towards a more European parliamentary democracy which shifted the power balance in Ukraine stripping the President of some of his powers in favour of the Verkhovna Rada. During the Orange Revolution, his party voted for changes to the Constitution of Ukraine, changes which reduced the powers of the presidency. Moroz has also spoken in support of the preservation of land for Ukrainian farmers and has made many promises about resolving social problems using socialist rhetoric. The program of his party begins with a statement that demands real democracy for working people

In a 2018 interview on 112 Ukraine, Moroz claimed that the world is controlled by a cabal including the Federal Reserve and the Rockefeller, Rothschild, and Morgan families, which stabilises the global economy and appoints world leaders. He also stated that the main opponents of this cabal are Russia and China, and asserted that former President Yushchenko is a puppet of the United States Department of State, which, according to Moroz, is itself controlled by this cabal.

Since the 2022 Russian invasion of Ukraine, Moroz has come out in favour of Ukrainian membership of NATO, referring to it as an "objective necessity".

== Bibliography ==
Moroz is fond of poetry and chess. He has written the following books:

- Куди йдемо?... [Where are we going?...]. Kyiv: Association "Postup". 1993. ISBN 5-7707-5030-8.
- Тема для роздумів [Subject for thoughts]. Kyiv: Zlahoda. 1995. ISBN 5-7707-5568-7.
- Вибір [Choice]. 1996.
- Дорога, з якої не зійти [An unavoidable path]. 1999. OCLC 58407685.
- Між вічними полюсами [Between permanent poles]. Kyiv: Parlaments'ke vydavnytstvo. 1999. ISBN 966-7288-93-5.
- Про землю, Конституцію і не тільки [About land, Constitution and not only]. Kyiv: Redaction of newspaper "Tovarysh". 2000. ISBN 966-7864-00-6.
- Хроніка одного злочину [The chronicle of the crime]. Kyiv: Politrada SPU. 2001. OCLC 49307992.
- Політична анатомія України [Political anatomy of Ukraine]. Kyiv: Parlaments'ke vydavnytstvo. 2004. ISBN 966-611-274-4.
- Жива стерня [Live stubble]. Kyiv: Parlaments'ke vydavnytstvo. 2004. ISBN 966-611-273-6. Recognized by international literature award named after Hryhori Skovoroda.
- ...З відстані [...From distance]. Kyiv: Parlaments'ke vydavnytstvo. 2004. ISBN 966-611-278-7.
- Обличчям до вогню [Facing fire]. Kyiv: Tomiris. 2006. Poetry collection in Ukrainian language
- Белый снег на каменной террасе [White snow on stone terrace]. 2006. Poetry collection in Russian language.
- Кують зозули. Kyiv: Parlaments'ke vydavnytstvo. 2007. ISBN 978-966-611-567-9.

== Notes ==
Political offices
Preceded by Ivan Plyushch	Chairman of the Verkhovna Rada; 1994–1998	Succeeded by Oleksandr Tkachenko
Preceded by Volodymyr Lytvyn	Chairman of the Verkhovna Rada; 2006–2007	Succeeded by Arseniy Yatsenyuk
