= 3rd Ukrainian Verkhovna Rada =

The 3rd Ukrainian Verkhovna Rada began its term on 29 March 1998, continuing until 14 May 2002. 450 members were initially elected during the 1998 Ukrainian parliamentary election.

== Party list People's Deputies ==
Party list number	Deputy	Assumed office	Left office	Lifespan
Communist Party of Ukraine, No. 1	Petro Symonenko	1994	2002	Born 1 August 1952 (age 74)
Communist Party of Ukraine, No. 2	Omelian Parubok	1975	2002	21 January 1940 – 20 June 2017 (aged 77)
Communist Party of Ukraine, No. 3	Anatolii Nalyvaiko	1998	2002	Born 21 November 1956 (age 69)
Communist Party of Ukraine, No. 4	Borys Oliynyk	1992	2002	22 October 1935 – 30 April 2017 (aged 81)
Communist Party of Ukraine, No. 5	Valeriya Zaklunna	1992	2002	15 August 1942 – 22 October 2016 (aged 74)
Communist Party of Ukraine, No. 6	Adam Martyniuk	1998	2002	Born 16 August 1950 (age 76)
Communist Party of Ukraine, No. 7	Anatolii Draholiuntsev	1998	2002	Born 18 June 1938 (age 88)
Communist Party of Ukraine, No. 8	Vasyl Sirenko	1998	2002	Born 11 November 1941 (age 84)
Communist Party of Ukraine, No. 9	Borys Molchanov	1998	2002	Born 8 May 1949 (age 77)
Communist Party of Ukraine, No. 10	Anatolii Strohov	1998	2002	Born 19 October 1934 (age 92)
Communist Party of Ukraine, No. 11	Vacant			
Communist Party of Ukraine, No. 12	Volodymyr Matvieiev	1998	2002	24 July 1943 – 5 November 2024 (aged 81)
Communist Party of Ukraine, No. 13	Yurii Syzenko	1998	2002	Born 19 January 1956 (age 70)
Communist Party of Ukraine, No. 14	Oleh Hrachev	1998	2002	Born 27 August 1950 (age 76)
Communist Party of Ukraine, No. 15	Vasyl Khara	1998	2002	Born 11 September 1947 (age 79)
Communist Party of Ukraine, No. 17	Volodymyr Anishchuk	1998	2002	Born 9 December 1943 (age 82)
Communist Party of Ukraine, No. 18	Heorhiy Kryuchkov	1998	2002	20 October 1929 – 4 November 2021 (aged 92)
Communist Party of Ukraine, No. 19	Volodymyr Yeshchenko	1998	2002	Born 25 August 1949 (age 77)
Communist Party of Ukraine, No. 20	Vitalii Lutsenko	1998	1999	15 March 1937 – 3 June 1999 (aged 62)
Communist Party of Ukraine, No. 21	Volodymyr Chekalin	1998	2002	Born 29 February 1948 (age 78)
Communist Party of Ukraine, No. 22	Heorhii Ponomarenko	1998	2002	Born 15 December 1939 (age 86)
Communist Party of Ukraine, No. 23	Nataliia Zhezhuk	1998	2002	Born 3 August 1977 (age 49)
Communist Party of Ukraine, No. 24	Alla Aleksandrovska	1998	2002	Born 7 December 1948 (age 77)
Communist Party of Ukraine, No. 25	Stanislav Hurenko	1998	2002	30 May 1936 – 14 April 2013 (aged 76)
Communist Party of Ukraine, No. 26	Heorhii Buiko	1998	2002	Born 21 August 1947 (age 79)
Communist Party of Ukraine, No. 27	Yehor Annenkov	1994	2002	Born 3 May 1941 (age 85)
Communist Party of Ukraine, No. 28	Hennadii Dolzhenko	1994	2002	Born 14 January 1940 (age 86)
Communist Party of Ukraine, No. 29	Alina Vedmid	1998	2002	28 June 1940 – 4 September 2008 (aged 68)
Communist Party of Ukraine, No. 30	Yevhen Marmazov	1988	2002	Born 14 June 1938 (age 88)
Communist Party of Ukraine, No. 31	Ihor Korniichuk	1998	2002	Born 29 November 1962 (age 63)
Communist Party of Ukraine, No. 32	Serhii Chychkanov	1998	2002	Born 16 April 1952 (age 74)
Communist Party of Ukraine, No. 33	Oleksandr Holub	1998	2002	Born 19 July 1967 (age 59)
Communist Party of Ukraine, No. 34	Kateryna Samoilyk	1994	2002	Born 20 December 1951 (age 74)
Communist Party of Ukraine, No. 35	Oleksandr Bondarchuk	1998	2002	Born 30 September 1957 (age 69)
Communist Party of Ukraine, No. 36	Valerii Mishura	1994	2002	Born 5 January 1941 (age 85)
Communist Party of Ukraine, No. 37	Anatolii Vasylenko	1998	2002	Born 3 September 1944 (age 82)
Communist Party of Ukraine, No. 38	Vacant			
Communist Party of Ukraine, No. 39	Viktor Borshchevskyi	1998	2002	Born 2 January 1951 (age 75)
Communist Party of Ukraine, No. 40	Valentyn Matvieiev	1998	2002	Born 28 March 1943 (age 83)
Communist Party of Ukraine, No. 41	Oleh Panasovskyi	1990	2002	Born 8 May 1940 (age 86)
Communist Party of Ukraine, No. 42	Stanislav Pkhydenko	1998	2002	Born 18 September 1941 (age 85)
Communist Party of Ukraine, No. 43	Leonid Yakovenko	1998	1999	25 October 1946 – 21 January 1999 (aged 52)
Communist Party of Ukraine, No. 44	Anatolii Domanskyi	1998	2002	Born 23 September 1939 (age 87)
Communist Party of Ukraine, No. 45	Anatolii Levchenko	1994	2002	Born 11 April 1950 (age 76)
Communist Party of Ukraine, No. 46	Volodymyr Simonov	1998	2002	Born 27 September 1947 (age 79)
Communist Party of Ukraine, No. 47	Volodymyr Kyryl	1998	2002	Born 20 June 1950 (age 76)
Communist Party of Ukraine, No. 48	Viktor Petrov	1998	2002	Born 24 December 1947 (age 78)
Communist Party of Ukraine, No. 49	Pylyp Buzhdyhan	1998	2002	Born 20 June 1952 (age 74)
Communist Party of Ukraine, No. 50	Svitlana Synenko	1998	2002	Born 9 January 1964 (age 62)
Communist Party of Ukraine, No. 51	Leonid Dainenko	1998	2002	Born 14 January 1935 (age 91)
Communist Party of Ukraine, No. 52	Ivan Myhovych	1998	2002	Born 17 September 1942 (age 84)
Communist Party of Ukraine, No. 53	Pavlo Tyshchenko	1998	2002	Born 3 January 1951 (age 75)
Communist Party of Ukraine, No. 54	Vasyl Krutsenko	1998	2002	Born 13 September 1940 (age 86)
Communist Party of Ukraine, No. 55	Oleksandr Starynets	1998	2002	Born 16 March 1970 (age 56)
Communist Party of Ukraine, No. 56	Anatolii Morozov	1998	2002	Born 16 August 1955 (age 71)
Communist Party of Ukraine, No. 57	Volodymyr Petrenko	1998	2002	Born 21 September 1947 (age 79)
Communist Party of Ukraine, No. 58	Oleksandr Kushnir	1998	2002	Born 1 September 1946 (age 80)
Communist Party of Ukraine, No. 59	Vacant			
Communist Party of Ukraine, No. 60	Serhii Dorohuntsov	1998	2002	22 September 1929 – 20 February 2010 (aged 80)
Communist Party of Ukraine, No. 61	Leonid Stryzhko	1998	2002	Born 18 August 1948 (age 78)
Communist Party of Ukraine, No. 62	Valerii Chychkov	1998	2002	Born 26 April 1949 (age 77)
Communist Party of Ukraine, No. 63	Vacant			
Communist Party of Ukraine, No. 64	Vacant			
Communist Party of Ukraine, No. 65	Valerii Kucherenko	1998	2002	Born 20 March 1948 (age 78)
Communist Party of Ukraine, No. 66	Vacant			
Communist Party of Ukraine, No. 67	Ivan Varbanets	1998	1999	7 December 1943 – 23 January 1999 (aged 55)
Communist Party of Ukraine, No. 68	Volodymyr Oplachko	1998	2002	Born 21 October 1947 (age 79)
Communist Party of Ukraine, No. 69	Anatolii Kondratenko	1998	2002	Born 16 November 1940 (age 85)
Communist Party of Ukraine, No. 70	Mykhailo Tush	1998	2002	9 October 1943 – 4 January 2013 (aged 69)
Communist Party of Ukraine, No. 71	Vacant			
Communist Party of Ukraine, No. 72	Vacant			
Communist Party of Ukraine, No. 73	Vacant			
Communist Party of Ukraine, No. 74	Bronislav Raikovskyi	1998	2002	Born 21 February 1957 (age 69)
Communist Party of Ukraine, No. 75	Liudmyla Pasiechna	1994	2002	Born 16 June 1948 (age 78)
Communist Party of Ukraine, No. 76	Andri Zvonarzh	1998	2002	Born 2 January 1976 (age 50)
Communist Party of Ukraine, No. 77	Heorhii Popov	1998	2002	Born 18 June 1946 (age 80)
Communist Party of Ukraine, No. 78	Vacant			
Communist Party of Ukraine, No. 79	Kostiantyn Okhrimenko	1994	2002	Born 23 February 1949 (age 77)
Communist Party of Ukraine, No. 80	Oleksandr Malievskyi	1994	2002	Born 9 September 1944 (age 82)
Communist Party of Ukraine, No. 81	Liubov Fedorenko	1998	2002	Born 8 May 1949 (age 77)
Communist Party of Ukraine, No. 82	Vacant			
Communist Party of Ukraine, No. 83	Anatolii Khunov	1998	2002	Born 25 March 1940 (age 86)
Communist Party of Ukraine, No. 84	Serhii Sinchenko	1998	2002	Born 5 October 1956 (age 70)
Communist Party of Ukraine, No. 85	Vacant			
Communist Party of Ukraine, No. 86	Borys Kozhevnikov	1998	2002	Born 5 October 1946 (age 80)
Communist Party of Ukraine, No. 87	Mykola Chyviuk	1998	2002	Born 24 September 1964 (age 62)
Communist Party of Ukraine, No. 88	Vacant			
Communist Party of Ukraine, No. 89	Yevhen Krasniakov	1994	2002	Born 25 July 1960 (age 66)
Communist Party of Ukraine, No. 90	Vacant			
Communist Party of Ukraine, No. 91	Mykola Kukharchuk	1998	2002	Born 5 August 1952 (age 74)
Communist Party of Ukraine, No. 92	Vacant			
Communist Party of Ukraine, No. 93	Anatolii Peihalainen	1994	2002	Born 28 November 1945 (age 80)
Communist Party of Ukraine, No. 94	Vladyslav Stepura	1998	2002	Born 21 March 1938 (age 88)
Communist Party of Ukraine, No. 95	Nataliia Shtepa	1994	2002	Born 16 November 1951 (age 74)
Communist Party of Ukraine, No. 96	Anatolii Khmeliovyi	1994	2002	Born 17 January 1952 (age 74)
Communist Party of Ukraine, No. 97	Vacant			
Communist Party of Ukraine, No. 98	Pavlo Kuznietsov	1994	2002	1 May 1950 – 27 January 2022 (aged 71)
Communist Party of Ukraine, No. 99	Vasyl Lantukh	1994	2002	Born 1 March 1954 (age 72)
Communist Party of Ukraine, No. 100	Vasyl Tereshchuk	1998	2002	Born 1 December 1957 (age 68)
Communist Party of Ukraine, No. 101	Vacant			
Communist Party of Ukraine, No. 102	Olha Hinzburh	1998	2002	Born 14 September 1953 (age 73)
Communist Party of Ukraine, No. 103	Valerii Ivanov	1999	2002	Born 24 December 1947 (age 78)
Communist Party of Ukraine, No. 103	Valentyn Anastasiiev	1999	2002	22 February 1925 – 24 February 2009 (aged 84)
Communist Party of Ukraine, No. 105	Yurii Solomatin	1999	2002	Born 3 July 1937 (age 89)
People's Movement of Ukraine, No. 1	Viacheslav Chornovil	1990	1999	24 December 1937 – 25 March 1999 (aged 61)
People's Movement of Ukraine, No. 2	Vacant			
People's Movement of Ukraine, No. 3	Hennadiy Udovenko	1998	2002	22 June 1931 – 12 February 2013 (aged 81)
People's Movement of Ukraine, No. 4	Vacant			
People's Movement of Ukraine, No. 5	Yuriy Kostenko	1998	2002	Born 12 June 1951 (age 75)
People's Movement of Ukraine, No. 6	Ivan Zaiets	1998	2000	Born 5 July 1952 (age 74)
People's Movement of Ukraine, No. 7	Bohdan Boyko	1990	2002	Born 29 September 1954 (age 72)
People's Movement of Ukraine, No. 8	Vacant			
People's Movement of Ukraine, No. 9	Mustafa Dzhemilev	1998	2002	Born 13 November 1943 (age 82)
People's Movement of Ukraine, No. 10	Vacant			
People's Movement of Ukraine, No. 11	Vacant			
People's Movement of Ukraine, No. 12	Borys Kozhyn	1994	2002	Born 25 September 1944 (age 82)
People's Movement of Ukraine, No. 13	Olena Bondarenko	1998	2002	Born 13 February 1955 (age 71)
People's Movement of Ukraine, No. 14	Vacant			
People's Movement of Ukraine, No. 15	Ihor Yukhnovskyi	1990	2002	1 September 1925 – 26 March 2024 (aged 98)
People's Movement of Ukraine, No. 16	Vacant			
People's Movement of Ukraine, No. 17	Liliia Hryhorovych	1994	2002	Born 12 September 1957 (age 69)
People's Movement of Ukraine, No. 18	Vyacheslav Kyrylenko	1998	2002	Born 7 June 1968 (age 58)
People's Movement of Ukraine, No. 19	Vasyl Chervoniy	1990	2002	24 August 1958 – 4 July 2009 (aged 50)
People's Movement of Ukraine, No. 20	Yaroslav Fedoryn	1998	2002	Born 1 June 1955 (age 71)
People's Movement of Ukraine, No. 21	Viacheslav Koval	1998	2000	Born 5 November 1945 (age 80)
People's Movement of Ukraine, No. 22	Vasyl Shepa	1990	2002	28 March 1931 – 13 March 2011 (aged 79)
People's Movement of Ukraine, No. 23	Vacant			
People's Movement of Ukraine, No. 24	Roman Zvarych	1998	2002	Born 20 November 1953 (age 72)
People's Movement of Ukraine, No. 25	Ivan Boichuk	1998	2002	21 October 1951 – 11 April 2019 (aged 67)
People's Movement of Ukraine, No. 26	Vacant			
People's Movement of Ukraine, No. 27	Eduard Krech	1998	2002	6 June 1948 – June 2017 (aged 68–69)
People's Movement of Ukraine, No. 28	Vitalii Shevchenko	1994	2002	23 June 1954 – 19 September 2018 (aged 64)
People's Movement of Ukraine, No. 29	Vacant			
People's Movement of Ukraine, No. 30	Heorhii Manchulenko	1994	2002	Born 20 March 1963 (age 63)
People's Movement of Ukraine, No. 31	Yevhen Sihal	1998	2002	Born 19 May 1955 (age 71)
People's Movement of Ukraine, No. 32	Vacant			
People's Movement of Ukraine, No. 33	Dmytro Pavlychko	1998	2000	28 September 1929 – 29 January 2023 (aged 93)
People's Movement of Ukraine, No. 34	Viktor Chaika	1998	2002	Born 17 January 1962 (age 64)
People's Movement of Ukraine, No. 35	Valeriy Borzov	1998	2002	Born 20 October 1949 (age 77)
People's Movement of Ukraine, No. 36	Valerii Alioshyn	1998	2002	Born 1 January 1957 (age 69)
People's Movement of Ukraine, No. 37	Valeriy Asadchev	1998	2002	Born 14 July 1953 (age 73)
People's Movement of Ukraine, No. 38	Bohdan Kostyniuk	1998	2002	Born 6 September 1958 (age 68)
People's Movement of Ukraine, No. 39	Yurii Kliuchkovskyi	1998	2002	Born 18 July 1949 (age 77)
People's Movement of Ukraine, No. 40	Dmytro Chobit	1990	2002	Born 19 February 1952 (age 74)
People's Movement of Ukraine, No. 41	Lev Hlukhivskyi	1994	2002	Born 28 October 1942 (age 83)
People's Movement of Ukraine, No. 42	Ihor Tarasiuk	1998	2002	Born 10 May 1967 (age 59)
People's Movement of Ukraine, No. 43	Oleksandr Chornovolenko	1998	2002	Born 28 March 1955 (age 71)
People's Movement of Ukraine, No. 44	Yaroslav Kendzior	1999	2002	Born 12 July 1941 (age 85)
People's Movement of Ukraine, No. 45	Valentyna Protsenko	1999	2002	Born 11 December 1948 (age 77)
People's Movement of Ukraine, No. 46	Vacant			
People's Movement of Ukraine, No. 47	Mykola Kulchynskyi	2000	2002	Born 10 April 1947 (age 79)
People's Movement of Ukraine, No. 48	Viktor Taran-Teren	2000	2002	Born 9 July 1941 (age 85)
Socialist Party – Peasant Party, No. 1	Vacant (Note: Held by Oleksandr Moroz, who was elected in Ukraine's 92nd electoral district.)			
Socialist Party – Peasant Party, No. 2	Serhii Dovhan	1994	2002	Born 6 March 1952 (age 74)
Socialist Party – Peasant Party, No. 3	Viktor Suslov	1994	2002	Born 25 February 1955 (age 71)
Socialist Party – Peasant Party, No. 4	Vacant			
Socialist Party – Peasant Party, No. 5	Ivan Bokyi	1998	2002	20 February 1942 – 24 March 2020 (aged 78)
Socialist Party – Peasant Party, No. 6	Vacant			
Socialist Party – Peasant Party, No. 7	Vacant			
Socialist Party – Peasant Party, No. 8	Kostiantyn Dovhan	1998	2002	Born 5 October 1954 (age 72)
Socialist Party – Peasant Party, No. 9	Yosyp Vinsky	1994	2002	Born 2 January 1956 (age 70)
Socialist Party – Peasant Party, No. 10	Nina Markovska	1994	2002	Born 18 October 1947 (age 79)
Socialist Party – Peasant Party, No. 11	Valentyn Zubov	1998	2002	Born 10 June 1946 (age 80)
Socialist Party – Peasant Party, No. 12	Mykhailo Stepanov	1994	2002	Born 27 March 1952 (age 74)
Socialist Party – Peasant Party, No. 13	Yevhen Kyrylchuk	1994	2002	Born 3 October 1940 (age 86)
Socialist Party – Peasant Party, No. 14	Serhii Kiiashko	1998	2002	Born 7 August 1954 (age 72)
Socialist Party – Peasant Party, No. 15	Nina Pokotylo	1998	2002	Born 26 March 1947 (age 79)
Socialist Party – Peasant Party, No. 16	Anatolii Novyk	1998	2002	Born 17 July 1948 (age 78)
Socialist Party – Peasant Party, No. 17	Volodymyr Makeyenko	1998	2002	Born 17 July 1965 (age 61)
Socialist Party – Peasant Party, No. 18	Anatolii Drobotov	1998	2002	Born 21 May 1951 (age 75)
Socialist Party – Peasant Party, No. 19	Mykola Lavrynenko	1994	2002	Born 7 December 1948 (age 77)
Socialist Party – Peasant Party, No. 20	Oleksiy Kostusyev	1998	2001	Born 29 June 1954 (age 72)
Socialist Party – Peasant Party, No. 21	Ivan Baranchyk	1998	2002	Born 1 February 1951 (age 75)
Socialist Party – Peasant Party, No. 22	Ivan Musiienko	1990	2002	Born 13 February 1943 (age 83)
Socialist Party – Peasant Party, No. 23	Oleksii Yushchyk	1998	2002	Born 27 October 1947 (age 78)
Socialist Party – Peasant Party, No. 24	Serhii Sas	1994	2002	Born 7 August 1957 (age 69)
Socialist Party – Peasant Party, No. 25	Volodymyr Satsiuk	1998	2002	Born 11 March 1963 (age 63)
Socialist Party – Peasant Party, No. 26	Vadym Misiura	1998	2002	Born 23 September 1962 (age 64)
Socialist Party – Peasant Party, No. 27	Volodymyr Shpihalo	1998	2002	Born 23 August 1933 (age 93)
Socialist Party – Peasant Party, No. 28	Anatolii Stankov	1998	2002	Born 14 June 1942 (age 84)
Socialist Party – Peasant Party, No. 29	Volodymyr Mukhin	1994	2002	Born 28 June 1949 (age 77)
Socialist Party – Peasant Party, No. 30	Mykola Kushnirov	1998	2002	Born 20 August 1945 (age 81)
Socialist Party – Peasant Party, No. 31	Vasyl Sinko	1998	2002	Born 5 October 1939 (age 87)
Socialist Party – Peasant Party, No. 32	Hryhorii Dovhanchyn	1994	2002	Born 1 February 1948 (age 78)
Socialist Party – Peasant Party, No. 33	Valentyna Semenyuk-Samsonenko	1994	2002	4 June 1957 – 27 August 2014 (aged 57)
Socialist Party – Peasant Party, No. 34	Volodymyr Cherepkov	2001	2002	Born 8 April 1947 (age 79)
Party of Greens of Ukraine, No. 1	Vitaliy Kononov	1998	2002	Born 2 April 1950 (age 76)
Party of Greens of Ukraine, No. 2	Oleh Shevchuk	1998	2000	Born 2 January 1968 (age 58)
Party of Greens of Ukraine, No. 3	Vasyl Khmelnytsky	1998	2002	Born 10 September 1966 (age 60)
Party of Greens of Ukraine, No. 4	Serhii Kurykin	1998	2001	Born 1 June 1959 (age 67)
Party of Greens of Ukraine, No. 5	Yurii Samoilenko	1998	2002	Born 26 July 1949 (age 77)
Party of Greens of Ukraine, No. 6	Volodymyr Yelchaninov	1998	2002	Born 25 April 1959 (age 67)
Party of Greens of Ukraine, No. 7	Serhii Kryvosheia	1998	2002	Born 6 December 1959 (age 66)
Party of Greens of Ukraine, No. 8	Serhii Rys	1998	2002	Born 13 July 1958 (age 68)
Party of Greens of Ukraine, No. 9	Orest Melnykov	1998	2002	Born 7 October 1943 (age 83)
Party of Greens of Ukraine, No. 10	Viktor Tkachuk	1998	2002	Born 3 September 1965 (age 61)
Party of Greens of Ukraine, No. 11	Ihor Kryiushyn	1998	2002	Born 19 November 1958 (age 67)
Party of Greens of Ukraine, No. 12	Serhii Pavlenko	1998	2002	Born 21 May 1956 (age 70)
Party of Greens of Ukraine, No. 13	Serhii Moskvin	1998	2002	Born 10 June 1954 (age 72)
Party of Greens of Ukraine, No. 14	Irina Belousova	1998	2002	Born 10 June 1954 (age 72)
Party of Greens of Ukraine, No. 15	Iryna Liutikova	1998	2002	Born 26 August 1965 (age 61)
Party of Greens of Ukraine, No. 16	Ihor Havrylov	1998	2002	Born 27 March 1955 (age 71)
Party of Greens of Ukraine, No. 17	Oleh Polishchuk	1998	2002	Born 21 July 1968 (age 58)
Party of Greens of Ukraine, No. 18	Mykhailo Hutsol	1998	2002	Born 30 June 1951 (age 75)
Party of Greens of Ukraine, No. 19	Denys Kostrzhevskyi	1998	2002	Born 29 October 1968 (age 57)
Party of Greens of Ukraine, No. 20	Viktor Khazan	2000	2002	Born 18 March 1947 (age 79)
Party of Greens of Ukraine, No. 21	Oleksandr Horoshkevych	2001	2002	Born 8 March 1964 (age 62)
Party of Greens of Ukraine, No. 25	Vitalii Shylo	2002	2002	Born 13 March 1937 (age 89)
People's Democratic Party, No. 1	Vacant			
People's Democratic Party, No. 2	Vacant			
People's Democratic Party, No. 3	Ivan Plyushch	1990	2002	11 September 1941 – 25 June 2014 (aged 72)
People's Democratic Party, No. 6	Oleksandr Yemets	1998	2001	1 January 1959 – 28 January 2001 (aged 42)
People's Democratic Party, No. 7	Volodymyr Filenko	1998	2002	Born 11 October 1955 (age 71)
People's Democratic Party, No. 8	Petro Melnyk	1998	2002	18 June 1957 – 16 December 2018 (aged 61)
People's Democratic Party, No. 9	Serhii Podhornyi	1998	2002	Born 8 March 1956 (age 70)
People's Democratic Party, No. 10	Taras Stetskiv	1998	2002	Born 7 June 1964 (age 62)
People's Democratic Party, No. 11	Roman Bezsmertnyi	1998	2002	Born 15 November 1965 (age 60)
People's Democratic Party, No. 12	Oleh Zarubinskyi	1998	2002	Born 26 October 1963 (age 62)
People's Democratic Party, No. 13	Oleksandr Terentiuk	1998	1998	Born 17 April 1957 (age 69)
People's Democratic Party, No. 14	Oleksandr Karpov	1998	2002	Born 1 December 1949 (age 76)
People's Democratic Party, No. 15	Volodymyr Kafarskyi	1998	2002	Born 28 July 1949 (age 77)
People's Democratic Party, No. 16	Ihor Koliushko	1998	2002	Born 18 June 1965 (age 61)
People's Democratic Party, No. 17	Kostiantyn Sytnyk	1998	2002	3 June 1926 – 22 July 2017 (aged 91)
People's Democratic Party, No. 18	Borys Bespalyi	1998	2002	25 May 1953 – 17 October 2022 (aged 69)
People's Democratic Party, No. 19	Artur Bilorus	1998	2002	Born 7 January 1968 (age 58)
People's Democratic Party, No. 20	Yurii Sakhno	1998	2002	Born 27 March 1954 (age 72)
People's Democratic Party, No. 23	Serhiy Larin	1998	2002	Born 11 January 1962 (age 64)
People's Democratic Party, No. 24	Igor Sharov	1998	2002	Born 10 August 1961 (age 65)
People's Democratic Party, No. 25	Anatolii Volok	2001	2002	Born 13 September 1951 (age 75)
Hromada, No. 2	Petro Tolochko	1998	2002	21 February 1938 – 28 April 2024 (aged 86)
Hromada, No. 3	Dmytro Dvorkis	1998	2002	Born 28 January 1945 (age 81)
Hromada, No. 4	Dmytro Hnatyuk	1998	2002	28 March 1925 – 29 April 2016 (aged 91)
Hromada, No. 5	Volodymyr Pliutynskyi	1998	2002	4 May 1927 – 14 September 2009 (aged 82)
Hromada, No. 8	Oleh Bilorus	1998	2002	Born 14 October 1939 (age 87)
Hromada, No. 9	Serhiy Poliakov	1998	2002	Born 23 January 1953 (age 73)
Hromada, No. 11	Yurik Mkrtchian	1998	1999	14 September 1939 – 29 January 1999 (aged 59)
Hromada, No. 12	Oleksandr Turchynov	1998	2002	Born 31 March 1964 (age 62)
Hromada, No. 13	Viktor Omelich	1998	2002	Born 24 September 1941 (age 85)
Hromada, No. 14	Volodymyr Zaplatynskyi	1998	2002	13 September 1951 – 30 June 2018 (aged 66)
Hromada, No. 15	Serhii Pravdenko	1998	2002	29 April 1949 – 24 June 2017 (aged 68)
Hromada, No. 16	Oleh Blokhin	1998	2002	Born 5 November 1952 (age 73)
Hromada, No. 17	Oleksii Remeniuk	1998	2002	12 January 1956 – 9 November 2022 (aged 66)
Hromada, No. 18	Natalia Donets	1998	2002	Born 23 May 1957 (age 69)
Hromada, No. 19	Volodymyr Shushkevych	1998	2002	Born 25 April 1965 (age 61)
Hromada, No. 20	Valeriy Sushkevych	1998	2002	Born 14 June 1954 (age 72)
Hromada, No. 25	Leonid Hadiatskyi	1999	2002	Born 11 February 1961 (age 65)
Progressive Socialist Party of Ukraine, No. 3	Oleksandr Charodieiev	1998	2002	Born 24 August 1955 (age 71)
Progressive Socialist Party of Ukraine, No. 4	Petro Romanchuk	1998	2002	Born 13 April 1957 (age 69)
Progressive Socialist Party of Ukraine, No. 5	Mykhailo Savenko	1998	2002	Born 7 November 1949 (age 76)
Progressive Socialist Party of Ukraine, No. 6	Tetiana Zadorozhna	1998	2002	Born 1954 (age 71–72)
Progressive Socialist Party of Ukraine, No. 7	Ivan Malolitko	1998	2002	Born 19 July 1943 (age 83)
Progressive Socialist Party of Ukraine, No. 8	Viacheslav Kviat	1998	2002	Born 7 August 1960 (age 66)
Progressive Socialist Party of Ukraine, No. 9	Serhii Tykhonov	1998	2002	Born 13 April 1961 (age 65)
Progressive Socialist Party of Ukraine, No. 10	Mykola Haber	1998	2002	Born 29 October 1960 (age 65)
Progressive Socialist Party of Ukraine, No. 11	Mykhailo Sydorchuk	1998	2002	Born 4 August 1951 (age 75)
Progressive Socialist Party of Ukraine, No. 12	Nataliia Lymar	1998	2002	Born 5 June 1958 (age 68)
Progressive Socialist Party of Ukraine, No. 13	Volodymyr Stozhenko	1998	2002	Born 20 April 1942 (age 84)
Progressive Socialist Party of Ukraine, No. 15	Ivan Kuniov	1998	2000	1 January 1935 – 5 September 2000 (aged 65)
Progressive Socialist Party of Ukraine, No. 16	Liudmyla Bezuhla	1998	2002	Born 1 January 1946 (age 80)
Progressive Socialist Party of Ukraine, No. 17	Olena Mazur	1998	2002	Born 23 January 1960 (age 66)
Progressive Socialist Party of Ukraine, No. 20	Oleksandr Yerokhin	2001	2002	Born 1963 (age 62–63)
Social Democratic Party of Ukraine (united), No. 1	Leonid Kravchuk	1994	2002	10 January 1934 – 10 May 2022 (aged 88)
Social Democratic Party of Ukraine (united), No. 2	Yevhen Marchuk	1998	2000	28 January 1941 – 5 August 2021 (aged 80)
Social Democratic Party of Ukraine (united), No. 3	Vasyl Onopenko	1998	2002	Born 10 April 1949 (age 77)
Social Democratic Party of Ukraine (united), No. 6	Ihor Pluzhnykov	1998	2002	9 September 1958 – 22 June 2005 (aged 46)
Social Democratic Party of Ukraine (united), No. 7	Oleksandr Zinchenko	1998	2002	16 April 1957 – 9 June 2010 (aged 53)
Social Democratic Party of Ukraine (united), No. 8	Vasyl Kremen	1998	2000	Born 25 June 1947 (age 79)
Social Democratic Party of Ukraine (united), No. 9	Bohdan Hubskyi	1998	2002	Born 30 March 1963 (age 63)
Social Democratic Party of Ukraine (united), No. 10	Serhii Melnichuk	1998	2002	30 August 1967 – 16 November 2013 (aged 46)
Social Democratic Party of Ukraine (united), No. 12	Borys Andresiuk	1998	2002	Born 19 February 1956 (age 70)
Social Democratic Party of Ukraine (united), No. 13	Anatolii Volkovskyi	1998	2002	Born 11 October 1938 (age 88)
Social Democratic Party of Ukraine (united), No. 14	Volodymyr Levtsun	1998	2002	Born 14 June 1952 (age 74)
Social Democratic Party of Ukraine (united), No. 15	Serhii Peresunko	1998	2002	Born 2 February 1952 (age 74)
Social Democratic Party of Ukraine (united), No. 16	Mykola Pesotskyi	1998	2002	Born 7 May 1956 (age 70)
Social Democratic Party of Ukraine (united), No. 17	Volodymyr Zaiets	1998	2002	Born 14 June 1960 (age 66)
Social Democratic Party of Ukraine (united), No. 19	Oleh Andreichev	2000	2002	Born 30 June 1953 (age 73)
Social Democratic Party of Ukraine (united), No. 21	Kostiantyn Fesenko	2000	2002	Born 22 May 1947 (age 79)

== Single-mandate district People's Deputies ==
Oblast	District	Deputy	Party	Assumed office	Left office	Lifespan
Autonomous Republic of Crimea	No. 1	Yevhen Leshan	Communist Party of Ukraine	1998	2002	Born 16 November 1975 (age 50)
Autonomous Republic of Crimea	No. 2	Lev Mirimsky	Soyuz	1998	2002	2 April 1960 – 27 April 2017 (aged 57)
Autonomous Republic of Crimea	No. 3	Serhiy Ivanov	Independent	1998	2002	Born 21 January 1952 (age 74)
Autonomous Republic of Crimea	No. 4	Anatolii Rakhanskyi	Independent	1998	2002	30 June 1939 – 10 September 2018 (aged 79)
Autonomous Republic of Crimea	No. 5	Viktor Myronenko	Communist Party of Ukraine	1998	2002	Born 1 November 1956 (age 69)
Autonomous Republic of Crimea	No. 6	Valeriy Horbatov	Independent (Note: Member of the People's Democratic Party from May 1998 to April 1999. Member of Labour Ukraine from April 1999 to January 2000 and from May 2000 to 2002. Member of Regional Revival from January to May 2000.)	1994	2002	Born 27 June 1955 (age 71)
Autonomous Republic of Crimea	No. 7	Ihor Franchuk	Independent	1994	2002	Born 6 July 1968 (age 58)
Autonomous Republic of Crimea	No. 8	Refat Chubarov	People's Movement of Ukraine (Note: Elected as an independent.)	1998	2002	Born 22 September 1957 (age 69)
Autonomous Republic of Crimea	No. 9	Valeriy Khoroshkovskyi	People's Democratic Party	1998	2002	Born 1 January 1969 (age 57)
Autonomous Republic of Crimea	No. 10	Anatoliy Franchuk	Social Democratic Party of Ukraine (united)	1995	2002	8 September 1935 – 7 July 2021 (aged 85)
Vinnytsia Oblast	No. 11	Ihor Kviatkovskyi	People's Democratic Party	1998	2002	Born 9 April 1953 (age 73)
Vinnytsia Oblast	No. 12	Petro Poroshenko	Social Democratic Party of Ukraine (united) (Note: Joined the Solidarity group in 2000.)	1998	2002	Born 26 September 1965 (age 61)
Vinnytsia Oblast	No. 13	Oleh Yukhnovskyi	Independent	1998	2002	Born 17 September 1962 (age 64)
Vinnytsia Oblast	No. 14	Oleksandr Shpak	Labour Ukraine (Note: Previously a member of the People's Democratic Party from May to October 1998 and the Peasant Party of Ukraine from October 1998 to November 1999.)	1998	2002	Born 3 January 1952 (age 74)
Vinnytsia Oblast	No. 15	Mykola Pasieka	Communist Party of Ukraine	1998	2002	Born 18 May 1946 (age 80)
Vinnytsia Oblast	No. 16	Yevhen Smirnov	Labour Ukraine	1994	2002	9 January 1947 – 6 May 2003 (aged 56)
Vinnytsia Oblast	No. 17	Anatoliy Matviyenko	People's Democratic Party	1998	2002	22 March 1953 – 21 May 2020 (aged 67)
Vinnytsia Oblast	No. 18	Oleksandr Stoian	All-Ukrainian Workers' Party	1994	2002	Born 2 May 1943 (age 83)
Volyn Oblast	No. 19	Valerii Dibrova	National Front	1998	2002	Born 18 June 1953 (age 73)
Volyn Oblast	No. 20	Kateryna Vashchuk	Agrarian Party of Ukraine	1994	2002	Born 20 January 1947 (age 79)
Volyn Oblast	No. 21	Mykola Martynenko	People's Democratic Party	1998	2002	Born 12 January 1961 (age 65)
Volyn Oblast	No. 22	Oleksandr Svyryda	Democratic Party of Ukraine	1998	2002	Born 8 July 1967 (age 59)
Volyn Oblast	No. 23	Serhii Shevchuk	People's Democratic Party	1998	2001	Born 17 October 1955 (age 71)
Dnipropetrovsk Oblast	No. 24	Serhii Chukmasov	Hromada	1998	2002	Born 7 August 1955 (age 71)
Dnipropetrovsk Oblast	No. 25	Oleksandr Riabchenko	Party of Greens of Ukraine	1998	2002	Born 25 August 1953 (age 73)
Dnipropetrovsk Oblast	No. 26	Viktor Pinchuk	Labour Ukraine (Note: Member of the People's Democratic Party from May 1998 to April 1999.)	1998	2002	Born 14 December 1960 (age 65)
Dnipropetrovsk Oblast	No. 27	Hennadiy Balashov	Independent	1998	2002	Born 20 February 1961 (age 65)
Dnipropetrovsk Oblast	No. 28	Mykola Ahafonov	Agrarian Party of Ukraine	1998	2002	Born 23 May 1948 (age 78)
Dnipropetrovsk Oblast	No. 29	Valerii Martynovskyi	Batkivshchyna (Note: Member of Hromada from May 1998 to March 1999. Member of Solidarity from February 2000 to December 2001.)	1998	2002	Born 27 December 1955 (age 70)
Dnipropetrovsk Oblast	No. 30	Stanislav Safronov	Hromada	1998	2002	Born 17 June 1956 (age 70)
Dnipropetrovsk Oblast	No. 31	Valerii Shtepa	Communist Party of Ukraine	1998	2002	Born 13 May 1946 (age 80)
Dnipropetrovsk Oblast	No. 32	Vadym Hurov	Democratic Union	1994	2002	22 February 1937 – 16 December 2015 (aged 78)
Dnipropetrovsk Oblast	No. 33	Volodymyr Pustovoitov	Communist Party of Ukraine	1998	2002	Born 1 August 1948 (age 78)
Dnipropetrovsk Oblast	No. 34	Oleksandr Chernichko	Communist Party of Ukraine	1998	2002	Born 17 November 1948 (age 77)
Dnipropetrovsk Oblast	No. 35	Oleksandr Zhyr	Reforms and Order Party	1998	2002	Born 11 December 1957 (age 68)
Dnipropetrovsk Oblast	No. 36	Ivan Kyrylenko	Batkivshchyna (Note: Member of Hromada from May 1998 to March 1999.)	1995	2000	Born 2 October 1956 (age 70)
Dnipropetrovsk Oblast	No. 36	Serhiy Tihipko	Labour Ukraine	2000	2002	Born 13 February 1960 (age 66)
Dnipropetrovsk Oblast	No. 37	Larysa Trofymenko	Hromada	1998	2002	Born 15 February 1950 (age 76)
Dnipropetrovsk Oblast	No. 38	Anatolii Bilyk	Hromada	1998	2002	Born 19 April 1951 (age 75)
Dnipropetrovsk Oblast	No. 39	Volodymyr Aliokhin	Batkivshchyna (Note: Member of Hromada from May 1998 to March 1999. Member of Solidarity from July 2000.)	1998	2002	Born 3 August 1957 (age 69)
Dnipropetrovsk Oblast	No. 40	Pavlo Lazarenko	Hromada	1998	2002	Born 23 January 1953 (age 73)
Donetsk Oblast	No. 41	Volodymyr Shcherban	RAZOM	1998	1999	Born 26 January 1950 (age 76)
Donetsk Oblast	No. 41	Raisa Bohatyriova	Regional Revival	2000	2002	Born 6 January 1953 (age 73)
Donetsk Oblast	No. 42	Ihor Yushko	Independent	1998	2002	Born 21 August 1961 (age 65)
Donetsk Oblast	No. 43	Yukhym Zvyahilsky	Regional Revival	1998	2002	20 February 1933 – 6 November 2021 (aged 88)
Donetsk Oblast	No. 44	Anatolii Pysarenko	Communist Party of Ukraine	1998	2002	Born 2 March 1944 (age 82)
Donetsk Oblast	No. 45	Volodymyr Rybak	Regional Revival	1998	2002	Born 3 October 1946 (age 80)
Donetsk Oblast	No. 46	Oleksandr Rzhavskyi	United Family	1998	2002	30 January 1959 – 27 March 2022 (aged 63)
Donetsk Oblast	No. 47	Mykola Yankovskyi	Labour Ukraine (Note: Member of the People's Democratic Party from May 1998 to April 1999. Member of Regional Revival from March 2001.)	1998	2002	Born 12 August 1944 (age 82)
Donetsk Oblast	No. 48	Vitalii Chernenko	Batkivshchyna	1998	2002	Born 11 February 1945 (age 81)
Donetsk Oblast	No. 49	Viktor Kocherha	Communist Party of Ukraine	1998	2002	Born 13 October 1939 (age 87)
Donetsk Oblast	No. 50	Oleksandr Yakovenko	Communist Party of Ukraine	1998	2002	Born 25 August 1952 (age 74)
Donetsk Oblast	No. 51	Yevhen Konstantynov	Batkivshchyna (Note: Member of Hromada from May 1998 to February 2000. Independent from February to March 2000.)	1998	2002	Born 2 May 1937 (age 89)
Donetsk Oblast	No. 52	Oleksii Shekhovtsov	Independent	1998	2002	Born 10 March 1957 (age 69)
Donetsk Oblast	No. 53	Volodymyr Moiseienko	Communist Party of Ukraine	1998	2002	Born 24 January 1956 (age 70)
Donetsk Oblast	No. 54	Volodymyr Vlasov	Communist Party of Ukraine	1998	2002	Born 13 March 1950 (age 76)
Donetsk Oblast	No. 55	Serhiy Matviyenkov	Independent	1998	2002	Born 16 November 1957 (age 68)
Donetsk Oblast	No. 56	Anatolii Lytiuk	Independent (Note: Member of the People's Democratic Party from May 1998 to March 1999. Member of the Reforms and Order Party from March 1999 to January 2000. Member of Yabluko from September 2000 to April 2001. Member of Regional Revival from April 2001.)	1998	2002	Born 2 August 1949 (age 77)
Donetsk Oblast	No. 57	Mykola Kravchenko	Communist Party of Ukraine	1998	2002	Born 24 October 1952 (age 74)
Donetsk Oblast	No. 58	Oleksandr Lieshchynskyi	Independent (Note: Member of Labour Ukraine from October 2010 to March 2001. Member of Regional Revival from March 2001.)	1998	2002	Born 2 March 1964 (age 62)
Donetsk Oblast	No. 59	Fedir Abramov	Communist Party of Ukraine	1998	2002	7 January 1930 – 21 January 2007 (aged 77)
Donetsk Oblast	No. 60	Mykola Mychko	Social Democratic Party of Ukraine (united) (Note: Member of Hromada from May 1998 to March 1999. Member of Batkivshchyna from March 1999 to October 2000.)	1998	2002	Born 17 April 1948 (age 78)
Donetsk Oblast	No. 61	Hennadii Vasyliev	Labour Ukraine (Note: Member of the People's Democratic Party from May 1998 to May 1999. Member of Labour Ukraine from February 2000.)	1998	2002	Born 3 October 1953 (age 73)
Donetsk Oblast	No. 62	Valeriy Konovalyuk	Regional Revival (Note: Member of the People's Democratic Party from May to November 1998. Member of Labour Ukraine from April 1999 to March 2001.)	1998	2002	Born 31 August 1966 (age 60)
Donetsk Oblast	No. 63	Anatolii Bohatyrenko	Regional Revival (Note: from May 1998 to May 1999. Member of Labour Ukraine from December 1999 to March 2001.)	1998	2002	Born 28 May 1953 (age 73)
Zhytomyr Oblast	No. 64	Yuriy Yekhanurov	People's Democratic Party	1998	2000	Born 23 August 1948 (age 78)
Zhytomyr Oblast	No. 64	Ihor Bakai	Democratic Union	2000	2002	Born 17 November 1963 (age 62)
Zhytomyr Oblast	No. 65	Mykhailo Kovalko	People's Democratic Party	1994	2002	24 September 1944 – 24 May 2012 (aged 67)
Zhytomyr Oblast	No. 66	Volodymyr Yatsenko	Communist Party of Ukraine	1998	2002	Born 3 April 1951 (age 75)
Zhytomyr Oblast	No. 67	Yurii Spizhenko	Labour Ukraine (Note: Member of the People's Democratic Party from April to October 1998. Member of the Peasant Party of Ukraine from October 1998 to December 1999.)	1994	2002	6 June 1950 – 5 December 2010 (aged 60)
Zhytomyr Oblast	No. 68	Vitaliy Zhuravskyi	Christian-Democratic Party of Ukraine	1998	2002	Born 8 May 1955 (age 71)
Zhytomyr Oblast	No. 69	Viktor Razvadovskyi	Independent	1998	2002	Born 3 June 1959 (age 67)
Zakarpattia Oblast	No. 70	Nestor Shufrych	Social Democratic Party of Ukraine (united)	1998	2002	Born 29 December 1966 (age 59)
Zakarpattia Oblast	No. 71	Hryhoriy Surkis	Social Democratic Party of Ukraine (united)	1998	2002	Born 4 September 1949 (age 77)
Zakarpattia Oblast	No. 72	Miklós Kovács	Party of Hungarians of Ukraine	1998	2002	Born 8 April 1967 (age 59)
Zakarpattia Oblast	No. 73	Viktor Medvedchuk	Social Democratic Party of Ukraine (united)	1997	2002	Born 7 August 1954 (age 72)
Zakarpattia Oblast	No. 74	Viktor Zherdytskyi	Independent	1998	2002	Born 7 December 1957 (age 68)
Zaporizhzhia Oblast	No. 75	Oleksii Baburin	Communist Party of Ukraine	1998	2002	Born 11 January 1949 (age 77)
Zaporizhzhia Oblast	No. 76	Pavlo Baulin	Communist Party of Ukraine	1998	2002	23 November 1948 – 7 June 2015 (aged 66)
Zaporizhzhia Oblast	No. 77	Viktor Ponedilko	Communist Party of Ukraine	1998	2002	Born 22 March 1949 (age 77)
Zaporizhzhia Oblast	No. 78	Oleksandr Kuznietsov	Independent	1998	1998	26 October 1953 – 9 November 1998 (aged 45)
Zaporizhzhia Oblast	No. 78	Yaroslav Sukhyi	Labour Ukraine	2000	2002	Born 26 March 1951 (age 75)
Zaporizhzhia Oblast	No. 79	Volodymyr Arabadzhy	Solidarity (Note: Elected as a member of the Agrarian Party of Ukraine. Member of Hromada from May 1998 to November 1999. Member of the Social Democratic Party (United) from November 1999 to February 2000.)	1998	2002	Born 4 April 1950 (age 76)
Zaporizhzhia Oblast	No. 80	Oleksii Kucherenko	Independent	1998	2002	Born 3 April 1961 (age 65)
Zaporizhzhia Oblast	No. 81	Anatolii Manhul	Independent	1998	2002	Born 24 August 1952 (age 74)
Zaporizhzhia Oblast	No. 82	Anatolii Moroz	Communist Party of Ukraine	1998	2002	Born 30 April 1949 (age 77)
Zaporizhzhia Oblast	No. 83	Anatolii Yermak	National Front	1998	2002	5 August 1955 – 11 February 2003 (aged 47)
Ivano-Frankivsk Oblast	No. 84	Vasyl Kostytskyi	Independent	1994	2002	Born 20 June 1956 (age 70)
Ivano-Frankivsk Oblast	No. 85	Ihor Nasalyk	RAZOM	1998	2002	Born 25 November 1962 (age 63)
Ivano-Frankivsk Oblast	No. 86	Vasyl Tkachuk	Independent	1998	2002	10 December 1933 – 8 May 2015 (aged 81)
Ivano-Frankivsk Oblast	No. 87	Oleh Lytvak	Independent	1998	2002	9 August 1949 – 18 September 2019 (aged 70)
Ivano-Frankivsk Oblast	No. 88	Vasyl Koshchynets	National Front	1998	2002	Born 1 February 1950 (age 76)
Ivano-Frankivsk Oblast	No. 89	Slava Stetsko	National Front	1994	2002	14 May 1920 – 12 March 2003 (aged 82)
Kyiv Oblast	No. 90	Ivan Tkalenko	Regional Revival (Note: Member of the People's Democratic Party from May 1998 to February 1999.)	1998	2002	Born 17 April 1955 (age 71)
Kyiv Oblast	No. 91	Dmytro Tabachnyk	Labour Ukraine	1998	2002	Born 26 November 1963 (age 62)
Kyiv Oblast	No. 92	Oleksandr Moroz	Socialist Party – Peasant Party	1990	2002	Born 29 February 1944 (age 82)
Kyiv Oblast	No. 93	Tetiana Zasukha	Independent	1998	2002	Born 25 April 1964 (age 62)
Kyiv Oblast	No. 94	Yevhen Zhovtiak	People's Movement of Ukraine	1998	2002	Born 19 March 1961 (age 65)
Kyiv Oblast	No. 95	Ivan Kirimov	Independent	1994	2002	Born 21 January 1943 (age 83)
Kyiv Oblast	No. 96	Oleksii Ishchenko	Social Democratic Party of Ukraine (united)	1998	2002	Born 29 September 1951 (age 75)
Kyiv Oblast	No. 97	Oleksandr Abdullin	Democratic Union	1998	2002	Born 29 June 1962 (age 64)
Kirovohrad Oblast	No. 98	Hanna Antonieva	People's Democratic Party	1998	2002	Born 29 August 1961 (age 65)
Kirovohrad Oblast	No. 99	Yulia Tymoshenko	Hromada	1998	2000	Born 27 November 1960 (age 65)
Kirovohrad Oblast	No. 99	Oleksandr Bilovol	Independent	2000	2002	Born 11 January 1962 (age 64)
Kirovohrad Oblast	No. 100	Liudmyla Suprun	People's Democratic Party	1998	2002	Born 7 January 1965 (age 61)
Kirovohrad Oblast	No. 101	Oleh Kukharchuk	People's Democratic Party	1998	1998	2 May 1948 – 8 September 1998 (aged 50)
Kirovohrad Oblast	No. 101	Oleksandr Serhiienko	Independent	1999	2002	Born 19 October 1947 (age 79)
Kirovohrad Oblast	No. 102	Oleksandr Yedin	Labour Ukraine (Note: Member of the People's Democratic Party from May 1998 to April 1999.)	1998	2002	Born 17 May 1960 (age 66)
Luhansk Oblast	No. 103	Oleksandr Borzykh	People's Democratic Party (Note: Member of Regional Revival from April 2001.)	1998	2002	Born 26 May 1950 (age 76)
Luhansk Oblast	No. 104	Fedir Maramzin	Communist Party of Ukraine	1998	2002	Born 16 September 1939 (age 87)
Luhansk Oblast	No. 105	Serhii Hmyria	Communist Party of Ukraine	1998	2002	26 January 1953 – 24 October 2013 (aged 60)
Luhansk Oblast	No. 106	Valerii Kolomoitsev-Rybalka	Agrarian Party of Ukraine	1998	2002	28 November 1964 – 25 July 2009 (aged 44)
Luhansk Oblast	No. 107	Dmytro Petrenko	Communist Party of Ukraine	1998	2002	Born 24 May 1951 (age 75)
Luhansk Oblast	No. 108	Volodymyr Davydov	Batkivshchyna (Note: Member of Hromada from May 1998 to March 1999.)	1998	2002	Born 27 January 1947 (age 79)
Luhansk Oblast	No. 109	Valentyn Yeskov	Communist Party of Ukraine	1998	2002	Born 12 August 1948 (age 78)
Luhansk Oblast	No. 110	Petro Tsybenko	Communist Party of Ukraine	1998	2002	Born 5 June 1949 (age 77)
Luhansk Oblast	No. 111	Yuliy Ioffe	Labour Ukraine (Note: Member of the People's Democratic Party from May to December 1998. Independent from December 1998 to May 1999.)	1990	2002	Born 10 December 1940 (age 85)
Luhansk Oblast	No. 112	Oleksandr Cherenkov	Communist Party of Ukraine	1998	2002	Born 30 September 1954 (age 72)
Luhansk Oblast	No. 113	Yurii Donchenko	Communist Party of Ukraine	1998	2002	Born 18 October 1953 (age 73)
Luhansk Oblast	No. 114	Viktor Berezhnyi	Communist Party of Ukraine	1998	2002	Born 23 February 1947 (age 79)
Lviv Oblast	No. 115	Roman Schmidt	People's Movement of Ukraine	1998	2000	Born 20 April 1951 (age 75)
Lviv Oblast	No. 115	Taras Chornovil	People's Movement of Ukraine	2000	2002	Born 1 June 1964 (age 62)
Lviv Oblast	No. 116	Mykhailo Kosiv	People's Movement of Ukraine	1998	2002	Born 28 December 1934 (age 91)
Lviv Oblast	No. 117	Viktor Pynzenyk	Reforms and Order Party	1992	2002	Born 15 April 1954 (age 72)
Lviv Oblast	No. 118	Yuriy Kryvoruchko	People's Movement of Ukraine	1998	2002	Born 14 July 1966 (age 60)
Lviv Oblast	No. 119	Oleh Tiahnybok	Less Words	1998	2002	Born 7 October 1968 (age 58)
Lviv Oblast	No. 120	Ivan Bilas	National Front	1994	2002	Born 9 May 1953 (age 73)
Lviv Oblast	No. 121	Oleksandr Lavrynovych	People's Movement of Ukraine	1994	2001	Born 28 June 1956 (age 70)
Lviv Oblast	No. 122	Zoryslava Romovska	Reforms and Order Party	1998	2002	Born 18 September 1940 (age 86)
Lviv Oblast	No. 123	Oleksandr Hudyma	People's Movement of Ukraine	1998	2002	Born 26 June 1950 (age 76)
Lviv Oblast	No. 124	Ihor Pylypchuk	National Front	1998	2002	Born 23 April 1961 – 2 May 2009 (aged 48)
Lviv Oblast	No. 125	Orest Furdychko	Independent (Note: Member of the People's Democratic Party until April 1999. Member of Labour Ukraine from April to December 1999. Member of Regional Revival from December 1999 to April 2001 and from November 2001. Member of Democratic Union from April to July 2001.)	1998	2002	Born 10 October 1952 (age 74)
Lviv Oblast	No. 126	Ihor Ostash	Independent	1994	2002	Born 4 August 1959 (age 67)
Mykolaiv Oblast	No. 127	Viktor Horbachov	Independent	1998	2002	23 January 1961 – 30 July 2018 (aged 57)
Mykolaiv Oblast	No. 128	Anatoliy Kinakh	Independent	1998	2001	Born 4 August 1954 (age 72)
Mykolaiv Oblast	No. 129	Serhii Soprun	People's Democratic Party	1998	2002	Born 23 April 1967 (age 59)
Mykolaiv Oblast	No. 130	Oleksii Harkusha	Independent	1998	2000	Born 16 February 1952 (age 74)
Mykolaiv Oblast	No. 130	Pavlo Riabikin	Agrarian Party of Ukraine	2000	2002	Born 6 June 1965 (age 61)
Mykolaiv Oblast	No. 131	Valerii Akopian	Independent	1998	2002	Born 20 July 1958 (age 68)
Mykolaiv Oblast	No. 132	Oleksandr Nastenko	Reforms and Order Party	1998	2002	Born 1 February 1956 (age 70)
Odesa Oblast	No. 133	Viktor Shyshkin	Independent	1998	2002	Born 14 March 1952 (age 74)
Odesa Oblast	No. 134	Yuriy Karmazin	Independent	1998	2002	Born 25 September 1957 (age 69)
Odesa Oblast	No. 135	Serhiy Kivalov	Independent	1998	2002	Born 1 May 1954 (age 72)
Odesa Oblast	No. 136	Eduard Gurvits	Independent	1998	2002	Born 30 January 1948 (age 78)
Odesa Oblast	No. 137	Svitlana Druziuk	Communist Party of Ukraine	1998	2002	Born 2 April 1949 (age 77)
Odesa Oblast	No. 138	Oleksandr Zhovtis	Independent	1998	2002	Born 2 February 1956 (age 70)
Odesa Oblast	No. 139	Yurii Kruk	Independent	1998	2002	Born 2 June 1941 (age 85)
Odesa Oblast	No. 140	Vasyl Tsushko	Socialist Party – Peasant Party	1998	2002	Born 1 February 1963 (age 63)
Odesa Oblast	No. 141	Volodymyr Mazurenko	Independent	1998	2002	Born 1 December 1954 (age 71)
Odesa Oblast	No. 142	Viacheslav Sokerchak	Communist Party of Ukraine	1998	2002	Born 27 January 1947 (age 79)
Odesa Oblast	No. 143	Serhiy Hrynevetskyi	Independent	1998	1999	Born 25 September 1957 (age 69)
Odesa Oblast	No. 143	Vasyl Kalinchuk	Agrarian Party of Ukraine	2000	2002	Born 12 December 1941 (age 84)
Poltava Oblast	No. 144	Leonid Husak	People's Democratic Party	1998	2002	29 August 1939 – 7 March 2017 (aged 77)
Poltava Oblast	No. 145	Oleksandr Kulyk	People's Movement of Ukraine	1998	2002	26 September 1953 – 2 October 2016 (aged 63)
Poltava Oblast	No. 146	Hryhoriy Omelchenko	Independent	1994	2002	Born 4 May 1951 (age 75)
Poltava Oblast	No. 147	Oleksandr Masenko	Communist Party of Ukraine	1994	2002	Born 3 February 1949 (age 77)
Poltava Oblast	No. 148	Mariia Klochko	Communist Party of Ukraine	1998	2002	Born 3 September 1949 (age 77)
Poltava Oblast	No. 149	Kostyantyn Zhevago	Independent (Note: Member of the People's Democratic Party from April to November 1998. Member of Regional Revival from February 1999 to February 2000. Member of the Reforms and Order Party from February 2000 to June 2001.)	1998	2002	Born 7 January 1974 (age 52)
Poltava Oblast	No. 150	Yaroslav Kozak	Regional Revival (Note: Member of Democratic Union from April 2001.)	1998	2002	Born 25 May 1944 (age 82)
Poltava Oblast	No. 151	Mykola Kyrychenko	Communist Party of Ukraine	1998	2002	Born 6 March 1959 (age 67)
Rivne Oblast	No. 152	Pavlo Movchan	People's Movement of Ukraine	1990	2002	Born 15 July 1939 (age 87)
Rivne Oblast	No. 153	Volodymyr Cherniak	People's Movement of Ukraine	1998	2002	26 October 1941 – 18 January 2021 (aged 79)
Rivne Oblast	No. 154	Vitalii Tsekhmistrenko	Reforms and Order Party	1998	2002	Born 1 June 1965 (age 61)
Rivne Oblast	No. 155	Ivan Popliukhovych	People's Movement of Ukraine	1998	2002	Born 11 March 1954 (age 72)
Rivne Oblast	No. 156	Oleksandr Danylchuk	Independent (Note: Member of the People's Democratic Party from April to November 1998. Member of Regional Revival from February 1999 to April 2001. Member of Democratic Union from April 2001.)	1998	2002	Born 17 October 1959 (age 67)
Sumy Oblast	No. 157	Volodymyr Tropin	Communist Party of Ukraine	1998	2002	Born 14 December 1950 (age 75)
Sumy Oblast	No. 158	Valerii Cherep	Social Democratic Party of Ukraine	1990	2002	Born 23 March 1940 (age 86)
Sumy Oblast	No. 159	Andrii Derkach	Labour Ukraine (Note: Member of the Party of Greens of Ukraine from May 1998 to February 1999. Member of Regional Revival from February to April 1999.)	1998	2002	Born 19 August 1967 (age 59)
Sumy Oblast	No. 160	Nataliya Vitrenko	Progressive Socialist Party of Ukraine	1995	2002	Born 28 December 1951 (age 74)
Sumy Oblast	No. 161	Volodymyr Marchenko	Progressive Socialist Party of Ukraine	1990	2002	Born 22 October 1953 (age 73)
Sumy Oblast	No. 162	Hryhorii Dashutin	Labour Ukraine (Note: Member of the Party of Greens of Ukraine from May 1998 to December 1999.)	1998	2002	Born 9 April 1963 (age 63)
Ternopil Oblast	No. 163	Yaroslav Dzhodzhyk	Independent	1998	2002	Born 9 January 1960 (age 66)
Ternopil Oblast	No. 164	Mykhailo Ratushnyi	National Front	1994	2002	Born 18 August 1962 (age 64)
Ternopil Oblast	No. 165	Oleh Ishchenko	People's Movement of Ukraine	1994	2002	Born 10 October 1956 (age 70)
Ternopil Oblast	No. 166	Les Tanyuk	People's Movement of Ukraine	1990	2002	8 July 1938 – 18 March 2016 (aged 77)
Ternopil Oblast	No. 167	Ivan Drach	People's Movement of Ukraine	1998	2000	17 October 1936 – 19 June 2018 (aged 81)
Ternopil Oblast	No. 167	Rostyslav Schiller	Social Democratic Party of Ukraine (united)	2000	2002	Born 8 February 1972 (age 54)
Kharkiv Oblast	No. 168	Volodymyr Semynozhenko	Independent	1998	2001	Born 9 June 1950 (age 76)
Kharkiv Oblast	No. 169	Inna Bohoslovska	Independent	1998	2002	Born 5 August 1960 (age 66)
Kharkiv Oblast	No. 170	Serhii Potimkov	Socialist Party – Peasant Party	1998	2002	Born 11 December 1954 (age 71)
Kharkiv Oblast	No. 171	Vasilii Salyhin	People's Democratic Party	1998	2002	Born 2 June 1957 (age 69)
Kharkiv Oblast	No. 172	Volodymyr Aleksieiev	Progressive Socialist Party of Ukraine	1998	2002	Born 16 October 1953 (age 73)
Kharkiv Oblast	No. 173	Valerii Shmarov	People's Democratic Party	1998	2002	14 August 1945 – 14 October 2018 (aged 73)
Kharkiv Oblast	No. 174	Oleksandr Tishchenko	Communist Party of Ukraine	1998	2002	Born 21 February 1950 (age 76)
Kharkiv Oblast	No. 175	Oleksandr Bandurka	People's Democratic Party	1998	2002	Born 24 April 1937 (age 89)
Kharkiv Oblast	No. 176	Stepan Havrysh	Regional Revival	1998	2002	Born 2 February 1952 (age 74)
Kharkiv Oblast	No. 177	Oleksii Lisohorskyi	Communist Party of Ukraine	1998	2002	Born 17 February 1954 (age 72)
Kharkiv Oblast	No. 178	Valentyna Hoshovska	Independent	1998	2002	Born 19 January 1949 (age 77)
Kharkiv Oblast	No. 179	Ivan Diiak	Independent	1998	2002	Born 22 July 1929 (age 97)
Kharkiv Oblast	No. 180	Vasyl Chahovets	Regional Revival (Note: Member of the People's Democratic Party from May 1998 to February 1999. Member of Democratic Union from April to June 2001.)	1998	2002	Born 6 August 1948 (age 78)
Kharkiv Oblast	No. 181	Yurii Kononenko	People's Democratic Party	1998	2001	15 August 1955 – 22 January 2001 (aged 45)
Kherson Oblast	No. 182	Oleksandr Yeliashkevych	Hromada	1998	2002	Born 29 June 1962 (age 64)
Kherson Oblast	No. 183	Serhii Kyrychenko	Christian-Democratic Party of Ukraine	1998	2002	Born 19 May 1961 (age 65)
Kherson Oblast	No. 184	Leonid Pashkovskyi	Independent (Note: Member of the People's Democratic Party from April to November 1998. Member of Revival of Regions from February 1999 to April 2001. Member of the Democratic Union from April 2001.)	1998	2002	Born 15 August 1959 (age 67)
Kherson Oblast	No. 185	Stanislav Nikolaienko	Socialist Party – Peasant Party	1998	2002	Born 9 February 1956 (age 70)
Kherson Oblast	No. 186	Andrii Snihach	Communist Party of Ukraine	1998	2002	Born 20 June 1948 (age 78)
Kherson Oblast	No. 187	Volodymyr Fialkovskyi	Party of Greens of Ukraine (Note: Member of the Social Democratic Party (United) from February to June 2000. Member of Yabluko in September 2000. Independent from August 1999 to February 2000 and from June to September 2000.)	1998	2002	Born 14 July 1956 (age 70)
Khmelnytskyi Oblast	No. 188	Mykhailo Pavlovskyi	National Front	1994	2002	13 March 1942 – 26 February 2004 (aged 61)
Khmelnytskyi Oblast	No. 189	Volodymyr Bortnyk	Independent	1990	2002	Born 26 January 1949 (age 77)
Khmelnytskyi Oblast	No. 190	Ivan Chyzh	Socialist Party – Peasant Party	1994	2002	Born 1 May 1952 (age 74)
Khmelnytskyi Oblast	No. 191	Adam Chikal	Labour Ukraine (Note: Member of the People's Democratic Party from May to July 1998. Member of "Independence" from July to October 1998. Member of the Peasant Party of Ukraine from October 1998 to November 1999.)	1998	2002	18 March 1947 – 17 July 2020 (aged 73)
Khmelnytskyi Oblast	No. 192	Serhii Tanasov	Communist Party of Ukraine	1998	2002	Born 6 August 1955 (age 71)
Khmelnytskyi Oblast	No. 193	Serhii Buriak	Unity of Oleksandr Omelchenko	1995	2002	Born 1 April 1966 (age 60)
Khmelnytskyi Oblast	No. 194	Volodymyr Nechyporuk	Social Democratic Party of Ukraine (united)	1998	2002	Born 18 January 1949 (age 77)
Cherkasy Oblast	No. 195	Oleksandr Tkachenko	Socialist Party – Peasant Party	1994	2002	Born 7 March 1939 (age 87)
Cherkasy Oblast	No. 196	Olha Yukhymets	Communist Party of Ukraine	1998	2002	Born 10 August 1948 (age 78)
Cherkasy Oblast	No. 197	Serhii Podobiedov	Social Democratic Party of Ukraine (united)	1998	2002	Born 29 June 1956 (age 70)
Cherkasy Oblast	No. 198	Mykhailo Onufriichuk	Independent	1998	2002	15 April 1945 – 27 April 2022 (aged 77)
Cherkasy Oblast	No. 199	Viktor Roienko	Communist Party of Ukraine	1998	2002	Born 8 April 1949 (age 77)
Cherkasy Oblast	No. 200	Mykhailo Syrota	People's Democratic Party	1994	2002	17 July 1956 – 25 August 2008 (aged 52)
Cherkasy Oblast	No. 201	Oleksii Marchenko	Independent (Note: Member of the People's Democratic Party from May 1998 to February 1999. Member of Revival of Regions from February 1999 to April 2001. Member of the Democratic Union from April 2001.)	1998	2002	Born 14 June 1955 (age 71)
Chernivtsi Oblast	No. 202	Viktor Korol	Social Democratic Party of Ukraine (united)	1998	2002	Born 3 March 1948 (age 78)
Chernivtsi Oblast	No. 203	Heorhii Filipchuk	People's Movement of Ukraine	1998	2002	Born 19 December 1950 (age 75)
Chernivtsi Oblast	No. 204	Ion Popescu	Social Democratic Party of Ukraine (united)	1994	2002	Born 16 April 1964 (age 62)
Chernivtsi Oblast	No. 205	Anatolii Korchynskyi	Social Democratic Party of Ukraine (united)	1998	2002	Born 2 October 1952 (age 74)
Chernihiv Oblast	No. 206	Yevhen Ananko	Batkivshchyna	1998	2002	Born 23 February 1958 (age 68)
Chernihiv Oblast	No. 207	Petro Ustenko	Independent (Note: Member of the Reforms and Order Party from December 1998 to April 1999. Member of Labour Ukraine from April 1999 to January 2000. Member of Regional Revival from February 2000 to April 2001. Member of Democratic Union from April to May 2001.)	1998	2002	Born 4 August 1960 (age 66)
Chernihiv Oblast	No. 208	Oleksandr Volkov	Regional Revival	1998	2002	Born 30 April 1948 (age 78)
Chernihiv Oblast	No. 209	Oleksandr Pukhkal	Batkivshchyna	1998	2002	Born 15 October 1948 (age 78)
Chernihiv Oblast	No. 210	Fedir Shpyh	Labour Ukraine (Note: Member of the People's Democratic Party until 1999.)	1998	2002	30 January 1956 – 31 March 2020 (aged 64)
Chernihiv Oblast	No. 211	Oleh Petrov	People's Democratic Party	1998	2002	20 August 1960 – 20 January 2023 (aged 62)
Kyiv	No. 212	Volodymyr Bondarenko	Reforms and Order Party	1996	2002	4 December 1952 – 24 August 2021 (aged 68)
Kyiv	No. 213	Anatolii Mokrousov	Social Democratic Party of Ukraine (united) (Note: Member of Unity of Oleksandr Omelchenko from November 2001.)	1998	2002	14 April 1943 – 9 January 2021 (aged 77)
Kyiv	No. 214	Serhiy Teryokhin	Reforms and Order Party	1994	2002	Born 29 September 1963 (age 63)
Kyiv	No. 215	Mykhailo Brodskyy	Independent	1998	2002	Born 5 April 1959 (age 67)
Kyiv	No. 216	Oleksandr Chubatenko	Independent	1998	2002	Born 11 November 1960 (age 65)
Kyiv	No. 217	Oleksandr Zadorozhnii	Independent (Note: Member of the People's Democratic Party, Regional Revival, Democratic Union, and Unity of Oleksandr Omelchenko.)	1998	2002	26 June 1960 – 12 May 2017 (aged 56)
Kyiv	No. 218	Valeriy Babych	Independent	1994	2002	25 August 1953 – 29 October 2020 (aged 67)
Kyiv	No. 219	Leonid Chernovetskyi	Independent	1996	2002	Born 25 November 1951 (age 74)
Kyiv	No. 220	Oleksandr Slobodian	People's Movement of Ukraine	1998	2002	Born 21 February 1956 (age 70)
Kyiv	No. 221	Ivan Salii	Unity of Oleksandr Omelchenko	2000	2002	2 November 1943 – 26 September 2020 (aged 76)
Kyiv	No. 222	Serhiy Holovatyi	Independent	1990	2002	Born 29 May 1954 (age 72)
Kyiv	No. 223	Leonid Kosakivsky	Independent	1998	2002	Born 21 January 1950 (age 76)
Sevastopol	No. 224	Serhii Kondratevskyi	Soyuz	1998	2002	3 September 1965 – 26 September 2023 (aged 58)
Sevastopol	No. 225	Vadym Zachosov	Communist Party of Ukraine	1998	2002	Born 23 July 1941 (age 85)
