= List of Ukrainian politicians =

A list of notable Ukrainian statesmen and politicians:

== Major statesmen ==
- Dmytro Antonovych, Minister of naval affairs, and of arts of the Ukrainian People's Republic (1917–1918 and 1918/19)
- Mykola Azarov, Prime Minister of Ukraine (2010–2014)
- Volodymyr Bahaziy, the head of Kiev City Administration under German occupation (October 1941 - January 1942)
- Ivan Bahrianyi, President (acting) of the UNR in exile (1965–1967)
- Stepan Bandera, leader of the Organization of Ukrainian Nationalists (OUN-B)
- Oleksander Barvinsky, leader of the Christian Social Movement in Ukraine
- Vyacheslav Chornovil, leader of the People's Movement of Ukraine
- Dmytro Dontsiv, Ukrainian nationalist writer, publisher, journalist and political thinker
- Dmytro Doroshenko, Minister for Foreign Affairs of the Hetmanate (1918)
- Volodymyr Groysman, Prime Minister of Ukraine (2016–2019)
- Sydir Holubovych, Prime Minister of the West Ukrainian National Republic (1919)
- Vsevolod Holubovych, Prime Minister of the Ukrainian People's Republic (1918)
- Volodymyr Horbulin, Secretary of National Security and Defense Council (1994–1999, 2006)
- Mykhaylo Hrushevsky, President of the Ukrainian People's Republic
- Ivan Hrynokh, Vice President of the Ukrainian Supreme Liberation Council
- Stepan Klochurak, Prime Minister of the Hutsul Republic (1919)
- Yevhen Konovalets, leader of the Organization of Ukrainian Nationalists (1929–1938)
- Leonyd Kravchuk, President of Ukraine (1991–1994)
- Volodymyr Kubiyovych, geographer and politician (Ukrainian Central Committee)
- Leonyd Kuchma, President of Ukraine (1994–2005)
- Viktor Kurmanovych, State Secretary of Armed Forces of the West Ukrainian People's Republic (1919)
- Mykola Lebed, the head of the Security Service for the UPA
- Dmytro Levytsky, the head of the Ukrainian National Democratic Alliance (UNDO) (1925–1935)
- Kost Levytsky, Prime Minister of the West Ukrainian National Republic (1918/19)
- Andriy Livytskyi, President of the Ukrainian People's Republic in exile (1926–1954).
- Mykola Livytskyi, President of the Ukrainian People's Republic in exile (1967–1989).
- Vyacheslav Lypynsky, leader of the Ukrainian Democratic-Agrarian Party
- Nestor Makhno, leader of anarchists
- Isaak Mazepa, Prime Minister of the Ukrainian People's Republic (1919–1920 and 1948–1952)
- Andriy Melnyk, leader of the Organization of Ukrainian Nationalists (OUN-M)
- Volodymyr Ohryzko, Minister for Foreign Affairs (2007–2009)
- Symon Petlura, President of the Ukrainian People's Republic
- Yevhen Petrushevych, President of the West Ukrainian National Republic
- Mykola Plaviuk, President of the Ukrainian People's Republic in exile (1989–1992)
- Vyacheslav Prokopovych, Prime Minister of the Ukrainian People's Republic (1920, 1921, 1926–1939)
- Lev Rebet, Acting Prime Minister of the Independent Ukrainian Republic (1941)
- Pavlo Shandruk, the head of the Ukrainian National Committee in Weimar (1945)
- Pavlo Skoropadsky, Hetman of Ukraine or head of the Hetmanate (1918)
- Yaroslav Stetsko, Prime Minister of the Independent Ukrainian Republic (1941)
- Slava Stetsko, leader of the Ukrainian nationalist movement
- Kyryl Studynsky, the head of the People's Assembly of Western Ukraine (1939)
- Borys Tarasyuk, Minister for Foreign Affairs (1998–2000 and 2005–2007)
- Serhiy Tihipko, Minister of Economics (2000)
- Yulia Tymoshenko, Prime Minister of Ukraine (2007–2010)
- Anatole Vakhnianyn, leader of the Christian Social Movement in Ukraine
- Avhustyn Voloshyn, President of Carpatho-Ukraine (1939)
- Volodymyr Vynnychenko, Prime Minister of the Ukrainian People's Republic, writer
- Stepan Vytvytskyi, President of the Ukrainian People's Republic in exile (1954–1965)
- Volodymyr Yaniv, a member of the Ukrainian National Committee in Kraków (1941)
- Arseniy Yatsenyuk, Minister for Foreign Affairs (2007)
- Serhiy Yefremov, the deputy head of the Central Council of Ukraine (1917)
- Viktor Yushchenko, President of Ukraine (2005–2010)
- Viktor Yanukovych, President of Ukraine (2010–2014)
- Oleksandr Turchynov, President of Ukraine (acting) (23 February 2014 – 7 June 2014)
- Petro Poroshenko, President of Ukraine (2014–2019)
- Volodymyr Zelenskyy, President of Ukraine (2019-Present)

== Politicians ==
=== A ===
- Alexander Abdullin
- Alla Aleksandrovska
- Igor Alekseyev (Ukrainian MP)
- Irina Akimova
- Hanna Antonieva
- Vladimir Ar'yev

=== B ===
- Oleh Babayev
- Valery Babenko
- Aleksey Baburin
- Nikolay Bagrayev
- Volodymyr Bahaziy
- Tatyana Bakhteeva
- Viktor Baloha
- Valery Baranov
- Vitaly Barvinenko
- Oleksandr Bazylyuk
- Aleksey Bely
- Irina Belousova
- Irina Berezhna
- Valery Bevz
- Valery Bevzenko
- Roman Bezsmertnyi
- Oksana Bilozir
- Raisa Bogatyrova
- Inna Bohoslovska
- Yevgenia Bosch
- Bohdan Boyko
- Anatolii Brezvin
- Mikhaylo Brodsky
- Sergiy Bubka

=== C ===
- Leonid Chernovetskyi
- Andriy Chornovil
- Taras Chornovil
- Viacheslav Chornovil
- Vlas Chubar

=== D ===
- Lyudmyla Denisova
- Ivan Drach
- Ihor Drizhchany
- Vasyl Durdynets
- Mustafa Dzhemilev

=== F ===
- Vitold Fokin
- Ivan Franko

=== H ===
- Vadym Hetman
- Anatoliy Hrytsenko
- Vasyl Humenyuk

=== K ===
- Nina Karpachova
- Anatoliy Kinakh
- Ivan Kyrylenko
- Vyacheslav Kyrylenko
- Borys Kolesnikov
- Vitaliy Kononov
- Valeriy Konovalyuk
- Dmytro Korchynskyy
- Natalia Korolevska
- Demyan Korotchenko
- Yuriy Kostenko
- Andriy Kozhemiakin
- Leonid Kravchuk
- Leonid Kuchma

=== L ===
- Pavlo Lazarenko
- Levko Lukyanenko
- Yuriy Lutsenko
- Volodymyr Lytvyn

=== M ===
- Volodymyr Marchenko
- Yevhen Marchuk
- Vitaliy Masol
- Viktor Medvedchuk
- Oleksandr Medvedko
- Oleksandr Moroz
- Oleksiy Mustafin

=== N ===
- Yevhen Neronovych
- Andriy Nikolayenko

=== O ===
- Oleksandr Ohloblyn
- Oleksandr Omelchenko

=== P ===
- Oleksandr Pabat
- Andriy Parubiy
- Valeriy Pustovoytenko
- Petro Pysarchuk

=== R ===
- Zoryslava Romovska
- Oleg Ryabokon

=== T ===
- Dmytro Tabachnyk
- Boris Tarasyuk
- Olena Teliha
- Sergei Tigipko
- Yulia Tymoshenko
- Oleksandr Tkachenko
- Mykola Tomenko
- Oleksandr Turchynov
- Oleh Tyahnybok

=== U ===
- Hennadiy Udovenko

=== V ===
- Alina Vedmid
- Nataliya Vitrenko
- Vasil Volga

=== Y ===
- Viktor Yanukovych
- Ihor Yukhnovskyi
- Yuriy Yekhanurov
- Viktor Yushchenko

=== Z ===
- Vitaliy Zholobov
- Oleksandr Zinchenko
- Yukhym Zvyahilsky
