= Yurii Kononenko =

Ukrainian politician and businessman (1955-2001)

- Юрій Кононенко
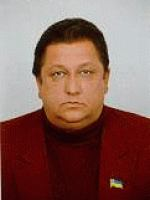
- An official portrait of him from 1998.

People's Deputy of Ukraine
- In office 29 March 1998 – 22 January 2001
- Constituency: Kharkiv Oblast, No. 181

Personal details
- Born: Yurii Savich Kononenko; 15 August 1955 Kharkiv, Ukrainian SSR, Soviet Union
- Died: 22 January 2001 (aged 45) Podvorky (Derhachi Raion), Ukraine
- Party: People's Democratic Party (1998-2001)
- Education: Kharkiv National Automobile and Highway University

Yurii Savich Kononenko (Ukrainian: Юрій Савич Кононенко; 15 August 1955-22 January 2001) was a Ukrainian politician and businessman who served as a People's Deputy of Ukraine in the Verkhovna Rada during the 3rd convocation from 1998 until his death in 2001, mostly with the People's Democratic Party (NDP) faction. As a businessman, he was the chairman of the company "Losk", one of the largest car dealership companies in eastern Ukraine. Kononenko died in the middle of his mandate on 22 January 2001, which led to a number of theories ranging from incitement to suicide, an accident, or just suicide. In June 2001, the case was closed after investigators found he died due to "careless handling of weapons".

== Early life ==
Kononenko was born on 5 August 1955 in the city of Kharkiv, then part of the Ukrainian SSR in the Soviet Union. He was born into a family of employees and has an elder brother who lived in Moscow. After graduating from secondary school, in 1973 he immediately began his career by working as an apprentice turner at the "Radiodetal" plant in Kharkiv, before doing his mandatory military service in the Soviet Army until 1975. Upon returning to Kharkiv in 1976, he started working as a driver for both City Hospital No. 9 and the Transport Enterprise No. 2101. In 1980, he left his job as a driver when he was appointed Director-Administrator of the Ukrainian Department of the Bureau for the Promotion of Cinematic Art of the Union of Cinematographers of the USSR. He did this for another five years, until he became self-employed in 1988.

Later on in 1997, he graduated from the Kharkiv National Automobile and Highway University with a degree in transport management and business and a specialisation as an engineer-economist.

== Business career ==
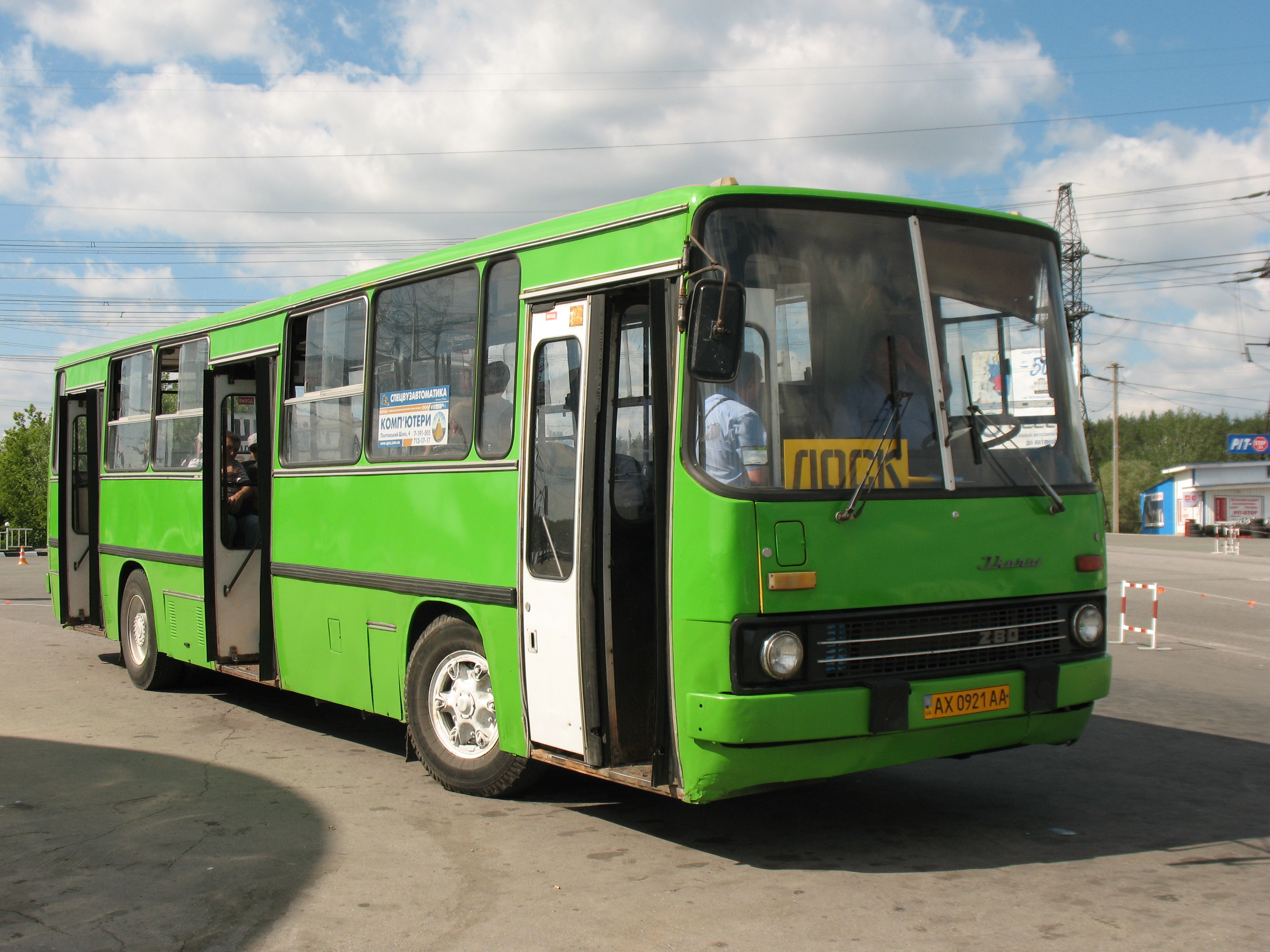
A bus going from Kharkiv to the "Losk" (Лоск) market in Pisochyn.

In 1988, he became chair of the Kharkiv cooperative "Losk", a position he held until shortly after the collapse of the Soviet Union in 1992. After 1992, he became its president when it was privatised. The media outlet Zerkalo Nedeli attributes his breakthrough to 1994, shortly after Leonid Kuchma became President of Ukraine, when at a meeting of directors of the defence-industry enterprises, Kononenko argued that productivity gains could yield large profits. Afterwards, he started to be invited to regional conferences and entrepreneurs' meetings. In 1997, he built a large auto-theatre next to his car market, intending to make it a large concert venue that famous artists like Alla Pugacheva and Michael Jackson could perform at. A year later, he attracted the interest of the British firm Pilkington at a trade fair in Düsseldorf, Germany, in creating a Float glass plant in Ukraine under Losk. At the time, the plant was one of the largest investment projects in Ukraine, costing around $100 million, and also attracted foreign business from British and Italian companies. Three months after the conference, Kononenko met in Sandomierz with Pilkington about the plant, which wished to build the plant in either Moldova or Ukraine. Kononenko also considered working with Finind, an Italian company. After this, Kononenko estimated the plant would produce 15,000 jobs for Kharkiv Oblast. In late 2000, a council for investment in Kharkiv Oblast approved the plant, although others started to say he was refused the rights to implement it. In January 2001, shortly before his death, he met with the Governor of Kharkiv Oblast, Yevhen Kushnaryov, to approve the project, with Kushnarev reportedly being favourable of it and promising support. In addition to the float glass project, it was also reported in 2000 that Kononenko wanted to build an international bus station and was seeking approval from Kharkiv, alongside proposing to extend a line of the Kharkiv Metro to his market at about a cost of $3.5 million. These two projects were reportedly part of a project to build a massive centre with the bus station, metro station, hotel complex, recreation zone, and the car market.

By the time of his death, Losk owned the largest car dealership in both Kharkiv and eastern Ukraine, which was based in the small village of Pisochyn. Losk also owned a glass processing plant that made glass and mirrors for cars and was in cooperation with mining and processing combine of Novoselivka who provided the sand. Lastly, Losk was also a major shareholder in Orion, a Kharkiv-based television company, which was worth $500,000. However, at the same time, it was also reported that Kononenko was in debt to a bank over Losk, although it was not a large debt. Kononenko himself said that after he left the NDP, he faced significant pressure from tax authorities and that he was constantly pressured by tax inspections.

== Political career ==
In 1994, Kononenko attempted to enter politics by running in the 1994 Ukrainian parliamentary election, but lost to Viktor Suslov, an adviser to Leonid Kuchma. After this, he headed the Kharkiv branch of the Liberal Party of Ukraine and helped expand it before leaving and returning to business soon after. Sometime after, he joined the People's Democratic Party of Ukraine (NDP), after finding it through a congress of the "New Ukraine" organisation. In November 1998, he became a member of the Political Council of the NDP. At the same time, he announced his candidacy for the 1998 Ukrainian parliamentary elections, the 3rd convocation of the Verkhovna Rada, for constituency No. 181 (Kharkiv Oblast) as a member of the NDP. Ultimately, he won the election, defeating a candidate who was a member of the Communist Party of Ukraine. Upon joining the Rada, he joined the NDP faction and became a member of the Committee on Economic Policy and later the Committee on Freedom of Speech. During the convocation, Kononenko mainly focused on taxes, submitting numerous bills on it, and wrote drafts on a tax code for Ukraine and a programme for pensioners. He was also the chairman of the Association for Support of Taxpayers of Ukraine outside the Rada. However, in October 2000, he unexpectedly left the NDP, defecting to the minor Party of Free Democrats (or Yabluko) led by Mykhailo Brodskyy, although he only stayed at Yabluko for a bit. According to later interviews, he left NDP due to his anger at the faction leader, Oleksandr Karpov, and due to wanting to create a taxpayers' party. Brodskyy, commenting on the issue, said that Kononenko had joined Yabluko of his own conviction, and told Brodskyy that the governor, Kushnaryov, had reportedly threatened him, although Kushhnarev later denied threatening him. Either way, Kononenko returned to the NDP a few days later in November after joining Yabluko, reportedly asking for forgiveness and affirming his loyal to NDP and Kuchma (NDP was heavily pro-Kuchma). He remained in the NDP faction until his death. Valeriy Pustovoitenko, the leader of the NDP, denied to the media that disagreements over the party and with his fellow MPs had caused Kononenko's death in 2001.

== Personal life ==
He was married to Nadezhda Kononenko, a doctor. They had three young children at the time of his death.

== Death ==
On 22 January 2001, Kononenko was found dead at his office in Losk in the small village of Podvorky, which was just outside both Kharkiv and Pisochyn. According to later accounts, prior to his death, he had a meeting and visited the oblast administration, and afterwards asked an employee of Losk to bring him a Saiga semi-automatic rifle, which was not unusual because he would hunt nearby with his on. At either 12:00 or 19:00, Kononenko was killed by the gun, with his body being found at 20:00 after he did not respond to employees. Reportedly, none of the employees heard the shot because his office had double-armoured doors. The employees found him with a gunshot wound to the left side of his chest, aimed at his heart, which led to the local heads of the Security Service of Ukraine and Interior Ministry of Ukraine coming. The following days, local TV programmes reported that Kononenko had committed suicide, with the Interior Ministry also reporting his death probably was due to careless handling of the weapon. Over the following days, the Prosecutor's Office of Kharkiv Oblast opened a criminal case for systematic persecution in order to investigate his death, with a group being set up for the task. Three main theories were brought forward: suicide, incitement to suicide, and careless handling of a weapon. However, the media also brought forward murder, allegedly due to business motives and his debt, many times because of his apparent lack of motive for suicide.

Other NDP members, like Artur Bilous, said they thought that Kononenko was "stable", with his widow saying that she could not believe he shot himself. However, some employees also said that he seemed depressed, with his widow also saying he seemed in a sad mood prior. Kononenko's brother said he believed in theory about careless handling of weapons, since he had been careless before, but not suicide. The widespread theory about Kushnarev ordering his death was refuted, according to investigators, by numerous witnesses saying the incident had been resolved prior to Kononenko's death. On 25 January, a farewell took place at Losk, attended by more than a thousand people, including local politicians like Kushnarev, Mykhaylo Pylypchuk, and Volodymyr Semynozhenko. Kononenko was ultimately buried in Liubotyn by his father. On 6 February 2001, the Verkhovna Rada terminated his powers due to his death, and in June 2001 the case was closed on his death with investigators determining that Kononenko had fired the gun by accident when he held the muzzle towards himself. His relatives did not contest the finding.
