= Overthrow of Viktor Yanukovych =

Overthrow of Viktor Yanukovych may refer to:

- 2014 Ukrainian revolution, where president Viktor Yanukovych was ousted
- Orange Revolution of 2004–2005, where president-elect Viktor Yanukovych's electoral victory was nullified

== See also ==
- Viktor Yanukovych
- Politics of Ukraine
