= Stepan Havrysh =

Ukrainian politician (born 1952)

- Степан Гавриш
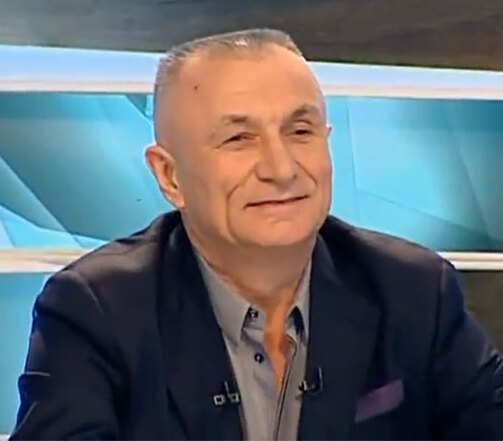
- Havrysh in 2013

Deputy Chairman of the Verkhovna Rada
- In office 1 February 2000 – 4 April 2002
- Preceded by: Viktor Medvedchuk
- Succeeded by: Oleksandr Zinchenko

Personal details
- Born: Stepan Bohdanovich Havrysh; 2 January 1952 (age 74) Oleshív, Tlumatsky, Stanislav Oblast, Ukrainian SSR, Soviet Union
- Occupation: Politician

Stepan Bohdanovich Havrysh (Ukrainian: Степан Богданович Гавриш; born 2 January 1952) is a Ukrainian politician, Doctor of Law (1994), Professor of the National Law Academy, Academician of the National Academy of Legal Sciences of Ukraine (2004), Honoured Lawyer of Ukraine (2003); People's Deputy of Ukraine III and IV convocations.

== Career ==
In 1998, he was elected People's Deputy of Ukraine for Chuhuiv Electoral District No. 176 (40% of votes, 18 applicants). He served as leader of the deputy group "Revival of the Regions".

From 2000–2002 he was Deputy Chairman of the Verkhovna Rada of Ukraine;

He served as Head of the Temporary Special Commission for the consideration of draft laws on amendments to the Constitution of Ukraine based on the results of the All-Ukrainian referendum on people's initiative (2001).

In 2002, he was elected a People's Deputy of Ukraine for the Chuhuiv Electoral District No. 177 (64% of votes, 4 candidates).

He was a coordinator of the permanent parliamentary majority in the Verkhovna Rada of Ukraine, leader of the deputy group "Democratic Initiatives", member of the committee of the Verkhovna Rada of Ukraine on the fuel and energy complex, nuclear policy and nuclear safety.

He was a co-chairman of the Temporary Special Commission of the Verkhovna Rada of Ukraine on drafting amendments to the Constitution of Ukraine (2002).

In 2004–2010, Havrysh was a member of the Supreme Council of Justice.

=== Other activities ===
- President of the All-Ukrainian public organization "Association of Taxpayers of Ukraine" (1998-2005)
- President of the Children's Charitable Foundation "Coast of Hope" (since 2000)
- Chairman of the Board of the International Public Organization "Kharkiv Community" (since 2000)
- Chairman of the Union of Citizens' Associations "Public Expert Council on Legislation" (since 2002)
- Chairman of the Kharkiv Regional Organization of the Cultural Foundation of Ukraine (since 2002)
- Member of the Board of the Ministry of Fuel and Energy of Ukraine (since 2003)
- Member of the Governmental Committee for Economic Development and European Integration (since 2003)
- Member of the High Council of Justice (2004–2010)
- Member of the supervisory board of SC "Ukrekokomresursy" (since 2004)
