= Pisochyn =

Rural locality in Kharkiv Oblast, Ukraine

Pisochyn Пісочин
- Rural settlement
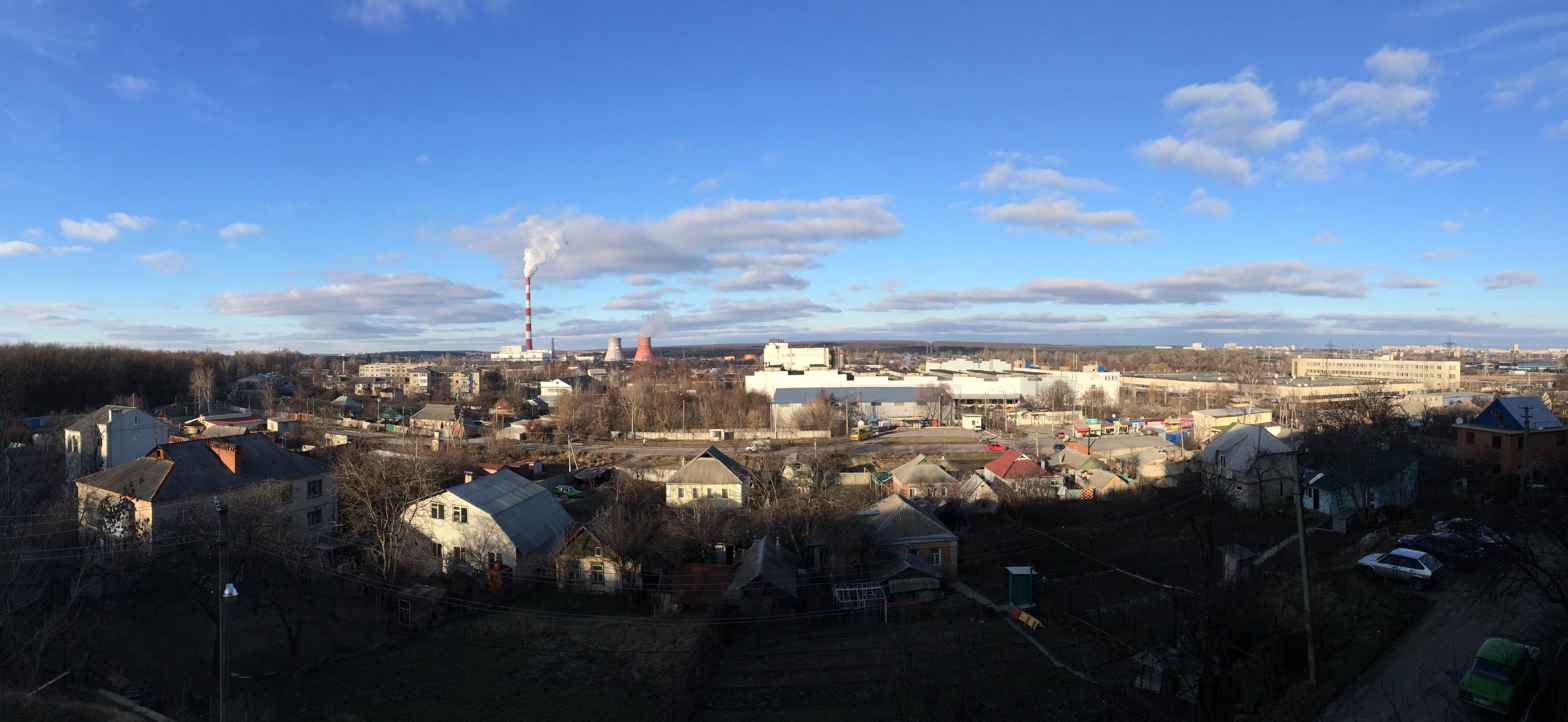
- General view of Pisochyn

- Flag Coat of arms

- Location in Kharkiv Oblast Location in Ukraine
- Coordinates: 49°57′34″N 36°06′39″E
- Country: Ukraine
- Oblast: Kharkiv Oblast
- Raion: Kharkiv Raion

Population (2022)
  - Total: 23,509
- Time zone: UTC+2 (EET)
  - Summer (DST): UTC+3 (EEST)

Pisochyn (Ukrainian: Пісочин, Russian: Песочин) is a rural settlement in Kharkiv Raion of Kharkiv Oblast in Ukraine. It is essentially a western suburb of the city of Kharkiv. Pisochyn hosts the administration of Pisochyn settlement hromada, one of the hromadas of Ukraine. Population: 23,509 (2022 estimate).

Until 26 January 2024, Pisochyn was designated urban-type settlement. On this day, a new law entered into force which abolished this status, and Pisochyn became a rural settlement.

== Economy ==
=== Transportation ===
Pisochyn and Ryzhov railway stations are on the railway connecting Kharkiv and Poltava. There is local passenger traffic.

The settlement is included in the road network of Kharkiv urban agglomeration. In particular, the eastern boundary of Pisochyn is the Kharkiv Ring Road.
