= Politics of Ukraine =

Politics of Ukraine Державний лад України (Ukrainian) Derzhavnyi lad Ukrainy (Romanization)
- Polity type: Unitary semi-presidential constitutional republic
- Constitution: Constitution of Ukraine
- Formation: 24 August 1991 (independence) 28 June 1996 (constitution in force)

Legislative branch
- Name: Verkhovna Rada
- Type: Unicameral
- Meeting place: Verkhovna Rada Building, Kyiv

Executive branch
- Head of state
- Title: President
- Currently: Volodymyr Zelenskyy
- Appointer: Direct popular vote
- Head of government
- Title: Prime Minister
- Currently: Sergii Koretskyi
- Appointer: Verkhovna Rada
- Cabinet
- Name: Government of Ukraine
- Current cabinet: Koretskyi Government
- Appointer: Verkhovna Rada
- Ministries: 19

Judicial branch
- Name: Judiciary of Ukraine
- Constitutional Court
- Chief judge: Nataliya Shaptala
- Seat: 14 Zhylianska St., Kyiv
- Supreme Court
- Chief judge: Yaroslav Romanyuk

The politics of Ukraine take place in a framework of a semi-presidential republic and a multi-party system. A Cabinet of Ministers exercises executive power (jointly with the president until 1996). Legislative power is vested in Ukraine's parliament, the Verkhovna Rada (Ukrainian: Верховна Рада, lit. 'Supreme Council').

As part of the Soviet Union as the Ukrainian Soviet Socialist Republic until 1991, the political system featured a single-party socialist-republic framework characterized by the superior role of the Communist Party of Ukraine (CPU), the sole-governing party then permitted by the Ukrainian SSR's constitution. In 1996, the current constitution replaced the previous constitution that was introduced in 1978.

The condemned Russian annexations of Crimea in 2014 and of Donetsk and Luhansk in 2022 have complicated the de facto political situation associated with those areas.

== Constitution and fundamental freedoms ==
Shortly after becoming independent in 1991, Ukraine named a parliamentary commission to prepare a new constitution, adopted a multi-party system, and adopted legislative guarantees of civil and political rights for national minorities. A new, democratic constitution was adopted on 28 June 1996, which mandates a pluralistic political system with protection of basic human rights and liberties, and a semi-presidential form of government.

The Constitution was amended in December 2004 to ease the resolution of the 2004 presidential election crisis. The consociationalist agreement transformed the form of government in a semi-presidentialism in which the president of Ukraine had to cohabit with a powerful prime minister. The Constitutional Amendments took force between January and May 2006.

The Constitutional Court of Ukraine in October 2010 overturned the 2004 amendments, considering them unconstitutional. On 18 November 2010, The Venice Commission published its report titled The Opinion of the Constitutional Situation in Ukraine in Review of the Judgement of Ukraine's Constitutional Court, in which it stated "It also considers highly unusual that far-reaching constitutional amendments, including the change of the political system of the country - from a parliamentary system to a parliamentary presidential one - are declared unconstitutional by a decision of the Constitutional Court after a period of 6 years. ... As Constitutional Courts are bound by the Constitution and do not stand above it, such decisions raise important questions of democratic legitimacy and the rule of law".

On 21 February 2014, the parliament passed a law that reinstated the 8 December 2004 amendments of the constitution. This was passed under simplified procedure without any decision of the relevant committee and was passed in the first and the second reading in one voting by 386 deputies. The law was approved by 140 MPs of the Party of Regions, 89 MPs of Batkivshchyna, 40 MPs of UDAR, 32 of the Communist Party, and 50 independent lawmakers. According to Radio Free Europe, however, the measure was not signed by the then-president Viktor Yanukovych, who was subsequently removed from office. On 21 February 2019, the Constitution of Ukraine was amended to enshrine the norms on the strategic course of Ukraine for membership in the European Union and NATO in the preamble of the Basic Law, three articles and transitional provisions. On 3 September 2019, new amendments to the Constitution were passed which abolished the parliamentary immunity for the deputies of the Verkhovna Rada, with the exception that they were immune for the results of voting or their statements in the parliament, but they are liable for insult or defamation. New revision came into force on 1 January 2020.

=== Fundamental Freedoms and basic elements of constitutional system ===
Article 1 of the Constitution establishes Ukraine as a sovereign and independent, democratic, social, law-based state.

Article 5 of the Constitution defines Ukraine as a republic. The people are the bearer of sovereignty and the sole source of power in Ukraine, and exercise power directly and through the government authorities and local government. No one must usurp state power.

Article 15 of the Constitution states that social life in Ukraine must be based on the principles of political, economic, and ideological diversity. No ideology is recognised as mandatory by the State. Censorship is prohibited. The State guarantees the freedom of political activities not prohibited by the Constitution and the laws of Ukraine.

Freedom of religion is guaranteed by law, although religious organizations are required to register with local authorities and with the central government. Article 35 of the Constitution defines that no religion may be recognized by the state as mandatory, while church and religious organizations in Ukraine are separated from the state.

Minority rights are respected in accordance with a 1991 law guaranteeing ethnic minorities the right to schools, educational buildings, and cultural facilities and the use of national languages in conducting personal business. 11 Article of the Constitution states that State must promote the consolidation and development of the Ukrainian nation, its historical consciousness, traditions, and culture, as well as the development of ethnic, cultural, linguistic, and religious identity of all indigenous peoples and national minorities of Ukraine.

According to Article 10 of Ukrainian constitution, Ukrainian is the only official state language. However, in Crimea and some parts of eastern Ukraine – areas which also include substantial ethnic Russian minorities – the use of Russian is widespread.

Freedom of speech and press are guaranteed by law, but authorities sometimes interfere with the news media through different forms of pressure (see Freedom of the press in Ukraine). In particular, the failure of the government to conduct a thorough, credible, and transparent investigation into the 2000 disappearance and murder of independent journalist Georgiy Gongadze has had a negative effect on Ukraine's international image. Over half of Ukrainians polled by the Razumkov Center in early October 2010 (56.6%) believed political censorship existed in Ukraine.

Official labor unions have been grouped under the Federation of Labor Unions. A number of independent unions, which emerged in 1992, among them the Independent Union of Miners of Ukraine, have formed the Consultative Council of Free Labor Unions. While the right to strike is legally guaranteed by the Constitution, strikes based solely on political demands are prohibited.

Article 157 of the Constitution prohibits amendments to the Constitution of Ukraine "under conditions of martial law or a state of emergency." Elections, referendums, strikes, mass gatherings and protests are prohibited during martial law.

== Executive branch ==
Main office-holders
Office	Name	Party	Since
President	Volodymyr Zelenskyy	Servant of the People	20 May 2019
Prime Minister	Serhii Koretskyi	Independent	17 July 2025

The president is elected by popular vote for a five-year term. The president nominates the prime minister, who must be confirmed by parliament. The prime minister and cabinet are de jure appointed by the Parliament on submission of the president and prime minister, respectively. Pursuant to Article 114 of the Constitution of Ukraine.

== Legislative branch ==
The Verkhovna Rada (Parliament of Ukraine) has 450 members, elected for a five-year term. Prior to 2006, half of the members were elected by proportional representation, and the other half by single-seat constituencies. In the 2006 and 2007 Ukrainian parliamentary elections, all 450 members of the Verkhovna Rada were elected by party-list proportional representation, but the system returned to parallel voting in 2012. In 2019 the Electoral Code was adopted, according to which, all members of parliament will be elected exclusively on open party lists.

The Verkhovna Rada initiates legislation, ratifies international agreements, and approves the budget.

== Political parties and elections ==
Ukrainian parties tend not to have clear-cut ideologies but are incline to centre around civilizational and geostrategic orientations (rather than economic and socio-political agendas, as in Western politics), around personalities and business interests.

Party membership is lower than 1% of the population eligible to vote (compared to an average of 4.7% in the European Union).

== Judicial branch ==
constitutional jurisdiction:

- the Constitutional Court of Ukraine.

general jurisdiction:

Laws, acts of the parliament and the Cabinet, presidential edicts, and acts of the Crimean parliament (Autonomous Republic of Crimea) may be nullified by the Constitutional Court of Ukraine when they are found to violate the Constitution of Ukraine. Other normative acts are subject to judicial review. The Supreme Court of Ukraine is the main body in the system of courts of general jurisdiction.

The Constitution of Ukraine provides for trials by jury. This has not yet been implemented in practice. Moreover, some courts provided for by legislation as still in project, as is the case for, e.g., the Court of Appeals of Ukraine. The reform of the judicial branch is presently underway. Important is also the Office of the Prosecutor General of Ukraine, granted the broad rights of control and supervision.

== Administrative divisions ==
Ukraine is divided into 24 oblasts (regions). Each oblast is divided into raions (districts). The current administrative divisions remain the same as the local administrations of Soviet Ukraine. The heads of the oblasts and raions are appointed and dismissed by the president of Ukraine. They serve as representatives of the central government in Kyiv. They govern over locally elected assemblies. This system encourages regional elites to compete fiercely for control over the central government and the position of the president.

== Autonomous Republic of Crimea ==
In 1992, a number of pro-Russian political organizations in Crimea advocated the secession of Crimea and annexation into Russia. During USSR times Crimea was ceded from Russia to Ukraine in 1954 by First Secretary Nikita Khrushchev to mark the 300th anniversary of the Treaty of Pereyaslav. In July 1992, the Crimean and Ukrainian parliaments determined that Crimea would remain under Ukrainian jurisdiction while retaining significant cultural and economic autonomy, thus creating the Autonomous Republic of Crimea.

The Crimean peninsula—while under Ukrainian sovereignty, served as a site for major military bases of both Ukrainian and Russian forces, and was heavily populated by ethnic Russians.

In early 2014, Ukraine's pro-Russian president, Viktor Yanukovych, was ousted by Ukrainians over his refusal to ally Ukraine with the European Union, rather than Russia. In response, Russia invaded Crimea in February 2014 and occupied it.

In March 2014, during occupation a controversial referendum was held in Crimea with 97% of voters backing joining Russia.

On 18 March 2014, Russia and the new, self-proclaimed Republic of Crimea signed a treaty of accession of the Republic of Crimea and Sevastopol in the Russian Federation. In response, the UN General Assembly passed non-binding resolution 68/262 declaring the referendum invalid and officially supporting Ukraine's claim to Crimea. Although Russia administers the peninsula as two federal subjects, Ukraine and the majority of countries do not recognise Russia's annexation.

== Opinion polls ==
A 2026 Socis opinion polls found the main issues according to Ukrainians were corruption, drone and missile attacks, and standard of living.

== See also ==
- List of Ukrainian politicians
- Declaration of Independence
- Proclamation of Independence
- Corruption in Ukraine
- Cassette Scandal
- Ukraine without Kuchma
- Orange Revolution
- Russia-Ukraine gas dispute
- Universal of National Unity
- 2007 Ukrainian political crisis
- Ukraine–European Union relations
- Ukraine–NATO relations
- Ukrainian nationalism
