= Serhii Kondratevskyi =

Ukrainian politician (1965–2023)

- Сергій Кондратевський
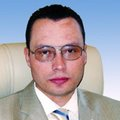

People's Deputy of Ukraine
- In office 12 May 1998 – 14 May 2002

Personal details
- Born: Serhii Mykhailovych Kondratevskyi; 3 September 1965 Sheptaky, Novhorod-Siverskyi Raion, Chernihiv Oblast, Ukrainian SSR, USSR
- Died: 26 September 2023 (aged 58)
- Party: Soyuz
- Education: Kharkiv State Academy of Culture
- Occupation: Businessman

Serhii Mykhailovych Kondratevskyi (Ukrainian: Сергі́й Миха́йлович Кондрате́вський; 3 September 1965 – 26 September 2023) was a Ukrainian businessman and politician. A member of Soyuz, he served in the Verkhovna Rada from 1998 to 2002.

Kondratevskyi died on 26 September 2023, at the age of 58.
