= Larysa Trofymenko =

Ukrainian politician (born 1950)

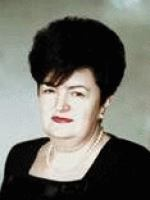
Larysa Trofymenko

Larysa Serhiivna Trofymenko (Ukrainian: Лариса Сергіївна Трофименко; born 15 February 1950) is a former Soviet and Ukrainian politician. She served as a member of the Verkhovna Rada of Ukraine of the 3rd convocation (1998–2002).

== Early life and education ==
Larysa Trofymenko was born on 15 February 1950 in the village of Hruzske, Kryvyi Rih district, Dnipropetrovsk Oblast (some sources indicate Kryvyi Rih as her birthplace). Her father, Serhii Mykolaiovych Hrechka (1918–1975), was a teacher; her mother, Liudmyla Akimivna (born 1927), is a pensioner. She has a daughter, Maryna (born 1979).

She graduated from Simferopol State University in 1972 with a degree in Ukrainian language and literature. Later, she studied agronomy at Dnipropetrovsk Agricultural Institute, graduating in 1987.

In 2002, she defended a dissertation at the Odesa National Law Academy on the topic “The phenomenon of women’s political leadership in Ukraine” and obtained the degree of Candidate of Political Sciences.

== Career ==
From 1972 to 1973 Larysa Trofymenko worked as a teacher of Ukrainian language and literature at School No. 2 in Kadiivka, Luhansk Oblast. In 1974–1975 she was an organizer of extracurricular activities at School No. 7 in Kharkiv. Between 1975 and 1982 she served as principal of schools in Novolozuvate and Lozuvate (Kryvyi Rih district).

In 1982 she became deputy chair of the executive committee of the Kryvyi Rih district council, later serving as its chair (1987–1992). From 1992 to 1994 she was the representative of the President of Ukraine in Kryvyi Rih district. She subsequently headed the Kryvyi Rih district council until 1995.

Trofymenko was chair of the Kryvyi Rih district state administration (1995–1997) and again chair of the district council (1997–1998).

== Political activity ==
In 1998 Larysa Trofymenko was elected to the Verkhovna Rada of Ukraine of the 3rd convocation from electoral district No. 37 (Dnipropetrovsk Oblast) as a candidate of the All-Ukrainian Association “Hromada.”

She was a member of the Hromada faction (1998–1999), the “Independents” group (1999–2000), the “Revival of the Regions” group (2000–2001), and the Democratic Union Party faction (from April 2001). She served on several parliamentary committees, including those on parliamentary procedure and ethics, social policy and labor, and agrarian policy and land relations.

From November 1999 she was deputy chair of the political party Solidarity of Ukrainian Women.

In the 2002 parliamentary elections she again ran in district No. 37 but was not elected.

== Later life ==
After leaving politics, Larysa Trofymenko turned to private entrepreneurial activity.

== Awards and recognition ==
- Honored Education Worker of Ukraine
- Orders of Princess Olga, 2nd and 3rd class
- “Honorary Cross” of the International Economic Rating organization
- Honorary diplomas of the Verkhovna Rada of Ukraine
- Laureate of the All-Ukrainian Award “Woman of the Third Millennium” (2008), in the “Rating” category
- Honorary citizen of Kryvyi Rih district
