= Alina Vedmid =

Ukrainian politician (1940–2008)

- Аліна Ведмідь
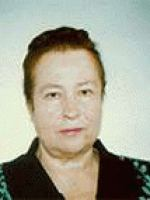
- Vedmid in 1998

People's Deputy of Ukraine

3rd convocation
- In office 12 May 1998 – 14 May 2002

People's Deputy of the Congress of People's Deputies of the Soviet Union
- In office 1989–1991

Personal details
- Born: Alina Petrovna Vedmid; 28 June 1940 Saliv Khutir, Myronivka Raion, Kyiv Oblast, Ukrainian SSR
- Died: 4 September 2008 (aged 68) Salivonki, Vasylkiv Raion, Kyiv Oblast, Ukraine
- Cause of death: Pedestrian road incident
- Party: Communist Party of the Soviet Union; Communist Party of Ukraine
- Spouse: Anatoly Panasovich Vedmid (died)
- Children: 2
- Education: Ukrainian Agricultural Academy
- Occupation: Agronomist; Politician
- Awards: Order of the Badge of Honour; Hero of Socialist Labour; Order of Lenin "Hammer and Sickle" gold medal

Alina Petrovna Vedmid (Ukrainian: Аліна Петрівна Ведмідь; 28 June 1940 – 4 September 2008) was a Ukrainian politician and agronomist who was head of the "Zorya" collective farm in the Kyiv Oblast. She worked at the Peremoga collective farm in the Bohuslav Raion and was a laboratory assistant, technician-economist, engineer-economist at the Ukrainian Machine Testing Station. Vedmid was an economist and later chief economist of the collective farm "Dawn of Communism" in the Vasylkiv Raion. She was an elected deputy of the Supreme Soviet of the Ukrainian Soviet Socialist Republic that lasted from 1984 to 1989 and in the Congress of People's Deputies of the Soviet Union between 1989 and 1991 and in the third convocation of the Verkhovna Rada of Ukraine from 1998 to 2002. Vedmid was decorated with the Order of the Badge of Honour and the title of Hero of Socialist Labour with the Order of Lenin award and the "Hammer and Sickle" gold medal.

== Biography ==
On 28 June 1940, Vedmid was born to the electrician Pyotr Ivanovich Khilko and the cleaner Magi Maria Romanovna in the village of Saliv Khutor, Myronivka Raion, Kyiv Oblast, Ukrainian SSR. Following her graduation from school in 1957 to 1959, she worked as an agronomist at the Peremoga collective farm in the Bohuslav Raion, Kyiv Oblast and then worked as a labour training teacher at the Salivonkovsky Secondary School in the Vasylkiv Raion, Kyiv Oblast between 1959 and 1961. Vedmid went on to become a laboratory assistant, technician-economist, engineer-economist at the Ukrainian Machine Testing Station, from 1961 to 1967.

She graduated from the Ukrainian Agricultural Academy (today the National University of Life and Environmental Sciences of Ukraine) in absentia with a degree in agronomics in 1967. Vedmid was an economist and later chief economist of the collective farm "Dawn of Communism" in the village of Salivonki, Vasylkiv Raion from 1967 to 1977. In 1977, she became the head of one of the largest farms in the Kyiv Oblast and became the chairperson of the board of the "Zorya" collective farm. The farm had up to 7,000 hectares (17,000 acres) of land and Vedmid sold 11 to 13 thousand tonnes of grain, 50 to 55 thousand tons of sugar beet (with an average yield of more than 500 centners per hectare) every year. It specialised in the cultivation of cattle and this enabled the farm to retain simultaneously more than 10,000 heads of young animals. 10,000 t (11,000 tons) of high-quality, cheap beef was shipped to the Darnytsky Meat Processing Plant, Kyiv Oblast and the village became gassified and saw telephone systems installed. In 1992, the farm became the agricultural production cooperative "Agrofirma" Zarya ", with Vedmid remaining its chairperson until March 1998 when she entered political office. She returned to the post upon leaving politics.

Vedmid became a member of the Communist Party of the Soviet Union in 1961. She served as an elected deputy at all levels such as at the village, district, regional council levels. Vedmid was a deputy from the No. 320 Obukhov constituency of the eleventh convocation of the Supreme Soviet of the Ukrainian Soviet Socialist Republic that lasted from 1984 to 1989. Between 1989 and 1991, she served as a deputy of the Congress of People's Deputies of the Soviet Union from women's councils united by the Committee of Soviet Women, where she was on the Commission Issues of Labour, Prices and Social Policy. From 12 May 1998 to 14 May 2002, Vedmid served as a deputy of the third convocation of the Verkhovna Rada of Ukraine, having been elected from the list of the Communist Party of Ukraine. She was a member of the Committee on Social Policy and Labour. Vedmid was a member of the Presidium of the Women's Union of Ukraine, and a member of the Supreme Council of the All-Ukrainian Union "Working Women for the Future of Children of Ukraine". She unsuccessfully ran for reelection to the Verkhovna Rada as a member of the list of the Communist Party of Ukraine at the 2006 Ukrainian parliamentary election.

== Personal life and death ==
Vedmid was married to Anatoly Panasovich Vedmid until his death in 1981. They had two children. On the morning of 4 September 2008, she had left her house and was crossing a road on Highway M05 to a car in the village of Salivonki, Vasylkiv Raion when a motorist struck her at high speed. The injuries she sustained resulted in her death at the scene prior to the arrival of an ambulance. The driver who caused her accident said they were blinded by the morning sun and was placed under arrest. Their car was impounded.

== Awards ==
She was decorated with the Order of the Badge of Honour on 24 December 1976. Mikhail Gorbachev, the President of the Soviet Union, issued a decree conferring Vedmid the title of Hero of Socialist Labour with the Order of Lenin award and the "Hammer and Sickle" gold medal on 7 June 1990.
