= Volodymyr Matvieiev =

Ukrainian politician (1943–2024)

- Володимир Матвєєв
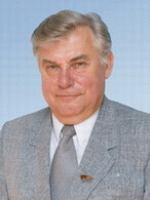
- Matvieiev in 2007

People's Deputy of Ukraine
- In office 23 November 2007 – 12 December 2012
- In office 12 May 1998 – 25 May 2006
- In office 10 May 1990 – 10 May 1994

Personal details
- Born: Volodymyr Yosypovich Matvieiev; 24 July 1943 Vladivostok, Russian SFSR, USSR
- Died: 5 November 2024 (aged 81) Mykolaiv, Ukraine
- Party: KPU
- Education: Mykolaiv Shipbuilding Institute; Higher Political School of the Central Committee of the Communist Party of Ukraine
- Occupation: Military officer

Volodymyr Matvieiev (Ukrainian: Володимир Йосипович Матвєєв; 24 July 1943 – 5 November 2024) was a Ukrainian military officer and politician. A member of the Communist Party of Ukraine, he served in the Verkhovna Rada from 1990 to 1994, 1998 to 2006, and 2007 to 2012.

Matvieiev died in Mykolaiv on 5 November 2024, at the age of 81.
