= Party of Free Democrats =

Political party in Ukraine

Party of Free Democrats Партія вільних демократів
- Leader: Mykhailo Brodskyy
- Registered: November 1999
- Split from: Hromada; Batkivshchyna
- Merged into: Batkivshchyna (2005–2007)
- Membership: 1,000
- Verkhovna Rada: 0 / 450

Website
- pvd.ck.ua (Archived)

The Party of Free Democrats (Ukrainian: Партія вільних демократів, romanized: Partiia vilnykh demokrativ) is a political party in Ukraine led by Mykhailo Brodskyy. It was registered in November 1999 as Yabluko (Ukrainian: Яблуко; Apple). The party has about 1,000 members.

== History ==
Mykhailo Brodskyy, a member of the Hromada faction, formed a 14-member "Yabluko" faction in the Verkhovna Rada (Ukrainian parliament) in mid-September 2000.

During the 2002 Ukrainian parliamentary election, the party won 1.2% of the popular vote and no seats (as Yabluko).

In March 2005, the party was merged into the Batkivshchyna party, led by Yulia Tymoshenko. In March 2007, however, Brodskyy announced the renewal of the party; renaming it to the Party of Free Democrats.

During the 2007 Ukrainian parliamentary election, the party failed again to win parliamentary representation.

In late October 2009, The party nominated Brodskyy as its candidate for President of Ukraine in the 2010 Ukrainian presidential election.

During the 2010 Ukrainian local elections, the party won representatives in municipalities and did particularly well in Cherkasy. The party won one representative in the Cherkasy Oblast Council and 14 seats in the city council of Cherkasy.

In the 2012 Ukrainian parliamentary election the party competed in one constituency; as it was defeated, the party continued to lack parliamentary representation.

The party did not participate in the 2014 Ukrainian parliamentary election. In the 2019 Ukrainian parliamentary election the party had two candidates in constituencies, but both lost.

== See also ==
- Yulia Tymoshenko Bloc
- Yabloko
