= Fedir Abramov =

Ukrainian geologist and mining specialist

- Федір Олексійович Абрамов
- Born: February 21, 1904; Lysychansk, Imperial Russia
- Died: December 5, 1982 (aged 78); Dnipropetrovsk, Ukrainian SSR, Soviet Union
- Education: Dnepropetrovsk Mining Institute
- Occupations: Miner and geologist
- Scientific career
- Workplaces: Institute of Geotechnical Mechanics and National Mining University

Fedir Abramov (March 21, 1904 in Lysychansk – December 5, 1982 in Dnipropetrovsk) was a Ukrainian geologist and mining specialist. He was a member of the Academy of Sciences of the Ukrainian SSR. His works dealt with problems of ventilation and aerogas dynamics of mines, and the prevention of sudden emissions of coal, rock and gas.

== Biography ==
In 1930, he graduated from the Dnepropetrovsk Mining Institute, where he would later return as a teacher. He participated in the Second World War.

From 1940 to 1969, with a break from 1941 to 1944, Abramov headed the Department of Aerology and Occupational Safety of the National Mining University.

In 1952, he defended his doctoral dissertation, which was devoted to the study of aerodynamics of vertical shafts of mines with new types of reinforcement.

In 1962, he began working at the Institute of Geotechnical Mechanics of the USSR Academy of Sciences.

Until 1982 he headed the department of mine aerogas and thermodynamics of the Institute of Geotechnical Mechanics.

== Research and Innovations ==
His department developed the techniques needed for the rapid construction of the Moscow metro in the 1950s.

He supervised the research covered in the "Handbook of Mine Ventilation", with a creative team that included OS Gershun, BE Gretzinger, VA Dolinsky, AF Miletich, LP Romensky, V. E. Streimann, MV Shibka, GA Shevelev.

He founded a pioneering scientific school in mine ventilation and was the first in the USSR to demonstrate both technically and economically the use of individual fasteners for face support in Donbas coal mines. He also developed the control‑depressive survey method for mine and quarry ventilation, introduced the wedge principle for extracting metal risers in Donbas workings, and helped design a series of industry‑implemented modeling devices.

Under his leadership:

- created aerodynamic means of regulating air flow at production sites,
- mathematical substantiation of transient aerogas-dynamic processes is carried out,
- developed algorithms and programs for calculating mine ventilation,
- the theoretical bases of electric modeling of mine ventilation networks are laid.

He was awarded the Order of Lenin, orders and medals, the State Prize of the USSR in 1976 - for the development and implementation of methods for overcoming the gas barrier, which provides a heavily polluted mines lava load of more than 1,000 tons per day.

His inventions "Method of measuring methane flow rates from degassing wells" were registered in co-authorship with Frundin, "Intrinsically safe methanometer with a unified output".
