= Anatolii Draholiuntsev =

Ukrainian technician and politician (1938–2023)

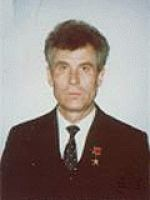
- Draholiuntsev in 1998

People's Deputy of Ukraine
- In office 12 May 1998 – 14 May 2002

Personal details
- Born: Anatolii Dmytrovych Draholiuntsev; 18 June 1938 Voroshilovgrad, Ukrainian SSR, USSR
- Died: 16 September 2023 (aged 85) Kyiv, Ukraine
- Party: KPU
- Education: Voroshilovgrad Engineering Technical School
- Occupation: Technician

Anatolii Dmytrovych Draholiuntsev (Ukrainian: Анатолій Дмитрович Драголюнцев; 18 June 1938 – 16 September 2023) was a Ukrainian technician and politician. A member of the Communist Party of Ukraine, he served in the Verkhovna Rada from 1998 to 2002.

Draholiuntsev died in Kyiv on 16 September 2023 at the age of 85.
