= Oleksandr Zadorozhnii =

Ukrainian politician

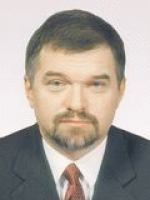
Zadorozhnii in 2002

Oleksandr Viktorovych Zadorozhnii (Ukrainian: Олександр Вікторович Задорожній; 26 June 1960 – 12 May 2017) was a Ukrainian politician who served as People's Deputy from 1998 to 2006. In 1999, he acted as the authorized representative of presidential candidate Leonid Kuchma in his territorial constituency.

== Early life ==
Zadorozhnii was born on 26 June 1960 in the village of Krasnyi Kut, which was then part of the Ukrainian SSR in the Soviet Union. His father, Viktor, was a professor at the Academy of Fine Arts & Architecture, and his mother Klavdiia was retired at the time of his birth. After graduuating in 1982 from the University of Kyiv with a specialty in international law, he received his Candidate of Legal Sciences in 1988. Simultaneously, while as a postgraduate student, he was deputy dean of the faculty there. He worked at the University of Kyiv up until 2008, eventually becoming a professor and vice-rector.

In 1990, he became the founder and director of the law firm "Prosken", which he ran until 1998.

== Political career ==
During the 1998 Ukrainian parliamentary election, he was elected to the Verkhovna Rada for electoral district no. 217 as a member of the People's Democratic Party, before eventually leaving in 2001 and joining the Unity of Oleksandr Omelchenko party. As an MP, he was Chair of the Committee on Legal Policy. He was re-elected during the 2002 Ukrainian parliamentary election, but the time for district no. 213 as part of the Yednist bloc. During this time, he served as a Permanent Representative of the President of Ukraine in the Verkhovna Rada, and was also a member of the Higher Council of Justice. He was dismissed by Yushchenko for a "violation of oath", after he had criticized Yushchenko's dissolution of the Verkhovna Rada and repeated veto of the Cabinet Law. In 2008 he became a staff adviser to Yulia Tymoshenko which was described as a shock due to his long-standing ties to Kuchma.

He died in May 2017.

== Awards ==
- Order of Merit, First Class (2020 – posthumous)
