= Volodymyr Cherniak =

Ukrainian politician (1941–2021)

Volodymyr Kyrylovych Cherniak
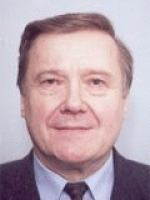

Member of the Verkhovna Rada
- In office 12 May 1998 – 25 May 2006

Personal details
- Born: 26 October 1941 Mnishin, Hoshcha Raion, Rivne Oblast, Ukrainian SSR, USSR
- Died: 18 January 2021 (aged 79)
- Cause of death: COVID-19 complications
- Party: People's Movement of Ukraine

Volodymyr Kyrylovych Cherniak or Volodymyr Chernyak (Ukrainian: Володимир Кирилович Черняк; 26 October 1941 – 18 January 2021) was a Ukrainian politician.

== Political career ==
A member of the People's Movement of Ukraine, he served as a member of the Verkhovna Rada from 1998 till 2006.

== Death ==
Chernyak died from COVID-19 on 18 January 2021, aged 79.
