= Yurii Kruk =

Ukrainian politician (1941–2025)

- Юрій Борисович Крук
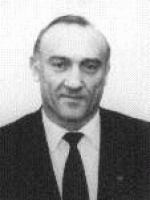
- Official portrait, 1994

People's Deputy of Ukraine
- In office 24 July 1994 – 27 November 2014

Personal details
- Born: Yurii Borysovich Kruk; 2 June 1941 Kherson, Ukrainian SSR, USSR
- Died: 22 May 2025 (aged 83) Odesa, Ukraine
- Party: Batkivshchyna (2002–2012); Party of Regions (2012–2014)
- Education: Odesa National Maritime University
- Occupation: Engineer

Yurii Borysovich Kruk (Ukrainian: Юрій Борисович Крук; 2 June 1941 – 22 May 2025) was a Ukrainian politician. A member of Batkivshchyna and subsequently the Party of Regions, he served in the Verkhovna Rada from 1994 to 2014.

Kruk died in Odesa on 22 May 2025, at the age of 83.
