= Hanna Antonieva =

Ukrainian politician (born 1961)

- Ганна Антоньєва
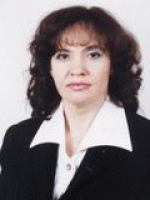

Member of the Verkhovna Rada
- In office 12 May 1998 – 25 May 2006

Personal details
- Born: Hanna Petrivna Antonieva; 29 August 1961 (age 64) Pomichna, Ukraine, Soviet Union

Hanna Petrivna Antonieva (born 29 August 1961) is a Ukrainian politician and businesswoman. People's Deputy of Ukraine of the 3rd and 4th convocations.

== Early life and education ==
Hanna Antonieva was born on 29 August 1961 in Pomichna, Dobrovelichkiv district, Kirovohrad region, Ukrainian SSR. From 1978 to 1980, she studied at Oleksandriia Pedagogical College, Kirovohrad region. In 1989 she graduated from the Kirovohrad Pedagogical Institute (now Volodymyr Vynnychenko Central Ukrainian State University). Antonieva graduated from National Academy of State Administration and State Tax University.

== Career ==
Between 1980 and 1983 Hanna Antonieva worked as a Primary School Teacher at Ivanivka Secondary School of Novoukrainsky district, Kirovohrad region. From 1983 to 1988, she worked as a Primary School and Geography Teacher at Kirovohrad 8-Year School N. 7.

In 1988, Antonieva was a Teacher-Organizer of Children's and Youth Clubs at the Kirovohrad Youth Center “TOM”. In 1988–1989, she served as a Responsible Organizer of the Department of Propaganda and Cultural and Mass Work at Kirovohrad Moscow Committee of the Lenin's Communist Youth Union (Komsomol). From 1990 to 1995, Antonieva was a Director of the Youth Sports and Health Center “Junior”, later – “Junior” LLC (1995-1997). Between 1995 and 1998, she was the General Director of one of the largest producers of alcoholic beverages in Ukraine “Artemida”.

In May 1999, Antonieva became a Member of the Presidium of the National Council of the Democratic Party of Ukraine. Since March 1999, she has been the Head of the Democratic Party of Ukraine.

From March 1998 to April 2002, Antonieva was a People's Deputy of Ukraine of the 3rd convocation, election region N 98, Kirovohrad. At the time of the elections, she was a General Director of the alcoholic beverages producer company “Artemida”. Antonieva was a Member of the People's Democratic Party faction (05.1998-02.99), the "Revival of the Regions" group (02.1999-04.2001), the Committee on Economic Policy, National Economy Management, Property and Investments (07.1998—02.99), Committee on Health, Maternity and Childhood Protection (02.1999—04.2000), and the Committee on State Construction and Local Self-Government (since 04.2000).

From April 2002 to April 2006, Antonieva was a People's Deputy of Ukraine of the 4th convocation, elected region N 99, Kirovohrad, self-nomination. At the time of the elections, she was a People's Deputy of Ukraine as a member of the Democratic Party of Ukraine. During her term of service, Antonieva became a member of the "Regions of Ukraine" faction (06.2002-01.2005), then non-factional (11-21.01.2005), and a member of the Party of Industrialists and Entrepreneurs of Ukraine faction (since March 2005). She was a Member of the Committee on Environmental Policy, Nature Management and Liquidation of the Chornobyl Disaster (since June 2002).

From 2006 to 2010, Antonieva was a Deputy of the Verkhovna Rada of Crimea. Since February 2000, she has been the President of the International Institute of Democracy.

== Private life ==
Hanna Antonieva has three children: two sons and one daughter.

== Awards and honors ==
Order of St. Anna, 2nd class (Ukrainian Orthodox Church (Moscow Patriarchate, 1999).
