= Alla Aleksandrovska =

Ukrainian politician

- Алла Александровська
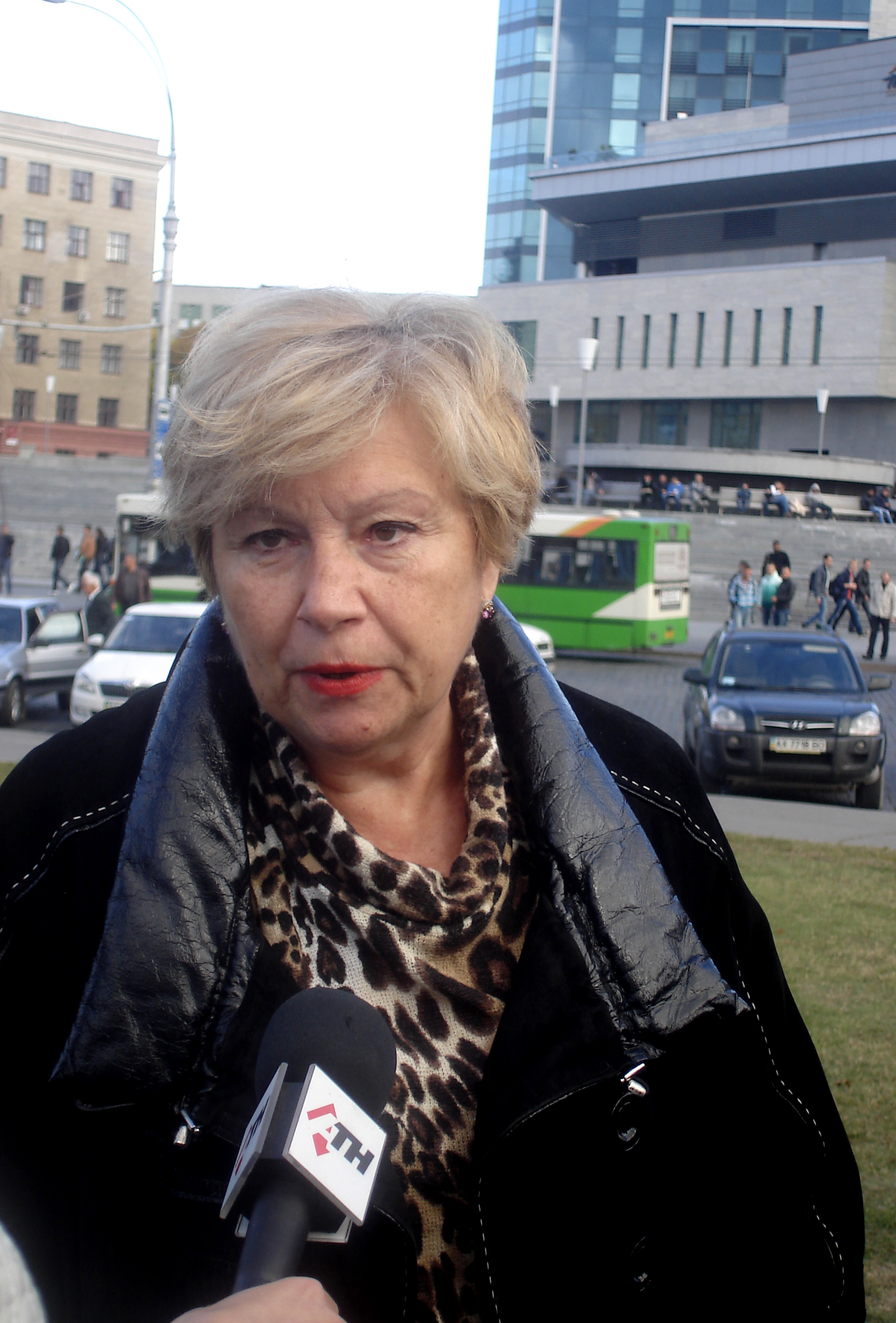
- Aleksandrovska in 2014

People's Deputy of Ukraine
- In office 12 May 1998 – 12 December 2012

Personal details
- Born: 7 December 1948 (age 77) Kharkiv, Ukrainian SSR, Soviet Union
- Party: Communist Party of Ukraine

Alla Oleksandrivna Aleksandrovska (Ukrainian: Алла Олександрівна Александровська; 7 December 1948) is a Ukrainian politician. A member of the Communist Party of Ukraine, she served as a member of the Verkhovna Rada from 1998 to 2012.

== Biography ==
Aleksandrovska was born on 7 December 1948 in Kharkiv. She studied in Kharkkiv school No.116, graduated from Kharkiv Aviation Institute in 1972 as qualified mechanical engineer. In 1990s she graduated from Kharkiv Institute of Interdisciplinary Economics, with qualification in Management and Marketing. Since 1972 had worked as an engineer, then senior engineer, then as team manager of the design bureau JSC "Khartron". Aleksandrovska has been the First Secretary in Kharkiv regional Communist Party Committee and the Member of the Presidium of the Communist Party of Ukraine (February 2001- June 2005).

== Member of Parliament ==
=== 3rd Verkhovna Rada ===
From 1998 to 2002, Aleksandrovska was elected the People's Deputy from the Communist Party, No. 24 in the list. At the time of elections, she was working as team manager of the design bureau JSC "Khartron", Kharkiv. Also, she was Member of Verkhovna Rada Committee on Fuel and Energy Complex, Nuclear Policy and Nuclear Safety.

=== 4th Verkhovna Rada ===
From 2002 to 2006, Aleksandrovska was the People's Deputy from the Communist Party, No. 21 in the list. Her activities during the plenary included:

- Member of the Committee on Fuel and Energy Complex, Nuclear Policy and Nuclear Safety.
- Member of Verkhovna Rada Committee on Fuel and Energy Complex, Nuclear Policy and Nuclear Safety.
- Secretary of the Group of Interparliamentary Relations with the Kingdom of Sweden.
- Member of the Group of Interparliamentary Relations with Russian Federation.
- Member of the Group of Interparliamentary Relations with the Republic of Belarus.
- Member of the Group of Interparliamentary Relations with Canada.
- Member of the Group of Interparliamentary Relations with the Republic of Iraq.

=== 5th Verkhovna Rada ===
From 2006 to 2007, Aleksandrovska was the People's Deputy from the Communist Party, No. 17 in the list. Activities:

- Chairman of Verkhovna Rada of Ukraine Interim Commission for audit of the situation with providing natural gas to Ukrainian consumers, payments for the delivered natural gas and possible violations of acting law at the energy market of Ukraine.
- Secretary of the Budget Committee of Verkhovna Rada of Ukraine.
- Deputy Head of the Group for Interparliamentary Relations with Syria.
- Member of the Group for Interparliamentary Relations with the Arab Republic of Egypt.
- Member of the Group of Interparliamentary Relations with Russian Federation.
- Member of the Group of Interparliamentary Relations with the Kingdom of Sweden.
- Member of the Group of Interparliamentary Relations with the Republic of Cuba

=== 6th Verkhovna Rada ===
Since November 2007, Alla Aleksandrovska has been the People's Deputy of Ukraine in the 6th Verkhovna Rada, elected by CPU lists (No. 19) Positions during the plenary:

- Secretary of the Budget Committee of Verkhovna Rada of Ukraine.
- Secretary of the Interim Commission of the Verkhovna Rada of Ukraine on the audit of the National Bank of Ukraine during the financial crisis.
- Member of the Special Control Commission of the Verkhovna Rada of Ukraine on privatization issues.
- Head of the Group for Interparliamentary Relations with Syria.
- Member of the Group of Interparliamentary Relations with the Republic of Cuba

Aleksandrovska did not return to parliament after the 2012 Ukrainian parliamentary election after losing in single-member districts number 170 (first-past-the-post wins a parliament seat) located in Kharkiv.

== See also ==
- 2007 Ukrainian parliamentary election
- List of Ukrainian Parliament Members 2007
