= Zoryslava Romovska =

Ukrainian lawyer and politician (born 1940)

- Зорислава Ромовська
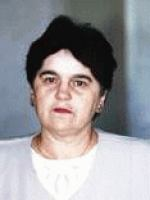

People's Deputy of Ukraine in the 3rd convocation of the Verkhovna Rada
- In office 12 May 1998 – 14 May 2002
- Constituency: Yavoriv

Personal details
- Born: 18 September 1940 (age 86) Kosiv Ivano-Frankivsk region
- Party: Reforms and Order Party
- Education: University of Lviv
- Awards: Honored Lawyer of Ukraine

Zoryslava Vasylivna Romovska (Ukrainian: Зорислава Василівна Ромовська, born 18 September 1940) is a Ukrainian lawyer and politician. She was a People's Deputy of Ukraine in the Verkhovna Rada from 1998 to 2002 and was President of the Association of Ukrainian Lawyers.

== Early life ==
Romovska was born on 18 September 1940 in Korshiv, Ivano-Frankivsk Oblast.

== Career ==
=== Law ===
In 1962, Romovska graduated from the University of Lviv. She became a Doctor of Juridical Science (SJD) in 1986. She spent most of her career at the University of Lviv, rising from the rank of assistant, to senior lecturer, to associate professor, and finally in 1986 to professor.

From 1997 to 1998 she was Head of the Department of Civil Law and Procedure at the university, and she would later return to being a professor of the same department after her political career. In 2015 she became a professor of the Department of Intellectual Property, Information and Corporate Law there. She was also the President of the Association of Ukrainian Lawyers.

In 2018, Romovska worked as Head of the Department of Civil, Commercial Law and Procedure of the Academy of the Bar of Ukraine.

=== Politics ===
Romovska served as a co-founder of the Reforms and Order Party in 1997.

Romovska was elected as a People's Deputy of Ukraine in the 3rd convocation of the Verkhovna Rada (12 May 1998 to 14 May 2002), representing Yavoriv. While in office, she participated in the development of property law and the Civil Code of Ukraine and authored books on Ukrainian law. She also served as a member of the Scientific Advisory Councils of the Supreme Court of Ukraine and the Central Election Commission.

== Awards ==
- Honored Lawyer of Ukraine (1998)
