= Irina Belousova =

Ukrainian former politician

Iryna Belousova
- Ірина Белоусова
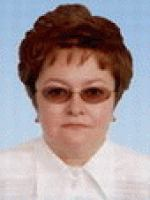
- Official Verkhovna Rada portrait, 2007

People's Deputy of Ukraine
- In office 30 September 2007 – 12 December 2012
- Constituency: Lytvyn Bloc, No. 16
- In office 29 March 1998 – 14 May 2002
- Constituency: Party of Greens, No. 14

Personal details
- Born: 10 July 1954 (age 72) Yugoryonok, Yakut ASSR, Russian SFSR, Soviet Union
- Party: Lytvyn Bloc
- Other political affiliations: Party of Greens of Ukraine
- Education: Kyiv National Economic University

Іryna Anatoliivna Belousova (Ukrainian: Ірина Анатоліївна Белоусова; born 10 July 1954) is a Ukrainian former politician who served as a People's Deputy of Ukraine from the Lytvyn Bloc 2007 to 2012. She was previously a People's Deputy from the proportional-representative list of the Party of Greens of Ukraine from 1998 to 2002.

== Biography ==
Belousova was born on 10 July 1954, in the settlement of Yugoryonok in the Yakut Autonomous Soviet Socialist Republic within the Soviet Union.

=== Education ===
She graduated from Kyiv National Economic University, Department of Accounting and Economics (studied in 1974-1978), majoring in Accounting. In 1996 she received her PhD with the thesis "Recording and analysis of production efficiency (based on arts and crafts enterprises of Ukraine)".

== Career ==
- 1978–1981 – worked as engineer, senior accountant, senior economist at the Ministry of Local Industry of the Ukrainian Soviet Republic.
- 1981–1984 – senior accountant, Head of the financial department at Republic Association of arts and crafts, Ministry of Local Industry of the Ukrainian Soviet Republic.
- 1984–1986 – Head of the financial department, chief accountant at industrial association Ukrlyonokonopleprom.
- 1986–1988 – Head of Accounting and Reporting at the Ministry of Light Industry of the Ukrainian SSR.
- 1988–1991 – Deputy Head of Economic Affairs at the trust "Ukrremlehbud".
- 1991–1992 – Director of finance and credit center, chief accountant of the Association "Perspective"
- 1992–1995 – chief accountant at the research and service center "Pikom"
- 1995–1998 – Director of the audit company "Multi-audit".
- 2001–2002 – state commissioner of the Antimonopoly Committee of Ukraine
- 2002–2004 – Deputy Chairman and the state commissioner of the Antimonopoly Committee of Ukraine

== Political career ==
- March 1998 – April 2002 – People's Deputy of Ukraine in the 3rd Verkhovna Rada, No. 14 on the list from the Party of Greens of Ukraine. Secretary of the Committee on economic policy, agricultural management, property and investments (since 1998), a member of the Party of Greens of Ukraine fraction (since 1998)
- 2002 – candidate for People's Deputy from the association "Women for the Future", No. 3 on the list
- 2006 – candidate for People's Deputy from the opposition bloc "Ne Tak!", No. 11 on the list. At election time she was a professor at Zhytomyr State Technological University
- 2008 – candidate for People's Deputy from Lytvyn Bloc, No. 16 on the list
- Member of the Group on Interparliamentary Relations with the Austrian Republic
- Member of the Group on Interparliamentary Relations with Russian Federation
- Member of the Group on Interparliamentary Relations with the Federal Republic of Germany
- Member of the Group on Interparliamentary Relations with the Republic of Estonia

She was the Deputy Chairman of the Verkhovna Rada of Ukraine on economic policy.

Belousova did not participate in the 2012 Ukrainian parliamentary election and 2014 Ukrainian parliamentary election.

== See also ==
- 2007 Ukrainian parliamentary election
- List of Ukrainian Parliament Members 2007
