= Mykhailo Brodskyy =

Ukrainian politician

Mykhailo Brodsky
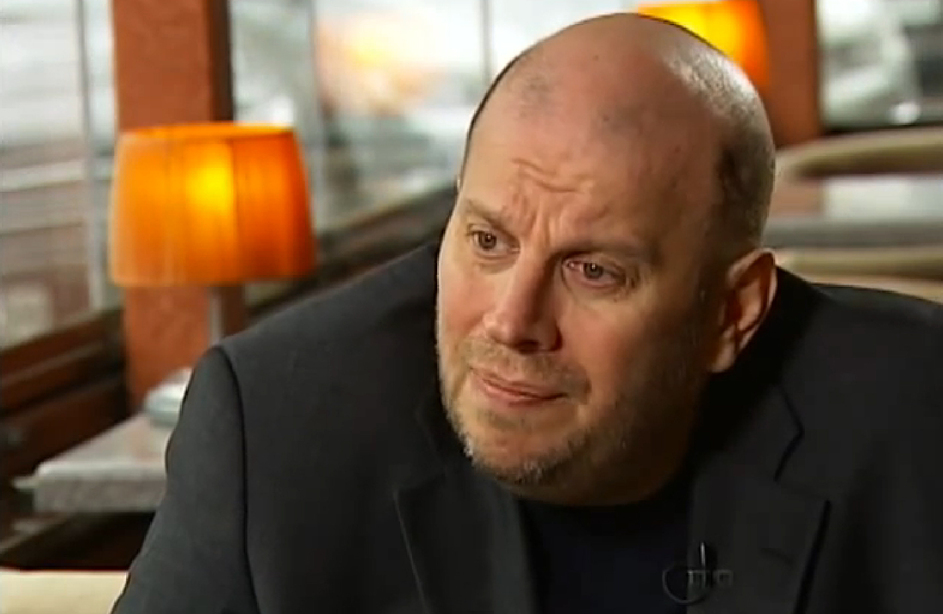

Leader of Party of Free Democrats
- Incumbent
- Assumed office 2000

Personal details
- Born: April 5, 1959 (age 67) Kyiv, Ukrainian SSR, Soviet Union
- Party: Party of Free Democrats

Mykhailo Yuriyovych Brodsky (Ukrainian: Михайло Юрійович Бродський) (born April 5, 1959 in Kiev) is a Ukrainian politician who is the leader of the Party of Free Democrats and businessman.

== Early life ==
Mykhailo Brodsky was born 5 April 1959 in Kyiv.

Since May 1978, he has been employed as a technician at the Kyivdiprotrans Trust.

From 1978 to 1979 he served in the Soviet Army.

From 1979 to 1986 he worked as a technician, engineer-installer of the Kyiv Assembly and Construction Department.

From 1986 to 1989 he worked as a senior engineer, foreman, head of the self-financing section of the Kyivpobutrembud trust.

From 1989 to 1991 he held the position acting deputy head of the Department of Production and Technical Equipment of the Production and Housing Repair Association of the Kyiv City Executive Committee.

From 1991 to 1994 he worked as director of the small state enterprise "Tompo".

From 1994 to 1997 he worked as president of the "Dandy" concern.

Graduated from the Institute of Market Relations and Entrepreneurship of the "Rynok International Center" in 1996. Specialization in production management.

== Political career ==
He was a national deputy (member of Parliament) of Ukraine from 1998 to 2002 during the third convocation, where he was on the Committee on Legislative Support of Law Enforcement and Combating Organized Crime and Corruption. He was a chair of the publishing house "Kyivskie Vedmosti" in 1998, but lost control of it after being jailed on corruption charges. He was chairman of the "Yabluko" ("Apple") Party in from June 2002 to 2005. Brodsky was a self-nominated candidate in the 2004 Ukrainian presidential election. His main policies for the election was being in opposition to "oligarchs", and declared when registering that he was running for president in 2004 to bar then Prime Minister of Ukraine, Viktor Yanukovych, from power as he viewed him as corrupt during Yanukovych's leadership when he was Governor of Donetsk Oblast.

Brodskyy allied himself with Yulia Tymoshenko before and during the Orange Revolution (in 2006 he was elected as a deputy of the Kyiv City Council representing the Yulia Tymoshenko Bloc), but broke with her before the snap parliamentary elections of September 2007.

In 2007, he publicly accused Tymoshenko of trying to bribe judges of the Constitutional Court and of selling places on election lists.

Brodskyy was a candidate for President of Ukraine in the 2010 Ukrainian presidential elections nominated by the Party of Free Democrats, during the election he received penultimate 17th place with 0.06% of the votes.

From 2010 to 2014, Brodskyy headed the State Committee of Ukraine on Regulatory Policy and Entrepreneurship in the Azarov Government.
