= Honorary Diploma of the Cabinet of Ministers of Ukraine =

Ukrainian government award

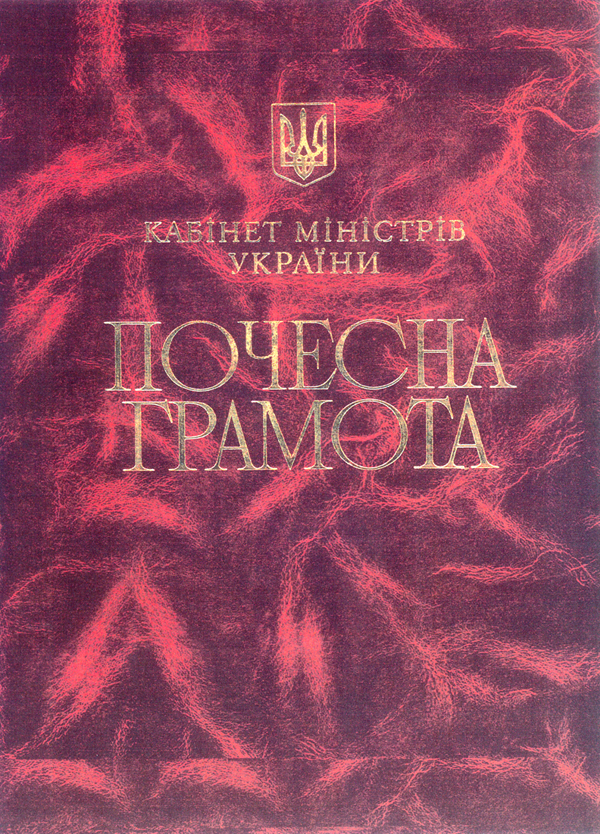
Cover

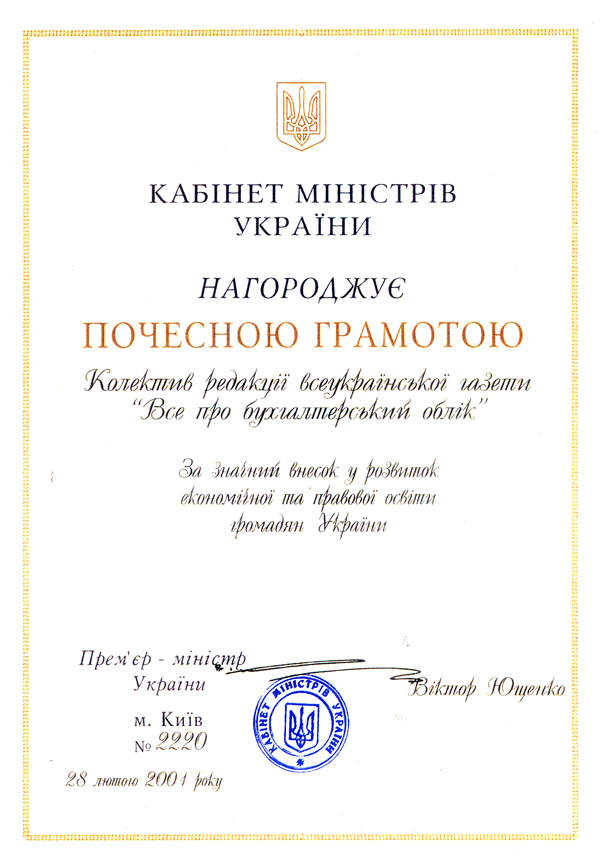
Diploma

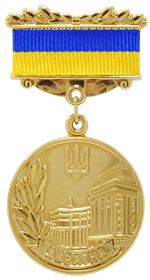
Medal, Cabinet of Ministers, 2010.

The Honorary Diploma of the Cabinet of Ministers of Ukraine is a government award for many years of hard work, exemplary performance of official duties, personal contribution to economic, scientific, technical, socio-cultural, military, public and other spheres of activity, service to the Ukrainian people in promoting the rule of law and implementation of measures to ensure the protection of the rights and freedoms of citizens, the development of democracy, and the effective operation of executive bodies and local governments.

== Recipients ==
- All About Accounting
- Yuriy Andryushin
- Stanislav Arzhevitin
- Anatoly Avdievsky
- Volodymyr Babayev
- Nikolai Bagrov
- Ihor Bakai
- Tatyana Bakhteeva
- Hanna Balabanova
- Petro Balabuyev
- Ihor Baluta
- Valery Baranov
- Ivan Bekh
- Vasyl Bertash
- Anna Bessonova
- Mykola Bilokon
- Raisa Bogatyrova
- Andriy Bohdan
- Viktor Bondar
- Valery Borisov
- Volodymyr Borysovsky
- Valeriy Borzov
- Yehor Bozhok
- Lev Brovarskyi
- Mark Brovun
- Sergey Bubka
- Vladyslav Bukhariev
- Mykhailo Chechetov
- Danylo Chufarov
- Sergei Chukhray
- Anatoliy Danylenko
- Filaret (Denysenko)
- Rostyslav Derzhypilsky
- Mykhailo Dobkin
- Ivan Dombrovskyy
- Dmytro Drozdovskyi
- Oleksandr Dubovoy
- Mustafa Dzhemilev
- Epiphanius of Kyiv
- Oleksandr Feldman
- Kostyantyn Gryshchenko
- Vasyl Grytsak
- Bohdan Hawrylyshyn
- Volodymyr Holubnychy
- Valeria Hontareva
- Vasyl Hrytsak
- Serhiy Ivanov
- K. D. Ushinsky South Ukrainian National Pedagogical University
- Hennadiy Kernes
- Vitaliy Khomutynnik
- Serhii Kivalov
- Pavlo Klimkin
- Vitali Klitschko
- Yuri Komelkov
- Valeriy Konovalyuk
- Valeriy Koroviy
- Oleksiy Kostusyev
- Oksana Krechunyak
- Yuriy Kryvoruchko
- Anatoliy Kukoba
- Serhiy Kunitsyn
- Volodymyr Kuratchenko
- Vasyl Kuybida
- Oleksandr Lavrynovych
- Oleksandr Liashko
- Olena Lukash
- Lyudmyla Lyatetska
- Ihor Lytovchenko
- Mykola Lytvyn
- Macarius of Lviv
- Oksana Madarash
- Ivan Malkovych
- Volodymyr Malyshev
- Anatoliy Mazaraki
- Volodymyr Melnykov
- Anatolii Mokrousov
- Hennadiy Moskal
- Vasyl Moroz
- Oleksandr Motsyk
- Pavlo Movchan
- Boris Muzalev
- Serhiy Nadal
- Volodymyr Nechyporuk
- Oleh Nemchinov
- Vladyslav Nosov
- Volodymyr Ohryzko
- Borys Oliynyk
- Yuriy Oliynyk
- Vitaliy Oluiko
- Svitlana Onyschuk
- Borys Paton
- Pavlo Tychyna Uman State Pedagogical University
- Oleksandr Peklushenko
- Igor Piddubny
- Anastasiia Pidpalova
- Ivan Plachkov
- Lilia Podkopayeva
- Ruslan Ponomariov
- Oksana Prodan
- Eduard Prutnik
- Oleksiy Prylipka
- Anatolii Prysyazhnyuk
- Valeriy Pshenychnyy
- Valeriy Pustovoitenko
- Petro Pysarchuk
- Viktor Razvadovsky
- Aleksandr Riabeka
- Ruslan Riaboshapka
- Roman Romanyuk
- Nicodemus (Rusnak)
- Volodymyr Rybak
- Igor Fedorovych Sharov
- Georgy Shchokin
- Volodymyr Sheiko
- Leonid Shkolnick
- Nelya Shtepa
- Oleksandr Skipalsky
- Yuriy Smirnov
- Yakiv Smolii
- Valeriy Smoliy
- Yuliya Sokolovska
- Yevhen Stankovych
- Stanislav Stashevsky
- Olha Stefanishyna
- Mariia Stefiuk
- Yuriy Stets
- Yaroslav Sukhyi
- Liudmyla Suprun
- Hryhoriy Surkis
- Dmytro Svyatash
- Denys Sylantyev
- Oleh Synyehubov
- Dmytro Tabachnyk
- Elbrus Tedeyev
- Ihor Terekhov
- Serhiy Teryokhin
- Viktor Tikhonov (politician)
- Mykola Tochytskyi
- Petro Tronko
- Gennadiy Trukhanov
- Oleg Tsaryov
- Serhiy Tulub
- Vladimir Turkevich
- Volodymyr Tyahlo
- Ivan Tymchenko
- Yevhen Udod
- Ukrainian Radio Symphony Orchestra
- Zhanna Usenko-Chorna
- Gurzhos Vadym
- Tariel Vasadze
- Hennadiy Vasilyev
- Andriy Vasylyshyn
- Lev Venediktov
- Oleksandr Vilkul
- Oleksandr Volkov
- Eduard von Falz-Fein
- Dmytro Vorona
- Mykola Yankovsky
- Viktor Yanukovych
- Volodymyr Yatsuba
- Petro Yurchyshyn
- Mykhaylo Zagirnyak
- Mykola Zaludyak
- Anatoliy Zasukha
- Oleksandr Zats
- Volodymyr Zelenskyy
- Lana Zerkal
- Dmytro Zhyvytskyi
- Oleksandr Zinchenko
- Yukhym Zvyahilsky
- Hryhoriy Piatachenko
- Fedir Yaroshenko
- Valentyn Koronevsky
- Hryhoriy Piatachenko
- Vasyl Nadraha
- Serhiy Yermilov

== See also ==
- Honorary Diploma of the Verkhovna Rada of Ukraine
- Diploma of the Verkhovna Rada of Ukraine
- Awards of Ukraine
- Orders, decorations, and medals of Ukraine
