= Honorary Diploma of the Verkhovna Rada of Ukraine =

Ukrainian award

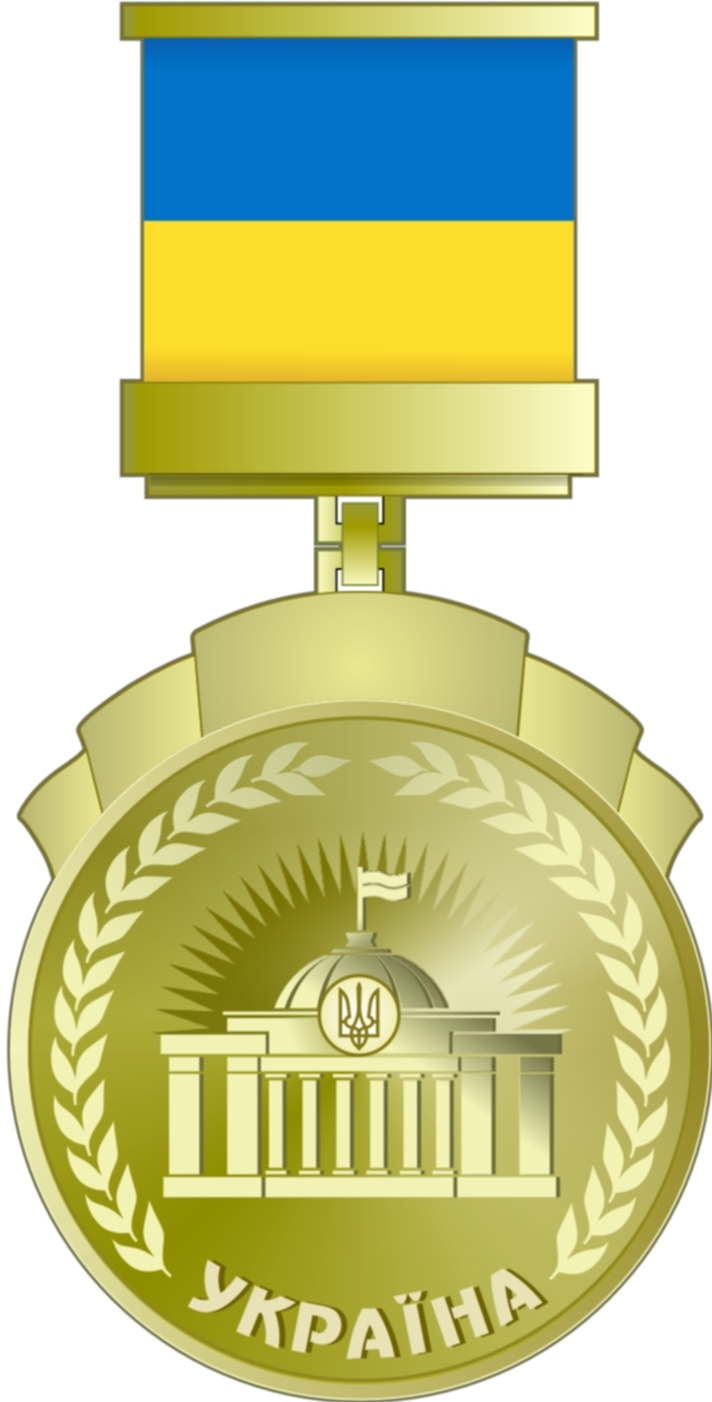
Badge of the Honorary Diploma of the Verkhovna Rada of Ukraine

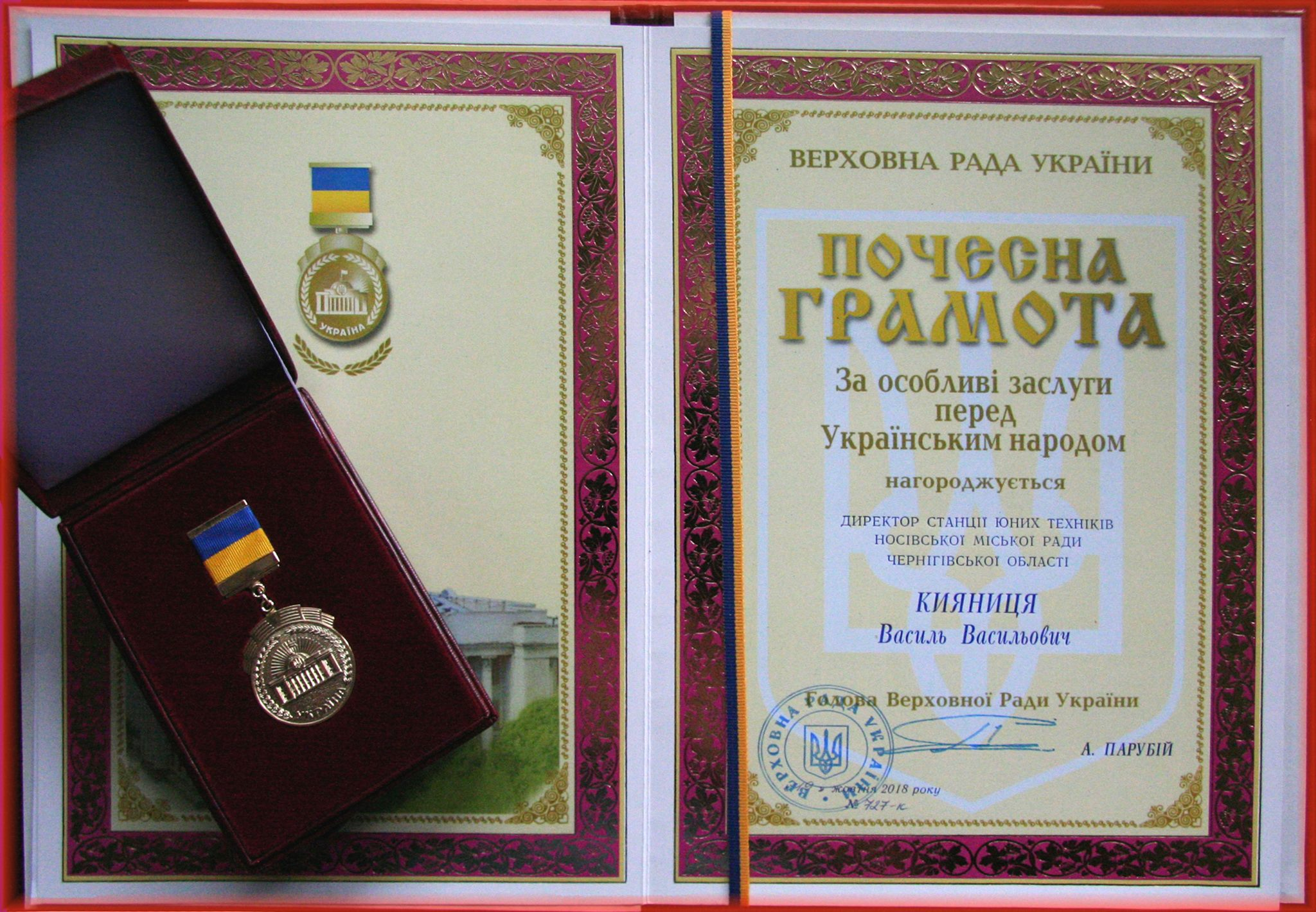
Honorary Diploma of the Verkhovna Rada

The Honorary Diploma of the Verkhovna Rada of Ukraine is an award of the Verkhovna Rada (parliament) of Ukraine for significant contribution to any sphere of life, outstanding socio-political activities, services to the Ukrainian people in promoting and strengthening Ukraine as a democratic, social, legal state, implementing measures to ensure rights and freedoms of citizens, development of democracy, parliamentarism and civil harmony in society, and active participation in legislative activities.

== Laureates ==
- Volodymyr Babayev
- Ivan Bekh
- Valery Bevzenko
- Oleh Bilorus
- Larysa Bilozir
- Olga Bodnar
- Yuriy Bohutsky
- Vitaliy Boiko
- Viktor Bondar
- Valery Borisov
- Volodymyr Borysovsky
- Vladyslav Bukhariev
- Pavlo Burlakov
- Taras Chornovil
- Danylo Chufarov
- Valentyna Danishevska
- Volodymyr Demishkan
- Ivan Dombrovskyy
- Mustafa Dzhemilev
- Vasyl Filipchuk
- Patrice Gélard
- Vasyl Grytsak
- Liliya Hrynevych
- Roman Karpyuk
- Hennadiy Kernes
- Serhiy Komisarenko
- Taras Kostanchuk
- Leonid Kozachenko
- Larysa Krushelnytska
- Stepan Kubiv
- Peter Loboda
- Valeriy Malikov
- Volodymyr Malyshev
- Anatoliy Mazaraki
- Vasyl Moroz
- Oleksandr Motsyk
- Boris Muzalev
- Andriy Mykhaylyk
- Serhiy Nadal
- Stanislav Nikolaenko
- Vladyslav Nosov
- Nikolay Olyalin
- Oleksandr Peklushenko
- Petro Poroshenko
- Viktor Razvadovsky
- Aleksandr Riabeka
- Alexander Rovt
- Serhii Rudyk
- Lilia Sandulesu
- Leonid Serhienko
- Igor Fedorovych Sharov
- Volodymyr Sheiko
- Serhii Shevchenko
- Vasyl Shevchuk
- Andriy Shkil
- Leonid Shkolnick
- Viktor Shokin
- Volodymyr Stelmakh
- Ivan Stoiko
- Liudmyla Suprun
- Oleksandr Sydorenko
- Kostiantyn Sytnyk
- Ihor Terekhov
- Serhiy Teryokhin
- Oleksandr Tolokonnikov
- Serhiy Tulub
- Vladimir Turkevich
- Ivan Tymchenko
- Oleg Vyshniakov
- Mykola Yankovsky
- Oleksandr Zadorozhnii
- Mykhaylo Zagirnyak
- Anatoliy Zahorodniy
- Anatoliy Zasukha
- Valentyn Koronevsky

== See also ==
- Diploma of the Verkhovna Rada of Ukraine
