= Sergiyenko =

Sergiyenko (Ukrainian: Сергієнко; Russian: Сергеенко, Сергиенко) is a surname of Ukrainian origin. Other transliterations include Serhiyenko, Serhienko, Serhiienko, Sergeyenko, and Sergeenko.

Notable people with the surname include:

- Davit Sergeenko (born 1963), Georgian physician and healthcare manager
- Leonid Serhienko (born 1955), Ukrainian politician
- Mariya Sergeyenko (1891–1987), Soviet historian
- Ulyana Sergeenko (born 1979), Russian fashion designer
- Yuriy Sergiyenko (born 1965), Ukrainian athlete
