= Diploma of the Verkhovna Rada of Ukraine =

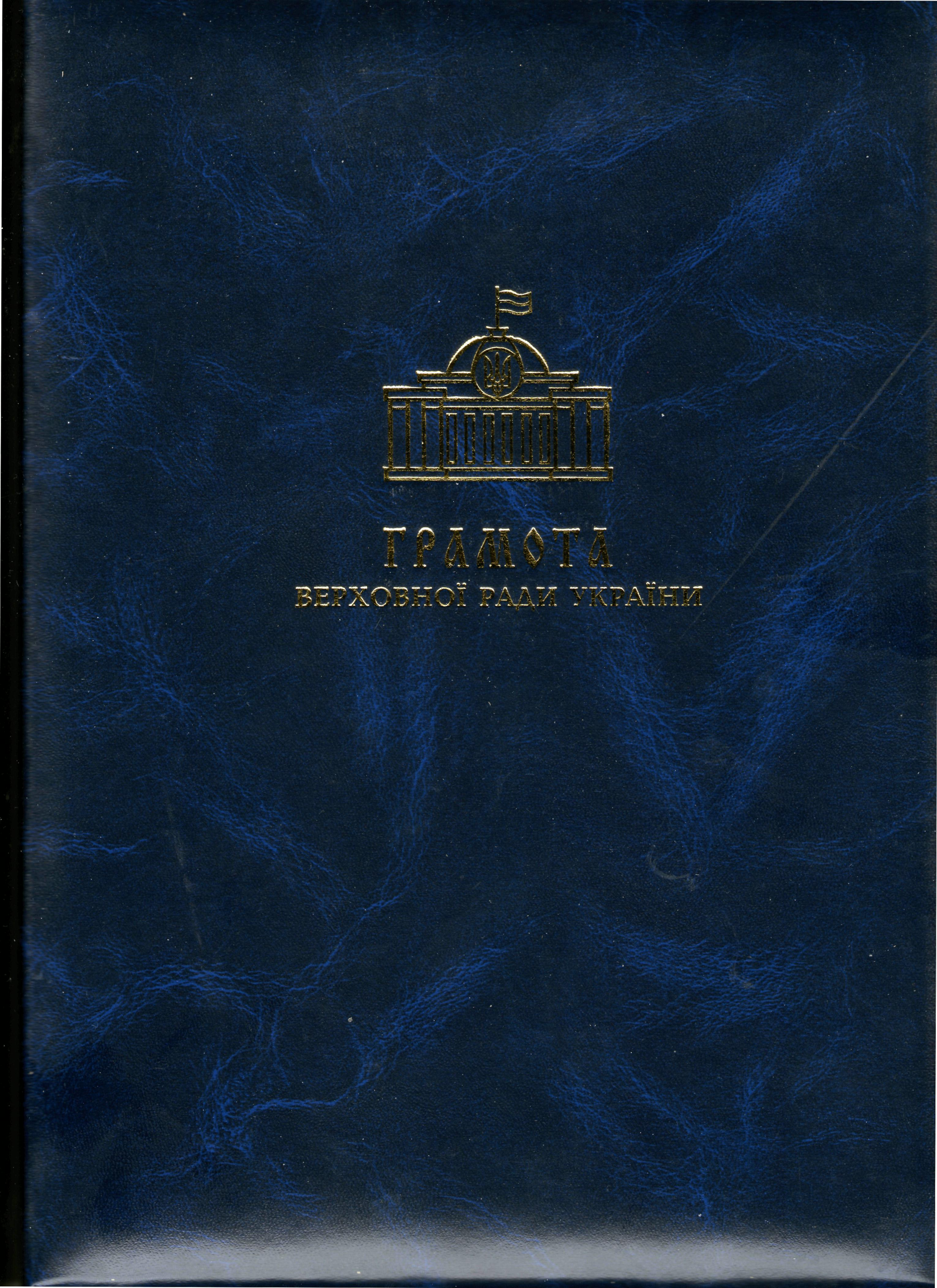
Diploma of the Verkhovna Rada of Ukraine

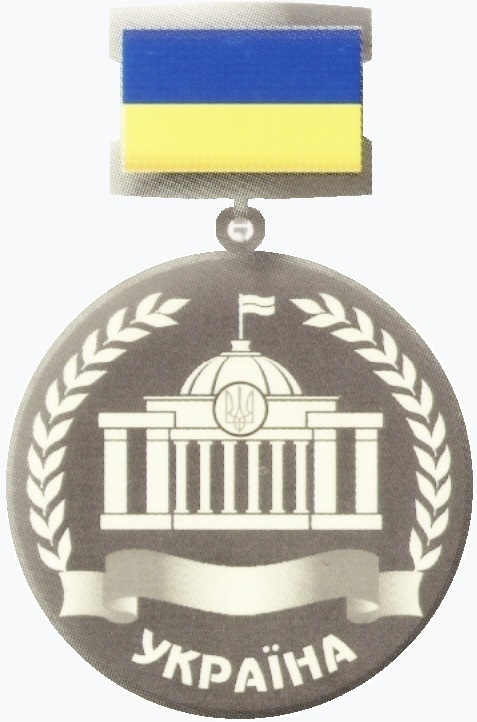
Badge of the Diploma of the Verkhovna Rada of Ukraine

The Diploma of the Verkhovna Rada of Ukraine is an award of the Verkhovna Rada of Ukraine for significant contribution to any sphere of state life, outstanding socio-political activity, merits to the Ukrainian people in promoting and strengthening Ukraine as a democratic, social, legal state, implementation of rights and freedoms of citizens, development of democracy, parliamentarism and civil harmony in society, and finally, active participation in legislative activities.

== Laureates ==
- All About Accounting
- Rustam Akhmetov
- Oleksandr Abdullin
- Volodymyr Biletskyy
- Oleh Bilorus
- Andriy Chebykin
- Epiphanius of Kyiv
- Vasyl Grytsak
- K. D. Ushinsky South Ukrainian National Pedagogical University
- Anatoli Ljutjuk
- Volodymyr Malyshev
- Oleh Musiy
- Boris Muzalev
- Oleh Nemchinov
- Viktor Ostapchuk
- Oleg Shapovalov
- Oleksandr Sydorenko
- Mykola Tochytskyi
- Yevhen Udod
- Leonid Burlachuk

== See also ==
- Honorary Diploma of the Verkhovna Rada of Ukraine
