= Oleksandr Abdullin =

Ukrainian journalist and politician

- Олександр Абдуллін
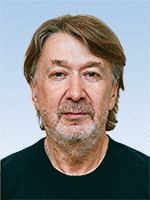

People's Deputy of Ukraine
- Incumbent
- Assumed office 2 October 1998

Personal details
- Born: 29 June 1962 (age 63) Kyiv, Ukrainian SSR, Soviet Union
- Party: Fatherland
- Spouse: Tetyana
- Children: Yevhenia; Oleksandra

Oleksandr Rafkatovych Abdullin (Ukrainian: Олекса́ндр Рафка́тович Абду́ллін, born June 29, 1962, in Kyiv) is a Ukrainian journalist, politician and member of parliament.

== Positions and places of work ==
- 1979–1981 – turner at "Tochelektroprylad" plant, Kyiv.
- 1981–1983 – military service.
- 1983–1989 – student of Taras Shevchenko National University of Kyiv, Faculty of Journalism.
- 1985–1987 – correspondent for the "News from Ukraine" newspaper.
- 1987–1992 – correspondent and business manager at "Robitnycha gazeta" (English: Labour Newspaper).
- 1992–1993 – Director of "Inter Trade" company.
- 1993–1995 – Vice–president of "Republic" corporation.
- 1995–1998 – President of CJSC "Intergaz", Kyiv.

== Awards ==
- Honoured Journalist of Ukraine in 1997
- Chernobyl Disaster Liquidator
- Order of Saint Prince Vladimir of the I and II class, Diploma of Pope John Paul II, and the medal "For Merits" of the I class (Union of Afghanistan Veterans)
- Orders of Merit, II and III class
- Diploma of Verkhovna Rada of Ukraine (2005).

== Member of Verkhovna Rada ==
=== 3rd Verkhovna Rada of Ukraine (1998–2002) ===
- October 1998 to April 2002 – People's Deputy of the 3rd Verkhovna Rada, electoral ward No 97, Kyiv region, he won 48.8% votes, with 9 opponents. During elections he took the position of President of CJSC "Intergaz" in Kyiv city.
- February 1999 to April 2001 – the member of "Vidrodzhennya regioniv" group (eng. – Revival of the Regions)
- since April 2001 – member of the fraction of "Democratic Union" Party
- since February 1999 – member of the Committee on Construction, Transport and Communications
- March 1998 – candidate to People's Deputy from Christian-Democratic Party of Ukraine, No 10 in the list.

=== 4th Verkhovna Rada of Ukraine (2002–2006) ===
Abdullin was elected by electoral site No.156 (Rivne region), nominated by election bloc of Political Parties "Democratic Party of Ukraine – Democratic Union Party". He had 34.86% votes, against 14 opponents. At the time of elections Abdullin was People's Deputy of Ukraine, member of "Democratic Union Party", member of fraction "United Ukraine" (May – June 2002), member of European Choice Group (June – December 2002), member of fraction of SDPU (December 2002 – March 2005), since March 2005 member of Yulia Tymoshenko Bloc and member of the Committee on Environmental Policy, Natural Resources and Elimination of Consequences of Chornobyl Accident (since June 2002).

Date of accepting the MPs assignment	14 May 2002
Party affiliation (at the time of elections)	Democratic Union Party
Education	higher
Profession	Journalist
Previous place of work	MP of Ukraine
Committee	Committee on Environmental Policy, Natural Resources and Elimination of Consequences of Chornobyl Accident
Position in the committee	member of the Committee
Fraction	fraction of SDPU; member of fraction "United Ukraine" (May – June 2002)

=== 5th, 6th, 7th and 8th Verkhovna Rada of Ukraine (2006–present) ===
In April 2006, Abdullin was elected a People's Deputy of Ukraine of the 5th Verkhovna Rada, placing 74th on the party list of the Yulia Tymoshenko Bloc. At the time of elections: People's Deputy of Ukraine, member of All-Ukrainian Union "Fatherland". Member of the Committee on Environmental Policy, Natural Resources and Elimination of Consequences of Chornobyl Accident (since June 2002), member of fraction of Yulia Tymoshenko Bloc (since May 2006), Deputy Chairman (since August 2006).

In November 2007, he was elected to the 6th Verkhovna Rada, appearing on the party list of the Yulia Tymoshenko Bloc. In 2012 he was re-elected into parliament on the party list of "Fatherland" (number 28 on this list).

In the 2014 Ukrainian parliamentary election he was again re-elected into parliament; this time after placing 17th on the electoral list of "Fatherland".

In the 2019 Ukrainian parliamentary election Abdullin was again re-elected into parliament for "Fatherland" this time after placing 11th on the electoral list.

== Personal life ==
Abdullin was born in Kyiv on 29 June 1962. He speaks English and French. He is married to Tetyana (b. 1962), a designer at a construction company. They have two daughters, Yevhenia (b. 1988) and Oleksandra (b. 1991).
