= Andriy Chebykin =

Ukrainian graphic artist and teacher (born 1946)

- Андрій Чебикін
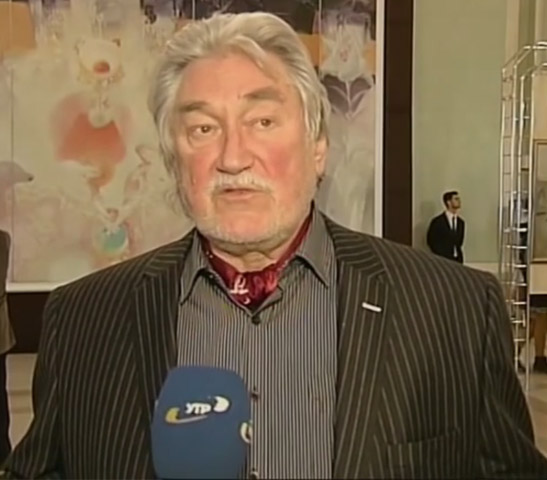
- Chebykin in 2014
- Born: 14 April 1946 (age 80); Haisyn, Vinnytsia Oblast, USSR
- Education: Shevchenko State Art School; Kyiv National Art Institute
- Occupations: Graphic artist; teacher
- Organization: President of National Academy of Arts of Ukraine
- Political party: Communist Party of the Soviet Union
- Children: Oleksiy Chebykin
- Awards: see here

Andriy Volodymyrovych Chebykin (Ukrainian: Андрій Володимирович Чебикін; born 14 April 1946) is a Ukrainian graphic artist and teacher who became a member of the Union of Soviet Artists of Ukraine since 1973, founder of National Academy of Arts of Ukraine in 1996, and professor of the Department of Graphic Arts of Kyiv National Art Institute.

== Early life and education ==
Born on 14 April 1946, in the Ukrainian city of Haisyn. Chebykin graduated from the Shevchenko State Art School in 1964, and received his degree from the Kyiv National Art Institute in 1970, under the teaching of Leonid Chichkan and Ivan Selivanov. He has been a member of the Communist Party of the Soviet Union since 1975. He started working as a teacher at the same Institute in 1970. Later, this organization appointed him as vice-rector (1980–1987) and rector (1989–2020). He served as the head of the Union of Soviet Artist of Ukraine's Kyiv branch from 1987 to 1989, also the union's board and secretariat. Head of the National Academy of Arts of Ukraine since 1997.

== Architectural career ==
Chebykin works in monumental art, book graphics, and easel fields. He co-wrote the 1978 textbook Техніка офорта for institutes of higher learning in the arts. Over the course of 35 years of teaching, he established a sort of print school. Since 1985, he has been in charge of the National Academy of Fine Arts and Architecture's free graphics workshop.

Chebykin produced a series of tapestries for the interiors of the Donetsk State Academic Opera and Ballet Theatre from 1994 to 1995; cycles of machine drawings and watercolors from 1987 to 2006. The State Tretyakov Gallery in Moscow, the National Art Museum of Ukraine in Kyiv, as well as other museums and private collections throughout the globe, are home to his artwork. His well-known pieces include:

- Illustrations to Ivan Franko's Зів'яле листя (1967–2006)
- Село Обрадове (1970)
- Десять днів, що сколихнули світ (1970)
- Солдатські будні (1972–1973)
- Космічні офорти (1976)
- Мир (1978)
- Всесвіт (1979–1980)
- Перехожі (1986)
- Космос—Земля (1986)
- Американські каньйони (1990)

Chebykin participanted in both international and all-Ukrainian art shows since 1976, this included exhibitions in Dnipropetrovsk (1984), Mykolaiv (1987), Vinnytsia (1988, 1995), Kyiv (1990, 1993, 1996, 1999–2014), Poltava (1993), Kamianets-Podilskyi (1994), and Lviv (1995). He presided over the All-Ukrainian Open Fine Arts Competition #ART jury in 2017. Private collections in the United States, Belgium, Denmark, Greece, Israel, Japan, Jordan, the United Kingdom, the Czech Republic, Slovakia, Germany, Poland, and Ukraine all have his works.

Currently, Chebykin is acting advisor to the presidium at and member of the National Academy of Sciences of Ukraine. He also is the academician-secretary at the same institution's Department of Fine Arts.

== Personal life ==
Chebykin's passport was issued to him without his consent, and it was noted that his mother is Ukrainian and his father is Russian. It found out that he and his brother were representatives of separate countries because the sibling listed on the passport was Ukrainian. He has a son named Alexei (born 1969), an animator and graphic artist. He presently resides in a home on Pechenizka Street, Suite 8 in Kyiv.

== Honours, awards and recognitions ==
Chebykin has received honours, awards and recognitions such as:

=== Honours ===
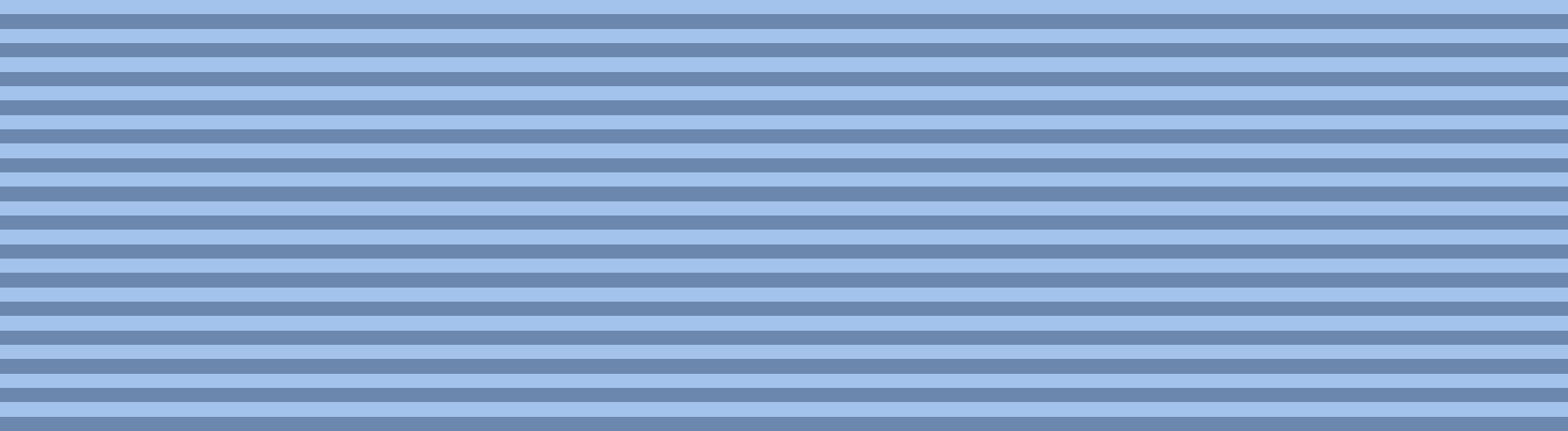
- Order of Prince Yaroslav the Wise IV class (2016); V class (2011)
- Order of Merit First Class (2007); Second Class (2004); Third Class (1997)

=== Awards ===
- Senator's Star of the European Academy of Natural Sciences (2009)
- Shevchenko National Prize (2007)
- Gold Medal of the Academy of Arts of Ukraine (2006)
- Honorary Badge of Honor of the Kyiv Mayor (2006)
- First Prize of the Triennal of Graphics of the National Union of Artists of Ukraine (2000)
- Ivan Ohienko Prize (1997)
- First Prize of the City of Kyiv For Achievements in the Field of Graphics (1994)
- People's Artist of Ukraine (1992)
- Mitrofan Grekov Gold Medal of the Ministry of Culture (1990)
- Honored Art Worker of the Ukrainian SSR (1979)
- Lenin Komsomol Prize (1977)

=== Recognitions ===
- Georgy Yakutovych Diploma (2010)
- Diploma of the Verkhovna Rada of Ukraine (2006)
- Diploma of the IV All-Ukrainian Exhibition of print (1997)
