= Yuri Komelkov =

Ukrainian publisher and gallerist

- Юрій Комельков
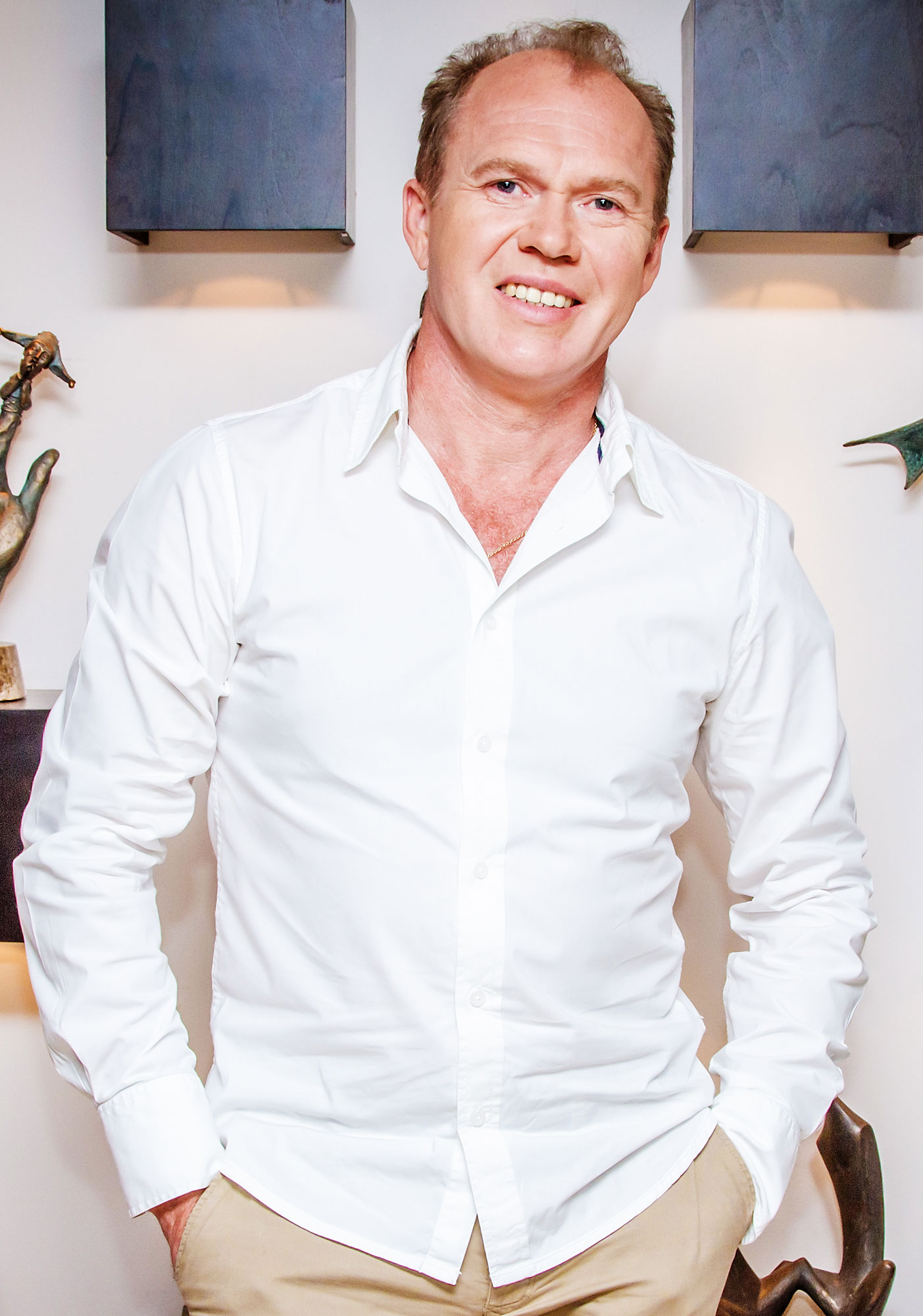
- Komelkov in 2014
- Born: 30 September 1962 (age 63); Siversk, Donetsk Oblast, Ukraine
- Education: Bogomolets National Medical University; Kharkiv Institute of Industrial & Applied Arts
- Occupations: publisher; gallerist; art collector; art patron
- Known for: CEO & owner: Atlant UMC ad agency; CEO & owner: Art-Blues company; Owner: Cultprostir Internet platform; Owner: Triptych gallery; Editor-in-chief & owner: Aura magazine; Owner: Re!Zoni magazine
- Awards: The Certificate of Honour of the Cabinet of Ministers of Ukraine
- Website: cultprostir.ua

Yuri Komelkov (Ukrainian: Юрій Комельков [ˈjur⁽ʲ⁾ij komelʲˈkɔu̯]; born 30 September 1962) is a Ukrainian publisher, gallerist, art collector, and art patron. He is the founder of the full-service advertising agency Atlant UMC (1997), Re!Zoni magazine (2001), the founder of the company Art-Blues (2002) and the Art-Blues gallery (2004), the owner of the Triptych gallery (2003), the founder and the editor-in-chief of Aura magazine (2007), the founder of Cultprostir Internet platform (2014). He also established and ran the artist Ivan Marchuk's charity foundation (2005) and CultAura foundation (2013).

The Certificate of Honour of the Cabinet of Ministers of Ukraine (protocol No. 49 dated 24 September 2008) — "for high achievements in developing publishing and advertising business and significant personal contribution to a successful annual meeting of the Board of Governors of the European Bank for Reconstruction and Development, held in Kyiv, May 2008".

== Biography ==
Yuri Komelkov was born in Siversk, Donetsk Oblast, Ukraine, on 30 September 1962. Graduated from secondary school No. 1 (1979). He graduated with honours from the Bogomolets Kyiv Medical Institute (1985, faculty of general internal medicine). At the same time, he got the second education at Kharkiv Institute of Industrial & Applied Arts (1985, industrial design faculty) according to the public education system; and completed an international course in traumatology and orthopedics specialty according to the AO system (Association for the Study of Osteosynthesis) in Davos (Switzerland, early 1990s).

Career: a staff scientist in Kyiv Scientific Research Institute of Orthopedics and Traumatology (1985–1997), the chief representative of the Swiss company Mathys Medical in Ukraine (1995–1997), owner and CEO of Atlant UMC ad agency (since 1997), president and co-founder of Litton publishing house (2000–2008), the owner of Re!Zoni magazine (2001), the CEO and owner of Art-Blues company (since 2002), the owner of the Triptych gallery (since 2003), the editor-in-chief and the owner of Aura magazine (2007–2009), the owner of Cultprostir Internet platform (since 2014). The place of residence — Kyiv, Ukraine.

Yuri Komelkov holds the medical patent "The method of anterior spine fusion" (Kyiv Scientific Research Institute of Orthopedics). USSR's certificate of authorship No. 833226, class A 61 B 17/56, 1981. The invention is used for osteoplastic fixation of the spine in spine injuries or disorders.

== Publishing activity ==
=== Atlant UMC book editions ===
Atlant UMC (the founder and CEO of which is Yuri Komelkov) is a full-service advertising agency, founded in 1997. The agency is an active member of Ukrainian Advertising Coalition. Business profile: advertising and events (B2B, B2C, HR, branding, BTL, PR and media), advertising production (video and audio, POS-materials, exhibition equipment and stands, TV studios, print production). The company organized annual meetings of the Board of Governors of EBRD in Kyiv. The agency received over 40 international and national awards, including the Grand Prix of Kyiv International Advertising Festival (2001), 9 top positions in Moscow, Kazan and Kyiv international advertising festivals, 8 second places, 1 third place, and 8 finalist titles.

Atlant UMC is registered as a publishing house (certificate of registration in Public Register of publishing business entities DK No. 1918). Since 1997, it has published hundreds of books and magazines. Its book products are medical, scientific and fiction literature. A peculiarity of the house is its editions on art, comprising over 500 booklets, catalogues and albums of contemporary Ukrainian artists.

The major book project is an extensive edition of "Decorative art of Ukraine of the end of XXth century. The 200 names" (2002). For the first time during the years of independence, one book managed to present the creative work of 200 best artists of the country. The album-catalogue gained a top position in the rating "The Book of the year 2003" (won "Business card" nomination, and got the second place in Grand Prix). The author of the idea became the winner of the Shevchenko National Prize (2006).

Another significant book project was a big album-catalogue "Ivan Marchuk" (2004). The book illustrates all stages of the artist's oeuvre. Other distinguished photo albums are "Den. Photo 1999–2003" (2003), "Shot by shot: Kira Muratova. The chronicle of one movie" (2007), "Kyiv — city of chestnuts" (2007), art albums "Anatoly Kryvolap. Structures" (2009, under the aegis of the National Art Museum of Ukraine) and "Kyiv museum of Russian art" (2009, 4 types of cover).

The house has published albums of Igor Gorin (1999), Olga Antonenko (2004), Eduard Belsky (2004, 2006), Maria Prymachenko (2004), Eugen Derevianko (2005). Albums of Ivan Marchuk (2004, 2005, 2008), Oleksiy Vladimirov (2005, 2012), Anatoly Kryvolap (2006, 2008, 2009), Volodymyr Budnikov (2007, 2010) were published in different editions and series.

The house has published 5 album series. The series "Painting" includes 9 albums: on Anatoly Kryvolap (2006, 2008), Igor Yeliseyev (2006), Volodymyr Budnikov (2007, 2010), Ivan Marchuk (2008), Galyna Neledva (2009), Victor Ryzhikh (2009) and Matviy Vaisberg (2010). The series "Painting. Gesso" is represented by Leonid Bernat (2006) and Oleksiy Malykh (2007), the series "Painting. Graphics" is represented by Olexander Babak (2008), the series "Drawing" — by Olexander Sukholit (2010), the series "Sculpture" — by Oleksiy Vladimirov (2012). Art publications went out in Ukrainian, Russian and English.

=== Re!Zoni magazine ===
Re!Zoni magazine was published in 2001. Its founder and publisher is Litton publishing house (with its president Yuri Komelkov). The Russian title of the magazine stands for "advertisement areas". There were 3 issues of the magazine. It is a full-colour glossy magazine of 72–80-pages. It is a Russian-language magazine. Professional edition for participants of the Ukrainian advertising market.

=== Aura magazine ===
Aura art magazine was published in 2007–2009 (ISSN 1996-5206). Its founder and editor-in-chief is Yuri Komelkov. There were 7 issues of the magazine (No. 1 in 2007, No. 1–4 in 2008 and No. 1–2 in 2009). It's a full-color glossy magazine, of 116–124 pages. The majority of its articles are written in Russian, some articles are in Ukrainian. The magazine specializes in fine and decorative art.

The magazine is characterized by high informative value, popular presentation style and high quality illustrations. The list of authors includes the art collector Igor Dychenko, the TV journalist Yuri Makarov, curator Olga Lopukhova. One of the central columns is "Golden collection", dedicated to the best artists. Three major art museums of the country — the National Art Museum of Ukraine, the Museum of Western and Oriental Art and the Kyiv National Museum of Russian Art — have become partners of the magazine.

=== Cultprostir Internet platform ===
The CultAura foundation was established upon Yuri Komelkov's initiative in 2013. It serves "to renovate due consideration and attitude to culture in all population segments and all institutions". The Culprostir platform is a working tool of the foundation.

Cultprostir is aimed at becoming: 1) a reliable source of information on culture; 2) a rating panel; 3) a company to organize and realize system projects in the sphere of culture; 4) an active discussion platform. The new mass media platform was launched on 1 July 2014. Editorial copies are published synchronously in Russian and Ukrainian. The staff of the online media outlet comprises 7 people. By January 2015, the audience of Cultprostir amounted to over 100.000 readers monthly and 9000 subscribers in Facebook.

== Gallery activity ==
=== The Triptych gallery ===
Yuri Komelkov's gallery activity started with his purchasing the Triptych gallery (2003).

It's the first private gallery in the capital, founded in 1988 by 5 co-founders (Olexander Milovzorov, Volodymyr Isupov, Nelli Isupova, Nataliya Pikush and Nina Lapchik), artists, who set the central focus of its activity (fine and decorative art). For its popularity among artists, the writer Andriy Kurkov called it "the cornerstone of Andriyivskyy Descent". Its exhibitions got into the headlines. For instance, Den covered Lyudmila Bruyevich's exhibition, Zerkalo Nedeli wrote about Nelli Isupova's exhibition. The gallery exhibitions were also covered in foreign reports. Latvian daily Diena (Riga) announced Yanis Meletskis' exhibition, which was held under the aegis of Embassy of Latvia in Ukraine (1998).

At the moment of its being purchased, the gallery had a rich history but was in a poor condition. The new owner of the gallery restored the building and performed a full rebranding of the gallery. The institution started hosting regular expositions, participating in international projects, organizing annual plein-air events and publishing artists' catalogues. Fine arts (painting, sculpture, graphics) have become the main focus of the gallery. It was the first time that cutting-edge business technologies were used in the gallery activity of the capital. The large-scale work commenced by the owner of the gallery was aimed at creating Ukrainian business elite's demand for works of art.

2004 was a starting point for a series of grand projects characterized by a synthesis of publishing and gallery components. The book "Decorative art of Ukraine of the end of XXth century. The 200 names" was the first stage of the like-named project. The second stage was represented by the exhibition "The contemporary professional decorative art. Image transformation" in the Ukrainian House (2003). Over 1000 exhibits were displayed there. It was the most attended artistic event of the year. The art project was under the patronage of the president of Ukraine (2003). The final third stage was realized at the international level. It was presented in Paris by an exhibition at UNESCO headquarters, at festivities dedicated to the 50th anniversary of Ukrainian full membership in UNESCO (2004). The event was highly appraised by the Director-General of UNESCO, Kōichirō Matsuura, in his letter to the President of Ukraine. The project "200 names" travelled around Western Europe (France, Belgium, Netherlands).

To commemorate the 20th anniversary of the Chernobyl disaster, there was created an art project entitled "Bridge" — two like-named exhibitions in Kyiv and Paris, at UNESCO headquarters (France, 2006). The Triptych gallery represented Ukraine at one of the largest art fairs of Europe "Art Karlsruhe" (Karlsruhe, Germany; 2006). For several years the gallery participated in the International Contemporary Art Fair "Art-Manezh" (Moscow, Russia; 2006–2010).The gallery was represented at the International Artistic Forum "Art Vilnius '09" (Vilnius, Lithuania; 2009). It also took part in a major European art fair "20th Istanbul Art Fair" (Istanbul, Turkey; 2010).

The gallery also participated in domestic events, such as "Art Kyiv Contemporary" (Kyiv, 2006–2014), "Actual art week 2010" (Lviv).

The first artistic plein-air of the Triptych, entitled "The Glass House" (2003) was held in the Crimea, at Cape Aya. The second and the third plein-air events were held in Sozopol (Bulgaria, 2005–2006), in the territory of the former ancient Greek colony Apollonia Pontica. The third plain-air was attended by 15 artists. The results of the plein-air events were covered in catalogues.

After the presentation of the album-catalogue "Ivan Marchuk", the Triptych gallery hosted the largest exhibition of the artist's works, which occupied four floors of the Ukrainian House (2005). In 2013 the gallery hosted "Small sculpture salon", which exhibited 104 compositions by 25 sculptors.

The expositions were quite popular with central periodicals. For instance, Den wrote about varnishing days of such artists as Petro Bevza, Katerina Kosyanenko, Mykola Muravsky, Yana Katsuba, Vladyslav Shereshevsky, Oksana Stratiychuk, Ivan Marchuk. Khreschatik published reports on expositions of Vachagan Norazyan, Borys Firtsak, Matviy Vaisberg, Glib Vysheslavsky and Vira Vaisberg. Kommersant Ukraina wrote about Zviad Gogolauri's exhibition. Kapital announced Anatoly Kryvolap's varnishing day. Gazeta po Ukrainski published report on festivities dedicated to 25th anniversary of the gallery.

The Triptych gallery became a subject of academic studies. Oleg Minko's exhibition was considered in the collection of scientific papers of the Modern Art Research Institute of Ukrainian Academy of Arts. The exposition activity of the gallery is also mentioned in foreign catalogues, published in Poland (Lublin), Turkey (Istanbul).

=== Art-Blues Gallery ===
The company Art-Blues was established by Yuri Komelkov in 2002. It is a member of a business-related group, a group of companies called Foxtrot. The contemporary art gallery Art-Blues named after the company's owner, was founded in 2004. Its activity is coincident with that of the Triptych.

== Art collection ==
Yuri Komelkov has been collecting art objects since 1999. The total amount of the collection items is over 1000. The collection comprises pictures, sculptures, graphics and fine and decorative art objects.

The collection comprises works of contemporary Ukrainian artists. Painting is represented by monocollections of Anatoly Kryvolap, Ivan Marchuk, Petro Lebedynets, Matviy Vaisberg, Volodymyr Budnikov, Vladyslav Shereshevsky, Victor Ryzhikh, Galyna Neledva, Sergiy Gai, Borys Buryak, Olexander Zhivotkov, Mykola Zhuravel, Olexander Babak, Oleksiy Litvinenko, Eduard Belsky, Oksana Stratiychuk, Roman Romanyshyn, Oleg Denysenko, Mykhailo Demtsu, Borys Egiazaryan, Vachagan Norazyan.

The collection also includes monocollections by sculpturers Olexander Sukholit (over 40 works), Oleksiy Vladimirov, Mykola Bilyk. There are also objects of arts made of ceramics, metal, wood, textile (tapestries, carpets, batik) and glass.

Annually, a part of the collection was exhibited in the Triptych gallery (2003–2014). To celebrate the 25th anniversary of the gallery, there was published a jubilee series of postcards with reproductions of 32 most popular contemporary Ukrainian artists, sculptors and graphic artists from Yuri Komelkov's private collection. The series had a circulation of 320.000 copies. The postcards were meant for visitors of major Kyiv exhibitions.

== Patronage ==
Yuri Komelkov initiated and curated three sculpture plein-air events — in Vyshhorod (2008, the event dedicated to the 1020th anniversary of Christianization of Kyivan Rus'), in Bucha (2009) and Irpin (2014). The art director of the plein-air events was Mykola Bilyk. On 18 October 2014 a garden of plein-air sculptures was opened to the public in the center of Irpin. The results of the plein-air events were covered in catalogues.

Yuri Komelkov took part in a charity marathon dedicated to Saint Nicholas' day. The marathon called "The miracle begins" was held on the Inter channel (2014). It initiated a fundraising campaign to acquire medical equipment for newborn babies.

== Literature ==
=== Book editions ===
1. Igor V. Gorin. Painting and drawing. [Kyiv : Publishing house Atlant UMS, 1999]. 63 p. (in Ukrainian and English)
2. Decorative art of Ukraine of the end of XXth century. The 200 names : album-catalogue. [Kyiv : CJSC Atlant UMS, 2002]. 511 p. ISBN 966-95919-2-9. (in Ukrainian and English)
3. [Den. Photo] 1999–2003. [Kyiv : Atlant UMS, 2003]. 79 p. (in Ukrainian and English)
4. Edward Belsky : [album]. [Kyiv : Publishing house Atlant UMS, 2004]. 47 p. (in Ukrainian and English)
5. Ivan Marchuk : album-catalogue. Kyiv : CJSC "Atlant UMS", 2004. 519 p. ISBN 966-95919-7-X. (in Ukrainian and English)
6. Марія Примаченко. Живопис. З приватної колекції К. А. Бондарева. К. : [ТОВ «Атлант ЮЕмСі»], 2004. 43 с. (in Ukrainian)
7. Ольга Антоненко. Живопись. [К. : Изд-во «Atlant UMS»], 2004. 22 с. (in Russian)
8. Alexey Vladimirov. Sculpture. Kyiv : Atlant UMS, 2005. 83 p. ISBN 966-95919-9-6. (in Russian and English)
9. Eugeni Derevyanko. Sculptor. [Kyiv : Publishing Atlant UMS, 2005]. 39 p. (in Ukrainian and English)
10. Ivan Marchuk. Creative period 1965–2005. [Kyiv : CJSC Atlant UMS, 2005]. 28 p. (in Ukrainian and English)
11. Edward Belsky : [album]. [Kyiv : Publishing house Atlant UMS, 2006]. 47 p. (in Ukrainian and English)
12. Donin. Кадр за кадром: Кира Муратова. Хроника одного фильма. К. : ООО «Атлант-ЮЭмСи», 2007. 119 с. ISBN 978-966-8968-11-2. (in Russian)
13. Kyiv — city of chestnuts : photoalbum. Kyiv : LTD Atlant UMS, 2007. 175 p. ISBN 978-966-8968-10-5. (in Ukrainian and English)
14. Anatoly Kryvolap. Structures. [Kyiv : CJSC Atlant UMS, 2009]. [105] p. (in Ukrainian and English)
15. Kyiv Museum of Russian Art. [Kyiv : CJSC Atlant UMS], 2009. 295 p. ISBN 978-966-8968-25-9. (in Ukrainian, Russian, and English)
16. Благодійний аукціон сучасного мистецтва. [К. : ТОВ «Атлант ЮЕмСі»], 2012. 55 с. (in Ukrainian)
17. Скульптурний пленер «Мій Ірпінь». Мистецтво твориться на ваших очах. Ірпінь, 2014. 19 с. (in Ukrainian)

=== The series "Painting" ===
1. Anatoli Kryvolap. 2000–2005. Kyiv : CJSC Atlant UMS, 2006. [64] p. (Painting). (in Ukrainian and English)
2. Igor Yeliseyev : [album]. Kyiv : CJSC Atlant UMS, 2006. [64] p. (Painting). (in Ukrainian and English)
3. Volodymyr Budnikov : [album]. Kyiv : CJSC Atlant UMS, 2007. [153] p. (Painting). (in Ukrainian and English)
4. Anatoli Kryvolap. Ukrainian motive. Peace. 2005–2008 : album. Kyiv : CJSC Atlant UMS, 2008. [83] p. (Painting). ISBN 978-966-8968-21-1. (in Ukrainian and English)
5. Ivan Marchuk : album. Kyiv : CJSC Atlant UMS, 2008. [135] p. (Painting). ISBN 978-966-8968-22-8. (in Ukrainian and English)
6. Galyna Neledva : album. Kyiv : CJSC Atlant UMS, 2009. 79 p. (Painting). (in Ukrainian and English)
7. Viktor Ryzhikh : album. Kyiv : CJSC Atlant UMS, 2009. 79 p. (Painting). (in Ukrainian and English)
8. Matvey Vaisberg : album. Kyiv : CJSC Atlant UMS, 2010. 79 p. (Painting). (in Ukrainian and English)
9. Volodymyr Budnikov. Landscapes 1968–2008 : album. Kyiv : CJSC Atlant UMS, 2010. 119 p. (Painting). (in Ukrainian and English)

=== Other series of books ===
1. Leonid Bernat : [album]. Kyiv : CJSC Atlant UMS, 2006. [58] p. (Painting. Gesso). (in Ukrainian and English)
2. Olexiy Malykh : [album]. Kyiv : CJSC Atlant UMS, 2007. [64] p. (Painting. Gesso). (in Ukrainian and English)
3. Olexandr Babak : [album]. Kyiv : CJSC Atlant UMS, 2008. [103] p. (Painting. Graphics). (in Ukrainian and English)
4. Olexander Sykholit : album. Kyiv : CJSC Atlant UMS, 2010. 63 p. (Drawing). (in Ukrainian and English)
5. Alexey Vladimirov. Sculpture. Kyiv : CJSC Atlant UMS, 2012. 151 p. (Sculpture). (in Russian and English)

=== Interview ===
1. Галерист Юрий Комельков: «Быть игроком на рынке, которого нет, непросто» / [беседовала] О. Островерх // Сейчас. 2005. № 136. (in Russian)
2. «Спілкуючись із мистецтвом, людина радикально змінюється». Галерист Юрій Комельков / [інтерв'ю] М. Токмак // День. 2009. № 147. С. 22. (in Ukrainian)
3. И то, и другое, и третье… / беседу вел Д. Котин // Народний депутат. 2013. № 5. С. 142–144. (in Russian)
4. «Триптих»: життя після… життя. Після дворічної перерви відновила свою роботу одна з найдавніших галерей Києва / [інтерв'ю] І. Гордійчук // День. 2013. № 71. (in Ukrainian)
5. У розвинених країнах міністр культури — третя людина в уряді. У нас — остання / [розмову з Ю. Комельковим вели] О. Богачевська, О. Павлова // Країна. 2013. № 41. (in Ukrainian)
