= Three Handed Mother of God Church =

Church building in Tallinn, Estonia

Coordinates: 59.4413°N 24.7459°E

- Tallinna Kolmekäelise Jumalaema kirik
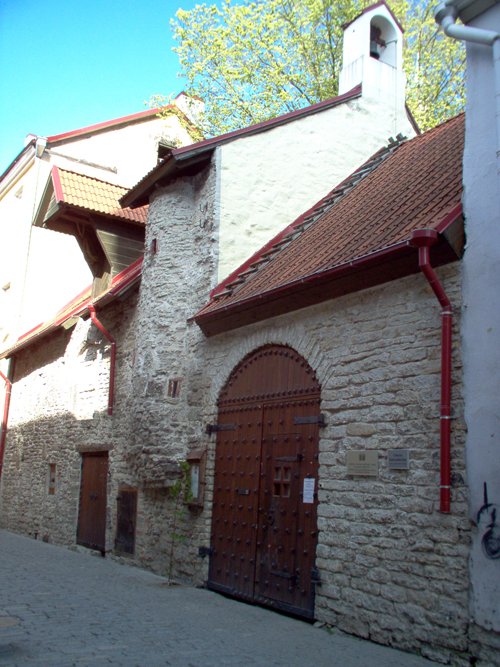
- Three Handed Mother of God Church
- Location: Tallinn
- Country: Estonia
- Denomination: Ukrainian Greek Catholic Church

The Three Handed Mother of God Church (Estonian: Tallinna Kolmekäelise Jumalaema kirik) is a parish of the Ukrainian Greek Catholic Church located in Tallinn, Estonia. The Evangelical Lutheran Church of Estonia managed the building between 1994 and 1997.

In late 1997, the church was destroyed by an arson attack. On 14 October 2000, the church was restored and consecrated in honor of the Virgin Mary. The ceremony was celebrated by Archbishop Ljubomõr Guzar of the Ukrainian Greek Catholic Church. The church has paintings by the artist Lviv Petro Gumenjuk, and the interior was designed and built by one of his assistants Anatoli Ljutjuk. All Masses are celebrated in the Ukrainian language.

== See also ==
- Catholicism in Estonia
