= Oksana Madarash =

Ukrainian conductor

- Born: September 12, 1969 (age 56); Buchach, Ukraine
- Education: Tchaikovsky National Music Academy of Ukraine
- Occupation: Conductor
- Website: oksanamadarash.com

Madarash Oksana Stepanivna (Ukrainian: Мадараш Оксана Степанівна; born September 12, 1969) conductor, art director, teacher, Honored Artist of Ukraine (2008).

== Education ==
Received higher musical education at the Tchaikovsky National Music Academy of Ukraine:

- 2002-2005 – Post Graduate degree in Opera and Symphony Conducting, assistant- internship at the Opera and Symphony Conducting Department, class of People's Artist of Ukraine, professor E. Duschenko.
- 1999 – Opera and Symphony Conducting, class of People's Artist of Ukraine, professor E. Duschenko,
- 1994 – Choral Conducting, class of People's Artist of Ukraine, professor V. Petrichenko and optional classes at the Opera and Symphony Conducting Department, class of People's Artist of Ukraine and Russian Federation, professor V. Kozhuhar

Graduated from the Conducting and Choral Department of the Mykolayiv State Higher Music College, (1989, class of teacher L. Lakiza).

== Conducting career ==
Since 2002 – conductor-director of the Kiev National Academic Theater of Operetta and art director and conductor of the chamber orchestra of young students of the faculty of musical art of the Kyiv Children's Academy of Arts, the winner of the 1st International Competition named after Stankovich.

Oksana directed and conducted new concert version of G. Bizet's "Carmen", J. Strauss "Die Fledermaus", G. Donizetti "The Bell", F. Loewe "My Fair Lady", J.S. Bach "The Coffee Cantata", E. Kalman "The Violet of Montmartre", M. Arkas "Kateryna" and others.

She assisted as a music director and conductor for the following works at the Kiev National Academic Theater of Operetta: the annual symphonic concert "Strauss in the Operetta", the Art Evening "Ferenc Lehar", the Evening of Hungarian Music "The Pearl of the Danube", "Symphony Blues Cocktail", "Vivat, Offenbach!", " Vivat, L'Operette ", “ The Best Of Opera Masterpieces ” and others.

Conductor of performances: G. Rossini's "Barber of Seville", G. Verdi's "Rigoletto", P. Tchaikovsky's "Eugene Onegin", S. Rachmaninov's "Aleko", C. Orff's "Carmina Burana", E. Kalman's "Silva" and “Mr. X”, J. Strauss "Gypsy Baron", F. Lehár's "The Count of Luxembourg", J. Offenbach's "Dinner with the Italians", I. Poklad's "Such Jewish Happiness", M. Lysenko's "May Night", M. Samoilov's "The American Comedy" and others.

Cooperation with orchestras: National Symphony Orchestra of Ukraine, Symphonic Orchestra Programs of the Kyiv National Academic Operetta Theater, Symphony Orchestra of the Kaunas State Musical Theatre, St. Petersburg Festival Orchestra (Russian Federation), Symphony Orchestra of the Ternopil Regional Philharmonic, Symphony Orchestra of the Mykolaiv Regional Department of Culture, Chamber Orchestra "Ars-Nova" of the Mykolaiv Regional Philharmonic, orchestra of the Symphonic Conducting Chair at the Tchaikovsky National Music Academy of Ukraine in Kyiv.

Participation in international festivals: "Operetta in the Kaunas Castle" (Lithuania), "O - Fest" (Kyiv, Bucha), "French Spring" (Kyiv), "Golden applause of Bukovina" (Chernivtsi), "Melpomene of Tavria" (Kherson), "Gogol Fest" (Poltava) and others.

Tour activities: performances in cities both in Ukraine and abroad.

In addition to her successful and busy career, Oksana participated in numerous prestigious musical contests, including: A. Pedrotti International Contest for Symphonic Conductors (Trento, Italy), V. Jordania International Competition for Symphonic Conductors (Kharkiv, Ukraine), Turchak National Contest of Symphonic Conductors (Kyiv, Ukraine) where she received a special prize "Rose of Hope" for the best performance of compulsory work (M. Ravel, Suite # 2 "Daphnis e Chloe"), All-Union Competition of Young Choir Conductors (II prize, Mykolayiv, Ukraine).

In 1994 - 2002 worked at the National Honored Academic Chapel of Ukraine "Dumka" (Kyiv, Ukraine).
Member of the jury of contests: I and II All-Ukrainian open contests of choir conductors "Solar Stream" (Mykolaiv, 2015-2016), IV International competition of vocal ensembles named after Bortnyansky (Kyiv, 2014) and others.
Oksana Madarash participated in scientific and practical conferences, including: "Traditional Culture of Ukraine of the XXI Century "(2015) and others.

== Honours and awards ==
- 1998 – Special prize "Rose of Hope" at the 2nd S.Turchak National Contest of Symphony Conductors
- 2003 – Diploma, Laureate of M. Arkas Theatre Award (“Katerina”, opera)
- 2005 – Certificate of Honor by Cabinet of Ministers of Ukraine,
- 2008 – Honorary title "Honored Artist of Ukraine",
- 2019 – Honorary title "People's Artist of Ukraine"
