= Lyudmyla Lyatetska =

Ukrainian paediatrician and physician (1941–2020)

Hero of Ukraine Lyudmyla Lyatetska
- Born: Lyudmyla Volodymyrivna Lyatetska; 7 November 1941; Simferopol, Autonomous Republic of Crimea, Russian SFSR, Soviet Union
- Died: 16 June 2020 (aged 78); Kherson, Ukraine
- Occupations: Pediatrician, physician
- Years active: 1965–2020
- Awards: Order of the Badge of Honour; Order of the Red Banner of Labour; Honorary Diploma of the Cabinet of Ministers of Ukraine; Hero of Ukraine

Lyudmyla Volodymyrivna Lyatetska (Ukrainian: Людмила Володимирівна Лятецька; 7 November 1941 – 16 June 2020) was a Soviet and Ukrainian pediatrician and physician. She worked in healthcare institutions in Kherson as a otolaryngologist and later as deputy chief physician. Lyatetska was chief physician of the Central District Hospital in the village of Kalanchak between 1971 and 1981. She was later chief physician of the Kherson Children's Regional Hospital from 1981 until her retirement in 2015. Lyatetska was decorated with several state awards such as the Order of the Badge of Honour and the Order of the Red Banner of Labour. She was made a Hero of Ukraine in 2009.

== Biography ==
Lyatetska was born in the city of Simferopol in the Autonomous Republic of Crimea, on 7 November 1941. She was a 1965 graduate of the Medical Academy named after S.I. Georgievsky of Vernadsky CFU. Between 1965 and 1971, Lyatetska worked in healthcare institutions in Kherson as an otolaryngologist and later as deputy chief physician. From 1971 to 1981, she was the chief physician at the Central District Hospital in the village of Kalanchak in the Kherson Oblast.

She became chief physician of the Kherson Children's Regional Hospital in May 1981. From 1985 to 1998, Llyatetska worked as chair of the Kherson regional branch of the Children's Fund of Ukraine. She was also deputy chair of the Council of Chief Physicians of the Kherson Oblast and a deputy of the regional council of two convocations. Lyatetska was chair of the standing commission on health and social protection. She was a proxy for the presidential candidate Yulia Tymoshenko in the 2010 Ukrainian presidential election in Ukraine's 185th electoral district in the Kherson Oblast.

Lyatetska worked to better the quality of specialised care for children in Kherson Oblast, better the material base of the hospital, equip it with modern medical and diagnostic equipment, and oversaw the building of a neonatal centre. She was a contributor to the development of cardiac surgery, immunology, medical genetics, pediatrics neurosurgery and orthopedics. Lyatetska was also a contributor to the organising of specialised care for newborns and the creation of a system for its provision at both the district and regional levels, the introduction of new modern technologies in the process of treating and diagnosis. She oversaw a reduction in morality and infant morality and prioritised the provision of specialised assistance to rural residents, primarily in Kalanchak.

She was the author of the book Organization of neurological care for children in the Kherson region in 1995, Mistress of a large house in 1998, co-wrote Medical care for children in the Kherson region in terms of reforming the industry (for 2000–2004) in 2004 and co-authored Experience of watermelon pulp application in complex treatment of secondary chronic pyelonephritis in children and Experience in the use of immunoglobulins in the treatment of neuroinfections in newborns in 2006. She retired from work in June 2015 and died on 16 June 2020. Lyatetska was buried at Komyshan Cemetery. Tributes to her were paid at St. Catherine's Cathedral, Kherson.

== Awards ==
She received multiple state awards for her work. In 1976, Lyatetska received the Order of the Badge of Honour; the Badge "Excellence in Health Care" in 1978; the Order of the Red Banner of Labour in 1986; and the Merited Healthcare Worker of Ukraine "For significant contribution to the development of health care, the introduction of modern methods of diagnosis and treatment, high professional skills" in 1996. Lyatetska was given an Honorary Diploma of the Cabinet of Ministers of Ukraine "for significant personal contribution to the development of the health care system, organization and provision of medical care, introduction of new methods of diagnosis and treatment, high professionalism and conscientious work" in 1999; the Diploma of the Ministry of Health of Ukraine in 2002.

In 2003, she received the Gratitude of the Cabinet of Ministers of Ukraine; "Laureate of the Rating" of the International Academic Rating of Popularity "Golden Fortune" in 2004; and Diploma of the Presidium of the Federation of Trade Unions of Ukraine for winning second place in the All-Ukrainian competition for the best collective agreement for 2007. She was made a Hero of Ukraine by president Viktor Yanukovych "for outstanding personal merits before the Ukrainian state in the development of health care, the introduction of modern methods of diagnosis and treatment, many years of dedicated work" in August 2009. Lyateska was an honorary citizen of Kherson.

== Legacy ==
Sergey Yanovsky of Holos Ukrayiny wrote of Lyatetska: "she was also an extremely interesting interlocutor, who never avoided the opportunity to share the wisdom of life, to give good advice from the pages of the Voice of Ukraine, local publications." In June 2021, a granite bas-relief memorial plaque was dedicated to Lyateska and unveiled at the main entrance of the Kherson Regional Children's Clinical Hospital.
