= Leonid Burlachuk =

Ukrainian psychologist (1947–2022)

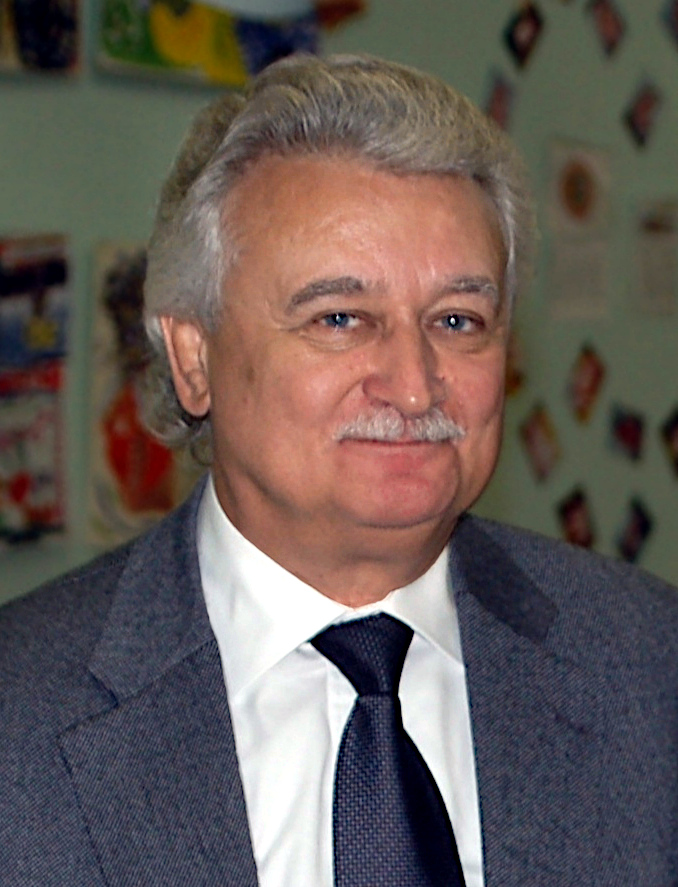
- Burlachuk in 2009
- Born: 1 January 1947; Leningrad, USSR
- Died: 26 November 2022 (aged 75)
- Education: Taras Shevchenko National University of Kyiv
- Occupation: Psychologist

Leonid Fokich Burlachuk (Ukrainian: Леонід Фокович Бурлачук; 1 January 1947 – 26 November 2022) was a Soviet and Ukrainian psychologist. Among his academic achievements belong: the Doctor of Sciences in Psychological Sciences (1990), professor (1992), academician of the National Academy of Educational Sciences of Ukraine (2010).

== Biography ==
Burlachuk was born on 1 January 1947, in Leningrad. His father, Foka Burlachuk (1914–1997), was a writer.

He studied at the Leningrad State University however subsequently transferred to the Kyiv State University, where in 1970 he graduated from the Psychology Department.

After graduation, he continued to work as an assistant, and later as an associate professor at the Department of Social and Pedagogical Psychology of the Kyiv State University. Later he became the head of the Department of Social and Pedagogical Psychology at the same university (1990-1992).

Together with Vadim Bleikher, he founded the Department of Psychodiagnostics and Medical (renamed to Clinical in 2008) Psychology. Burlachuk had been the head of the department since its inception in 1992. He had been the Dean of the Psychology Department in 2011–2012.

Also, he served as the president of the All-Ukrainian Psychodiagnostic Association and the National Psychological Association of Ukraine (2017-2020).

He died on 26 November 2022.

== Academic career ==
He studied psychodiagnostics, psychotherapy and clinical psychology. Initially, Burlachuk's area of interest included the study of patients with mental disorders. The scientist was one of the first in the Soviet Union to use the Rorschach test for diagnosis. In the second half of the 1980s, he began to study psychodiagnostics and apply it in clinical experience. He is the author of the theory of measured individuality.

In 1974, he defended his thesis on the subject “Features of perceptual activity of patients with epilepsy and schizophrenia with weakly structured visual stimulation”. In 1989, he defended his doctoral thesis on the subject "Psychodiagnostics of personality: conceptual apparatus and research methods". Burlachuk prepared his candidate thesis under the authority of psychologist Vadim Bleikher on the basis of material collected at the Kyiv Clinical (Psychoneurological) Hospital No.21. Due to the use of the Rorschach test in his work, Burlachuk faced difficulties in defending his thesis since "Western studies" were considered to be unacceptable in the USSR. Despite the Dissertation Council being partly prejudiced, Burlachuk managed to defend the work at the Leningrad Bekhterev Psychoneurological Research Institute. Modest Kabanov was the head of the Dissertation Council at that time.

He wrote more than 200 scientific papers, including reference dictionaries, textbooks and teaching aids. His "Dictionary-Guide to Psychodiagnostics" is the most famous one. Burlachuk created training courses and masterclasses written on the basis of clinical psychodiagnostics research. He was a member of the editorial councils of ten Ukrainian and four foreign periodicals on psychology. In 2008, Burlachuk together with partners founded "OS Ukraine”, which was the first Ukrainian publishing house of psychological tests.

Burlachuk prepared 40 candidates and 5 doctors of science. He was the chairman of the scientific and methodological commission on psychology at the Ministry of Science and Education of Ukraine. From 1991 to 2005, he had been chairman of the specialized commission for the defense of doctoral and master's theses in psychology at the Kyiv National University. He was also the head of international educational and scientific projects in psychology TEMPUS (1995-2000) and INTAS (1999-2003). He served as the head of the organizing committee of the international psychological conference "Psicon".

In 1992, he was elected a corresponding member, and later in 2010, a full member (Academy Fellow) of the National Academy of Educational Sciences of Ukraine. Since 1995, he had been a member of the International Test Commission. He was also a full member of the International Academy of Acmeological Sciences, the New York Academy of Sciences and the European Federation of Psychologists' Associations. Burlachuk was one of the founders of the Kyiv Institute of Modern Psychology and Psychotherapy and the Ukrainian school of archetypes.

== Awards ==
- Diploma of the Verkhovna Rada of Ukraine
