= Oleksandr Tolokonnikov =

Ukrainian photojournalist

- Олександр Толоконніков
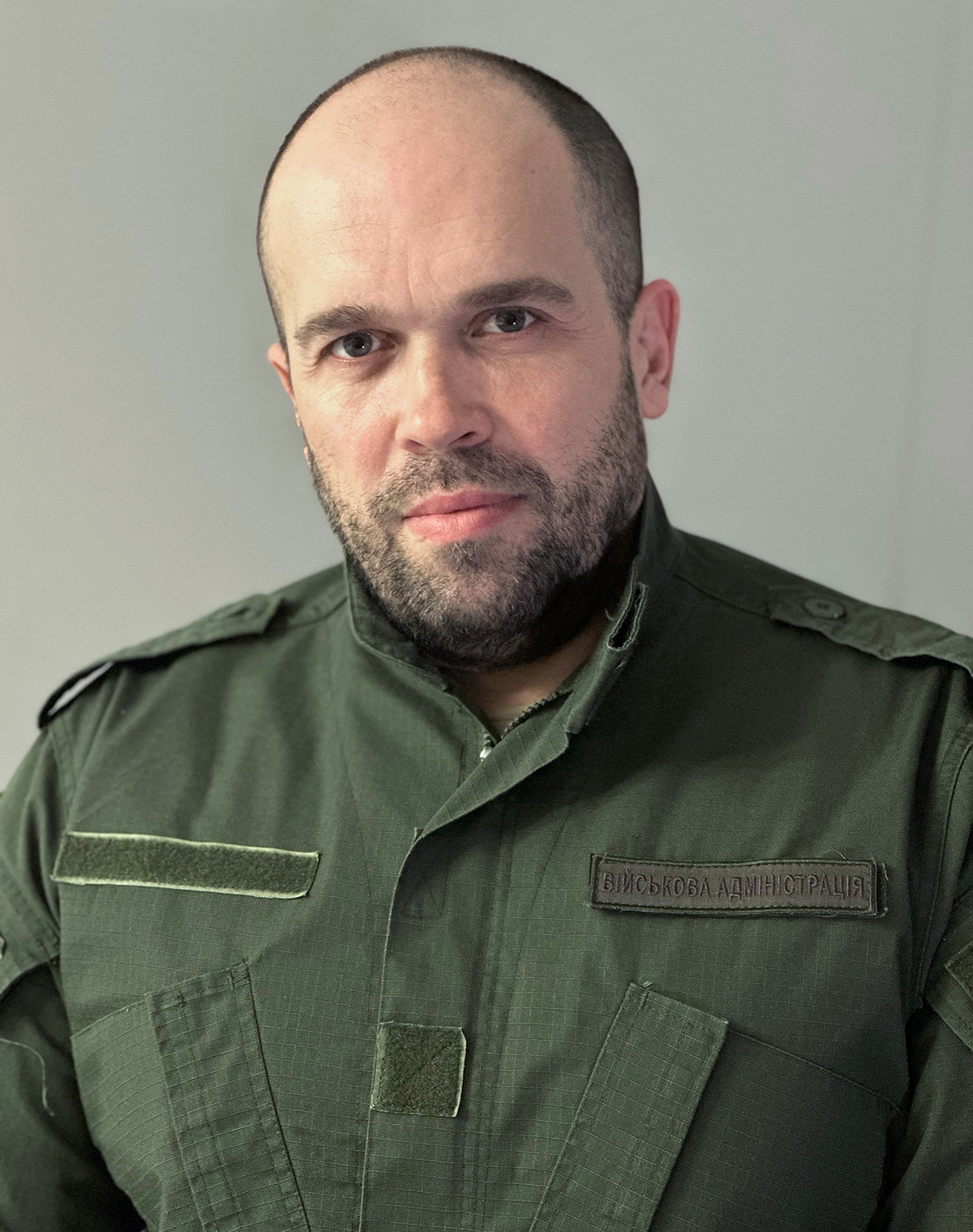
- Oleksandr Tolokonnikov, 2024
- Born: 21 September 1982 (age 43); Dnipro, Dnipropetrovsk Oblast, Ukraine
- Occupations: Photojournalist, Journalist

Oleksandr Tolokonnikov (Ukrainian: Олександр Толоконніков, born 1982, in Dnipro, Dnipropetrovsk Oblast, Ukraine is a Ukrainian photojournalist, journalist, media and social activist, Deputy Head of the Kherson Regional Military Administration.

== Biography ==
He graduated from Kryvyi Rih Economic Institute of Kyiv National Economic University, specializing in Law. (2011).

Editor at the television and radio company "Ukrainian-Polish Radio and Television "Commonwealth" (2014–2015).

Works in Ecuador (2016) and the United States (2018–2019), in graphic and media content creation companies.

Co-founder of the Public organization "Ukrainian Foundation For Community Development" (2013) and the Limited liability company "Centre For International Communication CIDEIPS" (2020).

Head of the Internal and Information Policy Department of the Kherson Regional Military Administration (from 2023 to June 2025).

Since 27 June 2025 — Deputy Head of the Kherson Regional State Administration for Digital Development, Information Policy, International Cooperation, and Coordination of International Technical Assistance.

On 29 October 2025, Oleksandr Tolokonnikov participated in the thematic debate "The Role of Ukraine's Regional Authorities in Facing War-Related Challenges" at the 49th Session of the Congress of Local and Regional Authorities of the Council of Europe.

On 18 May 2026, Oleksandr Tolokonnikov spoke at the international transport conference "Cross-border Connections in Northern Europe", held in Oslo (Norway) on the initiative of the Scandria Alliance and the Eastern Norway County Network.

On 19 May 2026, in the city of Tønsberg (Norway), together with representatives of the Kherson Regional Military Administration, he held a security conference on crisis management and community resilience under martial law.

During a working visit to London (United Kingdom) in May 2026, he spoke in the House of Commons of the UK Parliament during the public discussion "Kherson Today: Civilian Resilience in Wartime".

He also took part in the panel discussion "The Humanitarian Effort in Ukraine", held at the Frontline Club.

Oleksandr joined the public discussion "Governing Under Fire – How to Run a City at War", organized by Oaklin together with Medical Life Lines Ukraine.

Since the beginning of the Russian invasion of Ukraine (from 2022), and the Russian occupation of Kherson Oblast it has been filming and documenting Russian crimes and military events. One of the permanent speakers of the Ukrainian telethon "United News".

Oleksandr Tolokonnikov's photo exhibitions are exhibited in Ukraine and abroad.

Gives interviews and comments to the largest news publications of Ukraine and the world.

Since 2025, he has been the author of a number of publications for the UkraineAlert platform of the Atlantic Council analytical center on the issues of the Russian-Ukrainian war and the situation in the Kherson region.

Oleksandr Tolokonnikov is the co-author and initiator of Unbreakable Kherson, a book prepared jointly with Oleksandr Prokudin. The publication documents the Kherson region's experience in crisis management during Russia's full-scale invasion of Ukraine and was presented on 24 June 2026 at the Ukraine Recovery Conference 2026 with the support of Howard G. Buffett and the German Marshall Fund of the United States.

== Awards ==
- Honorary Diploma of the Verkhovna Rada of Ukraine (2023).
- The 3rd Class of the Order of Merit (2024).
