= Pedrotti =

Pedrotti is an Italian surname. Notable people with the surname include:

- Antonio Pedrotti (1901–1975), Italian conductor and composer
- Carlo Pedrotti (1817–1893), Italian conductor and composer
- Kevin Pedrotti (1948–2011), Australian rules footballer
