= Peter Loboda =

Museum founder

Peter G. Loboda is a researcher of ancient history of the Northern Black Sea Region and antique numismatics. He is the founder and director of the Odesa Numismatics Museum.

Loboda graduated from the Odesa Marine Academy and worked as a naval officer. Since 1970 he has worked on the seagoing ships of the Black Sea Shipping Company all over the world.

Loboda is an hereditary numismatist. He concerned himself with numismatics since the 1960s, paying special attention to antique coins. He is the author of five books and numerous articles of numismatics of the Northern Black Sea Region, and a participant and lecturer in many scientific conferences. He founded the Odesa Numismatics Museum in 1999 and the Gallery "Monetary Yard" in 2004. Loboda donated his collection to the museum.

Loboda is a participant in Odesa's political life. Since 1991 he has been the President of the Odesa City Collectors' Society. He was the Deputy of Odesa City Council (1994–2002), the Adviser of City Council on cultural relations (2002–2010), Chairman of Board of Guardians of Odesa Regional Scientific Library named after M.Grushevsky (1997–2000) and Museum "Christian Odesa" (since 2004).

Loboda is the author and presenter of popular TV historical projects: "World of Collections", "About what the coin has told", "Projection of Time". He is also the author and presenter of youth TV program "Club of Discoverers". He meets and talks with schoolchildren and students about history of the Ukrainian State and history of Hero-city Odesa on a regular basis.

== Awards ==
Loboda has received government awards of Ukraine, Russia and Commonwealth of Independent States. He is the winner of Competition "Your names, Odesa" (2003). Honourable Medals of Odesa City Mayor (2009, 2011). Rewarded with Honourable Diploma of Ukrainian Parliament "For Special Services For Ukrainian People" (2004). Honorary Title "Deserved Culture Worker of Ukraine" (2009). Honourable Medal of Odesa Council of the Peace "For Humanism and Peacemaking" (2011). The winner of gallery of honourable philanthropists of Odesa Region "People of Generous Hearts" (2012). His educational and humanitarian activity was marked by awards of the Ukrainian Orthodox Church, various Cossack's and public organizations.
