= Volodymyr Turkevych =

Ukrainian scientist

Volodymyr Zinoviiovych Turkevych Владимир Зиновьевич Туркевич
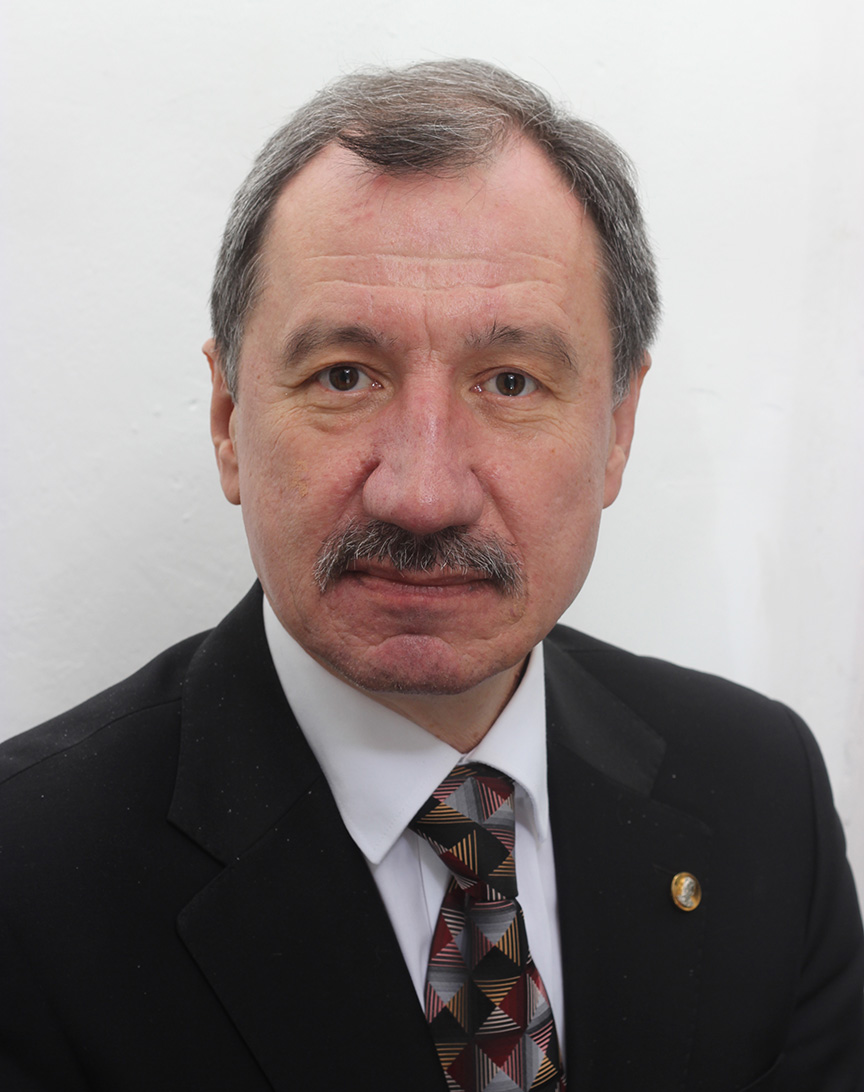
- Born: 9 June 1958 (age 68); Kyiv
- Citizenship: Ukraine
- Education: Kyiv Polytechnic Institute
- Known for: Director of the V.N. Bakul Institute for Superhard Materials of NAS of Ukraine (since 2014)
- Awards: Honorary Diploma of the Verkhovna Rada of Ukraine (2011), State Prize of Ukraine in Science and Technology (2012)
- Scientific career
- Workplaces: Institute for Superhard materials National Academy of Sciences of Ukraine

Volodymyr Zinoviiovych Turkevych (Ukrainian: Володимир Зіновійович Туркевич; born 9 June 1958) is a scientist in the field of study of the physicochemical aspects of the superhard materials synthesis under high pressures and temperatures, the study of the thermodynamics and kinetics crystallization of diamond and cubic boron nitride at high pressures and temperatures, thermophysical instruments development. Doctor of Science (1996), professor (2011), corresponding member of National Academy of Sciences of Ukraine (2009).

== Biography ==
Born 9 June 1958 in Kyiv, Ukraine. In 1981 he was graduated from the Heat and Power Faculty of Kyiv Polytechnic Institute (modern name - National Technical University of Ukraine "Kyiv Polytechnic Institute"), his specialty was an engineer - thermal physicist. In 1987 he defended the Ph.D. thesis in physical and mathematical sciences (Institute of Metal Physics of NAS of Ukraine) and in 1996 the Doctor of Chemical Science thesis (Taras Shevchenko National University of Kyiv). Since 2009 – corresponding member of the NAS of Ukraine. In 2011 he was entitled as professor.

=== Activity ===
- Institute for Superhard materials of NAS Ukraine (1981 – till to present time).
- Since 2015 – Director.

and:

- Invited researcher (1995), University of Bonn, Germany;
- Invited researcher (1998, 1999), University of Paderborn, Germany;
- Invited researcher (2001), JAERI, Spring-8 in Harima, Japan;
- Invited researcher (2003), NIMS, Tsukuba, Japan;
- Invited Professor (2003- 2007), the University-13, Paris, France;
- Guest Professor (2011- till to present time), University of Lund, Sweden;
- Professor (combined job), Physics Department, Taras Shevchenko National University of Kyiv (2003- 2007);
- Professor (combined job), Engineering and Physics Department, KPI (2007 – till to present time);
- Vice Editor-in-Chief of the journal Superhard Materials (1997);
- Deputy Academic-Secretary of the Department of Physical and Technical Problems of Materials Science (2004);
- Head of the Scientific Council of the Institute for Superhard Materials of NAS of Ukraine (2014).

== Honors and awards ==
Prize winner

- Prize of I.Frantsevich of National Academy of Sciences of Ukraine (1999).
- Medal of the NAS of Ukraine "For scientific achievements " (2008)
- Honorary Diploma of the Verkhovna Rada of Ukraine (2011).
- State Prize of Ukraine in Science and Technology (2012).

== Publications ==
- Monograph – 6;
- Textbook – 1;
- Articles -125;
- Inventions (patents, certificate of authorship) – 6.
