= Anatoli Ljutjuk =

Ukrainian-born Estonian cultural and public figure

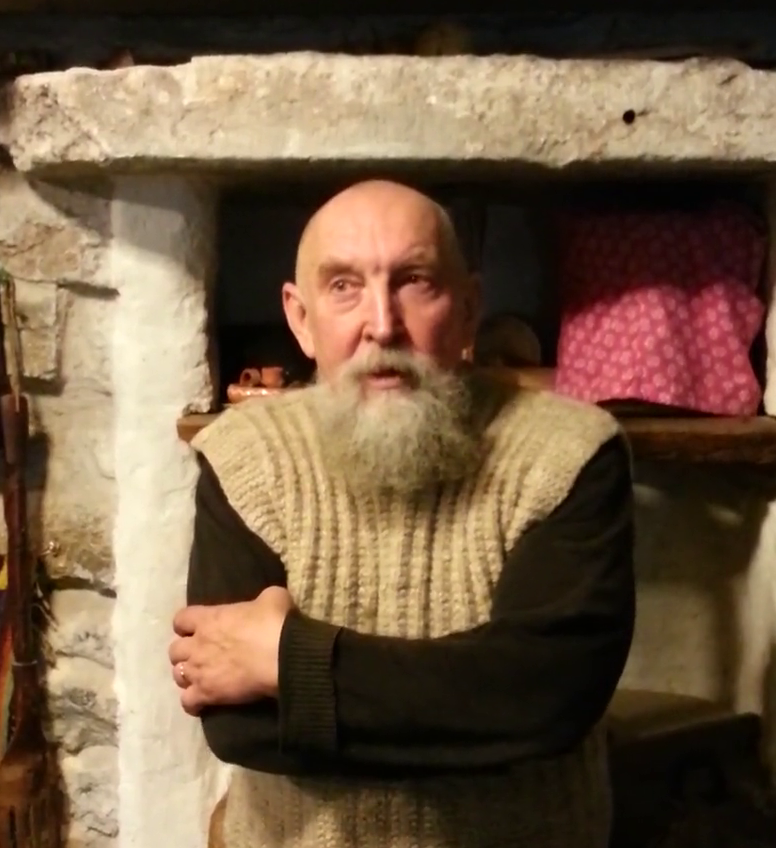
- Born: 1947 (age 78–79); Velyki Birky, Ukrainian Soviet Socialist Republic, USSR
- Occupations: friar, artist
- Known for: Founding Ukrainian Cultural Center, handmade books

Anatoli Kuzmich Ljutjuk (Ukrainian: Анатолій Кузьмич Лютюк; born 1947) is a Ukrainian-Estonian friar and artist of collaborative handmade books. He lives in Tallinn, Estonia, where he founded the city's Ukrainian Greek Catholic Church and the Ukrainian Cultural Center.

== Ukrainian Cultural Center ==
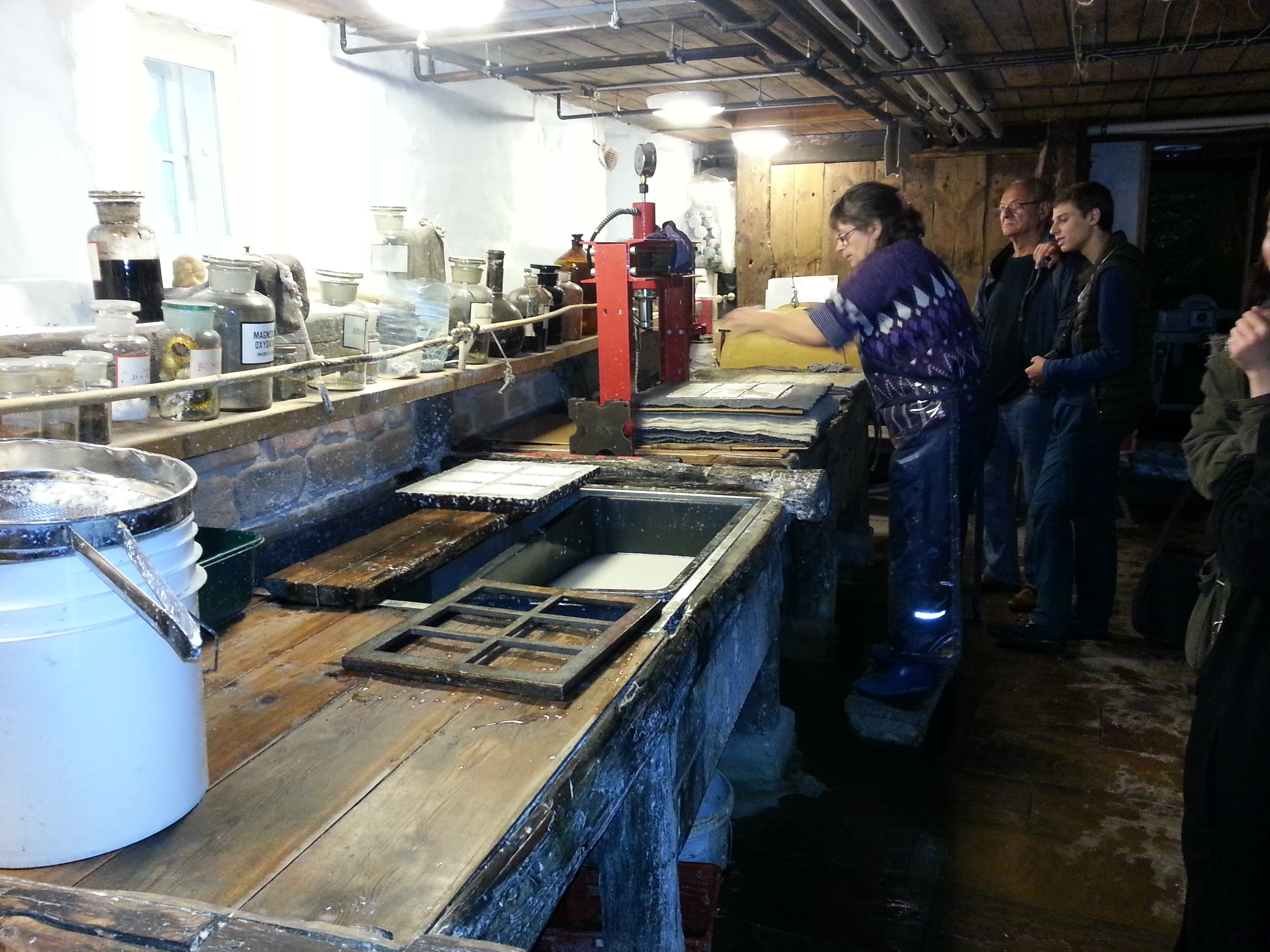
Making paper in the Ukrainian Cultural Center

The Ukrainian Cultural Center is located in Tallinn, Estonia. Labora is the name of its studios, which include a calligraphy school, print shop, and handmade paper mill.

== Artistic works ==
In the early 2000s, Ljutjuk began to pray for the animals he saw in his Tallinn church courtyard and started making icons of Estonia's endangered species. In 2006, Estonian poet Timo Maran visited the Ukrainian Cultural Center and saw Ljutjuk's artwork. Maran was inspired to write poems about the endangered animals. Maran's poems, new illustrations by Lujutjuk's son, Nestor Lujutjuk, and calligrapher Heino Kivihall became Poetics of Endangered Species: Estonia.This was followed by Poetics of Endangered Species: Ukraine. Editions of both books were donated to the British Library.

Ljutjuk's next project was The Ark of Unique Cultures, with The Ark of Unique Cultures: The Hutsuls, created in 2014. It focuses on the Hutsuls, an ethnic group from western Ukraine and Romania. This book includes poems by Ukrainian poet Mariya Korpanyuk, plants collected from the Carpathian Mountains, and postcards designed by Ljutjuk with messages from Hutsul people.

== Churches founded by Ljutjuk ==
- Three Handed Mother of God Church, which is affiliated with the Ukrainian Cultural Center
- Virgin Mary Chapel, where people can pray for Estonia's nature
