= Andriy Mykhaylyk =

Andriy Mykhaylyk (Ukrainian: Михайлик Андрій Костянтинович, born 6 April 1957, Kyiv, Ukrainian SSR) is a film director, journalist, author, cameraman, and publicist.

== Education and career ==
Mykhalyk received a bachelor's degree in engineering from the Kiev Polytechnic Institute and then gained employment in a number of occupations such as, metal working, design engineering, sports tourism, building and civil service.

In 1987, Mykhaylyk entered a career in journalism. By 1991, he had been published. Mykaylyk also gained employment as a television reporter, presenter on television and film, cameraman and director. At the Eco-Ukraine Association, Mykhaylyk became editor-in-chief of the television program, Zelena Studia. At the Chernobyl Information Agency, he became the author and presenter of the television program, Nadzvychaina sytuatsia. He also took the role of editor-in-chief of the television broadcasts of Verkhovna Rada.

In February 2001, Mykhaylyk travelled to India to cover the Gujarat earthquake. He was embedded with a Ukrainian mobile hospital where he worked as a reporter, cameramen, photographer and rescuer.

In November and December 2004, Mykhaylyk led a team filming events in the Ukrainian parliament. His work was broadcast as a daily program called No Comments which was part of the Parliamentary record on R.A.D.A., the Ukrainian parliament television channel.

Mykhaylyk also reported many items relating to consequences of the Chernobyl catastrophe. One item, for example, was the history and use of the Chernobyl shelter which he documented in the film The Den for a Nuclear Beast.

== Awards ==
- 2001: Ukraine Ministry of Emergencies and Affairs of Population Protection award, second class, for courage in an emergency (the Chernobyl disaster).
- 2002: Parliamentary journalism competition (laureate).
- 2005: Ukraine Verkhovna Rada diploma.
- 2007: Fifth International Festival of Screen Arts (Kinotur), nomination for the rescue services documentary, Knights of Mountains

== Television work ==
- 1996: Opening of the Community Ecology Centre.
- 1998: Region for NART television company.
- 2000 to 2002: Safety ABC for the Chornobyl Information Agency.
- 2006 to 2007: Objective for RADA.
- 2007 to 2008: Diplomacy World for RADA.
- 2008 to 2009: That’s the way it is.

== Filmography ==
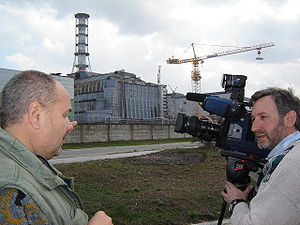
Andriy Mykhaylyk and Alexander Yudkovich in the Chernobyl disaster zone

- 1997: Dum spiro spero - the Carpathian mountains – the green lungs of Europe
- 1998: Paradise on the Northern coast - the Black Sea Biosphere Reserve
- 1998: Blue Eyes of the Volyn Region
- 1998: Granite
- 1999: Kaniv Natural Reserve
- 2000: The Solar System
- 2001: Letters from India

Video on YouTube,

- 2001: The Den for a Nuclear Beast
- 2001: Dnipro - lessons from Chernobyl
- 2002: Origins of Independence - Breath of Fire from Kholodnyi Yar
- 2002: Ukrainian Taxpayers Association
- 2002: Prevent to avoid rescue
- 2002: Disaster won’t catch them out
- 2002: Examined - no mines
- 2002: Training has been successful
- 1996 to 2003: Where the river Uzh begins
- 1997 to 2003: Blue Whirlpools of the Carpathian Mountains Video on YouTube
- 2003: The Roads of Anatolii Rakhanskyi
- 2004: Gold of the Silver Land (Zakarpattia's forestry issues)
- 2004: Saki - a city of Sun
- 2004: Episodes of the Parliamentary Chronicle Video on YouTube
- 2005: From maidan to maidan
- 2005: Nineteen years of the Chernobyl disaster
- 2006: Week end, Zakarpattia style
- 2006: Chernobyl Spring Video on YouTube
- 2006: Where the whisper of the mountains sounds as an echo in the soul
- 2006: The Syvash Rubicon
- 2006: The Bukovina Dimension
- 2007: Malaysia - on the Coast of the Ocean of the Future
- 2007: Primeval Forests in the Center of Europe Video on YouTube
- 2007: Slavutych - my native town
- 2007: Knights of Mountains
- 2008: Carpathian, First National
- 2008: That’s the way it is (part one, about the causes and consequences of flooding in the Carpathian region)
- 2008: Chalet for Horthy
- 2009: Sheep, my sheep
- 2011: Another Chernobyl Video on YouTube
- 2011: Stuzhystsa's premiere Video on YouTube
- 2012: Ukraine 20/21 (documentary) Video on YouTube
- 2007 to 2008: Monologues: Maecenas (series)
- 2007 to 2008: Molfar, the Carpathian sorcerer Video on YouTube
- 2007 to 2008: Painter
- 2007 to 2008: Rescue Video on YouTube
- 2009: Guardian of the Future
- 2010: Senior Video on YouTube

== Publications ==
- The School of teaching and learning, an interview with Vasyl Kremen.
- Mountain ecological balance, an important factor in the prevention of emergency situations.
- A Balkan journey.
- That one, who is seated in Sarkofag, problems of the Ukryttia second unit. Nadzvychaina Sytuatsia magazine, 2002 issue 12.
- Exclusion Zone, Moskovsky Komsomolets in Ukraine, weekly periodical, 2010 issue 17.
- Fears of insurance medicine, Moskovsky Komsomolets in Ukraine, 2010 issue 25.
- Sheep, my sheep Moskovsky Komsomolets in Ukraine, 2010 issue 33.
- The Other majority Moskovsky Komsomolets in Ukraine, 2010 issue 35.

== See also ==
- Kintour Film Festival, Nadzvychaina sytuatsia magazine November 2007, 11(121).
- Anatolii Matvyienko: Confidence, that's what we are in great need of.
- Presentation of three projects of the National Deputies Association of Ukraine IUPDP organisation.
