= Leonid Kozachenko =

Ukrainian politician

- Леонід Козаченко
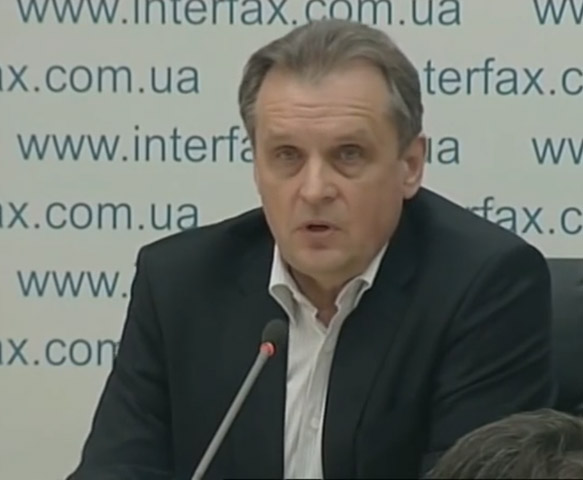
- Kozachenko in 2014

People's Deputy of Ukraine

8th convocation
- In office November 27, 2014 – August 29, 2019
- Constituency: Petro Poroshenko Bloc

Personal details
- Born: 14 May 1955 Vepryk, Ukrainian SSR, Soviet Union

Leonid Kozachenko (Ukrainian: Козаченко Леонід Петрович, born 14 May 1955) is a Ukrainian politician, People's Deputy of Ukraine of the 8th convocation, President of the Ukrainian Agrarian Confederation. Former Vice Prime Minister of Agrarian Policy (June 9, 2001 - November 26, 2002), Academician of the Ukrainian Academy of Technology (since 1997).

== Early life ==
Kozachenko was born on 10 January 1955 in the village of Vepryk, which was then part of the Ukrainian SSR in the Soviet Union. In 1977, he graduated from the Ukrainian Agricultural Academy with a major in mechanical engineering. He was then the head of the central workshop for the collective farm "Kozhanskyi" located in the Fastiv Raion. After a year, he became chief engineer of the state farm "Bolshevik" (also in Fastiv) and was later chairman of the board for the collective farm for the village of Pylypivka.

In 1986, he was appointed to be a party worker, which he did until 1988. He then attended the All-Union Academy of Foreign Trade, which he graduated from in 1991 with a specialization in foreign trade.

He held management positions at agricultural enterprises; in 1991, he served as head of the Department of Agricultural Marketing and Licensing at the Ministry of Agriculture of Ukraine. During the Soviet era, he worked in party affairs and served as chairman of the board, chief engineer, and head of the central workshop at collective and state farms in the Fastiv District of the Kyiv Region.

He served as Head of the Department of Agricultural Marketing and Licenses for the Ministry of Agrarian Policy and Food of Ukraine. He then returned to private work, heading the JSC "Ukragrobusiness" and became a member of the Council of Entrepreneurs and Employers.

== Political career ==
On 9 June 2001, he was appointed Vice Prime Minister of Agrarian Policy. He did this until 2002, when he became President of the Ukrainian Agrarian Confederation.

Until July 2003, he was also an adviser to the Prime Minister. In 2005, he became an advisor to President Viktor Yushchenko, and then to Mayor of Kyiv Leonid Chernovetskyi.

From May 8, 2014, he served as a special advisor to Ukrainian Prime Minister Arseniy Yatsenyuk. On March 12, 2016, Leonid Kozachenko resigned from his position as an unofficial advisor.

== Personal life ==
Wife: Lyudmila Vasylivna, accountant and economist. Daughters: Alla (1980), Hanna (1986).
