= Kevin Pedrotti =

Australian rules footballer

Personal information
- Full name: Kevin James Pedrotti
- Born: 5 April 1948
- Died: 11 April 2011 (aged 63)
- Original team: West Newport
- Height: 183 cm (6 ft 0 in)
- Weight: 76 kg (168 lb)

Playing career^{1}
Years	Club	Games (Goals)
1965–68	South Melbourne	17 (0)
- ^{1} Playing statistics correct to the end of 1968.

Kevin James Pedrotti (5 April 1948 – 11 April 2011) was an Australian rules footballer who played with South Melbourne in the Victorian Football League (VFL).
