= Mathys Medical =

Swiss medical technology company

Mathys Ltd Bettlach
- Company type: Subsidiary
- Industry: Medical Technology
- Founded: 1946; 80 years ago
- Headquarters: Bettlach, canton of Solothurn, Switzerland
- Number of locations: 10
- Key people: Dr Benjamin Reinmann (CEO)
- Products: Joint replacement, biomaterial, sports medicine
- Revenue: 116 million Swiss Francs (2016)
- Number of employees: 562 (12/2016)
- Parent: Enovis
- Website: www.mathysmedical.com

Mathys Ltd Bettlach (formerly Mathys Medical), is a Swiss family business with headquarters in Bettlach, Switzerland. The company develops, produces and distributes implants for artificial joint replacement in the areas of hip, knee and shoulder as well as biomaterials for surgical treatment of bone defects (bone grafting) With an innovative implant for ACL healing, the family company also gained ground in the area of sport orthopaedics at the beginning of 2013.

Mathys employs over 560 workers, including in its ten subsidiaries Australia, Austria, Belgium, France, Germany, Italy, Japan, the Netherlands, New Zealand, Switzerland. With more than 30 local marketing partners, Mathys is represented all over the world.

Until 2021, the company was in possession of the families Mathys and Marzo. In June 2021, the company was acquired by ENOVIS, by the time of the acquisition still branded as DJOglobal, a subsidiary of Colfax Corp.’s.

== History ==
Robert Mathys Senior founded his company in 1946, specializing in the development and production of machines, equipment and components of special stainless and acid-resistant steels.

In 1958, his way crosses the one of Prof. Dr. Maurice E. Mueller. Mathys begins to develop and produce implants and instruments for bone surgery and orthopaedics. Starting 1960, the first products for bone fracture treatment were merchandised after the guidelines of the Arbeitsgemeinschaft für Osteosynthesefragen (English: Association for the Study of Internal Fixation, AO/ASIF) under the name Synthes.

In 1963, the development of the first hip replacement begins; between 1967 and 1988, implants from Mathys are sold under the name Protek. In the 70s, the second generation is starting to be active in research and development and enters the family business.

In 1980, the independent non-profit organisation Dr. h.c. Robert Mathys Foundation is founded as a research institute and service laboratory.

In 1988, Sulzer Orthopaedics is taking over Protek; therefore Mathys develops and produces for Sulzer until 1996.

In the years 1996 and 1997, Mathys enters the market and sells his products for the first time under its own name Mathys Orthopaedics.

The family company acquires the German Keramed in 2002 and becomes the only orthopaedic producer worldwide developing and manufacturing its own ceramic. Until today, the Mathys ceramics production site is located in the German Moersdorf/Thueringen.

In 2003, Mathys consigns its osteosynthesis division to at that time Synthes-Stratec and focuses from now on exclusively on orthopaedics. On November 1, 2003, today’s Mathys Ltd Bettlach is founded, build-up and expansion of its subsidiaries abroad starts.

With Livio Marzo as member of the board of directors, the third generation is entering the family business in 2008. In this year, a strategic alliance with the Italian Lima Lto-Pty is agreed upon.

In 2009, Mathys expands to Asia and opens offices in Shanghai, Hong Kong as well as Japan. In spite of the worldwide economic crisis, 47 new employees are hired in the first semester of 2009.

In 2012, enters the sports orthopaedics market

On January 31, 2013, a street is named after the company's founder Robert Mathys Senior: The Headquarters of the orthopaedic producer is now located at the Robert Mathys Strasse in Bettlach.

In 2014, Roger Mathys is elected to the Board of Directors as the second member of the 3rd generation.

In 2016, the subsidiary Italy is founded.

In 2021, the company was acquired by ENOVIS, by the time of the acquisition still branded as DJOglobal, a subsidiary of Colfax Corp.’s.

== Products ==
Mathys Ltd Bettlach is concentrating exclusively on the development, production and distribution of products for artificial joint replacement. The main production site is Bettlach, Switzerland. Other production is in (Mörsdorf, Thuringia, Germany. The company’s performance includes as of now implants for hip, knee, and shoulder, as well as biomaterial and products for sports medicine: In 2009, Mathys developed under the lead of a research group of the two Bernese hospitals Sonnenhof AG Bern and Inselspital a new method to treatment a newly ruptured anterior cruciate ligament. The implant named Ligamys allows in the ideal case a biological self healing and the preservation of an anterior cruciate ligament.
