= Valery Bevzenko =

Ukrainian politician

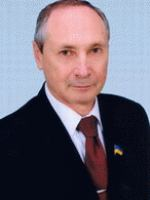
Бевзенко Валерій Федорович

Valery Fedorovich Bevzenko is a former Ukrainian politician and a member of parliament. In August 2012 left the Party of Regions.

== Biography ==
Valery Bevzenko was born on May 20, 1946 in Ivano-Frankivsk, Ukraine. He is married. His wife Svetlana (b. 1948) is a housewife, son Igor (b. 1968) is a private entrepreneur.

=== Education ===
In 1969 Valery Bevzenko graduated from Lviv Polytechnic Institute, majoring in Technology of inorganic compounds and chemical fertilizers, with the qualification of Engineer.

1992 - Donetsk Polytechnic Institute, major Economics and Management in Metallurgy, qualification of Engineer-Economist.

2000 - Ph.D. thesis "Mixed marketing strategies of a joint-stock company - evidence from extractive industries."

== Career ==
- 1961-1964 - electrician at Rozdol Mining and Chemical Combine in Lviv region.
- 1969-1979 - shift leader of a sulfur melting process, deputy manager of the shop, shop supervisor, and chief engineer of the sulfur melting department at Rozdol Mining and Chemical Combine.
- 1979-1990 - Deputy Head, then Head of Production Department of the state association "Ukrvognetriv," Donetsk.
- 1990-2000 - General Director of closed JSC Keramet (Donetsk), Chairman of the Supervisory Board of Velikonovoselkovka Refractory Works.
- 2000-2006 - President of Keramet, Chairman of the Supervisory Board of JSC Keramet.
- 2006-2012 - Deputy of the 5th and 6th Verkhovna Rada.
- Retired since 2012.

=== Verkhovna Rada ===
May 2006-November 2007 - Deputy of the 5th Verkhovna Rada from the Party of Regions, No. 60 in the list. Chairman of the Subcommittee on Land Relations Committee on Agrarian Policy and Land Relations (since July 2006). Since May 2006 has been a member of the Party of Regions fraction. Member of the Group of Interparliamentary Relations with the French Republic, Member of the Group of Interparliamentary Relations with the Republic of Poland. In August 2012, left the Party of Regions.

In the 2014 parliamentary election, Bevzenko tried to win a constituency seat in Volnovakha as a non-partisan candidate but failed, having finished fourth in the constituency with 5.34% of the votes. Since that time is not politically active

== See also ==
- 2007 Ukrainian parliamentary election
- List of Ukrainian Parliament Members 2007
- Verkhovna Rada
