= Gurzhos Vadym =

Ukrainian activist, entrepreneur and politician (born 1958)

Vadym Gurzhos (Ukrainian: Вадим Миколайович Гуржос. Born 9 September 1958, Kryvyi Rih, Dnipropetrovsk region) Ukrainian social and political activist, entrepreneur.

== Biography ==
Born 9 September 1958 (Kryvyi Rih. Mother Anna D. lives in Kryvyi Rih. Father Mykola, was the chief-engineer of the largest mine in Krivbass (Kryvyi Rih) had State awards and patented inventions. Family: wife - Galina (1974); sons: Mykola (1990), Matviy (2008), Mykhaylo (2011); daughter: Mar"yana (2004).

In 1980 he graduated from the Kryvyi Rih Mining Institute with "Applied Geodesy" degree at mine-shaft construction department.

In 1990 he received a second degree from Kiev Institute of National Economics.

== Professional career ==
He began his career at the age of 21.

- 1979 – Technician in topography and land-surveyor works.
- 1980-1981 - Engineer Kryvyi Rih Research Institute.
- 1981-1983 - Conscription at Interior Troops of the Ministry of Internal Affairs of the Ukrainian SSR.
- 1983-1990 - Kryvyi Rih Metallurgical Plant of steel production "Krivorozhstal" - senior positions. Mr. Gurzhos was taking care of enterprise, foreign economic activity.

== Entrepreneurship ==
- 1990 - 1995, Director and Managing Director of the company Sytco AG Switzerland in Ukraine. Ukrainian metallurgical sector industry.
- In 1996 he became co-owner of "Ternopolvtormet"(Ternopil) and continued to cooperate actively with the steelworks.
- 1996-2001 Founder and head of the Ukrainian Association of scrap metal.
- 1997-2001 Co-owner and Chairman of the Supervisory Board of "Galakton."
- 2004-2005 Director of "Himimport.

== Political career ==
From 1987 to 2003 - Deputy/Head of the Council of Entrepreneurs under the Cabinet of Ministers of Ukraine; 2000-2004 - Advisor to the Minister of Economy of Ukraine, Advisor to the Minister of Industrial Policy of Ukraine, Deputy Head of the Board of Appeal of the State Committee of Ukraine for Regulatory Policy and Entrepreneurship. Since 2002 - Member of the Board of the Ukrainian Union of Industrialists and Entrepreneurs.

In 2001, as head of the Party of Private Property, participated in the elections to the Parliament of Ukraine part of the political party" Ozimoe Generation." Head of "Private Property" Party (2002–2009. 2003-2004 - Head of the public association "Business Initiative."

2005-2006. Head of the State Road Administration of Ukraine(UkrAvtoDor). From beginning it has been proposed to develop a program of public roads that would emphasize directions of international transport. Gurzhos has restored and built a new road between Kharkiv and Novomoskovsk. Launched a major renovation and construction in areas of international transit corridors. To finance the construction successfully raised funds under the state guarantees from international institutions and co-financing from the state budget. Initiated reform in management system of public roads, developed legislation for building on a concession basis.

2006 - 2010 Rada Delegate of the Kyiv Regional

2006 - 2008 Deputy Head of Kyiv Regional State Administration. Was one of the designers and constructors of a ring road around Kiev.

In January 2008 - Deputy Minister of Transport and Communications of Ukraine on the preparation of transport infrastructure for the European Football Championship (UEFA 2012).

In August 2008, Vadym Gurzhos was re-appointed the Head of the State Road Administration of Ukraine. During the 2008 financial crisis, he dealt with the problem of attracting additional funds to avoid default of Ukraine under obligations Ukravtodor, continued further development of the road infrastructure.

Due to changes in the leadership of Ukraine in March 2010, he resigned.

In the 2014 Ukrainian parliamentary election Vadym placed 8th on the (nationwide) party list of Strong Ukraine. In the election this party failed to clear the 5% election threshold (it got 3.11% of the votes) and thus Vadym did not make it to parliament (the party did win one constituency seat and thus one parliamentary seat).

Gurzhos Vadym multiple times nominated and won "Man of the Year".

(2001). Was awarded the Order of Merit (Ukraine) III degree.

In 2000 Vadym Gurzhos was recognized by the Cabinet of Ministers of Ukraine with a Certificate of Honor - Ukr.
