= All About Accounting =

Ukrainian magazine

- head editor: Petro Krychun
- Categories: Accountancy
- Frequency: 120 numbers yearly
- Circulation: 93,100
- First issue: May 1, 1994
- Country: Ukraine
- Based in: Kyiv
- Language: Ukrainian; Russian
- Website: vobu.ua
- ISSN: 1682-508X

Front Page of first issue

All About Accounting (Ukrainian: Все про бухгалтерський облік, romanized: Vse pro bukhhalterskyi oblik) is a semiweekly Ukrainian and Russian-language newspaper based in Kyiv (Ukraine) with a run of 93,100. Published since 1994.

== Timeline ==
1993 – newspaper was established.
1994 – The first newspaper issue publication, run of 17000 copies.
1995 – Newspaper format changes from 16 to 32 pages.
1996 – The 100th issue of the newspaper is revealed to the world, run of 50000 copies.
1997 – The newspaper becomes a semiweekly periodical. In addition, subscribers are now receiving two subject special editions on monthly basis.
1998 – New service for subscribers comes to life: taxation and accounting report forms, together with a quarterly publications catalogue. The newspaper becomes the first Ukrainian accounting periodical to be published in both Russian and Ukrainian languages.
1999 – The 400th issue of the newspaper, with a run reaching 74500 copies, is published. The periodical becomes a laureate of Vyshcha Proba (eng. The Highest Probe) countrywide contest.
2000 – New service comes to life: the subscribers are able to contact the editorial board through round-the-clock telephone help-line. A My Tax Officer Is The Best contest is organized in collaboration with the Tax Administration of Ukraine.
2001 – The newspaper is awarded with the Honorary Diploma and Commemorative Decoration of the Cabinet of Ministers of Ukraine. The management of the editorial board is awarded with President’s of Ukraine Commendation. The editorial board provides Ukrainian institutes, universities, technical schools and colleges, having an accounting major and running accounting courses, with specialized subject information.
2002 – The 700th issue of the newspaper, with a run of 90600 copies, is published. The Best Accountant of Ukraine contest is held, with 540 accountants from all over Ukraine becoming winners.
The management of the editorial board is awarded with President’s of Ukraine Commendation.
2003 – First free consultation line dedicated to accounting and tax assessment matters is created. The subscribers now are provided with exclusive additions: Hotels of Ukraine, Foreign-Economic Activity Reference Book, and Samples of Basic Documents Completion. The management of the editorial board is awarded with the Honorary Diploma of the Cabinet of Ministers of Ukraine.
2004 – The newspaper celebrates its 10th anniversary. The periodical website is created - www.vobu.com.ua. Subject-oriented internet forums of the newspaper (.forum.vobu.com.ua) are operating. The periodical becomes one of principal originators for the official Accountant’s Day, July 16, celebration.
My Director Is The Best contest is held. 255 best directors of companies from all over Ukraine are selected. Verkhovna Rada, the Ukrainian parliament, awards the newspaper with the Honorary Diploma.
2005 – The newspaper becomes an indisputable leader on professional periodicals market. The run reaches 93100 copies. A Digital Accountants Calendar application is developed.
2006 – Accountants’ Information System (AIS-service) is initiated. The service provides free support for accountants, managers, lawyers, and entrepreneurs through email, as well as allows ordering normative documents, legislation news, and report forms to an email address. A Turn-key Subscription promotion is organized, with 3 contestants winning apartments in Kyiv.
2007 – The largest number of forum participants is registered – 252 persons were simultaneously visiting the newspaper’s forum. A Mysteries of Egypt promotion is held, with 230 accountants winning vouchers for a journey to Egypt.
2008 – A 15 Years Together or All About Success in Accounting promotion is held. 15 accountants are granted cars. Content management concept if reviewed, as well as the newspaper’s design. A help-line with representatives of the State Treasury of Ukraine, the Ministry of Education and Science, the Ministry of Healthcare, and the Ministry of Culture and Sport starts operating.
For the first time the all-Ukrainian contest for the best author of a budget accounting publication is held among employees of the State Treasury of Ukraine.
The Best Student’s Article contest is held among students of Ukrainian institutes and colleges.
With the assistance of the State Treasury of Ukraine the newspaper starts a Treasurer column, which contains up-to-date comments and explanations dedicated to accounting matters in state-financed organizations.
2009 – The subscribers get free CDs containing report forms. A Generous Gifts promotion is held, with 1625 Ukrainian accountants winning money rewards. A CD containing normative documents for state institutions accountants is released.
The Yaskrave Radio ((in English) Bright Radio) starts broadcasting at www.vobu.com.ua website.
Special editions of the newspaper now have color cover.
New format is introduced to The Super-Table, popular reference source among accountants.
2010 – As a result of collaboration of the State Tax Administration of Ukraine and the editorial board, 125 Questions About Taxation, a special edition of the newspaper, is published. The edition contains answers given by tax officers from all over Ukraine.
On the occasion of 15th anniversary of the State Treasury of Ukraine, a second contest for the best author of a budget accounting publication is held.
The newspaper now has specialized columns and larger number of pages.
The Best Mentor contest, organized at the official website of the All about accounting newspaper, is held, with 200000 voters taking part in it; every institute, university, technical school and college in Ukraine selects and awards its favorite faculty staff member with the Best Mentor of Ukraine Honorary Diploma.
New creative projects, Inspection: Practice of Defense and Bankruptcy, are launched.
On October 23, 2010, the editorial board of the All about accounting newspaper created the largest newspaper in the world. Its dimensions amounting to 126 (320 cm) inches at height and 89 (226 cm) inches in width, and being opened – 126 (320 cm) inches at height and 178 (452 cm) inches in width. The newspaper is by ten times larger than a regular size of All about Accounting issue. The new record was accepted as a world record by the Ukrainian Book of Records.

== Editorial staff ==
- O. G. Stepoviy – Chief editor
- P. M. Krychun – Head editor
- V. S. Kaplun – Director

== Awards ==
- Laureate of Vyshcha Proba countrywide contest – 1999;
- Honorary Diploma of the Cabinet of Ministers of Ukraine – 2001;
- Diploma of the Verkhovna Rada of Ukraine – 2004;
- Diploma of Ministry of Fuel and Energy of Ukraine – 2004;
- Diploma of Ukrainian Book of Records – 2010.

== See also ==
- List of newspapers in Ukraine
