= Vasyl Hrytsak (police general) =

Ukrainian politician (born 1961)

Vasyl Grytsak Василь Грицак
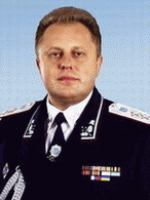

Chairman of the International public organization "Union of Generals of Internal Affairs of Ukraine"
- In office 2008 – to present

Vice-chairman of the State Migration Service of Ukraine
- In office 2013–2014

People's deputy of Ukraine of VI convocation
- In office November 2007 – December 2012

People's deputy of Ukraine of V convocation
- In office May 2006 – November 2007

Head of the Department of resource support of the Ministry of Internal Affairs of Ukraine
- In office 2003–2005

Head of the Main Directorate of the Ministry of the Ministry of Internal Affairs of Ukraine
- In office 2001–2003

Vice-Rector of the National Academy of Internal Affairs
- In office 1995–2001

Personal details
- Born: Vasyl Nikolaevich Grytsak; February 17, 1961 (age 65) Horynhrad Druhyi, Ukrainian SSR, Soviet Union
- Party: nonpartisan
- Spouse: Natalya Grytsak
- Children: Marina, Igor, Alexander

Military service
- Allegiance: Soviet Union; Ukraine
- Branch/service: Soviet Army police
- Years of service: 1979 – 1981; 1987-2005
- Rank: Lieutenant General of police

Vasyl Mykolaiovych Hrytsak (Ukrainian: Василь Миколайович Грицак; born 17 February 1961, Horynhrad Druhyi, Rivne Oblast) is a Ukrainian police Lieutenant General and People's Deputy of Ukraine of V and VI convocations of the pro-Russian Party of Regions, who served as Deputy Chairman of the State Migration Service of Ukraine during Viktor Yanukovych administration.

== Biography ==
From 1979 to 1981 he served in the Soviet Army, Alma-Ata, in / h 78460, military transport regiment of aviation and communication of the Central Asia Military District.

Higher education. In 1986 he graduated from the Ukrainian National University of Water and Environmental Engineering (Rivne), in 1999 — National University Odesa Law Academy. Building engineer, Lawyer-jurist.

From 1986 till 1995 – had been occupying engineering and senior positions in the enterprises of Kharkiv city as well as the position of the head of the project department of the Ministry of Internal Affairs (Ukraine) in Kharkiv oblast, Assistant Chief of the Ministry of Internal Affairs of Ukraine in Kharkiv region on a part-time basis. From 1995 till 2001 — the assistant to the rector of the University of Internal Affairs - Head of the Capital Construction department, Vice-Rector for Economics and material and technical support of National University of Internal Affairs of Ukraine (Kharkiv). In 1999 he has defended his doctoral thesis at the special council of the National University Odesa Law Academy.

From 2001 till 2005 - Head of the Central Administration of material and technical and military support of the Ministry of Internal Affairs of Ukraine, Head of the department of resource support of the Ministry of Internal Affairs of Ukraine. From 2006 till 2012 – People's Deputy of Ukraine for Party of Regions the V (2006-2007) and VI (2007-2012) convocations of the Verkhovna Rada of Ukraine. The Committee on Legislative Support of the Law Enforcement of the Supreme Council of Ukraine. He developed about 80 draft laws of Ukraine, 35 of which were signed by the President of Ukraine.

From 2011, Vasyl Hrytsak had been co-author of the idea of a Ukrainian police even before the current Minister of Internal Affairs of Ukraine Arsen Avakov expressed interest in the creation of a new police patrol instead of the police. Authors of the bill wanted to provide a high control over police activities. «Cancel of some titles based on the fact that they are not needed. The European experience tells us about it again. A salary increase will lead to the gradual elimination of the corruption, which, unfortunately, cannot be eradicated in one day», - said V. Hrytsak. From 2013 till 2014 – Deputy Chairman of the State Migration Service of Ukraine.

== Activities in the Verkhovna Rada ==
In 2006, the People's Deputy of Ukraine Hrytsak introduced the Draft Law of Ukraine "On the national demographic register" No. 2170 from 14.09.2006. Since that moment, they have begun to solve legislatively the issues of a new passport system of Ukraine and identification documents, according to the new ICAO standards.

Since 2011, Vasyl Hrytsak had been co-author of the idea of the National Police of Ukraine in the creation of a new police patrol instead of the militia. Two fundamental draft laws "On Police" and "On State Service of the rule of law" were developed by Hrytsak.

18.05.2012, V.Hrytsak introduced a draft law "On the Unified State demographic Register and documents that confirm citizenship of Ukraine, according to the personality and its special status." The law was adopted in 2012 (No. 5492-VI). Thus, Ukraine has finally brought its legislation to the international standards in the field of identification documents. According to the estimates of the world's experts, there is no more qualitative document in this field in Europe.

Also, Hrytsak developed a number of laws "On the organization of the legal framework to combat an organized crime and corruption". He took an active part in the discussions and voted for the significant laws in the field of finance, economics, law, foreign and domestic policy, and others. According to the experts, he was one of the most disciplined and effective deputies in the V and VI convocations of the Verkhovna Rada of Ukraine.

== Scientific activity ==
Candidate of Legal Sciences, docent, Laureate of the State Prize of Ukraine in the Science and Technology. Laureate of the International Congress ID World "For the significant contribution to the development of e-passports worldwide. Ukrainian foreign passport" November 18, 2008 (Milan, Italy). The decision of the tender committee of the OSCE, the European Commission and Interpol.

== Honors ==
- Honors of the President of Ukraine - "Defender of the Fatherland".
- Nominal weapon of Ministry of Internal Affairs (Ukraine)(2003)
- Honored Economist of Ukraine (2004)
- Nominal weapon of Ministry of Defence of Ukraine (2004)
- Diploma of the Verkhovna Rada of Ukraine (2011)
- Awards of Ministry of Internal Affairs (Ukraine) ("Cross of Glory", "Law and honor", "Honored Worker of MIA of Ukraine", "Knight of the Law", "For the safety of the people", "For the development of science, technology and education I-III degrees").
- Marked by the departmental awards: Ministry of Internal Affairs of the Russian Federation, Belarus, Poland, Hungary, Moldova, Kazakhstan, Armenia and other countries.

== Family ==
Wife - Natalya Hrytsak., children:

- Marina;
- Igor;
- Alexander.

Brother: Vitaly Mykolaiovych Hrytsak (1964), he served in Afghanistan (1983-1985), awarded by the medal "For Service in the Battle", ex-chief of the Internal Affairs of Khmelnytskyi Oblast (2007-2008), ex-head of the Department of Protection at the Ministry of Internal Affairs of Ukraine (2008-2010), the deputy of Rivne Regional Council (2010-2015.), Major General of police.

== Hobbies ==
In his youth – boxing, wrestling, now - football, the history of military battles and the history of the Ancient World.
