= Leonid Serhienko =

Ukrainian politician

Leonid Serhienko Леонід Григорович Сергієнко
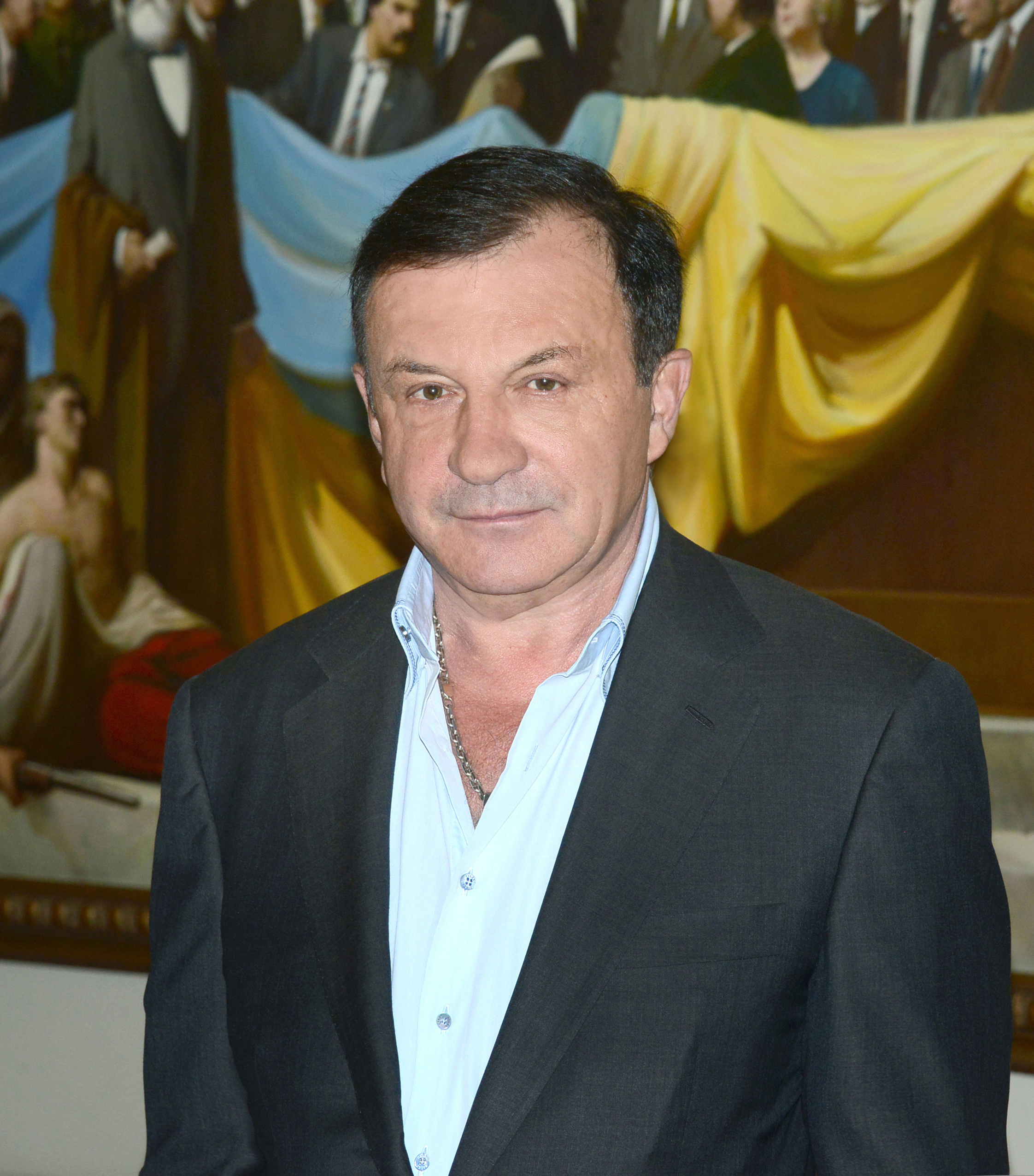

Personal details
- Born: 27 April 1955 (age 71) Mykolaivka, Pokrovske Raion, Dnipropetrovsk Oblast, Ukrainian SSR
- Education: Oles Honchar Dnipropetrovsk National University

Leonid Hrygorovuch Serhienko (Ukrainian: Леонід Григорович Сергієнко) was born on April 27, 1955, Mykolaivka, Pokrovske Raion, Dnipropetrovsk Oblast, USSR) is a Ukrainian politician and a People’s Deputy of Ukraine of the IVth, VIIth convocations.

== Education ==
In 1981, Serhienko graduated from Oles Honchar Dnipropetrovsk National University — specialty: radio physicist, an electronic engineer.

== Career ==
- 1972 – 1973 — a turner KB «Progress», Zaporizhia.
- 1973 – 1975 — service in the Soviet Army.
- 1981 – 1982 — radio equipment engineer of Dnipropetrovsk Dnipropetrovsk Carbuilding Plant by Lenin.
- 1982 – 1983 — a deputy shop superintendent of Dnipropetrovsk radioequipment plant.
- 1983 – 1988 — the senior engineer of energy-maintenance workshop section of Dnipropetrovsk «Polimer» plant. Electrical engineer of monitoring and metering instruments and automatics of wholesale and retail vegetable plant of Babushkinskyi District of Dnipropetrovsk.
- 1988 – 1993 — electrical fitter of Communal Accommodation department of Dnipropetrovsk Heavy Presses Plant. Driver IC «Ohonek», Dnipropetrovsk.
- 1993 – 1994 — a director of ME «Adsi».
- 1994 – 1995 — a director of CJSC «Stroidneproservis».
- 1995 – 2002 — a director of Ukraine-German CJSC «Dnipromain».
- 1998 – 2002 — a deputy of Dnipropetrovsk City Council
- Since 2002 — a member of supervisory committee National Nuclear Energy Generating Company «Energoatom».
- May 14, 2002 – May 25, 2006 — People’s deputy of Ukraine of the IVth convocation (in accordance with election division № 27 in Dnipropetrovsk Oblast, self-nomination). At the moment of election he was a member of Party of industrialists and Entrepreneurs of Ukraine. The Member of the Verkhovna Rada Committee on Fuel and Energy Complex, Nuclear Policy and Nuclear Security Affairs.
- At the Parliament elections of 2006 he stood in elections according to the list of Socialist Party of Ukraine, № 40.
- August 23, 2006 – February 6, 2008 — Deputy Minister of Transportation and Communication of Ukraine.
- February 6 – September 10, 2008 — Deputy Minister of Transportation and Communication of Ukraine — Director of State Department of Automobile Transport.
- September 10, 2008 — July 1, 2009 — Deputy Minister of Transportation and Communication of Ukraine — Director of State Administration of Automobile Transport.
- Since December 12, 2012 — People’s deputy of Ukraine of the VIIth convocation. At the moment of elections he was non-party man and the President of LLC “Vinil”. A Deputy Chairman of the Verkhovna Rada’s Committee on the questions of tax and customs policy.
- He is a full and single owner of LLC “Vinil”, LLC “Niktrans”, and LLC “SLG”.

== Family ==
He is married, and has two children.

== Awards ==
He is a holder of the Order of Merit of the third class (1999) and of the second class (2004). He was awarded with of the Certificate of Merit of the Verkhovna Rada of Ukraine (2005).
