= Valerii Borysov =

Ukrainian politician

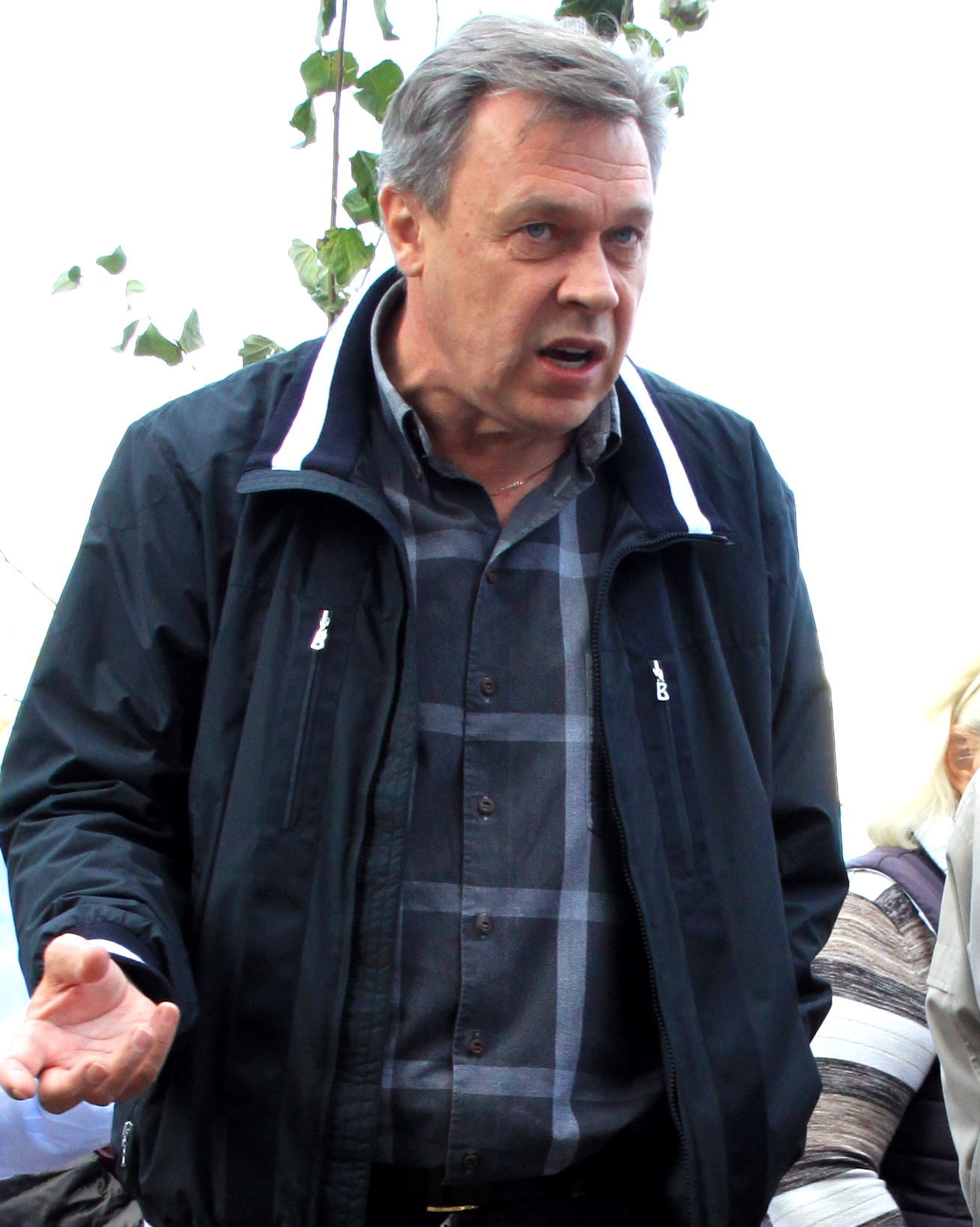
Валерій Борисов

Valerii Borysov (Ukrainian: Валерій Дмитрович Борисов; born May 31, 1957, in Kiliya, Odesa Oblast), is a member of Party of Regions, former member of Verkhovna Rada of Ukraine.

== Education ==
- In 1982 he graduated from Kyiv Technological Institute of food industry, Machinery and Equipment Faculty
- 1987 - PG course at the Council of productive forces of Ukrainian SSR, Academy of Sciences of Ukraine

== Family ==
His wife Olena (born 1957) is the director of the cultural and recreational center "Sabina". They have one son, Dmytro (born 1981), who is the Director of "MTІ Ukraine", Deputy of Pechersky district council in Kyiv.

== Career ==
- August 1982 - December 1984 - engineer at the research sector of the Kyiv Institute of National Economy
- December 1984 - February 1987 - post-graduate studies (see above)
- April - July 1987 - engineer, Executive Committee of the Leningradsky District Council, Kyiv
- July 1987 - April 1992 - Head of department, chairman of the planning commission, vice-chairman, first vice-chairman of the Leningradsky District Council, Kyiv
- April 1992 - September 1993 - chairman of the economics committee, deputy Head of the Kyiv City State Administration
- September 1993 - February 1997 - Deputy Director of the "Registr Ltd"
- February 1997 - September 2000 - Director of private enterprise "Reniks"
- September 2000 - July 2001 - president of CJSC "Management board for the construction of tunnels and underground structures for special purposes"
- July 2001 - June 2002 - President of the Concern "Kyivpіdzemshlyahbud" (organization dealing with underground construction works in Kyiv)
- June 2002-May 2006 - Deputy Head, first Deputy Head of Kyiv City State Administration for Economy and Development

== Political ambitions ==
- People's Deputy of Ukraine in the 5th Verkhovna Rada from "Our Ukraine" bloc, No. 57 in the list. At the election time Valerii Borysov was the first Deputy Head of Kyiv City State Administration.
- People's Deputy of Ukraine of the 6th convocation of Verkhovna Rada in November 2007, was elected from the Bloc "Our Ukraine - People's Self-Defense" But he joined the faction of Party of Regions in parliament in 2011.

In the 2012 Ukrainian parliamentary election Borisov was candidate for Party of Regions in a single-member district in Kyiv. But he lost this election to Volodymyr Yavorivsky of All-Ukrainian Union "Fatherland" who gained 36.66% of the votes; Borisov gained 14.27% and fourth place.

Borisov did not participate in the 2014 Ukrainian parliamentary election.

== See also ==
- 2007 Ukrainian parliamentary election
- List of Ukrainian Parliament Members 2007
- Party of Regions
- Our Ukraine
