= 2007 Ukrainian political crisis =

2007 political crisis in Ukraine

A political crisis in Ukraine occurred between April to June 2007, due to political stand off between coalition and opposition factions of Ukraine's parliament, the Verkhovna Rada, that led to the unscheduled 2007 Ukrainian parliamentary election. It started on 2 April 2007 as a culmination of long lasting crisis and degradation of the parliamentary coalition when the president of Ukraine (Viktor Yushchenko) attempted to dissolve the parliament.

The president signed a presidential decree based on several articles of the Constitution of Ukraine ordering early parliamentary elections in Ukraine to be held on 27 May 2007, though they were later postponed to 24 June 2007. He also ordered the government of Ukraine to finance the appointed elections. The Parliament and the government of Yanukovych called this decree unconstitutional and prevented fund allocation for elections. The Constitutional Court was expected to conclude its public hearing on Wednesday, 25 April 2007, following the presentation of the Government and Parliament's submission. The Court would then retire to consider their ruling.

Viktor Yushchenko suspended the decree and postponed date of the election in order to have approved legislation on elections, the opposition, and the operation of Parliament.

== Dismissal of parliament and new elections ==
Leading up to the dissolution of parliament was the eight-month power struggle between the president and the parliament. Ongoing power struggles between the Coalition of National Unity and the opposition supported by the president Viktor Yushchenko frequently resulted in the opposition boycotting the parliament's plenary sessions.

Prior to the President's 2 April decree dismissing Ukraine's Parliament, 11 members of the opposition supported the governing Coalition of National Unity (formerly the Anti-Crisis Coalition). The President of Ukraine, Viktor Yushchenko, claimed that the right of individual members of a parliamentary faction to support the governing coalition was contrary to the provisions of Ukraine's Constitution.

Article 83 clause six, in what is commonly referred to as the Imperative mandate stated "According to election results and on the basis of a common ground achieved between various political positions, a coalition of parliamentary factions shall be formed in the Verkhovna Rada of Ukraine to include a majority of People's Deputies of Ukraine within the constitutional composition of the Verkhovna Rada of Ukraine".

The "Imperative mandate" provision of Ukraine's Constitution came under strong criticism by the Parliamentary Assembly of the Council of Europe as being undemocratic. The Parliamentary Assembly in its Explanatory memorandum dated 17 April 2007 had emphasized

Although Ukraine understandably has its own historic reasons to avoid the accumulation of power into the hands of one political force, it should nevertheless consider in the course of future constitutional amendments whether it would not be better for the country to switch to a full parliamentary system with proper checks and balances and guarantees of parliamentary opposition and competition.

— Parliamentary Assembly of the Council of Europe, 2007

The week before the president's initial decree, on 2 April, dismissing Ukraine's Parliament, thousands of supporters of the opposition gathered in Kyiv, calling on the President dissolve the parliament. A similar number of supporters of Verkhovna Rada Governing majority also gathered in Kyiv supporting Ukraine's parliament.

On 2 April, the President, Viktor Yushchenko, following a meeting with Prime Minister Viktor Yanukovych and Speaker of the Parliament Oleksandr Moroz, signed the first decree dismissing Ukraine's Parliament sparking another political and constitutional crisis in Ukraine.

At 11 PM the President, in a televised speech to the nation, announced his decree dismissing the parliament and ordering early parliamentary elections to be initially held on 27 May. The Rada, passed a motion declaring the decree unconstitutional, in defiance of the president's decree continued to function, issued orders preventing funds allocation for elections, and canceled the order assigning election commission members. The cabinet, supporting the parliament, refused to allocate funds for the new election.

On 3 April 2007, in light of impending political unrest, the United Nations Resident Coordinator, Francis Martin O'Donnell following an earlier call to deepen democracy and liberalize the economy, exceptionally issued an advisory statement of principles on behalf of the Country Team (followed by a visit by former Estonian President Arnold Rüütel on 23 April).

The legality and authority of the President's determination to dismiss Ukraine's previous parliament became the subject of a challenge in Ukraine's Constitutional Court.

On 30 April 2007, on the eve of the Court's ruling on the legality of the President's decrees, Viktor Yushcheko intervened in the operation and independence of Ukraine's Constitutional Court by dismissing three Constitutional Court judges. The President's actions were later determined by Ukrainian courts to have been illegal and one of the judges dismissed has been reinstated; the other two judges resigned. Following the President's intervention the Constitutional Court has not ruled on the legality of the previous parliament's dismissal.

Meeting of Verkhovna Rada on 11 April 2007: the empty seats to the left are allocated for the Opposition.

In a separate issue, some politicians have claimed that identification cards for voting changed hands, as many deputies do not attend parliament in violation of Article 84 of the Constitution.

The Central Election Commission has estimated direct costs of the elections to be at about 340 million UAH ($67 million, £34 million). Yulia Tymoshenko, leader of the parliamentary opposition, commented on the issue of costs:

If the mafia is allowed to continue ruling the country, Ukraine will lose tens of billions of dollars, because Ukraine is being robbed today.

— Yulia Tymoshenko

== Political crisis ==
In April 2007 the Constitutional Court of Ukraine started examining an inquiry submitted by a group of 53 members of parliament who question the constitutional legitimacy of the parliament's dissolution. This inquiry is based on interpretation that the President had no authority under Ukraine's constitution to dissolve parliament under the conditions listed in Article 90 of the Constitution of Ukraine. which is the only article in Ukraine's Constitution that empowers the President to dismiss Ukraine's Parliament. Instead, the decree mentions Articles 5, 69, 77, 83, 102, and 106.

On 4 April, Ivan Dombrovskyy, the Chairman of the Constitutional Court, filed for resignation, stating that he is under pressure. However, the judges rejected it.

On 5 April, Yanukovych has announced that during telephone conversation asked the Austrian Chancellor Alfred Gusenbauer to mediate in the dispute. There was no immediate response from Gusenbauer's office, and Austrian diplomats were surprised by the news about his help request.

On 6 April, the Alliance of National Unity tried to compromise by dismissing the individuals from opposition fractions who had joined them and ratifying a parliamentary law banning individual membership in coalitions.

Four members of Central Election Commission - Yuriy Donchenko, Ihor Kachur, Bronislav Raykovskyy, and Oleksandr Chupakhin (reportedly affiliated with the Anti-Crisis Coalition) took sickness leave - thus effectively blocked work of commission as there is no quorum.

As of 6 April in Constitutional Court, there are constitutional legitimacy questions from the President on an order of the Cabinet Ministers supporting the Verkhovna Rada (Ukraine's parliament) and from 102 deputies on changes done to constitution in 2004.

On 7 April, Feodosiya city court has canceled own order from 5 April that originally disallowed to start elections. Vladimir Kolesnichenko, a spokesperson for the Party of Regions stated that this court ruling is a fake and that the elections are still banned.

On 9 April, the Ukrainian parliament passed a declaration, stating:

Via his entourage and the political circles he relies on, the President of Ukraine interferes with the activities of legislators, brings pressure on judges of Constitutional Court and other courts, since in the legal dimension he does not have any chance to defend his unconstitutional decree.

— 2007 Verkhovna Rada declaration

Furthermore, parliament called upon the heads of European states, governments, and parliaments to send its representatives to mediate the political crisis.

Ukraine's parliament on 9 April, raising the stakes in the country's ongoing political confrontation, stated that it would only support early parliamentary elections if a presidential vote would be held at the same time.

On 10 April, a Luhansk municipal courts' ruling, dated 6 April, banning all preparations for the election was publicly announced. The ruling was a response to an inquiry, submitted by Vladimir Ivanov, a Party of Regions member of parliament. Reportedly, this ruling was canceled. Ivanov has attempted to use labor laws in order to keep his deputy mandate:

I have concluded the employment contract for fixed term, and the President’s decree leaves me and my colleagues without work. This is roughest violation of the labor laws.

— Vladimir Ivanov

Five Constitutional Court judges (Dmytro Lelak, Volodymyr Kampo, Viktor Shyshkin, Petro Stetsyuk, Yaroslava Machuzhak), three of whom were appointed under the presidential quota, refused to participate in review of president order unless they will be given protection by law enforcement. They noted that "certain political forces, acting through their representatives, publicly apply rude pressure on the individual judges and on the Constitutional Court as a whole."

On 12–13 April, both Yanukovych and Yushchenko agreed to abide by the Court's ruling, regardless of its verdict. Furthermore, Yanukovych stated he might agree to parliamentary elections, if the other parties would also agree to participate, even if the Court rules in favor of the Rada.

On 17 April, Ukraine's Constitutional Court, with all 18 judges in attendance, decided to study the appeal against the President's decree non-stop until a final ruling is passed. 11 out of 18 Judges passed this decision.

Ukrainian opposition leader Yulia Tymoshenko described a Constitutional Court decision to review the President's decree dissolving parliament as "a farce," and urged the president to recall the judges appointed on his quota.

The Court has yet to make its decision on the appeal, and was scheduled to announce it on 27 April.

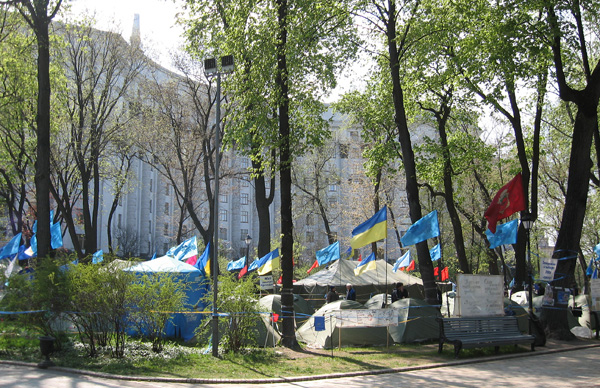
Tent camp of Alliance of National Unity supporters near the building of the government.

Ukrainian Prime Minister Viktor Yanukovych address Council of Europe Parliamentary Assembly stating that the coalition of the majority in Ukraine biggest concern is not that of elections, but the choice between whether Ukraine will be a state ruled by law and all of the emerging problems will be resolved in courts, or on the streets.

Although 17 April was the deadline under established law to submit documents to the Central Election Commission of Ukraine for the registration of party lists, no political force had done so.

=== Parliamentary Assembly of the Council of Europe ===
On 19 April, the Parliamentary Assembly of the Council of Europe held an emergency session to consider issues related to Ukraine's current political crisis. The Assembly passed a resolution calling on all parties to disputation to respect the decision of Ukraine's Constitutional Court whilst criticizing Ukraine's Constitution Imperative mandate provisions.

Parliamentary Assembly rapporteurs on Ukraine - Hanne Severinsen and Renate Wohlwend commented:

The ruling of Ukraine’s Constitutional Court in the current crisis, if delivered, should be accepted as binding by all sides, the Parliamentary Assembly said in a resolution adopted on 19 April at the end of an urgent debate attended by Ukraine’s Parliamentary Speaker Oleksandr Moroz. However, the Assembly also warned that pressure in any form on the judges of the Court was intolerable, and should be investigated and criminally prosecuted.

— Hanne Severinsen and Renate Wohlwend

The "imperative mandate" provision of Ukraine's Constitution came under strong criticism by the Parliamentary Assembly of the Council of Europe as being undemocratic. The Parliamentary Assembly in its Explanatory memorandum had emphasized

Although Ukraine understandably has its own historic reasons to avoid the accumulation of power into the hands of one political force, it should nevertheless consider in the course of future constitutional amendments whether it would not be better for the country to switch to a full parliamentary system with proper checks and balances and guarantees of parliamentary opposition and competition.

— Parliamentary Assembly of the Council of Europe

=== Opposition Members First Resignations ===
On 20 April, leaders of Bloc Yulia Tymoshenko and Bloc Our Ukraine declared that about 150 deputy members of Our Ukraine and Bloc Yulia Tymoshenko had resigned from Ukraine's parliament, as result it claimed that the parliament will be no longer was able to operate constitutionally per Article 82. Their resignations had been submitted to Viktor Yushchenko, then Ukraine's president, who accepted their resignation.

Dmytro Vydrin from the Bloc of Yulia Tymoshenko (BYuT), declared that he had not written an application on abdication, as nobody had not made this request. According to him, "there are three reasons" why he did not give his mandate, reports Delo. "At first, nobody addressed to me with my proposal. Nobody phoned me and told me to write down this application. So how could I write it?" declared the deputy.

Aleksander Kwaśniewski, Poland's former President, believed that Ukraine must find a political compromise and solution to the political crisis facing Ukraine. When asked who is to blame he responded:

Unfortunately, the time after the Orange Revolution was wasted away. President Yushchenko, [the former] Prime Minister Yulia Tymoshenko, advisers like Petro Poroshenko are all to blame. They should have helped building a strong orange bloc, for the sake of modernization and Westernization of Ukraine.

— Aleksander Kwaśniewski

On 25 April, Viktor Yushchenko announced that he has rescheduled the early parliamentary elections to 24 June. On 30 April, the Ukrainian parliament passed a motion calling for presidential and parliamentary elections to be held on 9 December 2007. After negotiations on 4 May, Yanukovych and Yushchenko finally agreed to hold elections in autumn (without specifying a date).

== Dismissal of Constitutional Court judges and Prosecutor General ==
=== Constitutional Court ===
The authority of the President to dismiss Ukraine's parliament was challenged in Ukraine's Constitutional Court amidst concern that the President's actions were unconstitutional in that he had exceeded his authority to dismiss Ukraine's parliament.

An appeal against each of the president's decrees was lodged in the Constitutional Court.

On 19 April the Parliamentary Assembly of the Council of Europe passed a resolution in consideration of a report titled Functioning of democratic institutions in Ukraine. ^{(Items 13 and 14)} stated:

The Assembly deplores the fact that the judicial system of Ukraine has been systematically misused by other branches of power and that top officials do not execute the courts' decisions, which is a sign of erosion of this crucial democratic institution. An independent and impartial judiciary is a precondition for the existence of a democratic society governed by the rule of law. Hence the urgent necessity to carry out comprehensive judicial reform, including through amendments to the constitution. The Assembly reiterates that the authority of the sole body responsible for constitutional justice – the Constitutional Court of Ukraine – should be guaranteed and respected. Any form of pressure on the judges is intolerable and should be investigated and criminally prosecuted. On the other hand, it is regrettable that in the eight months of its new full composition, the Constitutional Court has failed to produce judgments, thus failing to fulfill its constitutional role and to contribute to resolving the crisis in its earlier stages, which undermines the credibility of the court. There is an urgent need for all pending judgments, and in particular the judgment concerning the constitutionality of the Presidential Decree of 2 April 2007, to be delivered. If delivered, the latter should be accepted as binding by all sides.

The associated explanatory report under the sub-heading of Parliamentary Assembly of the Council of Europe - Resolution 1549 (2007) Functioning of democratic institutions in Ukraine expressed concern that

"Several local courts have made decisions to suspend the Presidential Decree only to then withdraw them, allegedly under pressure from the presidential secretariat." ^{(item 67)}

In emphasis the report ^{(item 68)} stated

This is a worrying tendency of legal nihilism that should not be tolerated. It is as clear as day that in a state governed by the rule of law judicial mistakes should be corrected through appeal procedures and not through threats or disciplinary sanctions

On 30 April, on the eve of the Constitutional Court's ruling on the legality of the president's decree dismissing Ukraine's parliament, President Yushchenko, in defiance of the PACE resolution of 19 April intervened in the operation of Ukraine's Constitutional Court by summarily dismissing two Constitutional Court Judges, Syuzanna Stanik and Valeriy Pshenychnyy, for allegations of "oath treason." His move was later overturned by the Constitutional Court and the judges were returned by a temporary restraining order issued by the court.

On 16 May, Viktor Yushchenko, for a second time, issued another decree dismissing the two Constitutional Court Judges Syuzanna Stanik and Valeriy Pshenychnyy.

On 17 May, the Constitutional Court Chairman Ivan Dombrovskyy resigned and Valeriy Pshenychnyy was appointed chairman in replacement.

On 23 May, The Constitutional Court of Ukraine acted to prevent the president's undue influence on the court system. The court's ruling was made after Viktor Yushchenko unduly sought to influence the court by illegally dismissing two Constitutional Court judges Valeriy Pshenychnyy and Syuzanna Stanik for allegations of "oath treason."

Pursuant to Article 149 of Ukraine's Constitution Judges of the Constitutional Court of Ukraine are subject to the guarantees of independence and immunity and to the grounds for dismissal from office envisaged by Article 126, and the requirements concerning incompatibility as determined in Article 127, paragraph two of Ukraine's Constitution

On 20 July Susanna Stanik won an appeal against the President in the Shevchenko district court of Kyiv. The Court ruled the President's actions illegal and reinstated Ms Stanik's entitlement as a member of Ukraine's Constitutional Court. According to the ruling, the President is obliged to cancel his decree on discharge of Mrs. Stanik." The other two judges who were also illegally dismissed had previously tendered their resignations and as such were not subject to the courts order.

Following the president's intervention the Constitutional Court still has not ruled on the question of legality of the president's actions.

Stepan Havrysh, the President's appointee to the Constitutional Court, in prejudgment of the court's decision and without authorization from the Court itself, commented in an interview published on 24 July

I cannot imagine myself as the Constitutional Court in condition in which three political leaders signed a political/legal agreement on holding early elections, which also stipulates the constitutional basis for holding the elections... How the court can agree to consider such a petition under such conditions.

Oleksandr Lavrynovych, Ukrainian Minister for Justice, in an interview published on 3 August is quoted as saying

According to the standards of the Constitution and the laws of Ukraine, these elections should have been recognized invalid already today. But we understand that we speak about the State and about what will happen further in this country. As we've understood, political agreements substitute for the law, ... The situation has been led to the limit, where there are no possibilities to follow all legal norms.

On 25 March 2008 Ukraine's Supreme Administrative Court ruled the President's dismissal of Suzanna Stanik as a Constitutional Court judge illegal. Ms Stanik's position has been reinstated. The decision is final and not subject to further appeal

=== Prosecutor General ===
Recently dismissed Prosecutor General of Ukraine Svyatoslav Piskun breaking into his office, surrounded by Members of the State Protection Department on 24 May 2007.

On 24 May, Yushchenko fired the Prosecutor General of Ukraine, Svyatoslav Piskun, who was appointed by Yushchenko himself on 26 April, after Piskun refused to resign his place in the Verkhovna Rada as was required by the Ukrainian law, so as to not hold two positions at the same time. Yushchenko cited Constitution Article 78 which states "Where there emerge circumstances infringing requirements concerning the incompatibility of the deputy's mandate with other types of activity, the People's Deputy of Ukraine shall within twenty days from the date of the emergence of such circumstances discontinue such activity or lodge a personal application for divesting of People's Deputy authority" and Item 1 of Article 3 of Law No. 2783-IV when issuing his decree on the dismissal of the Prosecutor General. The President appointed Viktor Shemchuk, the Prosecutor General of Crimea, as a replacement to Svyatoslav Piskun. After Piskun's dismissal, thousands of protesters marched to his office in Kyiv protesting his dismissal. Piskun, accompanied by several deputies from the Party of Regions, tried to enter his office in Kyiv, however, were prevented from doing so by the Members of the State Protection Department, with Valeriy Heletey at their lead. Valeriy Heletey and the deputies were later joined by the Communist Party leader Petro Symonenko and supporters of the Party of Regions. The Minister of Internal Affairs of Ukraine, Vasyl Tsushko, ordered Ukraine's Berkut riot police to surround the building, defying Yushchenko's order for the Ukrainian security services not to get involved in the political conflict. Tsushko responded to Yushchenko's dismissal of Piskun as a "coup d'état."

On 25 May, Viktor Yushchenko ordered a decree, taking control over 40,000 interior ministry troops. Meanwhile, the troops were acting on orders of the Interior Minister of Ukraine Vasyl Tsushko, who was charged with abuse of office on 25 May.

On 26 May, thousands of Interior Ministry troops moved towards Ukraine's capital Kyiv on the President's orders. The troops were only lightly armed with riot gear and no lethal weapons. On their way to Kyiv, the troops were stopped by Ukrainian Traffic Police. Deputy Interior Minister Mykhailo Kornienko stated that about 2,050 troops from 13 out of 25 of Ukrainian oblasts were deployed. According to the Vice Commander of the Interior Ministry troops Mykola Mishakin, about 3,480 troops were deployed near Kyiv. Since their entrance into the capital was blocked by Berkut and the Government Automobile Inspection, the Interior Ministry troops would walk to Kyiv. Mykola Mishakin stated:

We will be here as long as it takes so that bloodshed will not occur... and where ever it takes so that there will be no use of force, and to give the politicians a chance to resolve their problems in a peaceful and human way.

After over seven hours of discussions, Yushchenko, Yanukovych, and the Verkhovna Rada Speaker have come to an agreement by setting the date for new parliamentary elections on 30 September 2007.

After coming to a compromise on an election date, the Verkhovna Rada was given two days to accept the new elections and legally prepare for them. The Cabinet of Ministers of Ukraine adopted a bill that would allow funding for the early parliamentary elections, and the Rada approved the necessary laws on 1 June 2007. Yushchenko formally called the election on 5 June 2007, thus ending the political crisis.

== See also ==
- 2006 Ukrainian political crisis
- 2020 Ukrainian constitutional crisis
