= Dmytro Salamatin =

Ukrainian politician (born 1965)

- Дмитро Саламатін
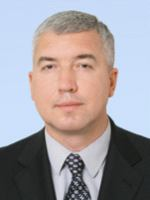
- Official Verkhovna Rada portrait, 2007

Minister of Defence of Ukraine
- In office 8 February 2012 – 24 December 2012
- Preceded by: Mykhailo Yezhel
- Succeeded by: Pavlo Lebedyev

General Director of Ukroboronprom and Ukrspetsexport
- In office 2010–2011

People's Deputy of Ukraine
- In office 25 May 2006 – 5 February 2011

Personal details
- Born: 26 May 1965 (age 61) Karaganda, Kazakh SSR, Soviet Union (now Kazakhstan)
- Education: Moscow State Mining University (1991); Karaganda State Technical University (1989)

Dmytro Albertovych Salamatin (Ukrainian: Дмитро Альбертович Саламатін; born 26 April 1965) is a former Ukrainian politician who last served as the Minister of Defense of Ukraine in 2012. He also served as a People's Deputy of Ukraine from 2006 to 2011.

A member of the Party of Regions, held the position of First Deputy Head of the Parliamentary Committee for Science and Education. Additionally, he was a Member of the Budget Committee.

Salamatin has held various significant roles, including General Director of the State Company for export and import of military and special purpose products and services, known as "Ukrspetsexport", as well as General Director of the State Concern "Ukroboronprom" from 2010 to 2012. He also served as the Minister of Defence of Ukraine from 8 February 2012 to 24 December 2012 and was a Member of the National Security and Defense Council of Ukraine from 17 February 2012 to 24 December 2012.

== Early life and education ==
Born on 26 April 1965 in Karaganda, Kazakh SSR, Salamatin pursued his education and embarked on a career that spanned several fields and locations. Salamatin graduated from the Mining Department of Karaganda Polytechnic Institute in 1989. He obtained a degree in "Technology and Complex Mechanization of Underground Mining of Mineral Resources", Additionally, he completed retraining courses at the Moscow Mining Institute in 1991, earning a degree as an "Engineer Economist".

== Career ==
Between 1983 and 1985, Salamatin fulfilled his military obligations in the Soviet Armed Forces. In 1985, he worked as a miner at the Kuzembaeva mine. From 1989 to 1991, he served as the mine foreman in the mining sector of the same establishment.

In the subsequent years, Salamatin ventured into different roles and locations:

- 1991 to 1993: Consultant at Joint Venture Company SITEK in Moscow.
- 1993 to 1994: Commercial Director at "Russkoe Toplivo" CJSC in Moscow.
- 1995 to 1996: Chief Expert at "ROL" CJSC in Moscow.
- 1996 to 1997: Principal Adviser at Milder International Ltd. Company in Moscow.

Starting from 1998, Salamatin became a Presidential Adviser for the International Mining Congress, focusing on interactions with Ukraine. In April 1999, Salamatin relocated to Ukraine, where he obtained Ukrainian citizenship in 2004.

He was twice elected as the People's Deputy of Ukraine of the Party of Regions (2006 -2011), he was the First Deputy Head of the Parliamentary Committee for Science and Education and the Member of the Budget Committee. Our Ukraine–People's Self-Defense Bloc People's Deputy of Ukraine Volodymyr Stretovych claimed in April 2012 that Salamatin had received Ukrainian citizenship in 2005 and thus was illegally elected into parliament in 2007. According to Central Election Commission of Ukraine member Mykhaylo Okhendovsky Salamatin was legally electable in 2007, because he had been living in Ukraine the prior 5 years.

- 2010 – General Director of the State Company for export and import of military and special purpose products and services.
- 2011 – General Director of the State Concern "Ukroboronprom”
- From 8 February 2012[2] to 24 December 2012[3] – the Minister of Defense of Ukraine in the first Azarov government.
- He was appointed as the Adviser to President of Ukraine Viktor Yanukovych on 25 December 2012. He stayed his advisor until February 2014.

=== Defence-Industrial Complex of Ukraine ===
The revenue from export of products of the Subsidiary Company "Ukrspetsexport" and its subsidiaries increased by 27% in 2011 and for the first time exceeded $1 bln,

This result was achieved again in 2012 when he was the Ministry of Defense of Ukraine.

During this time Ukraine has achieved strategic partnership with Thailand. Lot of Ukrainian APC-ZE1 was supplied to this country. Thailand also ordered the advanced "Oplot" tanks. Total amount of the contract was half a billion dollars. He reformed the whole Defense-Industrial Complex of Ukraine in 2011 in the capacity of the Director of the Subsidiary Company "Ukroboronprom". Great portion of indebtedness of the Defense and Industrial Complex enterprises was written off, ensuring the development and proceeding to repayment of arrears in salaries. Exporters were combined into the state concern with the industrial enterprises for the first time, thus enabling to increase the production rate. In the result the number of aircraft of the Armed Forces of Ukraine was doubled as early as 2012. Almost all ships and vessels of the Maritime Forces of Ukraine were repaired; navigation and communication means, new parachute systems and many others were supplied to the troops.

=== Ministry of Defence of Ukraine ===
During the period of his activity as the Minister of Defence of Ukraine in 2012 the average training time of one pilot was reached 51 hours for the first time since gaining the independence, about 42000 parachute jumps were made, considerably exceeding the previous years' figures., First All-Ukrainian tank competitions, starting a real heavy training of the tank troops' specialists, were held at the initiative of the Head of Defence Agency.

High mobility landing troops (airborne troops) of the Armed Forces of Ukraine had been formed on the basis of airborne and airmobile forces.

Precision guided artillery round "Kvitnyk", Armoured Personnel Carrier APC4Е, 30-mm autocannon ZТМ-1 and many other models of armament were put into service. Maneuvers "Perspective 2012" were held in September – October 2012. Perspective systems of control and communication C2/C4i were firstly practiced to perfection at these maneuvers. Military delegation headed by the Minister of Defense of Ukraine visited Afghanistan.

The concept of the Armed Forces of Ukraine transition to NATO standards by 2014 had been adopted, and English language training system has been introduced. Salamantin claimed in December 2012 that for the first time for many years full-strength fighting squadron appeared in effective combat strength of the Ukrainian Air Force.

Due to conflicts between President Yanukovych and his inner circle in 2012 Salamantin was dismissed as Minister of Defense in December 2012.

=== Post-government ===
Salamatin moved to Russia in 2013 and according to Ukrainian authorities lives there since. They also claim that in 2015 Salamatin visited incognito the separatist Luhansk People's Republic.

In January 2019 the Prosecutor General of Ukraine Office announced they were suspecting Salamatin of a crime, they suspected him of "intentional actions aimed at ousting Ukraine from the world arms markets in favor of Russia" and thus he was suspected of "abusing his official position and committing treason in the interests of the Russian Federation". Salamatin's actions allegedly cost Ukraine $560 million.

In November 2021 the High Anti-Corruption Court of Ukraine called for Salamatin's arrest in a case of embezzlement of more than 23.87 million US dollars. In August 2023 this court started an investigation into Salamatin's alleged embezzlement during his tenure at Subsidiary Company "Ukrspetsexport".

== Family ==
Salamantin is married to Natalia. The couple has three sons (born in 1994, 1996 and 2002). Salamatin’s father-in-law Oleg Soskovets was First Deputy Prime Minister of Russia from 1993 until 1996.

== Interview ==
- Министр обороны Саламатин: Проведенную в армии и ОПК работу я бы оценил как наступление по всем фронтам

Political offices
| Preceded by Mykhailo Yezhel | Minister of Defence; 2012 | Succeeded by Pavlo Lebedyev |
