= Ukrainian political crisis =

Ukrainian political crisis may refer to:

- 2000–2001 Ukrainian political crisis (Cassette Scandal)
- 2004–2005 Ukrainian political crisis (Orange Revolution)
- 2006 Ukrainian political crisis
- 2007 Ukrainian political crisis
- 2008 Ukrainian political crisis
- 2013–2014 Ukrainian political crisis (Revolution of Dignity)
- 2020–2022 Ukrainian constitutional crisis
