= Usenko =

Usenko (Ukrainian: Усенко) is a gender-neutral Ukrainian surname. It may refer to:

- Ivan Usenko (born 1983), Belarusian ice hockey player
- Matvei Usenko (1898–1943), Soviet major general
- Nadiya Usenko (born 2000), Ukrainian squash player
- Nikolai Usenko (1924–1996), Soviet soldier
- Olena Usenko (born 2007), Ukrainian singer
- Zhanna Usenko-Chorna (born 1973), Ukrainian lawyer
