= Serhiy Holovatyi =

Ukrainian lawyer and politician

- Сергій Головатий
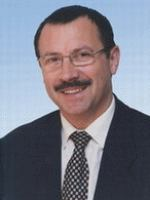
- Official portrait, 2007

Chairman of the Constitutional Court of Ukraine (acting)
- In office 15 May 2022 – 29 September 2024

Judge of the Constitutional Court of Ukraine
- In office 2 March 2018 – 29 September 2024

Minister of Justice
- In office 27 September 2005 – 4 August 2006
- Prime Minister: Yuriy Yekhanurov
- Preceded by: Roman Zvarych
- Succeeded by: Roman Zvarych
- In office 27 September 1995 – 21 August 1997
- Prime Minister: Yevhen Marchuk; Pavlo Lazarenko; Valeriy Pustovoitenko
- Preceded by: Vasyl Onopenko
- Succeeded by: Syuzanna Stanik

People's Deputy of the Verkhovna Rada
- In office 15 May 1990 – 12 December 2012

Personal details
- Born: 29 May 1954 (age 71) Odesa, Ukrainian SSR, Soviet Union
- Occupation: Politician, lawyer

Serhiy Petrovych Holovatyi (Ukrainian: Сергій Петрович Головатий; born 29 May 1954) is a Ukrainian lawyer, politician, former member of parliament, and former Minister of Justice of Ukraine. He is a judge of the Constitutional Court of Ukraine and has been the Acting Chairman of the Constitutional Court of Ukraine since 29 December 2020. He served as a Member of the Ukrainian Parliament during the I to VI convocations and as the Minister of Justice of Ukraine in 1995-1997 and 2005-2006. He is a former member of the Communist Party of the Soviet Union (CPSU). In the Verkhovna Rada of Ukraine, he was a member of various parliamentary factions and groups, including Our Ukraine, BYuT (Yulia Tymoshenko Bloc), and the Party of Regions.

== Early life and research ==
Holovatyi was born on 29 May 1954 in Odesa, which was then part of the Ukrainian SSR in the Soviet Union. His father was part of the military, serving in the Soviet Armed Forces. After graduating secondary school, Holovatyi worked briefly as a packer for finished products in a bakery in Smila, before attending the Taras Shevchenko National University of Kyiv within the Faculty of International Relations and International Law. He graduated from the university in 1977 with a degree in international law. He was then for the next three years a postgraduate student in the departments of history and law at his alma mater, and then from 1980 to 1987 was a junior researcher. He was also a professor in the Department of International Law and Foreign Legislation at the university during his time as a junior researcher.

From 1987 to 1990 he was a senior researcher for the Institute of Social and Economic Problems of Foreign Countries for the Academy of Sciences of the Ukrainian SSR. After the collapse of the Soviet Union, he was part of the commission that drafted the new Constitution of Ukraine. He also later carried out research at the Max Planck Institute for Comparative Public Law and International Law in 2001, from 2002 to 2003 under a Fulbright Scholarship he did research at the Yale University School of Law, and then again at the Max Planck Institute from 2013 to 2014. From 2011 to 2013 he returned to his alma mater to be a professor in the Department of Theory of Law. Simultaneously, he was a member of the Venice Commission for multiple terms.

== Political career ==
In 1990 he was elected to the Verkhovna Rada during the 1990 Ukrainian parliamentary election. He served in the Rada for six convocations, up until 2012.

== Judicial career ==
On 27 February 2018 he was appointed a judge of the Constitutional Court of Ukraine. On 2 March he took the oath of office and began to perform judicial duties. Chairman of the Standing Committee on Legal Terminology of the Constitutional Court of Ukraine. Deputy Chairman of the Constitutional Court of Ukraine since 17 September 2019.

Since 29 December 2020 he has been acting President of the Constitutional Court of Ukraine in accordance with Article 33 of the Law of Ukraine “On the Constitutional Court of Ukraine”. On 30 May 2024 his powers were terminated upon reaching the age of 70.
