= Universal (act) =

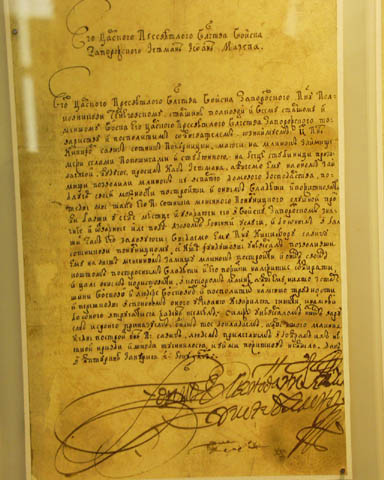
A Universal on Taxation of gristmills by Ivan Mazepa

Universal (Polish: Uniwersał; Lithuanian: Universalas; Ukrainian: Універсал) is a historic term that means an official proclamation or legal act. In several historic periods Universals were issued in the Polish–Lithuanian Commonwealth by the Polish, Lithuanian and later also by Ukrainian authorities. The name originates from Latin litterae universales, meaning universal publication directed to all. The term was recently revived in modern Ukraine where the Universal of National Unity, a political multiparty agreement signed on 3 August 2006, ended a parliamentary crisis.

== Poland and Lithuania ==
Universals were issued by the kings and governing authorities of the Kingdom of Poland and the Polish–Lithuanian Commonwealth. In the Commonwealth, a universal could be a letter from the king read publicly to address significant events or a legal act by the king related to economic, military or religious matters. Universals were also routinely used to call the szlachta to assemble for a Sejm, or to report for pospolite ruszenie (or common levy). Universals could also be issued by high officials of the Commonwealth, like hetmans commanding military forces or voievodes overseeing a voivodeship. One of the most significant universals was the Uniwersał Połaniecki issued by Tadeusz Kościuszko in 1794, which proclaimed the end of serfdom.

== Ukraine ==
In Ukrainian history, Universals has been used as a name for the act issued by the authorities. The main purpose of the Universal was to inform the people of the important decisions taken by the authorities. Thus, Universal is sometimes used interchangeably with Declaration.

=== Cossack times ===
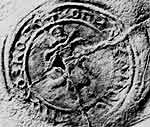
The seal of Hetman Havrylo Krutnevych attached to 1603 Universal.

Between the sixteenth and eighteenth centuries, the Universals were issued by the Cossack leadership, such as Hetmans, other members of Starshyna (Cossack nobility) and Polkovnyks.

=== Ukraine People's Republic ===
In 1917–1918 four Universals were issued by the Central Council of Ukraine, the leading body of the short-lived Ukrainian People's Republic. These documents marked the main stages of the development of the nascent Ukrainian state, from the proclamation of its autonomy to the declaration of full independence.

Act number	Adaptation	Details
1	23 [O.S. 1917] June	Declared the announcement of Ukraine national autonomy as part of Russian Republic
2	16 [O.S. 1917] July	Compromise with the Russian Provisional Government announcing that the final form of Ukraine autonomy will decide the Russian Constituent Assembly
3	20 [O.S. 1917] November	Announced Ukrainian People's Republic: Ukraine does not completely break away from Russia
4	22 [O.S. 1918] January	Declared independence of Ukraine

=== Modern revival ===
During the 2006 Parliamentary crisis in Ukraine, the term was revived on the initiative of Viktor Yushchenko, a President of Ukraine. After difficult and, at times, tense negotiations between the President and several political forces representing the Parliamentary factions, all sides eventually agreed to a powersharing compromise that led to an expanded governmental coalition and agreed to sign a compromise document titled a Universal of National Unity.

== See also ==
- Act Zluky, a universal issued by the Directorate of UPR
