= Andriy Stryzhak =

Andriy Stryzhak may refer to:

- Andriy Stryzhak (judge)
- Andriy Stryzhak (footballer)
