= Pavlo Lebedyev =

Ukrainian politician (born 1962)

- Павло Лебедєв
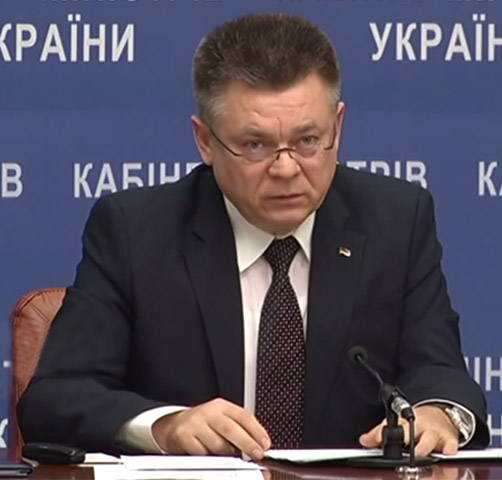
- Lebedyev in 2014

Minister of Defense
- In office 24 December 2012 – 27 February 2014
- Prime Minister: Mykola Azarov
- Preceded by: Dmytro Salamatin
- Succeeded by: Ihor Tenyukh

People's Deputy of Ukraine
- In office 25 May 2006 – 22 March 2013
- In office 25 May 2006 – 12 December 2012
- Constituency: Party list
- In office 12 December 2012 – 22 March 2013
- Preceded by: New seat
- Succeeded by: Vadym Novynskyi
- Constituency: 224th (Sevastopol)

Personal details
- Born: 12 July 1962 (age 64) Novomikhailovsky, Krasnodar Krai, Russian SFSR, Soviet Union
- Party: Rodina
- Other political affiliations: Party of Regions (2007-2014); Yulia Tymoshenko Bloc (2006-2007)
- Education: Yaroslavl Military-Finance College
- Occupation: Politician

Pavlo Valentynovych Lebedyev (Ukrainian: Павло Валентинович Лебедєв, Russian: Павел Валентинович Лебедев; born 12 July 1962) is a Russian and former Ukrainian politician, financier and businessman who is currently a member of the Board of Russian Union of Industrialists and Entrepreneurs (RUIE). Head of Coordination Council of the Crimean branches of RUIE.

Lebedyev had served as the Minister of Defense of Ukraine from 2012 to 2014. He also served as a member of the Verkhovna Rada from 2006 to 2013.

While officially still being Ukraine's Defence Minister Lebedyev moved to Crimea and stayed there amidst the 2014 Russian annexation of Crimea from Ukraine. Since 14 March 2016 he is wanted by the General Prosecutor's Office of Ukraine on suspicion of criminal activities and desertion.

== Early life and military career ==
Lebedyev was born on 12 July 1962 in Novomikhailovskiy, Tuapsinsky District, Krasnodar Krai, Russian SFSR. From 1979 to 1980 Lebedyev worked as a mechanic in the motorpool of the Summer camp "Orlyonok". Enrolling to the Yaroslavl Military-Finance College he graduated it in 1984, and had lived in Kyiv for quite some time.

From 1984 to 1993, he served in the Chernivtsi military garrison as the head of the financial service of the battalion, regiment; deputy head of the financial service of division – inspector-controller.

== In business ==
From 1993 to 1999, he was the founder of the commercial company Legteh LLC, later became the chairman of the board of OJSC "Leather haberdashery factory Prestige-Inter" (Chernivtsi). From 1994 to 2000, he was the deputy of the Chernivtsi City Council, the chairman of the budget commission and privatization commission.

From 1999 to 2002 he was the financial director of the chemical state joint-stock company SJSC "Titan" (Armiansk). After privatization the enterprise was transformed into a private joint-stock company "Crimean Titan". From 2002 to 2005, he held the position of the chairman of the supervisory board, OJSC Kremenchuk Steel Mill.

From 2005 to 2006, he was the president of the group of transport engineering "Inter Car Group" (Kyiv), uniting 18 industrial enterprises. The group also included Crimean groups Parangon (construction) and Gala Motors (foreign modes trade), shopping malls in Chernivtsi, dentist's in Kyiv, agrofirm Azalia in Simferopol, five-star hotel complex Akvamarin, water park Zurbagan, enterprises of catering in Sevastopol.

== Political career ==
From 2006 to 2013 – People's Deputy of Ukraine of three convocations (V-VI-VII). In the 2006 Ukrainian parliamentary election he was elected for the Yulia Tymoshenko Bloc. In the 2007 Ukrainian parliamentary election he was elected for Party of Regions. In the 2012 Ukrainian parliamentary election he was reelected for this party after winning a constituency seat in Sevastopol. In Verkhovna Rada (Ukraine's parliament) Lebedyev was a member of the transportation and communication committee.

In 2011, he was entered the "Golden Hundred" rating, taking 91st place (with assets of $57 million as of 2011).

== Minister of defense ==
On 24 December 2012, he was appointed the minister of defence by Decree No. 740/2012 of the president of Ukraine Viktor Yanukovich. On 22 March 2013, Verkhovna Rada annulled his parliamentary mandate.

In a position of Minister of Defense, he initiated a full transition to the contractual principle of army formation. By August 2013 the manpower of the Ukrainian army with contract servicemen reached level of 58%.

In a position of Minister of Defense of Ukraine, during the political crisis in Ukraine and protest actions at the 2013/2014 Euromaidan, after numerous pleas of politicians with an appeal to bring the army to protect the constitutional order, Lebedyev refused to bring the troops, on 26 January stating that the Ukrainian army would not interfere in the confrontation between the acting power and opposition. During the 2014 Ukrainian revolution on 19 February Lebedyev sent to Kyiv the 25th Separate Dnipropetrovsk Airborne Brigade by his order in the framework of the anti-terrorist operation of SSU to strengthen the protection of military arsenals and prevent theft of weapons and ammunition. On 21 February, there was a telephone conversation between the Minister of Defense of Ukraine and the United States Lebedyev and Chuck Hagel, who warned Lebedyev against the possible expansion of the participation of Ukrainian troops in the conflict.

On 28 January 2014 Prime Minister of Ukraine Mykola Azarov and the entire composition of the Government of Ukraine were dismissed by Decree No. 52/2014 of the President Yanukovich. All ministers, including Lebedyev, continued to fulfill their duties until the appointment of a new composition of the government. On 21 February 2014, the day when the "Agreement on settlement of political crisis in Ukraine" was struck during the Euromaidan demonstrations, Lebedyev left Kyiv and moved to Sevastopol. Hence Lebedyev had already left office before he could have been dismissed by parliament. On 27 February 2014 parliament officially dismissed Lebedyev, appointing in his place acting Minister of Defense Ihor Tenyukh.

== Post-2014 ==
Lebedyev was present at the official Kremlin signing of the 2014 Russian annexation of Crimea treaty by Russian president Vladimir Putin and Crimean leaders in Moscow on 18 March 2014. (Since the annexation of Crimea by the Russian Federation, the status of the Crimea and of the city of Sevastopol is under dispute between Russia and Ukraine; Ukraine and the majority of the international community considers the Crimea and Sevastopol an integral part of Ukraine, while Russia, on the other hand, considers the Crimea and Sevastopol an integral part of Russia, with Sevastopol functioning as a federal city within the Southern Federal District.) Following this he ran for a seat in the Sevastopol City Council for the Russian political party Rodina. In March 2014 Lebedyev was candidate of Governor of Sevastopol.

14 March 2016, he was placed on the wanted list by the General Prosecutor's Office of Ukraine on suspicion of criminal activities and desertion.

On 14 October 2015, Lebedev joined the collegial governing body of the Russian Union of Industrialists and Entrepreneurs (RUIE). On 16 October 2015, he was elected as the head of the coordinating council of the Crimean branches of Russian Union of Industrialists and Entrepreneurs. Deputy Chairman of Sevastopol Regional Branch of Russian Union of Industrialists and Entrepreneurs.

== Awards ==
- Medal "For Distinction in Military Service" (USSR)
- Honored Economist of Ukraine
- Laureate of the State Prize of the Republic of Crimea

== Family ==
Wife: Lebedieva Liudmila Petrovna (born in 1965). According to an investigation by Al Jazeera she bought Cypriot citizenship somewhere between 2017 and 2019.

Children: Aliona (born in 1983), Yulia (born in 1993), Aleksandra (born in 1994), Valeriia (born in 1997), Anastasiia (born in 2002).
