= Valeriy Pshenychnyy =

- Валерій Пшеничний

Acting Chairman of the Constitutional Court of Ukraine
- In office 17 May 2007 – 10 July 2007
- Nominated by: Leonid Kuchma
- Preceded by: Ivan Dombrovskyy
- Succeeded by: Andriy Stryzhak

Personal details
- Born: 3 March 1951 (age 75) Tavriiske, Dnipropetrovsk Oblast

Valeriy Hryhorovych Pshenychnyy (Ukrainian: Валерій Григорович Пшеничний; born 1951 in Tavriiske, Dnipropetrovsk Oblast) is a Ukrainian jurist and former judge of the Constitutional Court of Ukraine. During the 2006–2007 political crises he and Syuzanna Stanik were one of key people which were involved in the crisis.

After graduating the Kharkiv Law Institute in 1976, he was elected a people judge at the Pecherskyi District in Kiev. In 1981-1982 Pshenychnyi was an instructor of the Pecherskyi District Committee of the Communist Party. In 1982-1990 he worked in the Division of affairs of the Council of Ministers of the Ukrainian SSR. In 1993-1997 he was placed in charge of the department of law enforcement agencies within the Secretariat of the Cabinet of Ukraine. In 1997-2003 Pshenychnyy worked in the Secretariat of the Constitutional Court of Ukraine.

He was a President's quota-appointed judge of the Constitutional Court of Ukraine from 4 February 2003 to 16 May 2007, and its chairman since 17 May 2007. He was first appointed by the then President Leonid Kuchma, and named acting chairman after Ivan Dombrovskyy resigned on 17 May 2007.

Pshenychnyy was dismissed on 30 April 2007 by the current President Viktor Yushchenko after allegations of oath treason. Pshenychnyy was yet again fired by President Yushchenko on 16 May 2007.

== Footnotes ==
Legal offices
Preceded by Ivan Dombrovskyy	Chairman of the Constitutional Court of Ukraine; Acting; 2007	Succeeded by Andriy Stryzhak
