= Constitutional Court of Ukraine =

Judicial institution in Ukraine dealing with constitutional law

Coordinates: 50°26′03″N 30°30′51″E

- Конституційний Суд України
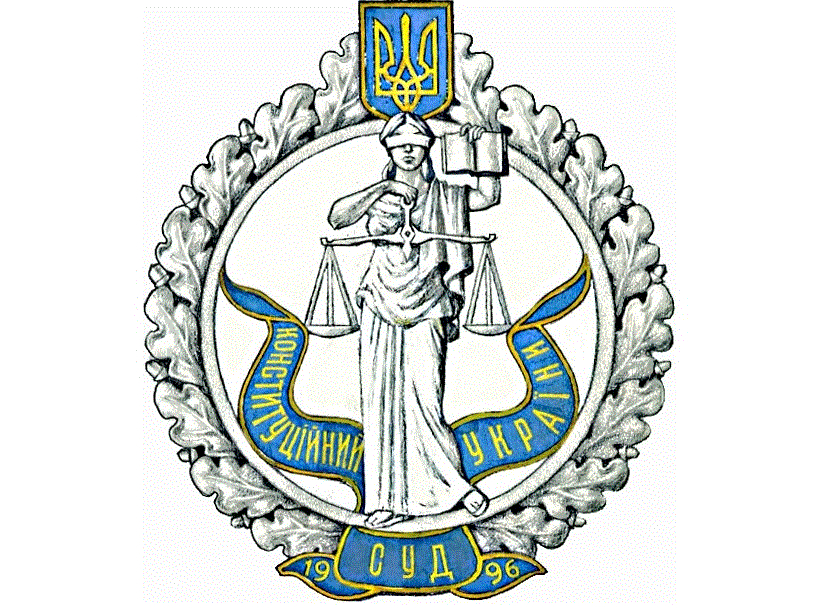
- Interactive map of Constitutional Court of Ukraine
- Established: 1992; acts since 1996
- Location: 14 Zhylianska St, Kyiv, Ukraine
- Composition method: Presidential, Parliamentary and Congress of Judges nomination
- Authorised by: Ukrainian Constitution
- Judge term length: 9; prohibited if aged 65
- Number of positions: 18 (assigned by President, Parliament, Congress of Judges; 6 each)
- Website: ccu.gov.ua/en

Chairman
- Currently: vacant
- Since: 15 May 2022

Acting chairman
- Currently: Oleksandr Petryshyn
- Since: 27 January 2025

The Constitutional Court of Ukraine (Ukrainian: Конституційний Суд України, romanized: Konstytutsiinyi Sud Ukrainy, pronounced [konstɪtʊˈts⁽ʲ⁾ijnɪj ˈsud ʊkrɐˈjinɪ]) interprets the Constitution of Ukraine in terms of laws and other legal acts.

The Court initiated its activity on 18 October 1996. The first Court ruling was made on 13 May 1997.

On urgent matters the Constitutional Court rules within weeks, but on matters deemed less urgent it can take months.

Decisions of the Constitutional Court are binding, final, and cannot be appealed.

== Mission and authority ==
In 2016 access to the Constitutional Court was significantly broadened. Since then all individuals and companies where there are grounds to claim that a final court judgment contradicts the Constitution can file a complaint at the court. Previously only the President and a member of parliament had the right to appeal to the Constitutional Court. A complaint may only be filed after all other remedies have been exhausted in the regular Ukrainian courts.

The authority of the Constitutional Court is derived from Ukraine's Constitution – Chapter XII

The Court:

- on the appeal of the President, no less than 45 members of the parliament, the Supreme Court of Ukraine, the Ombudsman, or the Crimean parliament, assesses the constitutionality of:
  - laws and other legal acts of the parliament
  - acts of the President
  - acts of the Cabinet
  - legal acts of the Verkhovna Rada of the Autonomous Republic of Crimea (Crimean parliament)
- officially interprets the Constitution and laws of Ukraine
- on the appeal of the President or the Cabinet, provides opinions on the conformity with the Constitution of international treaties
- on the appeal of the parliament, provides an opinion on the observance of the procedure of impeachment of the President
- provides an opinion on the compliance of a bill on introducing amendments to the Constitution with the restrictions imposed by the Constitution.

The Court's rulings are mandatory for execution in Ukraine, are final and cannot be appealed. Laws and other legal acts, or their separate provisions, that are deemed unconstitutional, lose legal force.

== Structure ==
The Court is composed of 18 judges, appointed in equal shares by the President, the parliament, and the Congress of Judges.

A judge must be a citizen of Ukraine and must have:

- attained the age of forty;
- a higher legal education and professional experience of no less than 10 years;
- resided in Ukraine for the last twenty years;
- command of the state language (Ukrainian language)

Judges are appointed for 9 years without the right of reappointment; moreover each judge is obligated to retire at the age of 65 if this age comes before the end of the 9-year period. The President and parliament are required to fill a vacant position within one month and the Congress of judges has three months to do so. But the appointment comes into effect only after oath of the new judge in the parliament; therefore sometimes it is a problem to become a judge of the Constitutional Court if many members of parliament do not want this (for example, they can physically disturb to hold a meeting of the parliament, that is usual in Ukraine).

The Chairman of the Court is elected by secret ballot for a single three-year term from and by the members of the Court.

== Controversies ==
On 29 December 1999 the Court interpreted the Constitution as unconditionally ruling out capital punishment; this is the date when Ukraine de jure abolished capital punishment after a long period of a de facto moratorium.

In the 2000s attempts to bribe and blackmail Constitutional Court judges to get a favourable ruling were reported.

On 14 November 2001 the Court outlawed the institution of propiska.

On 25 December 2003 the Court allowed Leonid Kuchma to run for presidency for the third time; Kuchma chose not to run for re-election.

Amidst the 2007 Ukrainian political crisis, on 30 April 2007, on the eve of the Constitutional Court's ruling on the legality of the president's decree dismissing Ukraine's parliament, President Yushchenko, in defiance of the PACE resolution of 19 April intervened in the operation of Ukraine's Constitutional Court by summarily dismissing two Constitutional Court Judges, Syuzanna Stanik and Valeriy Pshenychnyy, for allegations of "oath treason." His move was later overturned by the Constitutional Court and the judges were returned by a temporary restraining order issued by the court. On 16 May, Viktor Yushchenko, for a second time, issued another decree dismissing the two Constitutional Court Judges Syuzanna Stanik and Valeriy Pshenychnyy. On 17 May, the Constitutional Court chairman Ivan Dombrovskyy resigned and was replaced by Valeriy Pshenychnyy. On 23 May, The Constitutional Court of Ukraine acted to prevent the president's undue influence on the court system. The court's ruling was made after Viktor Yushchenko was accused of unduly seeing to influence the court by illegally firing two Constitutional Court judges Valeriy Pshenychnyy and Syuzanna Stanik for allegations of "oath treason.". On 20 July, Syuzanna Stanik won an appeal against the President in the Shevchenko district court of Kyiv. The Court ruled the President's actions illegal and reinstated Ms Stanik's entitlement as a member of Ukraine's Constitutional Court. According to the ruling, the President is obliged to cancel his decree on discharge of Mrs. Stanik.." The other two judges who were also illegally dismissed had previously tendered their resignations and as such were not subject to the courts order. Following the president's intervention the Constitutional Court still has not ruled on the question of legality of the president's actions. On 25 March 2008 Ukraine's Supreme Administrative Court ruled the President's dismissal of Syuzanna Stanik as a Constitutional Court judge illegal. Ms Stanik's position has been reinstated. The decision is final and not subject to further appeal On 3 April 2008 Stanik was dismissed from the Court by the order of the President. On 28 April 2010, President Viktor Yanukovych reinstated Stanik as Constitutional Court judge. She resigned the next day.

On 1 October 2010 the Court determined the 2004 amendments to the Constitution of Ukraine unconstitutional, repealing them. On 21 February 2014 parliament passed a law that reinstated these December 2004 amendments (of the constitution).

On 27 October 2020 the court decision to repeal Article 366-1 of the Criminal Code of Ukraine, which had provided for liability for inaccurate declaration of assets by government officials pushed Ukraine into the 2020 Ukrainian constitutional crisis. This decision de facto invalidated much of Ukraine's 2014 anti-corruption reform as unconstitutional. On 29 December 2020 President Volodymyr Zelenskyy suspended the courts chairperson Oleksandr Tupytskyi for two months in an effort to end the crisis. On 26 February 2021 President Zelenskyy signed a decree that suspended chairperson Tupytskyi for another month. On 27 March 2021 Zelenskyy annulled the decree of former President Viktor Yanukovych of May 2013, appointing Oleksandr Tupytskyi a judge of the Constitutional Court of Ukraine. The reason given was that allegedly his tenure did "pose a threat to state independence and national security of Ukraine, which violates the Constitution of Ukraine, human and civil rights and freedoms." As a result, for some time, it was unclear who was the Chairperson of the Court.

=== Reforms ===
On 17 August 2023, the President of Ukraine Volodymyr Zelenskyy signed the law on the selection of judges of the Constitutional Court.

At the end of July 2023, the Verkhovna Rada adopted the Law of Ukraine on the selection of judges of the Constitutional Court with the participation of international experts. According to the law, the selection will be carried out with the participation of the Advisory Group of Experts. Half of these experts will be people delegated by international organizations and the Venice Commission, who will have a decisive vote in filtering candidates for the Constitutional Court. This law was one of the requirements of the European Commission for the start of negotiations on Ukraine's accession to the European Union.

== Membership ==
=== List of judges ===
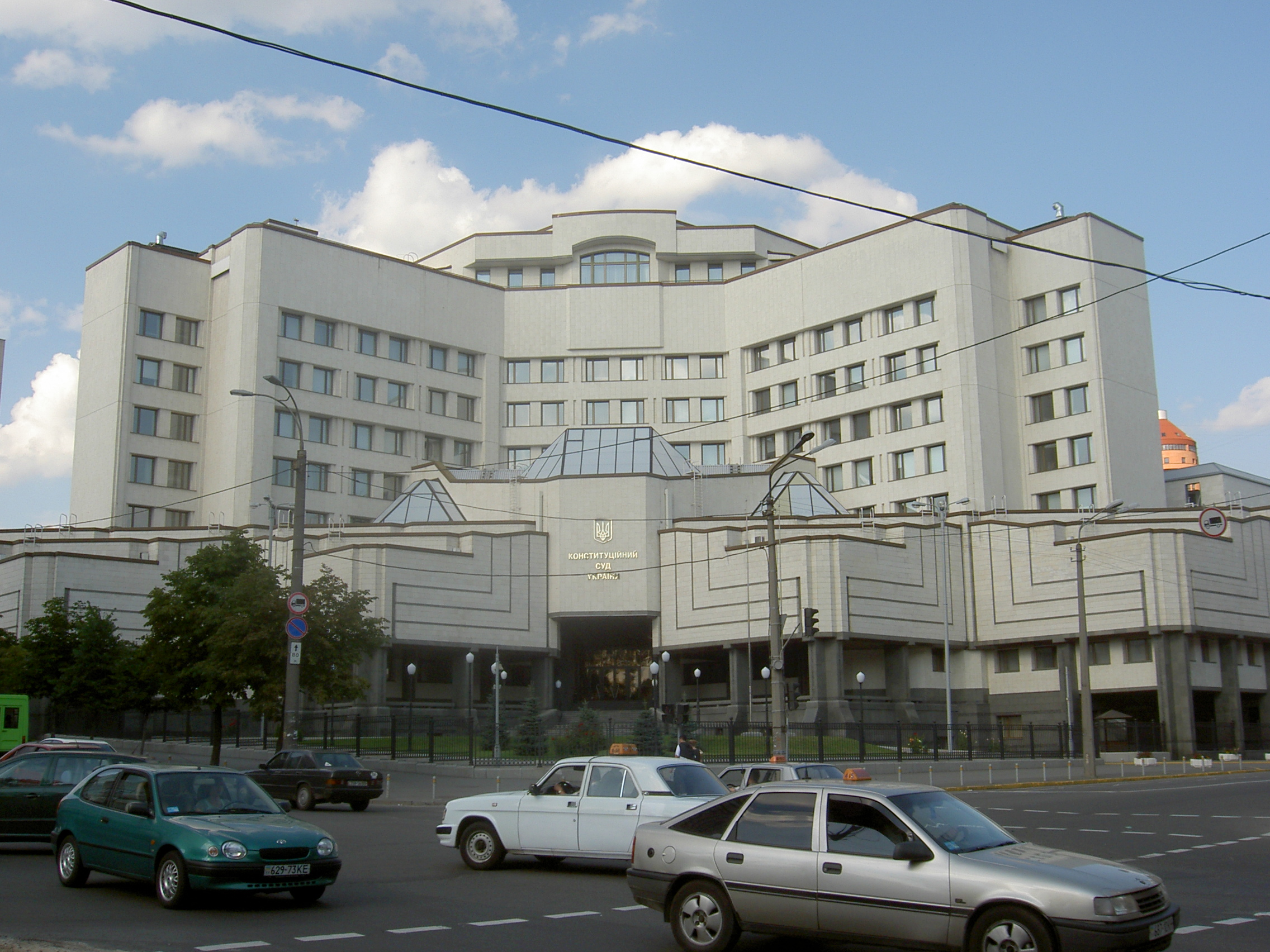
Constitutional Court in Kyiv

- President's quota:
  - Volodymyr Kampo (Володимир Михайлович Кампо) since 4 August 2006
  - Dmytro Lylak (Дмитро Дмитрович Лилак) since 4 August 2006
  - Viktor Shyshkin (Віктор Іванович Шишкін) since 4 August 2006
  - Yurij Baulin (Юрій Васильович Баулін) since 3 June 2007
  - Sergij Vdovichenko (Вдовіченко Сергій Леонідович) since 3 June 2007
  - Yurij Nikitin (Юрій Іванович Нікітін) since 3 June 2007
- Parliament's quota:

Dismissed in 2014

- Congress of judges' quota:
  - Vasyl Bryntsev (Василь Дмитрович Бринцев) since 4 August 2006
  - Vyacheslav Dzhun' (В’ячеслав Васильович Джунь) since 4 August 2006
  - Anatoliy Didkivskyy (Анатолій Олександрович Дідківський) since 4 August 2006
  - Ivan Dombrovskyy (Іван Петрович Домбровський) since 4 August 2006;
  - Yaroslava Machuzhak (Ярослава Василівна Мачужак) since 4 August 2006
  - Andriy Stryzhak (Андрій Андрійович Стрижак) since 4 August 2006 (appointed to the court in 2004, but not sworn in until 2006)

==== Chairpersons ====
- 1992–1995 Leonid Yuzkov
- 1996–1999 Ivan Tymchenko
- 1999–2002 Viktor Skomorokha
- 2002–2005 Mykola Selivon
- 2005–2006 Pavlo Yevhrafov (acting)
- 2006-2006 Volodymyr Ivashchenko (acting)
- 2006–2007 Ivan Dombrovskyy
- 2007-2007 Valeriy Pshenychnyy (acting)
- 2007–2010 Andriy Stryzhak
- 2010–2013 Anatolii Holovin
- 2013–2014 Vyacheslav Ovcharenko
- 2014–2017 Yuriy Baulin
- 2017–2018 Viktor Kryvenko (acting)
- 2018–2019 Stanislav Shevchuk
- 2019 Nataliya Shaptala (acting)
- 2019–2022 Oleksandr Tupytskyi

On 29 December 2020 President Volodymyr Zelenskyy suspended Tupytskyi for two months in an effort to end the 2020 Ukrainian constitutional crisis.

- 2022-2024 Serhiy Holovatyi
- 2024-2025 Viktor Kryvenko
- 2025–present Oleksandr Petryshyn

== See also ==
- Constitutionalism
- Constitutional economics
- Jurisprudence
- Rule According to Higher Law
