= Mykola Selivon =

- Микола Селівон

Chairman of the Constitutional Court of Ukraine
- In office 19 October 2002 – 18 October 2005
- Nominated by: Leonid Kuchma
- President: Leonid Kuchma; Viktor Yushchenko
- Preceded by: Viktor Skomorokha
- Succeeded by: Ivan Dombrovskyi

Ambassador of Ukraine to Kazakhstan
- In office 10 May 2006 – 29 June 2010
- President: Viktor Yushchenko; Viktor Yanukovych
- Preceded by: Vasyl Tsybenko
- Succeeded by: Oleh Dyomin

Personal details
- Born: 30 October 1946 (age 79) Shestovytsia, Chernihiv Raion, Ukrainian SSR
- Education: Kiev University Law Faculty (1968–73); NANU Institute of State and Law (1978)
- Occupation: Jurist, judge, diplomat

Mykola Selivon (Ukrainian: Микола Федосович Селівон) is a Ukrainian jurist, judge, diplomat and former chairman of the Constitutional Court of Ukraine.

Selivon is from Chernihiv Oblast. His working career he started as a techinicain at a military unit stationed in Chernihiv. During that time he also served his obligatory military duty. In 1968 Selivon enrolled at the Kiev University. In 1973 he graduated the Kiev University Law Faculty and after a brief internship-like training at the NANU Institute of State and Law, until 1979 worked as a junior researcher at the institute.

In 1979–1996 Selivan worked at the legal department of the Office of Minister of the Council of Ministers.

In 1996–2005 he was a judge of the Constitutional Court of Ukraine. In 2005 at the presidential inauguration Selivon was administering an oath from the President of Ukraine Viktor Yushchenko.

In 2005–2006 as a professor he was lecturing at the National Academy for Public Administration. In 2006–2010 he served as the ambassador of Ukraine to Kazakhstan.

Legal offices
Preceded by Viktor Skomorokha	Chairman of the Constitutional Court of Ukraine; 2002–2005	Succeeded by Ivan Dombrovskyi
