= Imperative mandate (Ukraine) =

Ukrainian prohibition of changing parties during a parliamentary term

Imperative mandate (Ukrainian: Імперативний мандат) commonly refers to a provision in the Constitution of Ukraine in which members of the Verkhovna Rada (Ukrainian parliament) are bound by the constitution and laws of Ukraine to remain members of the parliamentary faction or bloc in which they were elected. Imperative mandate provisions were defined in the Constitution in articles Articles 78 and 81.

== History ==
The provision was introduced in the Constitution during the 2004 Constitutional Amendments on December 8, 2004.

During the 2006 Ukrainian political crisis, President Viktor Yushchenko applied the provision while dissolving the parliament in April 2007 after members of the opposition crossed party lines to join the Alliance of National Unity to undermine his authority and reach a 300-MP constitutional majority.

On October 1, 2010, the Constitutional Court of Ukraine overturned the 2004 Constitutional Amendments, considering them unconstitutional. Several individual joined other factions already on October 5, 2010. But the Verkhovna Rada canceled the law's provision after amending the regulations of its activities on October 8, 2010; since then only 15 or more deputies can form a parliamentary faction, a lawmaker can join only one faction (the chairman and his two assistants cannot head factions of deputies) and deputies who are expelled from factions or decide to leave them become individual lawmakers; individual deputies are allowed to unite into parliamentary groups of people's deputies then again at least 15 deputies are required for the formation of such groups.

=== 2014 reinstatement ===
On 21 February 2014, the parliament passed a law that reinstated the December 8, 2004 amendments of the constitution. This was passed under simplified procedure without any decision of the relevant committee and was passed in the first and the second reading in one voting by 386 deputies. The law was approved by 140 MPs of the Party of Regions, 89 MPs of Batkivshchyna, 40 MPs of UDAR, 32 of the Communist Party, and 50 independent lawmakers.

Petro Poroshenko Bloc MPs Mykola Tomenko and Yehor Firsov parliamentary mandates were terminated (due to a decision by the Petro Poroshenko Bloc party congress) by the provision in March 2016.

In practice the imperative mandate causes the deprivation of the mandate of deputies who leave their faction by their own initiative while deputies who are removed from their faction become an independent MP.

In June 2020, after parliament had refused his request to release him from parliament, Svyatoslav Vakarchuk left his party's (Voice) faction and he and his party terminated his parliamentary mandate through the imperative mandate.

== Criticism ==
The imperative mandate provisions had been the subject of criticism by the Parliamentary Assembly of the Council of Europe as being undemocratic till its end. In the Assembly's 2007 report on the Parliamentary Assembly of the Council of Europe — Resolution 1549 (2007) Functioning of democratic institutions in Ukraine ^{(items 8 and 9)} it wrote:

The Assembly calls on the political forces of Ukraine, as a matter of urgency, to resume working on the improvement of the Constitution of Ukraine and the related legislation in order to establish at last an effective system of checks and balances and bring constitutional provisions in line with European standards. Constitutional reform should be part of the discussions aimed at the resolution of the current political crisis. The Assembly expresses its expectation that the Venice Commission will be actively involved in the process of drafting constitutional reform proposals. The Assembly reaffirms that the recall of people's representatives by the political parties ("imperative mandate") is unacceptable in a democratic state. The relevant constitutional provisions need to be abrogated in line with the recommendations of the Venice Commission in 2004; similar provisions also need to be deleted from ordinary legislation. The Assembly believes that a consistent political programme, responsible and committed party membership and scrupulous screening of parties' candidates are more effective tools for encouraging party and faction discipline.

== See also ==
- The Anti-defection law in India, a similar concept
- Imperative mandate (generalized)
- Party switching
- Elections in Ukraine
