= Second Yanukovych government =

Government of Ukraine

Second Yanukovych Government
- 12th Cabinet of Ukraine (since 1990)

- Date formed: 4 August 2006
- Date dissolved: 18 December 2007

People and organisations
- Head of state: Viktor Yushchenko
- Head of government: Viktor Yanukovych
- Deputy head of government: Mykola Azarov
- No. of ministers: 26
- Member party: Party of Regions; Communist Party of Ukraine; Socialist Party of Ukraine
- Status in legislature: Coalition of National Unity
- Opposition party: Yulia Tymoshenko Bloc; NUNS
- Opposition leader: Yulia Tymoshenko

History
- Legislature term: 5 years
- Predecessor: Yekhanurov government
- Successor: Second Tymoshenko government

The Second Yanukovych Government was a governing coalition of the Party of Regions, the Communist Party and the Socialist Party in Ukraine after the 2006 Ukrainian parliamentary election and the 2006 Ukrainian political crisis. Until 24 March 2007, it was known as the Anti-Crisis Alliance (Ukrainian: Антикризова коаліція).

== History ==
Initially the Our Ukraine Bloc intended to join the coalition and five of its ministers were initially appointed into Cabinet of Ministers of the coalition; Justice Minister Roman Zvarych, Family and Sports Minister Yuriy Pavlenko, Emergency Situations Minister Viktor Baloha, Culture Minister Ihor Likhovyy, and Health Minister Yuriy Polyachenko. By November 2006 these five ministers were dismissed by parliament or withdrawn by Our Ukraine Bloc.

Before the crisis which sparked the 2007 parliamentary election, the coalition consisted of the following 249 members of parliamentary parties:

- Party of Regions (186)
- Socialist Party of Ukraine (31)
- Communist Party of Ukraine (21)
- Yulia Tymoshenko Electoral Bloc (6)
- Our Ukraine Bloc (5)

At its highest point the Alliance consisted of 260 members, and the trend was that opposition members were willing to join the Alliance, and thereby undermine the authority of the President and move towards the 300-member constitutional majority.

On 6 April 2007 the coalition's members count was reduced to 238 members:

- Party of Regions (186)
- Socialist Party of Ukraine (31)
- Communist Party of Ukraine (21)

=== Fall of cabinet ===
President of Ukraine Yushchenko dissolved parliament on 2 April 2007 because he believed the government was acting illegally during the 2007 Ukrainian political crisis. Yushchenko argued that the constitution only allows whole parliamentary blocs to change sides, not individuals deputies. Yushchenko, Yanukovych and parliamentary speaker Oleksandr Moroz agreed in late May 2007 that the election would be held on 30 September, provided that at least 150 opposition and pro-president MPs formally gave up their seats, thereby creating the legal grounds for dissolving parliament. This happened.

== Creation ==
Faction	Number of deputies	For	Against	Abstained	Didn't vote	Absent
Party of Regions Faction	186	179	0	2	4	1
Yulia Tymoshenko Bloc	129	5	0	0	0	124
Our Ukraine–People's Self-Defense Bloc	80	34	0	0	6	40
Socialist Party of Ukraine	33	30	1	0	0	2
Communist Party of Ukraine	21	21	0	0	0	0
All factions	449	269	1	2	10	167

== Composition ==
The Cabinet of Ministers of Ukraine of the Alliance of National Unity was appointed on August 4, 2006; it served until the twelfth Cabinet and Second Tymoshenko Government was chosen on December 18, 2007. Its composition was:

- Prime Minister — Viktor Yanukovych (Party of Regions)
- First Vice Prime Minister, Finance Minister — Mykola Azarov (Party of Regions)
- Vice Prime Minister in affairs of Building, Architecture and Housing and Communal Services — Volodymyr Rybak
- Vice Prime Minister — Andriy Klyuyev (Party of Regions)
- Vice Prime Minister — Dmytro Tabachnyk (Party of Regions)
- Vice Prime Minister — Viktor Slauta
- Vice Prime Minister — Volodymyr Radchenko (January 12 — May 25, 2007) replaced with Oleksandr Kuzmuk
- Minister of Internal Affairs — Vasyl Tsushko (Socialist Party of Ukraine)
- Minister for Foreign Affairs — Borys Tarasyuk (dismissed on December 1, 2006) replaced with Arseniy Yatsenyuk
- Minister of Coal Mining Industry — Serhiy Tulub (Party of Regions)
- Minister of Culture — Yuriy Bohutsky
- Minister of Defense — Anatoliy Hrytsenko
- Minister of Economy — Volodymyr Makukha replaced with Anatoliy Kinakh (Industrials and Entrepreneurs)
- Minister of Education and Science — Stanislav Nikolaenko
- Fuel and Energy Minister — Yuriy Boyko
- Minister of Labor and Social Policy — Mykhailo Papiev
- Health Minister — Yuriy Polyachenko
- Minister of Agro-Industrial Complex — Yuriy Melnyk (Ukrainian People's Party)
- Minister of Industrial Policy — Anatoliy Holovko
- Minister of Environmental Protection — Vasyl Dzharty
- Minister of Transport and Communications — Mykola Rudkovsky
- Minister of Emergencies — Nestor Shufrych
- Minister for Family, Youth and Sport — Viktor Korzh
- Minister of Justice — Oleksandr Lavrynovych
- Minister in connections with Verkhovna Rada and other state authorities — Ivan Tkalenko
- Minister of the Cabinet of Ministers — Anatoliy Tolstoukhov
