= Dmytro Vydrin =

Russian-Ukrainian politician (born 1949)

- Дмитро Видрін
- Vydrin in 2014.

People's Deputy of Ukraine
- In office 25 May 2006 – 23 November 2007
- Constituency: Yulia Tymoshenko Bloc, No. 92 (party list)

Adviser to the President Leonid Kuchma (on domestic issues)
- In office 1994–1996

Deputy Secretary of the National Security and Defence Council of Ukraine
- In office March 2009 – December 2010
- President: Viktor Yushchenko

Personal details
- Born: Dmytro Hnatovych Vydrin; 25 May 1949 (age 77) Nazran, Russian SFSR, Soviet Union
- Party: Communist Party of the Soviet Union (until 1991); Party of Free Democrats (2002-2006, 2007); Yulia Tymoshenko Bloc (2006-2007)
- Education: Taras Shevchenko National University of Kyiv (1972); Institute of Philosophy of the National Academy of Sciences of the Ukrainian SSR (1982)

Dmytro Hnatovych Vydrin (Ukrainian: Дмитро Гнатович Видрін; Russian: Дмитрий Игнатьевич Выдрин; born 25 May 1949) is a Russian and formerly Ukrainian politician, teacher, and political theorist who served as a People's Deputy of Ukraine in the Verkhovna Rada from 2006 to 2007 with the Yulia Tymoshenko Bloc. He was also a longtime policy adviser, having served as an adviser to Leonid Kuchma, Pavlo Lazarenko, Anatoliy Kinakh, and Viktor Yanukovych. In addition, he headed multiple national institutes within Ukraine.

In 2014, after the success of Euromaidan, he disappeared and fled to Russian-occupied Crimea. Afterwards, he would express increasingly pro-Russian views, especially after the 2022 Russian invasion of Ukraine, and was sanctioned by Ukraine itself in 2023.

== Early life and teaching career ==
Vydrin was born on 25 May 1949 in the town of Nazran, which was then part of the Russian SFSR of the Soviet Union. He is ethnically Ukrainian and the son of Hnat Dmytrovych and Valentyna Hryhorivna. After finishing secondary school, he moved to the Ukrainian SSR in 1967 to attend the Taras Shevchenko University of Kyiv, which he graduated from in 1972 within the Faculty of Philosophy with the specialisation of a teacher of philosophy and social studies. Afterwards, Vydrin worked as an engineer at the Social Psychology Laboratory of the Institute of Cybernetics within the Academy of Sciences of the Ukrainian SSR until September 1973. He then moved to become a correspondent for the newspaper Komsomolskoye Znamaya, which was based in Kyiv, a position he held up until 1977. Vydrin then returned to do graduate studies, and in 1982 defended his dissertation for the title of Candidate of Sciences at the Institute of Philosophy of the National Academy of Sciences of the Ukrainian SSR. His thesis was about methodological aspects of the theory of quality of life. Shortly before and after graduation, he then worked as a researcher at his alma mater until 1987. He was then appointed Head of the Department of Political Sciences of the Higher Party School at the Central Committee of the Communist Party of Ukraine. Vydrin remained here up until the collapse of the Soviet Union in 1991. After its collapse, he became Director of the National Institute for Global and Regional Security.

== Political career ==
=== 1990s: Under Kuchma ===
In October 1994, Vydrin was reappointed as the adviser to then-president Leonid Kuchma, on internal/domestic affairs. He had earlier been an adviser to former president Leonid Kravchuk's election campaign team during the 1991 Ukrainian presidential elections. While an adviser, he published the book "Ukraine on the Threshold of the XXI Century: Political Aspect", together with Dmytro Tabachnyk. In this book, the two opined that no parliamentary group really wanted reform, because the existing middle class only cared about the wealth they had procured from the privatisation era. They also said that Kuchma's victory in 1994 reflected industrial capital because there the parties were weak at the time with no important or grand political figures to rise up alongside a greatly corrupt state. Kravchuk was said to be the ideologue with Kuchma as the manager and leader, but that he had no true ideology, although they said Kravchuk's push for independence in 1991 cost Ukraine. In terms of foreign policy, they argue for Eurasian integration, or "Eurasianism", away from integration with the European Union or the Baltics. They argue for Ukraine being a competitor to Russia in the Commonwealth of Independent States, and although they argue for normalisation with Russia, they also reject more hardline pro-Russian relations, as they said that Russia still considered Ukraine a vassal state and as lesser. However, Taras Kuzio in his review of the book said that the Eurasianism they advocated for was extremely unrealistic, given that Russia would never allow Ukraine to compete by its side or provide equal partnership.

Vydrin was eventually pushed out of the office by Tabachnyk himself, as Vydrin disagreed with his style of managing the administration and the system of information being conveyed. Vydrin was not the only person to be pushed out of Kuchma's circle during this time, as Oleksandr Razumkov (the father of Dmytro Razumkov) and Viktor Nebozhenko were too. After Vydrin lost his position in 1996, he became co-chairman of the Southern Ukrainian Economic Union from 1997 to 1998 and President of the European Institute for Integration and Development, and then was president of the media corporation Vedomosti from 2000 to 2001. Over the next few years, Vydrin would occasionally comment on politics, giving his opinion during the 1999 Ukrainian presidential election that Oleksandr Tkachenko, although seen at the time as a pro-Slav politician, would quickly change his politics and advocate for NATO if need be. He also said that Yevhen Marchuk, although seen at the time as pro-Western and anti-Kuchma, would also change positions if given Russian oil and gas, and that he would turn towards Russia. Marchuk would indeed afterwards become a pro-Kuchma spokesman after he was offered the post of Secretary of the National Security and Defense Council of Ukraine after Marchuk lost the race in 1999.

=== 2000s: Adviser and Verkhovna Rada ===
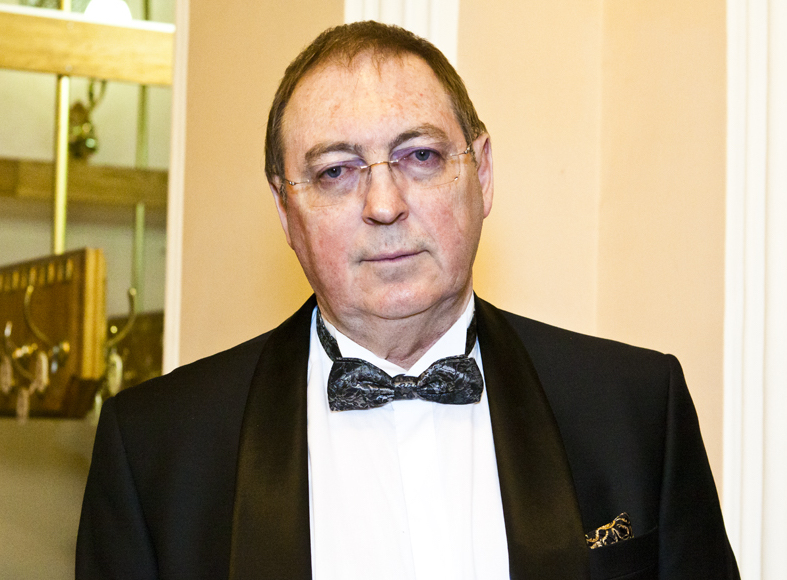
Vydrin in 2011.

In early July 2001, Vydrin regained power as the adviser to then Prime Minister Anatoliy Kinakh, on a voluntary basis. During this time, he made multiple trips, including to Donetsk, where he claimed that Donetsk was the only region with a regional elite (despite the existing Kyiv Seven and Dnipropetrovsk Clan), and said the Donetsk Clan was formed contrary to political science laws he had presented earlier. At that time, he was a founding member of Party of Free Democrats ("Yabluko") with Mykhailo Brodskyy and was considered its ideologist. Vydrin was eventually dismissed again in November 2002 when Kinakh was also dismissed and Viktor Yanukovych became Prime Minister. Prior to this he had tried to run for a seat in the 2002 Ukrainian parliamentary election with the party list of Yabluko, but Yabluko did not win enough of the percentage to do so. After this, he once again returned to heading the Director of the European Institute for Integration and Development and giving his opinions to some outlets. Contrary to his previous opinions, during the 2004 Ukrainian presidential elections, Vydrin said that a repeat vote for the second round needed to happen and that Ukraine should listen to the opinions of the European Union, and afterwards said that Viktor Yushchenko would likely become president with Yanukovych being pushed to political shadows (this would not happen).

Eventually, Vydrin tried to regain power during the 2006 Ukrainian parliamentary elections by entering through the Yulia Tymoshenko Bloc. He was placed No. 92 on the list, and was thus successfully elected. During the brief 5th convocation, he was appointed Chairman of the Subcommittee on Global Security and Sustainable Development of the Committee on Foreign Affairs. At the time, he positioned himself as a strong opponent of the Party of Regions, and advocated for using law enforcement measures to unblock the party from occupying the rostrum. However, the 5th convocation was dissolved early inn 2007, leading to the snap 2007 Ukrainian parliamentary elections. After defecting back to Yabluko, he was placed No. 4 on their party list to the elections, which wasn't enough for him to get a seat. On 27 March 2009, Yushchenko appointed Vydrin as Deputy Secretary of the National Security and Defense Council of Ukraine. As deputy Secretary, he provided the Russian outlet RIA Novosti with a taped recording of what he said was Yulia Tymoshenko and Georgian president Mikheil Saakashvili, in which Tymoshenko promised him that she would provide all possible assistance to grant official status to Georgian observors of the CEC in the upcoming 2010 Ukrainian presidential elections. He was dismissed again in December 2010.

=== 2010s: Under Yanukovych ===
By fall of 2011, Vydrin was made an adviser to President Viktor Yanukovych, which Ukrainska Pravda called confusing given his previous statements against Yanukovych when he was with the BYuT. He had previously, in April, during Yanukovych's presidential speech, said he was "satisfied" with it and that Yanukovych had taken his proposals for the development of democracy through the use of referendums. Vydrin was eventually dismissed in February 2014

=== Defection to Russia and hardline pro-Russian turn ===
During the initial Euromaidan protests, Vydrin expressed his Anti-Maidan views and said that oligarchs were allegedly backing the protests and that it was a "revolt of oligarchs". After they succeeded, he disappeared from politics for some time. It was later confirmed that he had fled to Crimea, which had been de facto part of Russia since the 2014 Russian annexation of Crimea, and it was said he took up Russian citizenship. By February 2016, it was confirmed through records that he owned a tourism enterprise known as "Chinese House" in Yalta, Crimea, and was co-owner of "Korona Graminia" in Sevastopol. He confirmed this in a call to Glavcom, saying he would explain his businesses to the United States and China. He started reappearing in politics around 2018, when he presented his book "The Golden Needle, or the Eighth Dan of Vladimir Putin" in Moscow. In the book, he opined that Putin had no equal in scale in terms of personality, and that he thought Putin was an officer who did not care about sanctions brought on by the 2014 annexation. In response, an op-ed in Ukrinform, a Ukrainian news outlet, called the book an all-out flattery aimed at Putin's circle. In 2020, he said that he could not see Ukraine having any future as a unified nation, with no figure or book shared by eastern and western Ukraine.

After the 2022 Russian invasion of Ukraine, Vydrin supported the invasion, saying Ukraine was cultivating a cult of simple consumption and destroying its own industry by becoming an agrarian superpower. He also said that Volodymyr Zelenskyy was trying to remove any rivals and that the West had control over Ukrainian nationalism, which they were trying to use to destroy Russia. In a later interview, he said Ukraine had been "poisoned" by hatred, and said that the country could not win and that NATO would be "pushed back to its 1990s borders". He also proposed to split Ukraine into two enclaves like with North and South Korea to change the "counsciousness". By 2023, Glavcom called him a "staunch Putin supporter". The following year, in April 2024, he said Ukraine was a feudal system of oligarch fortresses and called the country an "imitation". Vydrin also said that he was "in his soul" Russian, and that he had always sided with the Russians, joining Kuchma's camp when it was pro-Russian and leaving Kravchuk's when it was anti-Russian. He also said it was most likely that Ukraine would be digested by Russia, and that Europeans would embrace Russians afterwards.

== Personal life ==
He is married to Nadezhda Hryhorivna. Together, they have two children: Elena, born in 1982, and Alexei, born in 1986.

=== Legal issues ===
In 2022, the volunteer initiatives "How Not to Become a Vegetable" and "YouControl" formed a database of people they deemed Russian propagandists or people who supported the Russian invasion. Vydrin was one of the few who were included from Ukraine. In January 2023, Zelenskyy signed Decree No. 23/2023 into force, which enacted personal sanctions for people who supported Russia, based off the decision of the National Security and Defense Council of Ukraine. Vydrin was included on this list.
