= Ivan Tymchenko =

Ukrainian jurist (1939–2020)

- Іван Тимченко

Chairman of the Constitutional Court of Ukraine
- In office 19 October 1996 – 18 October 1999
- Nominated by: Congress of Judges
- President: Leonid Kuchma
- Preceded by: Leonid Yuzkov
- Succeeded by: Viktor Skomorokha

Personal details
- Born: March 3, 1939 Kalynivka, Pokrovske Raion, Ukrainian SSR
- Died: August 12, 2020 (aged 81)
- Occupation: Jurist

Ivan Artemovych Tymchenko (Ukrainian: Іва́н Арте́мович Ти́мченко; 3 March 1939 – 12 August 2020) was a Ukrainian jurist, chairman of the Constitutional Court between 1996 and 1999.

On 1967, Tymchenko graduated from the Laws Faculty of the Taras Shevchenko National University of Kyiv.

In September 1996, President of Ukraine appointed him as magistrate of the Constitutional Court and one month later, on 19 October, became its chairman until 18 October 1999. He died on 12 August 2020.

Legal offices
| Preceded by Leonid Yuzkov | Chairman of the Constitutional Court of Ukraine; 1996–1999 | Succeeded by Viktor Skomorokha |
