= Oleksandr Lavrynovych =

Ukrainian politician (born 1956)

- Олександр Лавринович
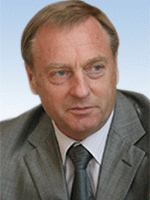
- Official portrait, 2012

Supreme Council of Justice Chairperson
- In office 2 July 2013 – 10 April 2014
- Preceded by: Volodymyr Kolechnychenko
- Succeeded by: Ihor Benedysyuk

12th Minister of Justice of Ukraine
- In office 11 March 2010 – 2 July 2013
- Prime Minister: Mykola Azarov
- Preceded by: Mykola Onishchuk
- Succeeded by: Olena Lukash
- In office 11 January 2006 – 18 December 2007
- Preceded by: Roman Zvarych
- Succeeded by: Mykola Onishchuk
- In office 21 November 2002 – 5 January 2005
- Prime Minister: Anatoliy Kinakh; Viktor Yanukovych
- Preceded by: Syuzanna Stanik
- Succeeded by: Roman Zvarych

Acting Chairman of the Verkhovna Rada
- In office 12 November 2008 – 9 December 2008
- President: Viktor Yushchenko
- Preceded by: Arseniy Yatsenyuk
- Succeeded by: Volodymyr Lytvyn

First Deputy Chairman of the Verkhovna Rada
- In office 2 September 2008 – 11 March 2010
- Preceded by: Adam Martynyuk
- Succeeded by: Adam Martynyuk

Member of the Verkhovna Rada
- In office 12 December 2012 – 25 December 2012
- Constituency: People's Movement of Ukraine, Lviv Oblast, District No.274
- In office 23 November 2007 – 11 March 2010
- In office 11 May 1994 – 18 October 2001

Personal details
- Born: June 28, 1956 (age 70) Ovruch, Zhytomyr Oblast, Ukrainian SSR (now Ukraine)
- Party: Party of Regions (since 2007)
- Other political affiliations: People's Movement of Ukraine
- Spouse: Svitlana Hryhorivna (b. 1956)
- Children: Maksym (b. 1978), Vitaliy (b. 1983)
- Education: Kyiv University (1978); Kyiv Polytechnic Institute (1987); Yaroslav the Wise Law Academy (1998); Institute of State and Law (2001)
- Occupation: Pensioner

Oleksandr Volodymyrovych Lavrynovych (Ukrainian: Олександр Володимирович Лавринович; born 28 June 1956) is a Ukrainian physicist, lawyer, politician, former member of the Supreme Council of Justice of Ukraine, a former Ukrainian member of Parliament, and former Minister of Justice of Ukraine. He is a Merited Jurist of Ukraine (2003). He was one of the founders of the first democratic party in Ukraine in 1989 – People's Movement of Ukraine and considered to be one of the "fathers" of the independence of Ukraine from the Soviet Union.

== Early life and education ==
Oleksandr Volodymyrovych Lavrynovych was born on 28 June 1956.

He graduated from the Taras Shevchenko National University in 1978.

== Career ==
Lavrynovych worked in the NAN Ukrainian SSR. In 1981–1984, he served in military (chief of radar station). From 1989 till 1998, Lavrynovych was one of the leaders of People's Movement of Ukraine. From 1990 till 1994, he was a member of the Central Election Commission of Ukraine and its First Deputy Chairman in 1991–1994.

From 1998 till 2001, he was a People's Deputy of Ukraine for People's Movement of Ukraine parliamentary faction, surrendering his deputy mandate early. In 2002, Lavrynovych was elected to parliament on the Our Ukraine party list, but refused to be registered. In May 2002, Lavrynovych was appointed as Justice Minister in the Kinakh Government. In the First Yanukovych Government (2002–2005) he was also Minister of Justice of Ukraine. After a short intermezzo as Deputy Chairman of the Board of "Ukrnafta" (2005–2006) Lavrynovych returned to national politics in August 2006 as First Deputy Minister of the Cabinet of Ministers of Ukraine in the Second Yanukovych Government. But he soon moved to the post Minister of Justice of Ukraine again (from 1 November 2006 till 18 December 2007). In the 2007 parliamentary election he was elected Deputy of Ukraine for Party of Regions. From the dismissal of Arseniy Yatsenyuk till the election of Volodymyr Lytvyn as Chairman of the Verkhovna Rada, Oleksandr Lavrynovych assumed the position as acting chairman from November 12, 2008 till December 9, 2008. The Verkhovna Rada refused to include in its agenda an issue concerning dismissal of its first Vice Speaker Lavrynovych on November 17, 2009. Starting 11 March 2010, Lavrynovych became Justice Minister again. On 2 July, he was elected as member of the Supreme Council of Justice of Ukraine. Olena Lukash replaced Lavrynovych as Justice Minister 2 days later. On April 10, 2014, Oleksandr Lavrynovych resigned from his position with Supreme Council of Justice. Since that time he is acting as legal expert and holds the position with the Board of Institute for Legal Society, a Non-governmental organization.

On 13 July 2015, the Ukrainian Prosecutor General's Office announced that Lavrynovych was suspected of embezzling public funds worth more than 8.5 million Hryvnia. It said these funds were used to finance American law firm Skadden, Arps, Slate, Meagher & Flom, that helped to win the court case in the European Court of Human Rights by the State of Ukraine and at the same time "to conceal evidence of criminal violations of the law by Ukrainian state law enforcement agencies and the courts" during the 2011 trial of Yulia Tymoshenko.

In March 2016, Ukrainian court released Lavrynovych from any restrictions of Prosecutor's office.

== Awards ==
- Order of Prince Yaroslav the Wise (5th degree)
- Order of Merit (2nd degree)
- Order of Merit (3rd degree), for active participation in organizing and conducting the 1991 Ukrainian independence referendum

Political offices
| Preceded by Syuzanna Stanik | Minister of Justice of Ukraine; 2002–2005 | Succeeded by Roman Zvarych |
| Preceded by Roman Zvarych | Minister of Justice of Ukraine; 2006–2007 | Succeeded by Mykola Onischuk |
| Preceded by Arseniy Yatsenyuk | Acting Chairman of the Verkhovna Rada; 2008 | Succeeded by Volodymyr Lytvyn |
| Preceded by Mykola Onishchuk | Minister of Justice of Ukraine; 2010–2013 | Succeeded by Olena Lukash |
