= Roman Zvarych =

Ukrainian politician

- Роман Зварич
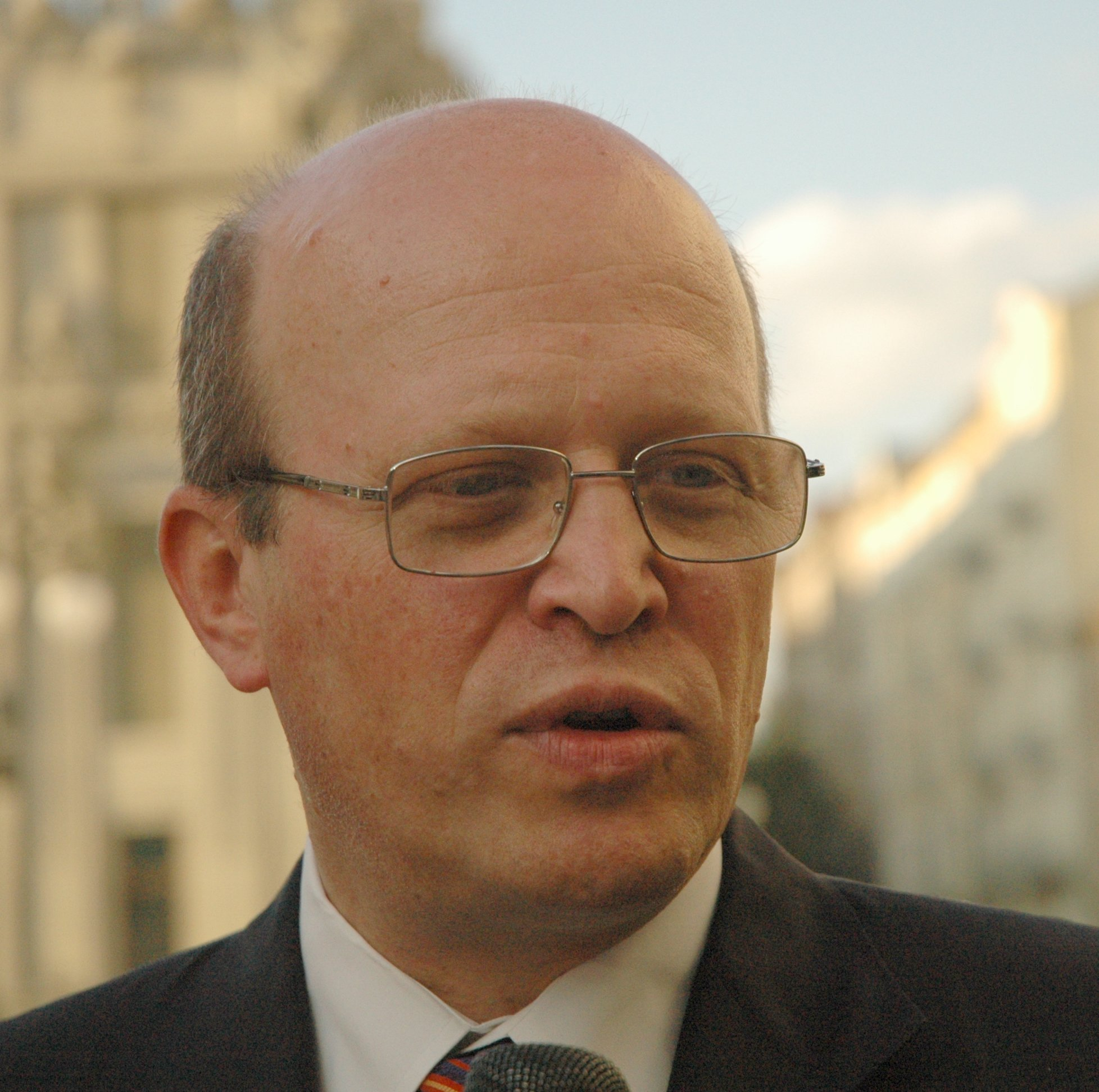
- Zvarych in 2006

7th and 9th Minister of Justice of Ukraine
- In office 4 August 2006 – 1 November 2006
- President: Viktor Yushchenko
- Prime Minister: Viktor Yanukovych
- Preceded by: Serhiy Holovatyi
- Succeeded by: Oleksandr Lavrynovych
- In office 4 February 2005 – 27 September 2005
- President: Viktor Yushchenko
- Prime Minister: Yulia Tymoshenko
- Preceded by: Oleksandr Lavrynovych
- Succeeded by: Serhiy Holovatyi

People's Deputy of Ukraine
- In office 15 March 2018 – 29 August 2019
- Constituency: Petro Poroshenko Bloc, No. 82
- In office 23 November 2007 – 12 December 2012
- Constituency: Our Ukraine, No. 36
- In office 15 May 2006 – 14 September 2006
- Constituency: Our Ukraine Bloc, No. 26
- In office 29 March 1998 – 3 March 2005
- Constituency: People's Movement of Ukraine, No. 24 (1998–2002); Our Ukraine Bloc, No. 90 (2002–2005)

Personal details
- Born: 20 November 1953 (age 72) Yonkers, New York, United States
- Party: Congress of Ukrainian Nationalists
- Other political affiliations: People's Movement of Ukraine; Our Ukraine–People's Self-Defense Bloc; Our Ukraine; Petro Poroshenko Bloc

Roman Mykhailovych Zvarych (Ukrainian: Роман Михайлович Зварич; born 20 November 1953) is a Ukrainian politician. A former United States citizen, he was one of the first people to relinquish that citizenship in order to take up Ukrainian citizenship after the dissolution of the Soviet Union.

== Early life ==
Zvarych was born in Yonkers, New York to Soviet émigré parents who came to the United States during World War II. In later interviews, he says that at age fifteen he swore an oath to "achieve Ukrainian statehood or ... die fighting for it". In 1976 he earned a B.A. with honors from Manhattan College in Bronx, New York.

== Emigration to Ukraine and political career ==
Zvarych moved to Ukraine in 1991 with the intention of pursuing an academic career, but soon after became involved in politics. In 1992, he and Slava Stetsko founded the Congress of Ukrainian Nationalists, a right-wing party. He renounced his U.S. citizenship in 1995. Along with fellow politician Ivan Lozowy this made him one of the first former Americans to renounce U.S. citizenship in favour of Ukrainian citizenship. A notification confirming his loss of citizenship appeared in the Federal Register in June 1997 with his name listed as "Roman Mychajlo Zwarycz".

Zwarych ran in the 1994 election for a single-mandate seat representing a district of Kyiv in the Verkhovna Rada, and received 70% of the vote but was not elected due to his failure to meet the voter turnout threshold of 50% mandated by the electoral law at the time. He was eventually elected in the 1998 election from a party-list proportional seat. Thereafter he sat in the Verkhovna Rada for six years, serving on various committees including the Committee on Legal Reform and the Committee on European Integration. Outside of the Verkhovna Rada he also moonlighted as a lawyer; Ukrainian courts had no requirement for practitioners of law to hold certifications or pass a bar examination. On one occasion Zvarych successfully defended a family against eviction. More importantly, during the Orange Revolution in the midst of the 2004 presidential election, he successfully argued a case on behalf of Viktor Yushchenko to prevent the creation of Ukrainian voting districts for Ukrainians in Russia.

In the spring of 2005, Ukrainian Pravda published an article alleging that the minister had not been a professor at Columbia University, had not authored scientific papers, and did not receive a diploma from the university as was stated in his official biographies. Then in an exclusive interview with The Ukrainian Weekly Roman Zvarych admitted that he had not received a masters or a doctoral degree from Columbia University, nor had he attained the rank of professor at New York University. And unfortunately he had no formal legal education, either.

Columbia University confirmed that Roman Zvarych had not received a document of completion of higher education from them. Nor was the publication able to obtain confirmation from Manhattan College, where, according to Zvarych, he had received a bachelor’s degree. New York University spokesperson Josh Taylor told The Ukrainian Weekly that Zvarych had been "a part-time lecturer" in the School of Continuing and Professional Studies from 1989 to 1991, i.e., not for eight years but for two. Teaching evening continuing education classes is a very common way in New York for businessmen and other non-academic people to acquire an academic gloss.

As his basis for aspiring to the position of Ukraine's Justice Minister, Zvarych said that he had served as a deputy in the country's legislative assembly for 6 years, and that gave him "considerable legal expertise."

In the 2014 Ukrainian parliamentary election Zvarych was a candidate of Petro Poroshenko Bloc; placed 82nd on the electoral list. But the party only won 63 seats on the electoral list; hence he was not (re-)elected into parliament. He returned to the Verkovna Rada nevertheless on 15 March 2018 to take the place of Valery Pakzkan after the latter's election as head of the Accounting Chamber of Ukraine.
