= Viktor Skomorokha =

- Віктор Скомороха

Chairman of the Constitutional Court of Ukraine
- In office 19 October 1999 – 18 October 2000
- Nominated by: Congress of Judges
- President: Leonid Kuchma
- Preceded by: Ivan Tymchenko
- Succeeded by: Mykola Selivon

Personal details
- Born: February 7, 1941 (age 85) Matrosove, Solone Raion, Ukrainian SSR
- Education: Kharkiv Law Institute (1963-67); Yaroslav Mudryi National Law University (2001)
- Occupation: Jurist

Viktor Skomorokha (Ukrainian: Віктор Єгорович Скомороха) is a Ukrainian lawyer and former chairman of the Constitutional Court of Ukraine. He became better known for chairing the Constitutional Court when it lifted a ban of the Communist Party of Ukraine.

Skomorokha is from Dnipropetrovsk Oblast. His working career he started at the Zhovtneva Revolyutsiya (October Revolution) kolkhoz in village of Promin. After his obligatory military service Skomorokha enrolled to the Kharkiv Law Institute. He graduated Yaroslav Mudryi National Law University (Kharkiv Law Institute) in 1967 and after a brief internship-like training, until 1969 Skomorokha was a people's judge at the Krasnyi Luch city court.

In 1969 to 1976 Skomorokha worked as a judge at the Luhansk Oblast court. In 1976-1996 he was a judge of the Supreme Court of Ukraine (judicial college on criminal matters). In 1996-2005 he was a judge of the Constitutional Court of Ukraine. In 1999 at the presidential inauguration Skomorokha was administering an oath from the President of Ukraine Leonid Kuchma.

Legal offices
Preceded by Ivan Tymchenko	Chairman of the Constitutional Court of Ukraine; 1999–2002	Succeeded by Mykola Selivon
