= Zhanna Usenko-Chorna =

Ukrainian Lawyer

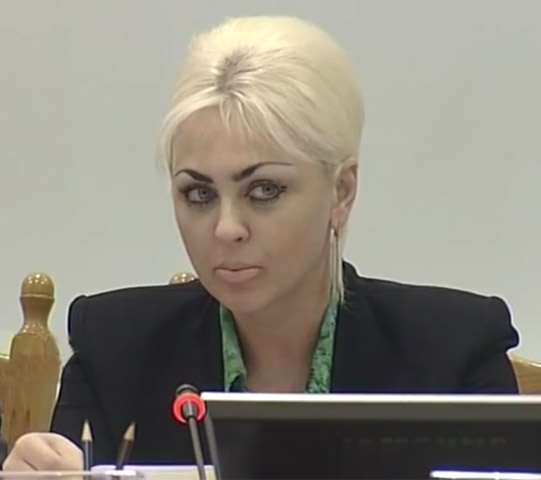
Zhanna Usenko-Chorna

Zhanna Ivanivna Usenko-Chorna (Ukrainian: Жанна Іванівна Усенко-Чорна; born May 1, 1973, in Kyiv) is a Ukrainian lawyer, Merited Jurist of Ukraine and former member and Deputy chairwoman of the Central Election Commission of Ukraine.

== Biography ==
Born May 1, 1973, in Kyiv. In 1997 graduated from Kyiv University with a degree in history and again in 2000 with a degree in international law.

In 1999 Usenko-Chorna was appointed principal consultant of the National Bureau for compliance with the European Convention on Human Rights of the Ministry of Justice of Ukraine. Since May 2000 she was appointed Senior Consultant of the Verkhovna Rada (Ukrainian parliament) on legal policy and adviser for the Presidential Administration of Ukraine and deputy head of the administration.

Since December 2004 a member of the Central Election Commission and from June 2007 Deputy Chairman of the Central Election Commission.

The Ukrainian parliament dismissed her and 12 other members of the Central Election Commission on 20 September 2018.
