= Andriy Stryzhak (judge) =

- Андрій Стрижак
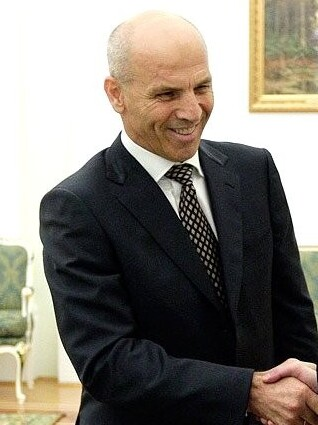

Chairman of the Constitutional Court of Ukraine
- In office 10 July 2007 – 12 July 2010
- President: Viktor Yushchenko; Viktor Yanukovych
- Preceded by: Valeriy Pshenychnyi (acting)
- Succeeded by: Anatoliy Holovin

Personal details
- Born: 21 November 1947 (age 78) Dubrivka, Uzhhorod Raion, Ukrainian SSR, Soviet Union
- Education: Kharkiv Law Institute (1967-71); Verkhovna Rada Institute of Legislation (2005)
- Occupation: Jurist, judge, investigator

Andriy Stryzhak (Ukrainian: Андрій Андрійович Стрижак; born 21 November 1947) is a Ukrainian lawyer, judge, investigator and former chairman of the Constitutional Court of Ukraine.

Stryzhak is from Zakarpattia Oblast. His working career he started at the Uzhhorod Autotransportation Company as a technician. After his obligatory military service, Stryzhak enrolled to the Kharkiv Law Institute. He graduated Yaroslav Mudryi National Law University (Kharkiv Law Institute) in 1971 and after half a year working as an investigator of the Ivanivka Raion persecution office (Odessa Oblast) until 1974 Stryzhak worked in the Uzhhorod city persecutor office. In 1974 to 1978 Stryzhak worked in the Zakarpattia Oblast persecutor office.

In 1978-1988 and 1996-2006 he was a judge of the Zakarpattia Oblast court, heading the court in 1996–2006. In 1988 to 1996 Stryzhak was a judge of the Supreme Court of Ukraine, heading judicial college on criminal matters. In 2006-2010 he was a judge of the Constitutional Court of Ukraine, chairing it since 2007. In 2010 at the presidential inauguration Stryzhak was administering an oath from the President of Ukraine Viktor Yanukovych. In 2010 he was relieved of his duties by reaching the age of retirement.

During his term as a judge of the Constitutional Court, Stryzhak's son Andriy (junior) was a deputy at the Zakarpattia Oblast regional council. Andriy (junior) was also involved in a car crash in Uzhhorod when he destroyed the Kakha Kaladze's Lamborghini in 2009.

Court offices
Preceded by Valeriy Pshenychnyi; Acting	Chairman of the Constitutional Court of Ukraine; 2007–2010	Succeeded by Anatoliy Holovin
