= Suzanna Stanik =

Ukrainian judge

- Сюзанна Станік
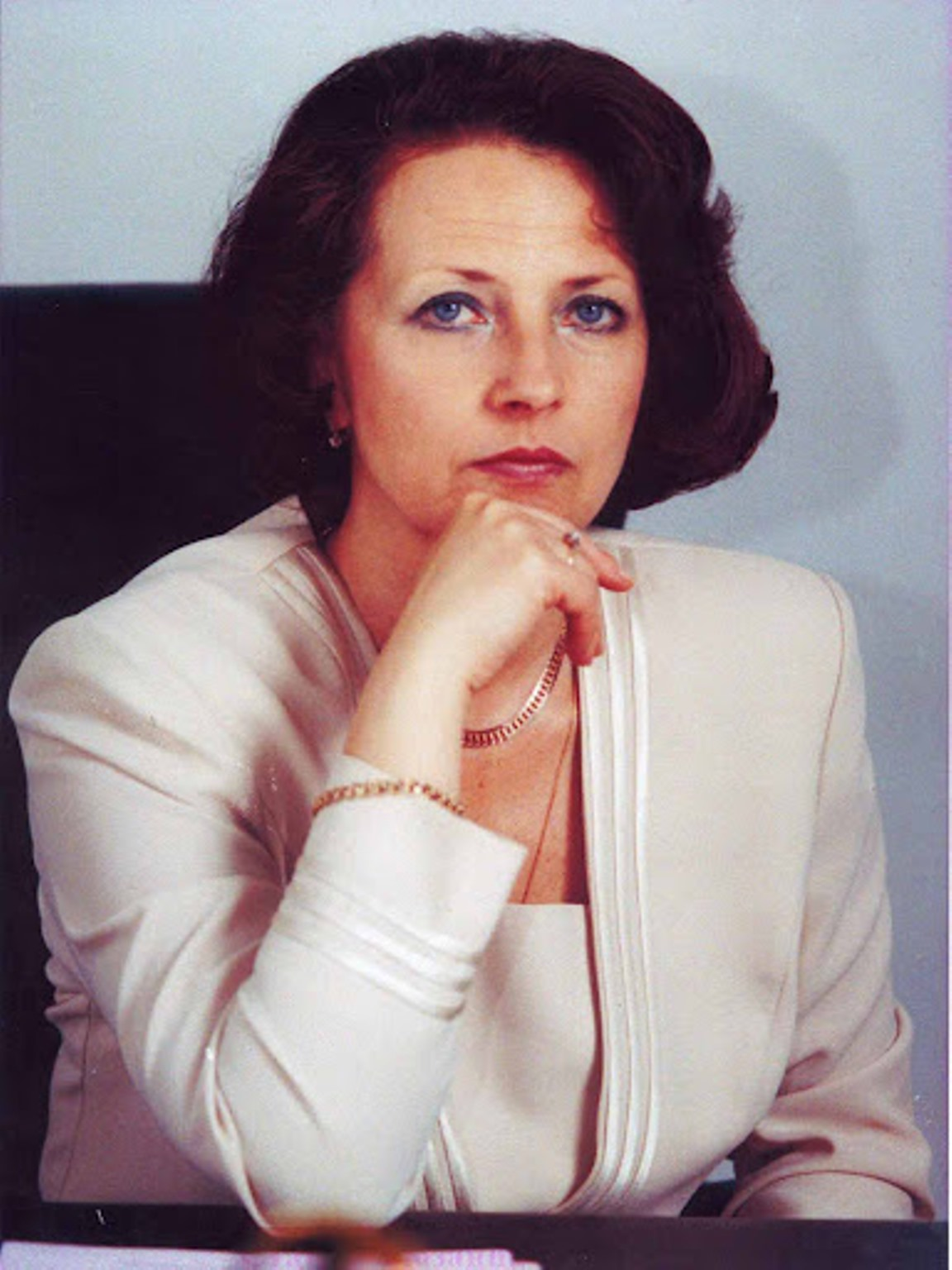
- Official portrait

Judge of the Constitutional Court of Ukraine
- In office 2004–2010

Minister of Justice
- In office 21 August 1997 – 21 November 2002
- Preceded by: Serhiy Holovatyi
- Succeeded by: Oleksandr Lavrynovych

Minister of Family, Youth and Sports
- In office September 1996 – 21 August 1997

Personal details
- Born: September 27, 1954 (age 72) Lviv, Ukraine, Soviet Union
- Occupation: Judge, lawyer and politician

Suzanna Romanivna Stanik (Ukrainian; Сюзанна Романівна Станік; born 27 September 1954) is Ukrainian judge, lawyer, and former politician, who last served as a judge on the Constitutional Court of Ukraine. from 2004 to 2010.

She also served as the Minister of Justice from 1997 to 2002, and was the Minister of Family, Youth and Sports from 1996 to 1997.

== Education ==
Stanik graduated from the Law Faculty of Lviv Ivan Franko State University with a Diploma cum laude in 1977. A decade later, she became a court participant at the Odessa Institute of Political Sciences and Sociology between 1988 and 1990.

== Career ==
In 1978, Stanik began to work, starting with a position in the executive bodies in Lviv and the Secretariat of the Cabinet of Ministers of Ukraine. In 1996, Stanik became a Minister of the Family and Youth Affairs of Ukraine. In 1997 she became the Minister of Justice. During this time, she also became a member of the Council of National Security and Defense. Between 1997 through 2004, she was the permanent representative of Ukraine to the UNICEF (United Nations Children's Fund).

In October 1998, Stanik was awarded an honorary title "People's Ambassador of Ukraine." That decision was made by the Board of the Ukrainian Charity Foundation. Since then, she was the permanent Representative of Ukraine at the Council of Europe, and was then awarded rank of Ambassador extraordinary and Plenipotentiary by the President of Ukraine.

In 2004, Stanik was appointed Judge of the Constitutional Court of Ukraine by the President and was elected Deputy Chairman of the Constitutional Court of Ukraine. In 2007, President Yushchenko of Ukraine attempted to remove three Constitutional Court Judges; one of them being Stanik. She left the court in 2010.
