= Ivan Dombrovskyy =

- Іван Домбровський

5th Chairman of the Constitutional Court of Ukraine
- In office 7 August 2006 – 17 May 2007
- Nominated by: Congress of Judges of Ukraine
- Preceded by: Mykola Selivon
- Succeeded by: Valeriy Pshenychnyy (acting)

Personal details
- Born: 7 March 1947 (age 79) Tsekhanivka, Podilsk Raion, Odesa Oblast

Ivan Petrovich Dombrovskyy (Ukrainian: Іван Петрович Домбровський, romanized: Ivan Petrovych Dombrovskyi; born 7 March 1947) is a Ukrainian jurist, notary, electro-welder, and a judge of Constitutional Court of Ukraine and Supreme Court of Ukraine.

He was a judge of the Constitutional Court of Ukraine since 4 August 2006 and its chairman since 19 September 2006. He was elected under the Congress of Judges' quota and is the oldest among the current judges of Constitutional Court. He resigned from the position of chairman of the Constitutional Court on 17 May 2007, and was replaced by Valeriy Pshenychnyy.

After Pshenychnyy was dismissed along with his deputy chairman Stanik, Dombrovskyy seems to have become acting chairman and the oldest judge in the court. He has presided on a few sessions prior to 10 July 2007 when the new chairman was elected.

== Footnotes ==
Legal offices
Preceded by Mykola Selivon	Chairman of the Constitutional Court of Ukraine; 2006–2007	Succeeded by Valeriy Pshenychnyy; Acting
