= Universal of National Unity =

2006 political declaration in Ukraine

The Universal of National Unity, also known as the Declaration of National Unity, (Ukrainian: Універсал Національної Єдності, translit.: Universal Natsional'noi Yednosti) is a declaration that was signed on August 3, 2006 by the President of Ukraine Viktor Yushchenko and leaders of the Ukrainian political parties represented in the parliament. It marked the resolution of the 2006 parliamentary crisis in Ukraine. The process of negotiating and signing of the Universal caused a major public discussion of Ukraine's domestic and foreign policy.
