= Mykhaylo Okhendovsky =

Ukrainian lawyer (born 1973)

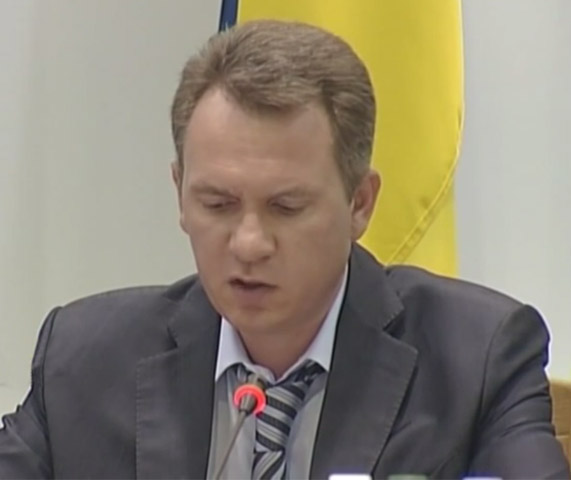
Mykhaylo Okhendovsky

Mykhaylo Okhendovsky (Ukrainian: Михайло Володимирович Охендовський; born 27 October 1973 in Dubăsari, in the Moldavian SSR) is a Ukrainian lawyer who was since 6 July 2013 Chairman of the Central Election Commission of Ukraine; until the Ukrainian parliament dismissed him on 20 September 2018.

== Biography ==
In 1997 Okhendovsky graduated with honors from the Institute of International Relations of Taras Shevchenko National University of Kyiv in "international law". From 1991 on he worked in various juridical functions, among others for the National Television Company of Ukraine.

In February 2004 Okhendovsky became a member of the Central Election Commission of Ukraine (CEC). On 1 June 2007 he was re-elected in the CEC under the quota of the Party of Regions in the Ukrainian parliament (the Verkhovna Rada). On 6 July 2013 he was elected Chairman of the Central Election Commission of Ukraine, he was the only candidate.

On 25 June 2010 Okhendovsky was awarded the title Merited Jurist of Ukraine.

In December 2016 Okhendovsky became a suspect accused of receiving illegal funds from "black cash" ledgers of the Party of Regions.

Parliament dismissed him and 12 other members of the Central Election Commission on 20 September 2018.
