= People's Deputy of Ukraine =

Member of the Verkhovna Rada (national parliament of Ukraine)

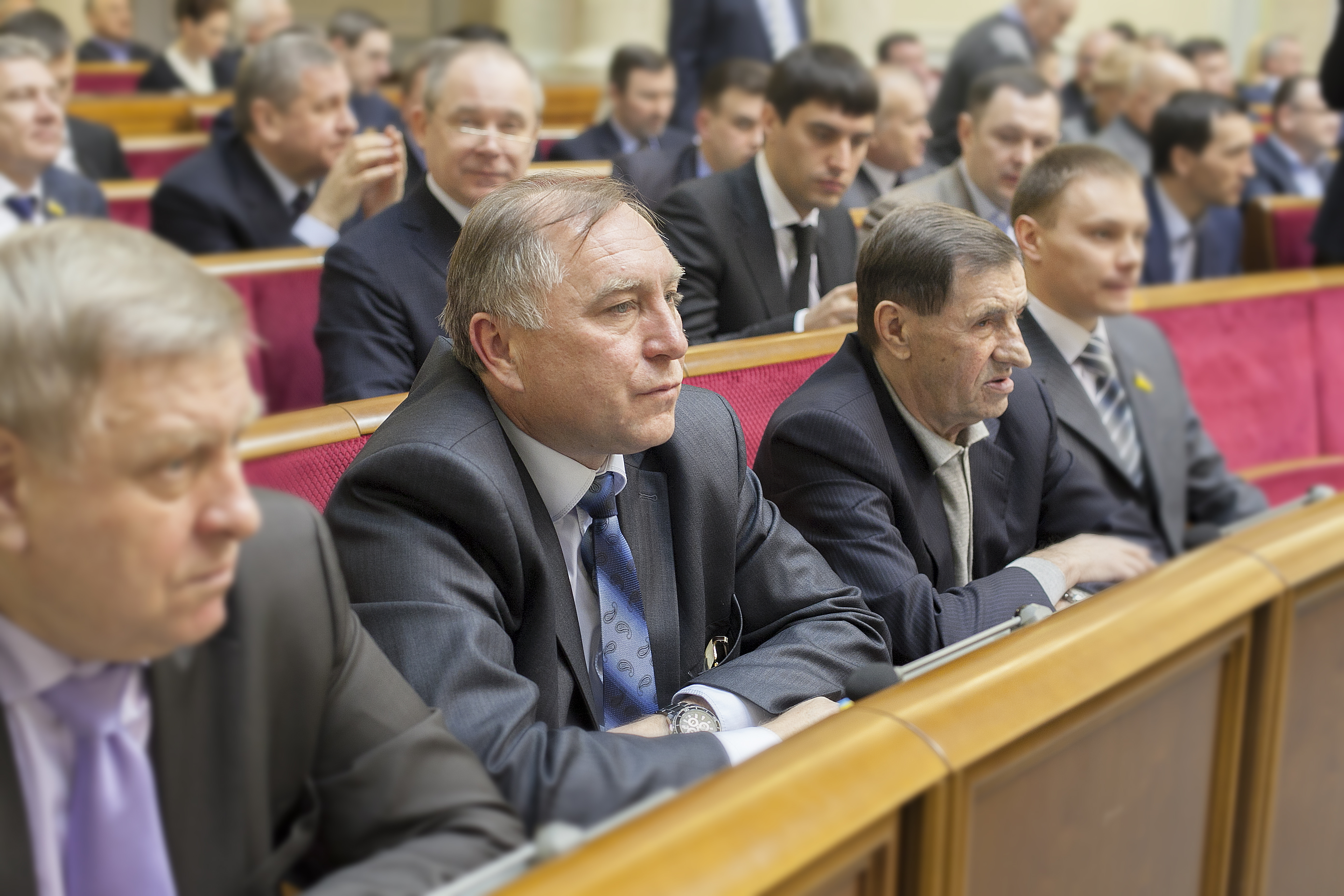

Occupation
- Activity sectors: Government

Description
- Competencies: Legislation
- Related jobs: Government official, President of Ukraine

A People's Deputy of Ukraine (Ukrainian: народний депутат України, romanized: narodnyj deputat Ukraïny, IPA: [nɐˈrɔdnɪj depʊˈtɑt ʊkrɐˈjinɪ]) is a member of parliament and legislator elected by popular vote to the Verkhovna Rada, the parliament of Ukraine. They are often referred to simply as "deputies". Prior to 1991, the Verkhovna Rada had been called the Supreme Council of People's Deputies of the Ukrainian Soviet Socialist Republic.

Statutes concerning elections and the rights and duties of deputies are outlined in Articles 76–81 of the Constitution of Ukraine. Ukraine's parliament has 450 seats. Deputies may be appointed to various parliamentary positions such as chairperson (speaker) of the Verkhovna Rada, a head of a committee, or a head of a parliamentary faction. Upon taking office, each deputy receives a deputy mandate.

People's deputies elected to the Verkhovna Rada as independent candidates may choose to join factions.

Since 2016, anti-corruption regulations mandate senior public officials (including deputies) must disclose their wealth, which is recorded in an electronic database.

== Requirements ==
=== Election eligibility ===
A person may be elected as a People's Deputy of Ukraine if they are Ukrainian citizen who, on the day of elections, is at least 21 years of age, has the right to vote, and has resided within Ukraine for the last five years. There have been some deputies who, before being elected to parliament, held Ukrainian citizenship for no longer than two years; these include Dmytro Salamatin, Vadim Novinsky, and others.

A citizen cannot be elected to the Verkhovna Rada if they have been convicted for a crime unless that conviction is extinguished or legally removed.

=== Duties ===
Each deputy carries out their duties on a continuous basis.

A deputy may not possess any other representative mandates, be appointed to the state service, be placed in other salaried positions, participate in other paid or entrepreneurial activities (except teaching, scientific, or artistic pursuits), or be a member of a governing body, a supervisory council of a company, or a for-profit organization. Within 20 days of winning an election, a victorious candidate must submit documents to the Central Election Commission of Ukraine confirming their dismissal from their previous workplace.

Activities considered incompatible with the duties of a deputy are legally prohibited. If a deputy has violated their mandate by failing to refrain from proscribed activities, they are required to either cease that activity or submit a statement of resignation within 20 days after the violation is discovered.

On 13 March 2012, the Constitutional Court of Ukraine banned public officials and people's deputies from participating in general meetings of for-profit companies or organizations deemed unconstitutional.

In October 2016 a requirement was placed upon deputies to declare their wealth. In the first register, 413 deputies cumulatively declared wealth of $460 million. Reacting to public criticism, deputies cancelled a raise that would have doubled their salary. This measure was part of an Anti-Corruption Package passed into law in October 2014, which was a requirement of international financial support for Ukraine.

== Oath of office ==
Before assuming office, the Verkhovna Rada's deputies must take the following oath before the parliament:

Ukrainian: Присягаю на вірність Україні. Зобов'язуюсь усіма своїми діями боронити суверенітет і незалежність України, дбати про благо Вітчизни і добробут Українського народу.
Присягаю додержуватися Конституції України та законів України, виконувати свої обов'язки в інтересах усіх співвітчизників.

I swear allegiance to Ukraine. I commit myself with all my deeds to protect the sovereignty and independence of Ukraine, to provide for the good of the Motherland and for the welfare of the Ukrainian people.
I swear to abide by the Constitution of Ukraine and the laws of Ukraine, to carry out my duties in the interests of all compatriots.

— Constitution of Ukraine, Article 79

Prior to the 2014 Ukrainian parliamentary election the oath was read by the eldest deputy before the opening of the first session of the newly elected Ukrainian Parliament, after which deputies affirmed the oath by their signatures under its text. As of the first session of the 27 November 2014 parliament, all deputies are required to read the oath aloud simultaneously. The oath marks the beginning of a deputy's accession to power. Refusing the oath will result in the forfeiture of their mandate.

== Immunity ==
Until December 2019, deputies were guaranteed parliamentary immunity. This meant they could not be held criminally liable, detained, or arrested without the consent of the Verkhovna Rada.

In December 2019, deputy parliamentary immunity was largely abolished, with the exception of voting records and statements made within parliament or its bodies.

== Termination of office ==
The authority of Peoples' Deputies of Ukraine lapses at the end of the official session (convocation) of the Verkhovna Rada.

The authority of a deputy may be ended early in some cases, including:

- resignation via personal statement
- a criminal conviction
- a court recognition of disability or absence without notice
- renunciation of Ukrainian citizenship or leaving Ukraine for permanent residence abroad
- continued participation in activities considered legally incompatible with the obligations of a deputy
- failure of a deputy elected by a political party to join that party's parliamentary faction (imperative mandate)
- death

The Verkhovna Rada terminates the powers of People's Deputies appointed to the Cabinet of Ministers of Ukraine.

== Misconduct and voting fraud ==
Absence from parliamentary meetings is punished by withholding salary.

=== Tushky ===
Tushky is a pejorative term used to denigrate deputies who participate in party switching.

=== Knopkodavy ===
Knopkodavy (lit. 'button-pushers') refers to deputies who fraudulently cast a vote for deputies who are absent. Voting for non-present colleagues, known as "piano voting", is notorious in Ukraine. Multiple deputies have reported that, despite being unable to vote, votes attributed to them were registered in parliament. In April 2011, a deputy was registered as having voted despite dying four days earlier.

Voting for other deputies became prohibited by law in February 2013. In December 2019, legislation was passed that made "button pushing" punishable by a fine of ₴3,000–5,000. Both measures did little to reduce or prevent piano voting. The first attempt to hold a deputy legally accountable for piano voting was announced by Prosecutor General Iryna Venediktova on 12 February 2021.

On 2 March 2021, the Ukrainian parliament began using pressure sensors to prevent piano voting. Voting with one hand, a deputy must use the hand other to apply continuous pressure on the sensor, making simultaneous operation of multiple voting machines difficult. This is intended to prevent deputies from using the voting machines of their absent neighbours.

== See also ==
- Corruption in Ukraine#Political corruption
- Deputy (legislator)
- Member of Parliament
- List of members of the Verkhovna Rada of Ukraine who died in office
