= 2006 Ukrainian political crisis =

The 2006 Parliamentary crisis in Ukraine started in March 2006 as a result of inconclusive parliamentary elections, and ended on 3 August 2006 with Viktor Yanukovych (as part of the Alliance of National Unity) being chosen as a Prime Minister to replace Yuriy Yekhanurov, who resigned right after the parliamentary elections.

== History ==
Many speculated that Bloc Yulia Tymoshenko (BYuT) might form a coalition with Our Ukraine party and the Socialist Party of Ukraine (SPU) to prevent the Party of Regions from gaining power. Yulia Tymoshenko solicited to become prime minister. However, negotiations with Our Ukraine and SPU faced many difficulties as the various blocs scrapped over posts and engaged in counter-negotiations with other groupings. Apparently President Viktor Yushchenko did not want Tymoshenko to become Prime Minister. Initially SPU's Oleksandr Moroz wanted the post of Chairman of the Verkhovna Rada.

On Wednesday 21 June 2006, the Ukrainian media reported that the three parties had finally reached a coalition agreement, which appeared to have ended nearly three months of political uncertainty.

Tymoshenko's nomination and confirmation as new prime minister was expected to be straightforward. However, the nomination was preconditioned on an election of her long-term rival Petro Poroshenko from Our Ukraine as the speaker of the parliament. Tymoshenko stated that she would vote for any speaker from the coalition. Within a few days after the coalition agreement had been signed, it became clear that the coalition members mistrusted each other, since they considered it to be a deviation from parliamentary procedures in order to hold a simultaneous vote on Poroshenko as the speaker and Tymoshenko as prime minister.

The Party of Regions announced an ultimatum to the coalition, demanding that the parliamentary procedures be observed, asking membership in parliamentary committees to be allocated in proportion to seats held by each fraction, chairmanship in certain Parliamentary committees as well as Governorships in the administrative subdivisions won by the Party of Regions. The Party of Regions complained the coalition agreement deprived the Party of Regions and the communists of any representation in the executive and leadership in parliamentary committees while in the local regional councils won by the Party of Regions, the coalition parties were locked out of all committees as well.

Members from the Party of Regions blocked the parliament from Thursday, 29 June through Thursday, 6 July.

Following a surprise nomination of Moroz as the Rada Chairman and his subsequent election late on 6 July with the support of the Party of Regions, the "Orange coalition" collapsed (Poroshenko had withdrawn his candidacy and had urged Moroz to do the same on 7 July). After the creation of a large coalition of majority (the so-called Alliance of National Unity), led by the former prime minister Viktor Yanukovych and composed of the Party of Regions, Socialists and Communists, Viktor Yanukovych became prime minister. Whilst Tymoshenko immediately announced that her political force would be in opposition to the new government, after the signing of the Universal of National Unity Our Ukraine initially wanted to join this coalition and indeed five of its members where appointed Cabinet of Ministers in the coalition, but in October 2006 Our Ukraine joined the opposition. By November 2006 the five ministers were dismissed by parliament or withdrawn by Our Ukraine.

Following the 2007 Ukrainian political crisis new elections were called and held in 2007.

== See also ==
- 2007 Ukrainian political crisis
- 2020–2022 Ukrainian constitutional crisis
