= Central Election Commission (Ukraine) =

Government body

Coordinates: 50°25′40″N 30°32′28″E

- Центральна виборча комісія
- CEC logo

Agency overview
- Formed: November 1997
- Jurisdiction: Ukraine
- Headquarters: 1, Lesia Ukrainka Square, Kyiv, Ukraine, 01196
- Agency executive: Oleh Didenko (since 4 October 2019), Chairperson of the Commission
- Website: Official website

The Central Election Commission of Ukraine (Ukrainian: Центральна виборча комісія України, romanized: Tsentralna vyborcha komisiia Ukrainy, commonly abbreviated as ЦВК, TsVK, IPA: [ˌtsɛweˈkɑ]); sometimes referred to as the Central Electoral Commission of Ukraine) is a permanent and independent collegiate body of the Ukrainian state that acts on the basis of the Constitution of Ukraine, the laws of Ukraine and is responsible for organizing the arrangements and the conduct of the presidential and parliamentary elections in Ukraine as well as the local elections at all levels, managing the all-Ukrainian and local referendums according to the procedure and within the legal framework defined by the laws of Ukraine.

== Legislative status ==
The Commission manages the system of election commissions and referendum commissions established to arrange and conduct the presidential and parliamentary elections in Ukraine as well as the all-Ukrainian referendums. The Commission supervises activities and provides the advisory and methodological support to the commissions established to arrange and conduct the local elections at all levels as well as the local referendums.

The Commission discharges its mandate independently, separately from other government authorities, municipalities, officials and public officers.

== General Information, Composition and Appointment ==
In November 1997 a new state institution, the Central Election Commission, was established according to the Constitution requirements. The Law of Ukraine "On the Central Election Commission" stipulates that the Central Election Commission shall be a permanent state body, which, in compliance with the Constitution of Ukraine, ensures the arrangements and the conduct of the presidential and parliamentary elections in Ukraine as well as the all-Ukrainian referendums.

The Central Election Commission also provides advisory-methodological support of elections and local referendums to local councils, village, town, city mayors. It supervises the system of election commissions established to arrange and conduct the presidential and parliamentary elections in Ukraine as well as the all-Ukrainian referendums, coordinates their activities.

The Central Election Commission is an independent state body. In order to perform its functions the Commission is entitled to enable the involvement of public authorities at all levels into the implementation of this extremely important state activity. The Commission performs its duties on the principles of legality, independence, objectivity, competence, professionalism, collegial decision-making, reliability, openness and transparency.

The activities of the Commission are carried out openly and publicly.

The Commission has its own publication - "The Bulletin of the Central Election Commission".

The Verkhovna Rada of Ukraine appoints and terminates the authority of the CEC members upon the proposal of the President of Ukraine. The presidential submission on the CEC members shall take into account the nominee proposals of current parliamentary factions and groups.

Composition

The Commission consists of 17 CEC members (prior to September 2018 15 members). The Commission functions on a regular basis. Member of the Commission is a public officer. Each member is appointed for a 7-year term by the Verkhovna Rada (parliament) of Ukraine. A Commission member may be a citizen of Ukraine, who shall not be under twenty five years old on the appointment date, has the right to vote, has been lived in Ukraine for at least the last five years and commands the official language. The Chairperson of the Commission, the Deputy Chair of the Commission, the Secretary of the Commission, as well as at least five other members of the Commission shall have higher education in the field of law.

=== Secretariat of the Commission ===
- Chairman
- Deputy
- Operation-Methodical Department
- Legal Department
- Informational Department
- Department of Document Support
- Managing and Material-Technical Support Department
- Division in relationships with public media
- Division of human resources and the state service
- Division of planning and financing
- Division of control and use of funds
- Accounting division
- Division of international cooperation
- Editorial-publishing division
- Supporting service of the Central Election Commission

== History ==
The first election commission in Ukraine was created in 1917 as an Electoral Bureau of the General Secretary of Internal Affairs and was headed by Mykhailo Kovenko. It prepared elections to the Ukrainian Constituent Assembly, which were interrupted by the Ukrainian-Soviet War. In 1989 the modern election commission was created under the Cabinet of Ukraine, which in 1997 became an independent body of the Ukrainian government.

== Districts ==
There are different electoral divisions depending on the level of elections. Before the electoral of 1997 and the installation of the Central Election Commission the country consisted of 450 electoral districts (number of parliamentarians in Verkhovna Rada). With the introduction of party voting principle the number of districts changed to 225. Each electoral district includes around 120-180 smaller electoral precincts (dilnytsi).

Beside the national level elections the country conducts local elections as well. Each region (oblast or Autonomous Republic Crimea), district (raion), urban or rural settlement (see Administrative divisions of Ukraine) has its own council (rada) amounting altogether to some 12,088 councils of various size across the nation.

=== Western Ukraine ===
Election year	Zakarpattia			Chernivtsi			Ivano-Frankivsk			Lviv			Ternopil			Volyn			Rivne		
Election year	districts	number		districts	number		districts	number		districts	number		districts	number		districts	number		districts	number	
Election year	districts	total	change	districts	total	change	districts	total	change	districts	total	change	districts	total	change	districts	total	change	districts	total	change
1990	167-177	11	0	430-437	8	0	196-207	12	0	258-281	24	0	355-364	10	0	40-48	9	0	332-341	10	0
1994	167-176	10	▼1	431-438	8	0	195-206	12	0	260-282	23	▼1	356-365	10	0	64-72	9	0	333-342	10	0
1998	70-74	5	▼5	202-205	4	▼4	84-89	6	▼6	115-126	12	▼11	163-167	5	▼5	19-23	5	▼4	152-156	5	▼5
1999	70-74	5	0	202-205	4	0	84-89	6	0	115-126	12	0	163-167	5	0	19-23	5	0	152-156	5	0
2002	70-75	6	▲1	202-205	4	0	85-90	6	0	116-127	12	0	164-168	5	0	19-23	5	0	153-157	5	0
2004	70-75	6	0	204-207	4	0	85-90	6	0	117-128	12	0	166-170	5	0	19-23	5	0	155-159	5	0
2006	66-70	5	▼1	207-210	4	0	79-85	7	▲1	112-125	14	▲2	165-172	8	▲3	20-26	7	▲2	151-157	7	▲2
2007	66-70	5	0	207-210	4	0	79-85	7	0	112-125	14	0	165-172	8	0	20-26	5	0	151-157	7	0
2010	69-74	6	▲1	204-207	4	0	84-90	7	0	117-128	12	▼2	165-169	5	▼3	19-23	5	▼2	154-158	5	▼2
2012	68-73	5	0	201-204	4	0	83-89	7	0	115-126	12	0	163-167	5	0	19-23	5	0	152-156	5	0

Presidential elections

=== Northern Ukraine ===
Election year	Zhytomyr			Kyiv			Kyiv city			Chernihiv			Sumy		
Election year	districts	number		districts	number		districts	number		districts	number		districts	number	
Election year	districts	total	change	districts	total	change	districts	total	change	districts	total	change	districts	total	change
1990	153-166	14	0	208-224	17	0	1-22	22	0	438-450	13	0	342-354	13	0
1994	154-166	13	▼1	207-223	17	0	1-23	23	▲1	439-450	12	▼1	343-355	13	0
1998	64-69	6	▼7	90-97	8	▼9	212-223	12	▼11	206-211	6	▼6	157-162	6	▼7
1999	64-69	6	0	90-97	8	0	212-223	12	0	206-211	6	0	157-162	6	0
2002	64-69	6	0	91-98	8	0	212-223	12	0	206-211	6	0	158-163	6	0
2004	64-69	6	0	91-99	9	▲1	214-223	10	▼2	208-213	6	0	160-165	6	0
2006	56-65	10	▲4	86-94	9	0	218-224	7	▼3	211-217	7	▲1	158-164	7	▲1
2007	56-65	10	0	86-94	9	0	218-224	7	0	211-217	7	0	158-164	7	0
2010	63-68	6	▼4	91-99	9	0	214-223	10	▲3	208-213	6	▼1	159-164	6	▼1
2012	62-67	6	0	90-98	9	0	211-223	13	▲3	205-210	6	0	157-162	6	0

Presidential elections

== Members ==
The current Central Election Commission approved by parliament on 4 October 2019 includes 17 members:

- Oleh Didenko (chairman)
- Oksana Boyarchuk
- Yuriy Buhlaka
- Olena Hataullina
- Andriy Hevko
- Viktoria Glushchenko
- Vitaliy Gren
- Serhiy Dubovyk
- Andriy Yevstihneyev
- Iryna Yefremova
- Oleksandra Karmaza
- Pavlo Liubchenko
- Yuriy Myroshnychenko
- Volodymyr Perepeliuk
- Vitaliy Plukar
- Serhiy Postivyi
- Yuriy Frytsky

=== Former members ===
On 5 October 2018 14 new members began to exercise their powers (the Ukrainian parliament had appointed on 20 September 2018):

- Tetiana Slipachuk (Chairperson of the Central Election Commission)
- Alla Basalaieva
- Natalia Bernatska (Secretary of the Central Election Commission)
- Mykhailo Verbenskyi
- Andriy Yevstigneiev
- Iryna Yefremova
- Olha Zheltova
- Oleh Konopolskyi (Deputy Chair of the Central Election Commission)
- Svitlana Kustova
- Olha Lotiuk
- Vitaliy Plukar
- Yevhenii Radchenko (Deputy Chair of the Central Election Commission)
- Leontiy Shypilov
- Tetiana Yuzkova

In April 2014 parliament had already appointed:

- Kateryna Makhnitska
- Oleh Didenko

As of 20 September 2018 one seat was vacant.

All members (appointed on 20 September 2018 and since) were dismissed by parliament on 13 September 2019.

The Ukrainian parliament dismissed the following 13 members of the Central Election Commission on 20 September 2018:

- Mykhaylo Okhendovsky (Охендовський Михайло Володимирович) (chairman)
- Andriy Mahera (Магера Андрій Йосипович) (deputy chairman)
- Zhanna Usenko-Chorna (Усенко-Чорна Жанна Іванівна) (deputy chairwoman)
- Tetiana Lukash (Лукаш Тетяна Леонідівна) (secretary)
- Tamara Astakhova (Астахова Тамара Валеріївна)
- Yuriy Danylevskyi (Данилевський Юрій Миколайович)
- Yuriy Donchenko (Донченко Юрій Григорович)
- Ihor Zhydenko (Жиденко Ігор Григорович)
- Bronislav Raykovskyy (Райковський Броніслав Станіславович)
- Oleksandr Chupakhin (Чупахін Олександр Михайлович)
- Yulia Shvets (Швець Юлія Вікторівна)
- Oleksandr Shelestov (Шелестов Олександр Миколайович)
- Valeriy Sheludko (Шелудько Валерій Євгенович)

Former members of the Commission were appointed by the parliament on 8 December 2004. This appointment was an integral part of the legislative package to resolve the presidential election crisis in Ukraine. These members supervised the repeat of the second round of the presidential elections on 26 December 2004.

Members of the Commission as of 1 January 2005 were:

- Yaroslav Davydovych (Давидович Ярослав Васильович) (chairman)
- Maryna Stavniychuk (Ставнійчук Марина Іванівна) (deputy chairwoman)
- Mykola Melnyk (Мельник Микола Іванович) (deputy chairman)
- Serhiy Dubovyk (Дубовик Сергій Олегович) (secretary)
- Yuriy Donchenko (Донченко Юрій Григорович)
- Valentyna Zavalevska (Завалевська Валентина Олександрівна)
- Ihor Kachur (Качур Ігор Анатолійович)
- Ruslan Knyazevych (Князевич Руслан Петрович)
- Andriy Mahera (Магера Андрій Йосипович)
- Mykhaylo Okhendrovskyy (Охендовський Михайло Володимирович)
- Anatoliy Pysarenko (Писаренко Анатолій Аркадійович)
- Bronislav Raykovskyy (Райковський Броніслав Станіславович)
- Zhanna Usenko-Chorna (Усенко-Чорна Жанна Іванівна)
- Oleksandr Chupakhin (Чупахін Олександр Михайлович)
- Valeriy Sheludko (Шелудько Валерій Євгенович)

=== Previous Members ===
- Valeriy Bondyk (Бондик Валерій Анатолійович) (17 February 2004 – 8 December 2004)
- Yuriy Danylevskyy (Данилевський Юрій Миколайович) (7 April 1999 – 8 December 2004)
- Serhiy Kivalov (Ківалов Сергій Васильович) (17 February – 8 December 2004); currently a member of the Parliament of Ukraine
- Mykola Rybachuk (Рибачук Микола Филимонович) (7 April 1999 – 8 December 2004)

=== Chairmen ===
- 1989–1992 Vitaliy Boiko (also Minister of Justice of Ukrainian SSR—Ukraine) (commission of 45 members)
  - 1992–1993 Oleksandr Lavrynovych (acting chairman)
- 1993–1997 Ivan Yemets (commission of 16 members)
- 1997–2004 Mykhailo Ryabets (commission of 42 members)
- 2004–2004 Serhiy Kivalov
- 2004–2007 Yaroslav Davydovych
- 2007–2013 Volodymyr Shapoval
- 2013–2018 Mykhaylo Okhendovsky
- 2018–2019 Tetiana Slipachuk
- 2019–present Oleh Didenko

== See also ==
- Elections in Ukraine

=== Presidential elections ===
- 2019 Ukrainian presidential election
- 2014 Ukrainian presidential election
- 2010 Ukrainian presidential election
- 2004 Ukrainian presidential election
- 1999 Ukrainian presidential election
- 1994 Ukrainian presidential election
- 1991 Ukrainian presidential election

=== Parliamentary elections ===
- 2019 Ukrainian parliamentary election
- 2014 Ukrainian parliamentary election
- 2012 Ukrainian parliamentary election
- 2007 Ukrainian parliamentary election
- 2006 Ukrainian parliamentary election
- 2002 Ukrainian parliamentary election
- 1998 Ukrainian parliamentary election
- 1994 Ukrainian parliamentary election
