= Ukrainian presidential inauguration =

Presidential inauguration

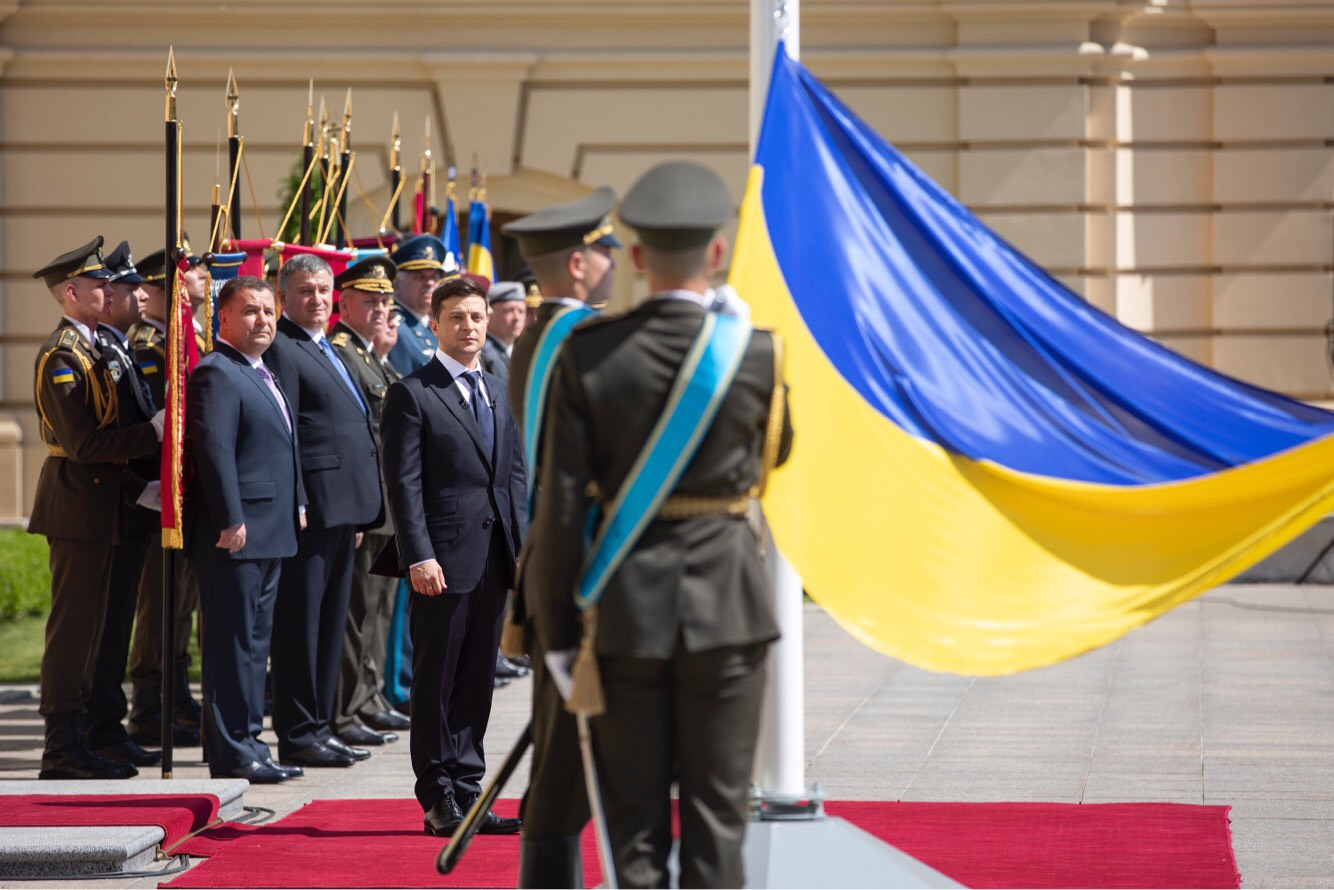
President Volodymyr Zelenskyy watches as the Flag of Ukraine is being raised at the Mariinskyi Palace during his inauguration in May 2019.

The Inauguration of the President of Ukraine is a ceremony that takes place to mark the start of a new term for a newly elected president.

== Description ==
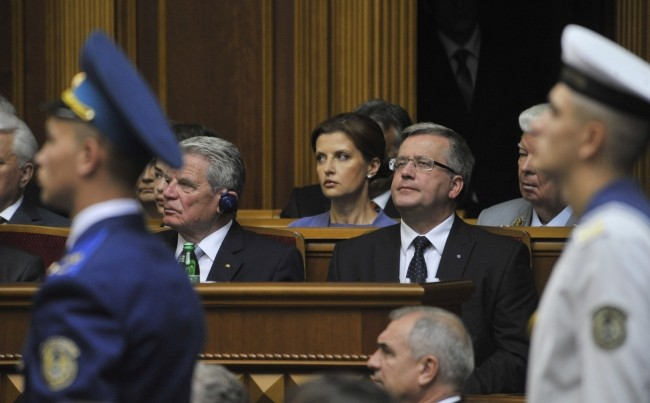
Polish President Bronisław Komorowski at the inauguration of Petro Poroshenko.

The presidential inauguration traditionally starts at the building of the Verkhovna Rada building in the center of the Pecherskyi District in Kyiv. Prior to the arrival of the president-elect, the chairman of the Verkhovna Rada introduces distinguished dignitaries including foreign guests and former presidents. Upon arrival, the president goes into the main chamber to the tune of the presidential fanfare, before beginning the ceremonies with a rendition of Shche ne vmerla Ukraina by a choir and band. Once this is done, the president-elect will put their hand on the Constitution of Ukraine and the Peresopnytsia Gospels simultaneously while reciting the oath of office administered by the chairman of the Constitutional Court of Ukraine:

According to article 104 of the constitution, the Ukrainian text for the oath is as follows:

Я, (ім'я та прізвище), волею народу обраний Президентом України, заступаючи на цей високий пост, урочисто присягаю на вірність Україні. Зобов'язуюсь усіма своїми справами боронити суверенітет і незалежність України, дбати про благо Вітчизни і добробут Українського народу, обстоювати права і свободи громадян, додержуватися Конституції України і законів України, виконувати свої обов'язки в інтересах усіх співвітчизників, підносити авторитет України у світі.

Official English translation:

I, (name and surname), elected by the will of the people as the President of Ukraine, assuming this high office, do solemnly swear allegiance to Ukraine. I pledge with all my undertakings to protect the sovereignty and independence of Ukraine, to provide for the good of the Motherland and the welfare of the Ukrainian people, to protect the rights and freedoms of citizens, to abide by the Constitution of Ukraine and the laws of Ukraine, to exercise my duties in the interests of all compatriots, and to enhance the prestige of Ukraine in the world.

The new president then signs the text transfers it over to the chairman of the Constitutional Court after conducting the oath. The performance of the Molytva za Ukrainu (Prayer for Ukraine) will then follow. The president will then receive state symbols and heraldry, including the seal, the collar and bulava of the president of Ukraine. Once this is done, the president will deliver a speech that will be given in the Ukrainian language, although on some occasions Russian has been used throughout the speech. After the speech, the swearing-in-ceremony is declared closed and the president walks to the nearby Mariinskyi Palace to take the salute as supreme commander-in-chief of the Armed Forces of Ukraine. This formal military ceremony has also been known to take place at the Office of the President on Bankova and in 2014, on Sofia Square. During the ceremony the president receives the salute of the commander, Kyiv Presidential Honor Guard Battalion who reports the following:

Mr/Mrs President of Ukraine, Supreme Commander-in-chief of the Armed Forces of Ukraine, the Guard of Honour is formed up in your honor, Commander of the Guard of Honour, (states rank and name).

The president then inspects the guard before greeting them:

President: Glory to Ukraine!
Parade formation: Glory to the Heroes!

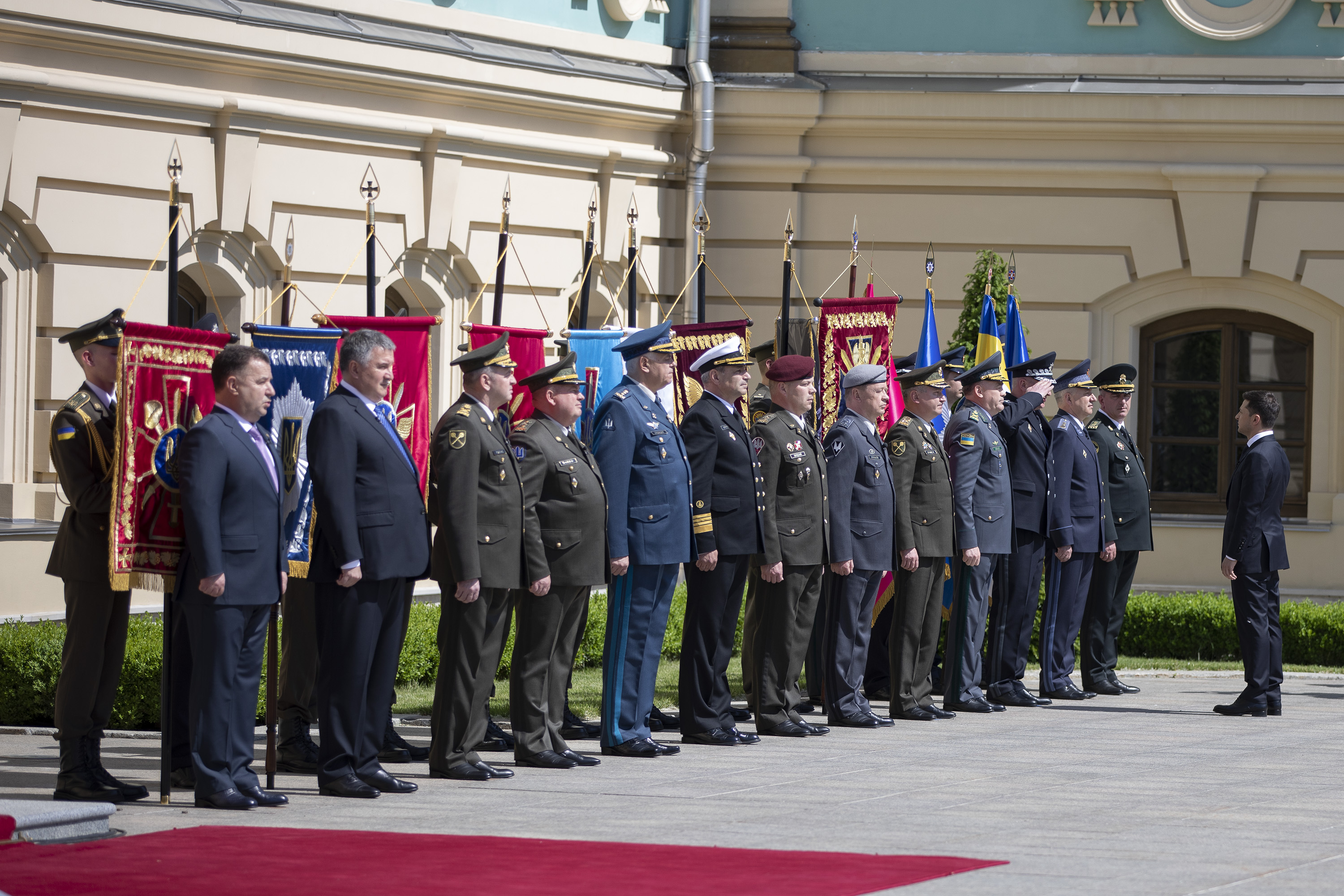
The senior leadership of the Ukrainian Armed Forces in May 2019.

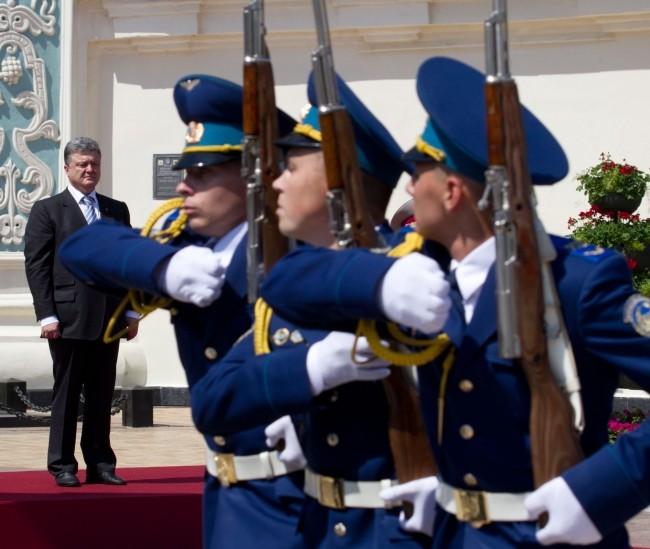
The marchpast on Sofia Square in 2014.

The president then goes on to receive the report from the chiefs of the senior administrative institutions and the uniformed services of the military, including the minister of defence and the head of the security service, as of the most recent inauguration in 2019, the commanders state their name and rank (only if in uniform) and declares their institution's readiness to carry out their task. After this the battalion performs a marchpast to the tune of a march by its attached military band before heading inside.

The entire ceremony is covered on Ukrainian TV channels such as NTN, 5 Kanal, 1+1 and ICTV.

== List of inaugural ceremonies ==
Date	President	Location^{Place}	Oath administered by^{Oath}	Document sworn on	Notes
December 5, 1991	Leonid Kravchuk	National Parliament session hall Kyiv	Unknown	Closed Act of Declaration of Independence of Ukraine and closed Constitution of the Ukrainian SSR^{Constitution}	
July 19, 1994	Leonid Kuchma	National Parliament session hall Kyiv	Unknown	Open Peresopnytsia Gospel	
November 30, 1999	Leonid Kuchma	Palace of Arts "Ukrayina" concert hall Kyiv	Viktor Skomorokha	Open Peresopnytsia Gospel and closed Constitution of Ukraine	
January 23, 2005	Viktor Yushchenko	National Parliament session hall Kyiv	Mykola Selivon	Closed Peresopnytsia Gospel and closed Constitution of Ukraine	First time the oath was taken in front of general public
February 25, 2010	Viktor Yanukovych	National Parliament session hall Kyiv	Andriy Stryzhak	Closed Peresopnytsia Gospel and closed Constitution of Ukraine	
June 7, 2014	Petro Poroshenko	National Parliament session hall Kyiv	Yuriy Baulin	Closed Peresopnytsia Gospel and closed Constitution of Ukraine	Main article: Inauguration of Petro Poroshenko
May 20, 2019	Volodymyr Zelenskyy	National Parliament session hall Kyiv	Nataliya Shaptala	Closed Peresopnytsia Gospel and closed Constitution of Ukraine	Main article: Inauguration of Volodymyr Zelenskyy

== List of historical inaugurations ==
=== Hetman of Ukraine ===
Date	Hetman	Location^{Place}	Confirmed by	Document Sworn On	Notes
April 29, 1918	Pavlo Skoropadsky	Saint Sophia's Cathedral; Kyiv	Nicodemus (temporarily governing Eparchy of Kyiv)	Unknown	

== Notes ==
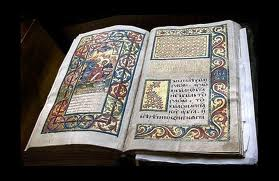
Pages on which took an oath Leonid Kuchma

- ^(Place) "at a ceremonial meeting of the Supreme Council of Ukraine" (Article 104, Constitution of Ukraine)
- ^(Oath) the Chairperson of the Constitutional Court of Ukraine (Article 104, Constitution of Ukraine)
- ^(Constitution) marked as Constitution of Ukraine
