= Symbols of Ukrainian people =

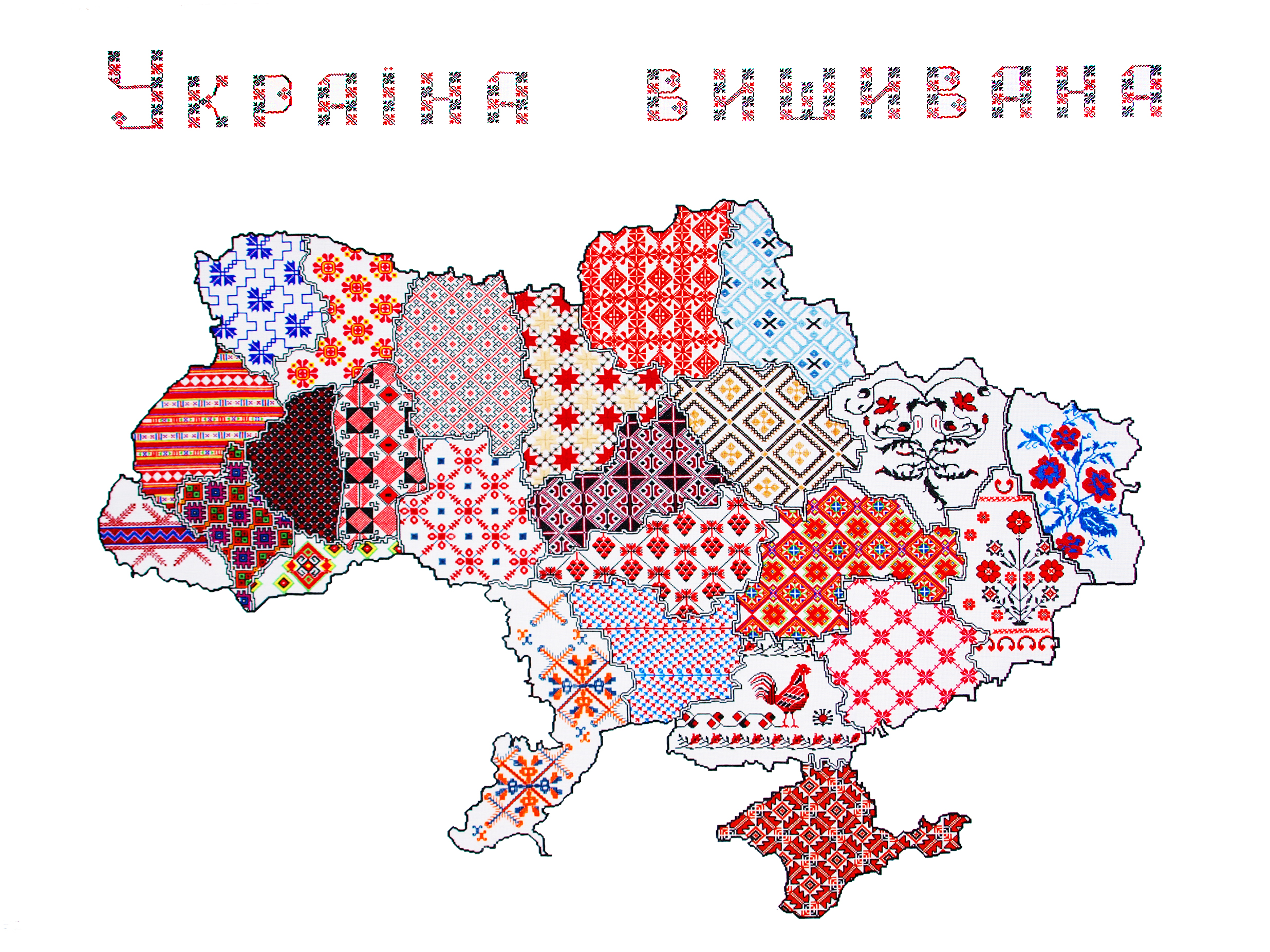
Embroidered Map of Ukraine

National symbols are the sacred attributes for Ukrainian people. In Ukrainian graphics there exist a number of symbols and images from national songs, legends. Such symbols and imagery are used in national customs and rituals. They are reproduced in embroidery on national costumes, ritual cloth—rushnyks, painted on crockery, in forged products, in carving, in bas-relief house decoration, in hearth painting, pottery, engraving and also in Ukrainian traditional Easter eggs—pysanky.

Symbols are roughly divided into animalistic and floral symbols.

Holy images (on wood, glass) were decorated by Ukrainian masters, with stylized symmetrical flowers, inflorescences and "apples", located in the upper part of an icon.

Among the motifs of decor of Ukrainian icons were such stylized flowers as clove, tulip, rose, lotus, pomegranate, lily, acanthus and vine.

Among the objects-amulets (rushnyks and icons) floral patterns dominated.

== Classification of symbols ==
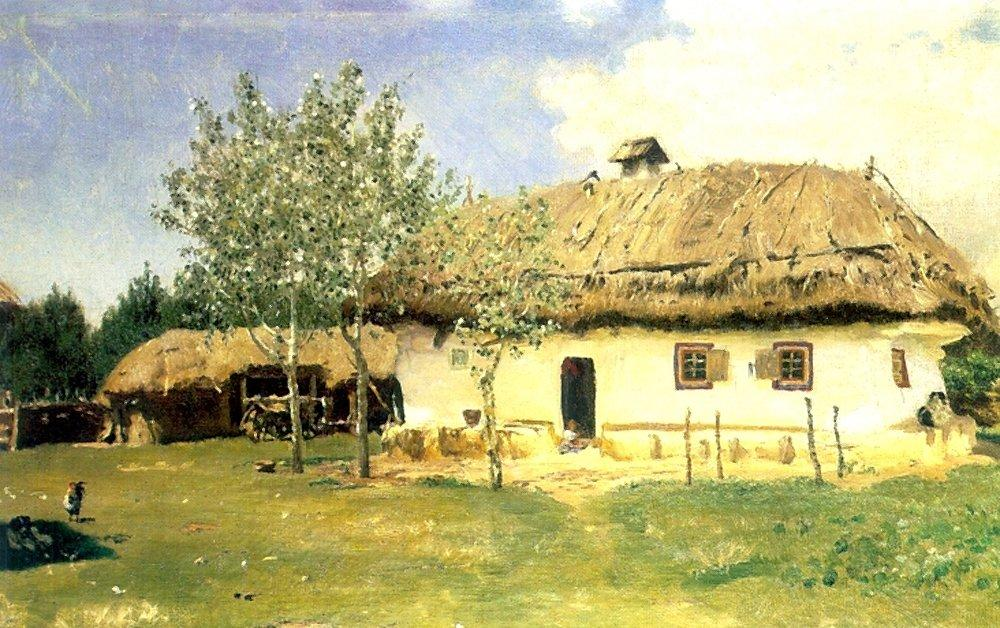
Khata by Repin

In the "Dictionary of Symbols of Culture of Ukraine", the following classification of symbols is given:

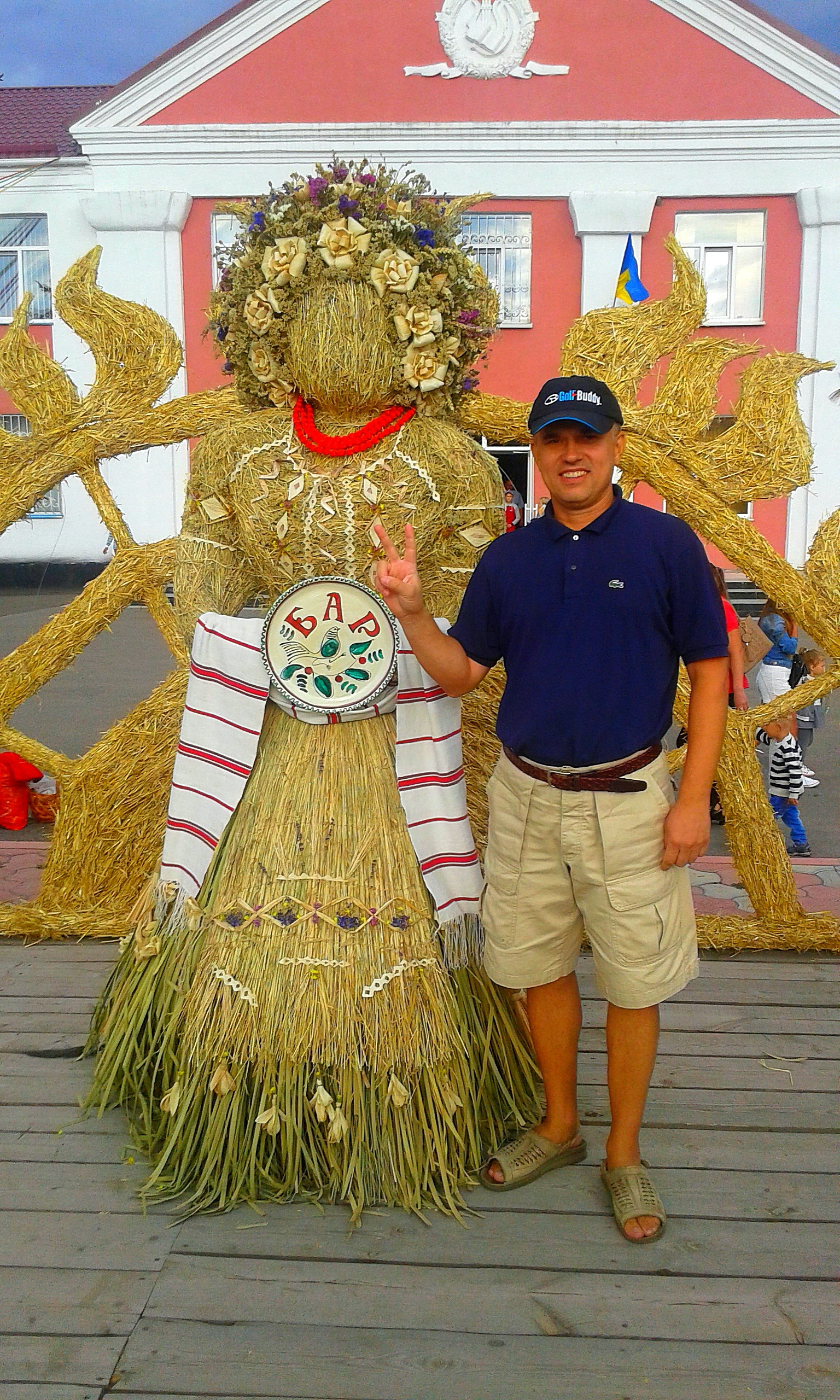
Ukrainian Folklore Festival

1. Settlements and housing of Ukrainians (hut, icon corner, gate).
2. Folk clothing (sheepskin coat, nankeen, outerwear).
3. Public life and customs (Zeleni Sviata holidays).
4. Branches of the economy, folk crafts (hay harvesting, weaving, Easter eggs paintings, spindle).
5. National botany, zoology, medicine, astronomy (pig, bees, stork, star).
6. Folk mythology, demonology (devil, dryad).
7. Paganism, Christianity (Bilobog, Yarylo, Jesus Christ).
8. Atmospheric phenomena, geographic names (dew, wind, Dnipro).
9. Numbers, geometric shapes (three, nine, circle).
10. Heraldry, numismatics, architecture (trident, temple).
11. Folklore (sorcery).
12. Folk customs, rituals, beliefs, traditions, games (symbols of folk games).
13. Colors, shapes, minerals, ornaments (white, red, dukach (traditional pendant).
14. Parts of the human body (head, eye, hand).
15. Zaporizhian Cossacks (Zaporizhian Sich).
16. Words, languages, speech, alphabets (symbols of the Slavonic alphabet, book, Logos).
17. Fiction, in particular H. S. Skovoroda, T. H. Shevchenko, M. T. Rylsky, O. T. Honchar, and others.
18. Kinesiks (аdoration, kiss).
19. Astrology, anthroponymics (anthroponymic symbols).
20. Geography, geology, soil science (mountain, stone, soil, west-east).
21. Flower gardening (poppy, mallow, lily of the valley, marigold).
22. Historical figures, prominent cultural figures (Taras Shevchenko, Marusia Churai).

== Clothes ==
=== Embroidered shirt (Vyshyvanka) ===
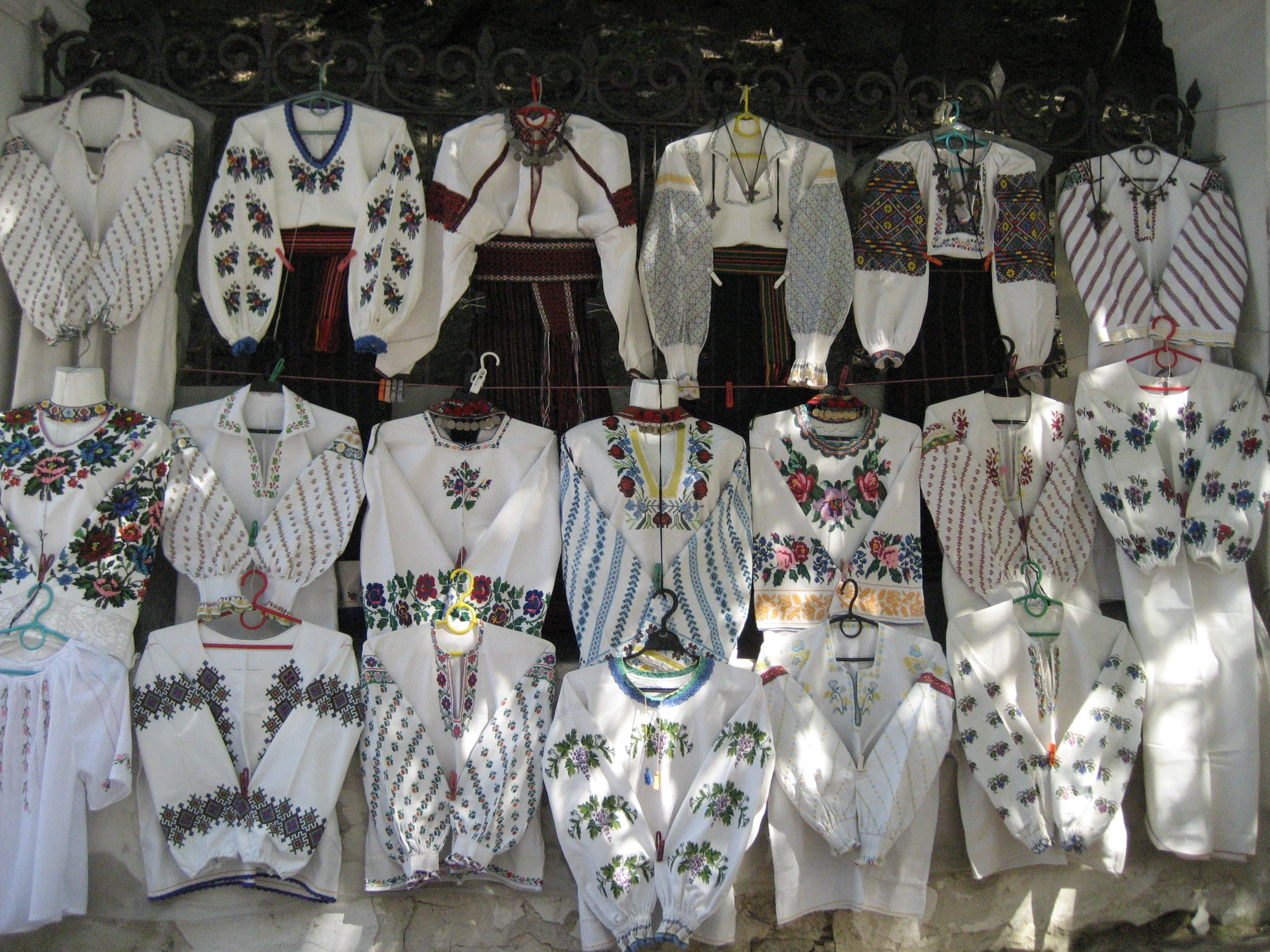
embroidered shirt

Vyshyvanka is an embroidered national women's and men's white shirt. Embroidered shirt is a symbol of health, beauty, happy destiny, generic memory, decency, honesty, love, festivity; amulet. The symbolism of embroidery depended on the person for whom it was made: a bridegroom, a husband, a young boy, a girl, a married woman.

Vyshyvanka was made from handmade flax or hemp cloth. There existed many types of traditional shirts depending on the shape, materials, semantics of colors. They were named after Ukrainian ethnographical regions where they were produced, such as Podillia, Halychyna, Polissia, Volyn, Dnipro, Poltava, Hutsulshchyna, Bukovina, Lemkivshchyna and others. The symbolism of embroidery often coincides with the symbols of objects ornaments of material Trypillia culture.

=== Wreath ===
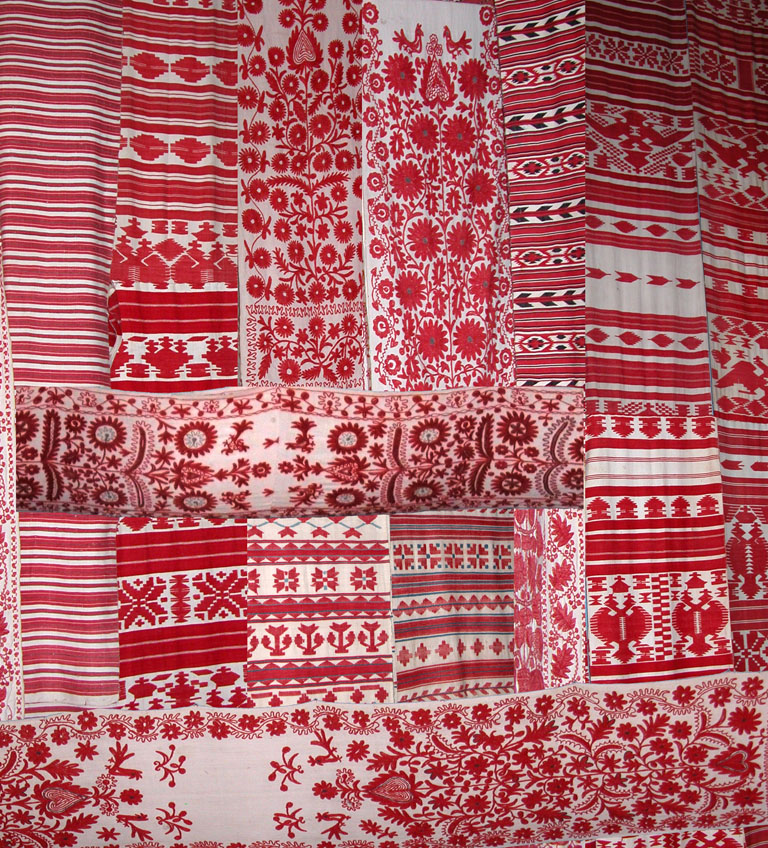
Rushnyk

Wreath is the symbol of life, destiny, life strength; symbol of virginity. Wreath is also a symbol of excellence.

=== Ukrainian embroidered cloth (Rushnyk) ===
The cloth band itself has a bright symbolic meaning of the way, destiny, protection. And when this band also has woven or embroidered signs-amulets its protective power grows. In all regions of Ukraine rushnyk was used to cover the bread on a table. When a son was heading long away from home, his mother gave him a rushnyk. In Ukraine guests are still greeted with salt and bread on rushnyk. In Ukrainian homes, rushnyks are hung above the icons and the portraits of family members. Rushnyk is used in many customs, above all in those related to marriage and sending someone off to the other world.

== Floristic symbols ==
Main floristic symbols include snowball tree, willow, oak, poplar, periwinkle, marigold. Since ancient times, they represent the beauty of Ukraine, spirit strength of Ukrainian nation, attesting love to the native land.

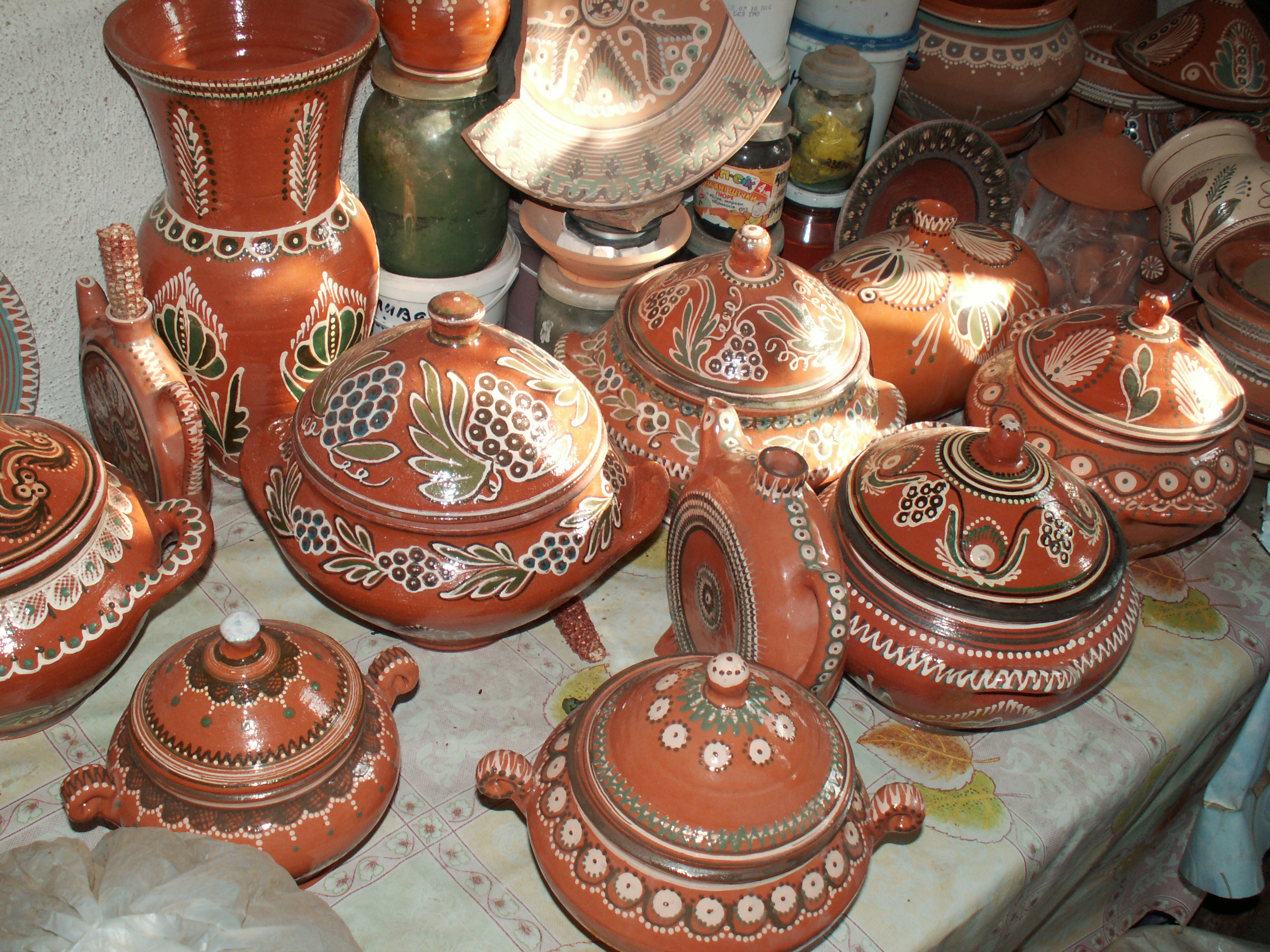
Ceramics ornaments

- Periwinkle symbolizes loyalty.
- Sunflower symbolizes coming to home.
- Сornflower is a symbol of modesty and tenderness.
- Chestnut is a symbol of Kyiv, the capital of Ukraine.
- Snowball tree is a symbol of life, blood, fire.
- Poppy symbolizes beauty and youth.
- Willow is a symbol of kin, world tree.
- Grape is a symbol of beauty of new family, well-being, fertility.
- Lily, as a flower dedicated to Virgin Mary, means purity and innocence.
- Oak is a sacred tree of the Slavonic world, a symbol of life, of the sun, of eternity of being, of the age and structure of the universe (the "world tree").
- Cherry is a symbol of the world tree, life; the symbol of Ukraine, native land; mother; bride.
- Violet is a symbol of fun and joy, a unity of a couple, forest violets signify sorrow.
- Hop is a symbol of fertility, young rampage.

== Animalistic symbols ==
There are a lot of fauna symbols in Ukrainian semantics. Fauna images have universal meaning in the symbolic system of Ukrainian folklore.

In embroidery of animalistic ornaments we may find depicted a horse, a hear, fish; birds: a rooster, an owl, a pigeon, a cuckoo; insects: a fly, a butterfly, a spider, flying bugs.

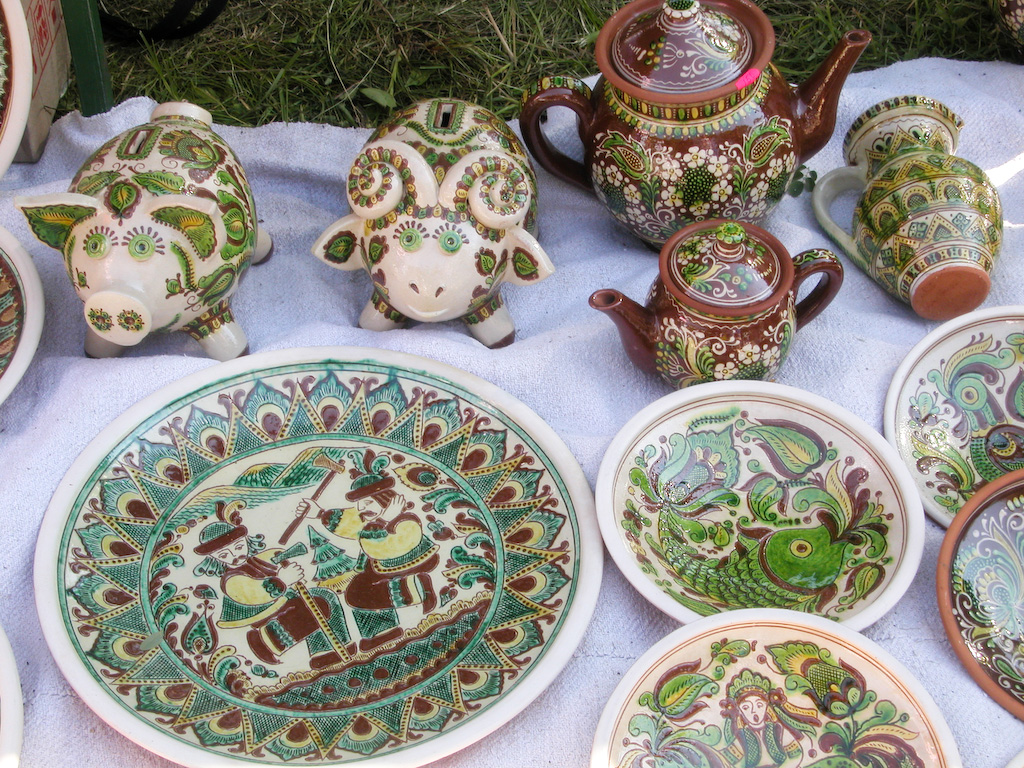
Ceramics ornaments

Such ornaments have ancient totem roots; a number of scholars: O. Znoiko, V. Davydiuk, H. Lozko, A. Chepa believe that goat and wolf are totem animals of tribes out of which Ukrainian nation was shaped.

- Aurochs is a symbol of fertility and strength.
- Goat symbolizes harvest and fertility.
- Horse is a symbol of loyalty, devotion, freedom.
- Cuckoo in Ukrainian songs is a symbol of a mother mourning her children.
- Crane is a symbol of sorrow for a native land.
- Swallow is a symbol of well-being, happiness, marriage consent, spring and nature rebirth. It is also a symbol of motherhood.
- Nightingale is a symbol of love to song.
- Stork is a favorite bird of Ukrainians. In Ukrainian it was named after the goddess of love and good Lelia. It is believed that stork brings kids into a family.
- Crow (in Ukrainian songs it appears on a battle place, death of cossacks).

== Didukh ==
Didukh (rye, wheat or oatmeal sheaf)—Ukrainian Christmas adornment.

== Painted Easter egg (Pysanka) ==
Pysanka is a symbol of the sun; life, his immortality; love and beauty; spring renewal; the good, happiness, joy. Every ornamental motif has a certain sacral meaning. They all together shape the painted prayer about consent and peace between people. In the Christian culture of Ukrainians, pysanka has become a symbol of resurrection. There is a Ukrainian saying: "As long as people paint pysanky, there will be love in the world".

== Hair ==
Hair is a symbol of the goddess of sky, earth, wealth; development of spirit strength; energy, fire, fertility, health; a symbol of sorrow, mourning; cut hair is a symbol of the fallen woman that got pregnant being unwed; lost virginity; birth-death; imperishable memory; an amulet.

== Holy images ==
In the adornment of hut holy images there can be traced certain affinity in decoration, weaving motifs, embroidery, ceramics, carving, wedding trunk painting, table paintings. This proves the mutual influence of different types of folk art.

Holy image painting of Hutsulshchyna and Pokuttia regions have the following ornamental elements:

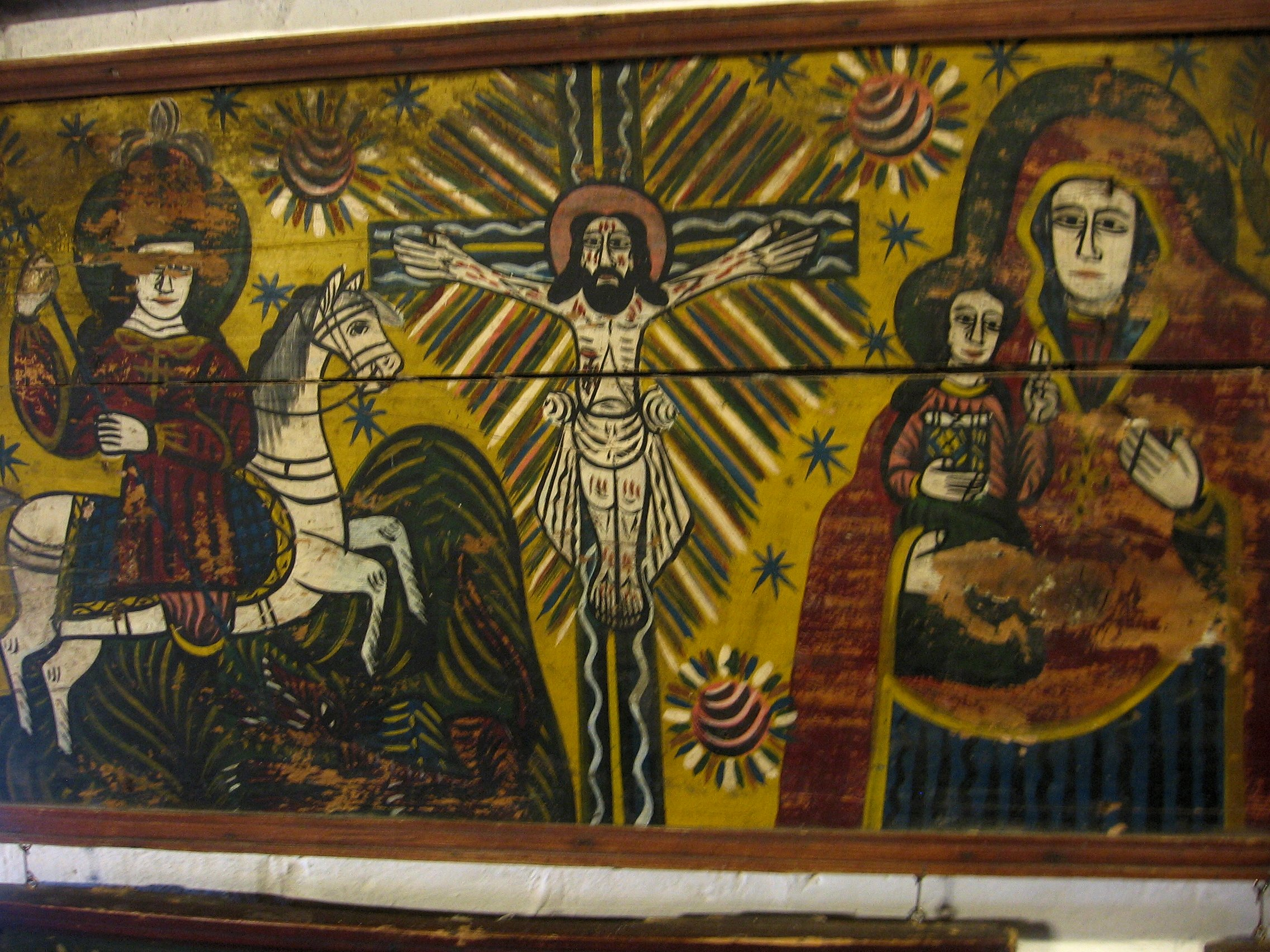
Radomyshl icon

- flower branches;
- tulips, combined with "Silesia rose";
- lilies;
- bells:
- wild rose.

Podillia region holy images outstand with decorations of

- lush flowers scattered with beams, bouquets of wreaths;
- palm and wreath;
- plants that are similar to palm branches or bells;
- branches-tassels;
- element of "apple" ornament.

The distinctive feature of holy images of Sivershchyna region have on their background different sized beads. Such an artistic technique gives the impression that the icon was dressed in a robe that resembles a delicate lace. The frame of such an icon is the flowers, painted in modernist style using a wavy line.

Iconography of Podniprovia region (Cherkasy region, in particular Chyhyrynshchyna), partly in Kyiv Polissia is poorly ornamented. The entire decoration is limited to two large flowers placed at the top of the icon or scattered throughout the background with small flowers in the form of stylized crosses of yellow and white.

Symbols of Cherkashchyna region are characterized by conventional floral ornaments such as bouquets, peonies, grape vine stems (grapes are isomorphic and stylized images, which emphasizes the compact grouping of rounded, dotted or even linear elements, resembling abundant grape clusters; grapevine is a symbol of the Eucharist, a symbol of Christ, His blood shed for the redemption of mankind from sins

The ornament in Slobozhanshchyna region icons is almost absent. On some icons, in particular, "The Virgin with the Baby", the background of the holy images is decorated with small asterisks (the stars are mostly octagonal, less often hexagonal, and, in exceptional cases, with four, five or another number of angles, placed on the entire background of the icon or only around the nymbs of the Theotokos and Jesus.

The most diverse forms of flowers can be found on the icons of Central and Eastern Ukraine. The ornamental decoration is characterized by the picturesqueness and ductility caused by the use of the impasto painting technique. Icons of Western Ukraine are characterized by a geometric interpretation of flowers, the basis and details of which are circles (sometimes ovals), bordered by the points, linear curl, which is achieved due to graphic techniques.

== See also ==
- State symbols of the President of Ukraine
- National colours of Ukraine
- Vyshyvanka
- Ukrainian wreath
