= List of Ukrainian oblasts and territories by life expectancy =

Life expectancy of Ukraine was 69.77 years in 2021.

From 2005 to 2019, the life expectancy of Ukraine had been increasing each year: from 67.96 years in 2005 to 72.01 years in 2019; during these years, life expectancy for males increased from 62.23 years to 66.92 years, and life expectancy for females increased from 73.97 years to 76.98 years. Despite this, Ukraine still had one of the largest gender gaps in life expectancy amongst the European countries: in 2019, life expectancy for males was 66.92 years (comparable to Pakistan's overall life expectancy), whereas life expectancy for females was 76.98 years (comparable to Hungary's overall life expectancy).

Urban areas also have consistently had greater life expectancy than rural areas: from 2005 to 2019, urban life expectancy had increased from 68.47 years to 72.66 years, whereas rural life expectancy had increased from 66.89 to 70.68 years.

== Latest data (2021) ==
Region	Overall	male	female	sex gap
Ukraine	69.77	65.16	74.36	9.20
Autonomous Republic of Crimea	—	—	—	—
Vinnytsia Oblast	71.18	66.47	75.84	9.37
Volyn Oblast	70.7	65.64	75.92	10.28
Dnipropetrovsk Oblast	68.42	63.64	73.09	9.45
Donetsk Oblast	—	—	—	—
Zhytomyr Oblast	68.21	63.21	73.45	10.24
Zakarpattia Oblast	69.45	65.82	73.11	7.29
Zaporizhzhia Oblast	68.64	63.76	73.51	9.75
Ivano-Frankivsk Oblast	72.03	67.49	76.56	9.07
Kyiv Oblast	68.1	63.11	73.19	10.08
Kirovohrad Oblast	68.63	63.92	73.31	9.39
Luhansk Oblast	—	—	—	—
Lviv Oblast	71.51	66.88	76.25	9.37
Mykolaiv Oblast	69.09	64.47	73.66	9.19
Odesa Oblast	69.21	65.02	73.35	8.33
Poltava Oblast	70.01	65.64	74.29	8.65
Rivne Oblast	69.92	64.94	75.11	10.17
Sumy Oblast	70.34	65.59	75.06	9.47
Ternopil Oblast	72.11	67.15	77.15	10.00
Kharkiv Oblast	68.73	64.53	72.83	8.30
Kherson Oblast	68.16	63.62	72.7	9.08
Khmelnytskyi Oblast	70.27	65.55	75.04	9.49
Cherkasy Oblast	70.57	65.82	75.28	9.46
Chernivtsi Oblast	71.27	67.34	75.09	7.75
Chernihiv Oblast	68.94	63.38	74.74	11.36
Kyiv	71.07	66.71	75.16	8.45
Sevastopol	—	—	—	—

== Past data(1989-2021) ==
Region	1989	1990	1991	1992	1993	1994	1995	1996	1997	1998	1999	2000	2001	2002	2003	2004	2005	2006	2007	2008	2009	2010	2011	2012	2013	2014	2015	2016	2017	2018	2019	2020	2021
Ukraine	70.89	70.42	69.56	68.97	68.29	67.66	66.79	67.08	67.66	68.50	68.07	67.72	67.89	68.32	68.24	68.22	67.96	68.10	68.25	68.27	69.29	70.44	71.02	71.15	71.37	71.37	71.38	71.68	71.98	71.76	72.01	71.35	69.77
Autonomous Republic of Crimea	70.76	70.12	69.34	68.79	67.87	65.59	65.32	66.23	67.69	68.27	68.75	67.91	67.97	68.14	67.78	67.85	67.73	67.91	67.96	68.05	69.30	70.45	70.84	71.40	71.59	Annexed by Russia in 2014							
Vinnytsia Oblast	71.14	70.33	69.25	69.35	68.59	67.98	67.59	67.80	68.11	68.79	68.74	68.61	68.97	69.48	69.41	69.30	68.77	68.78	69.02	69.20	70.37	71.49	71.89	71.95	71.93	71.93	72.01	72.47	72.70	72.69	72.69	72.24	71.18
Volyn Oblast	71.80	71.18	70.13	69.63	69.13	68.55	68.27	68.40	68.41	69.03	68.40	68.30	68.47	68.87	68.81	68.84	68.45	68.38	68.64	68.64	69.51	70.55	70.95	71.41	71.46	71.35	71.51	71.76	71.94	71.49	71.94	71.29	70.70
Dnipropetrovsk Oblast	70.51	70.40	69.61	68.51	67.66	66.81	65.79	65.70	66.17	67.35	66.71	66.36	66.75	67.25	67.18	66.97	66.49	66.56	66.72	66.73	67.85	69.16	69.64	69.72	70.20	69.97	69.92	70.19	70.91	70.46	71.07	70.17	68.42
Donetsk Oblast	70.34	70.21	69.63	68.47	67.45	66.54	65.05	65.25	66.20	67.46	67.01	66.05	66.46	66.85	66.76	66.64	66.44	66.73	66.71	66.47	67.65	69.07	69.64	69.74	70.26	Partially occupied by Donetsk People's Republic in 2014							
Zhytomyr Oblast	71.20	70.28	69.48	68.98	68.57	67.74	67.52	67.53	67.53	68.04	67.70	67.69	67.26	67.68	67.37	66.72	66.19	66.42	66.47	66.48	67.77	69.24	69.85	69.74	69.48	69.31	69.61	70.14	70.40	70.08	70.28	69.72	68.21
Zakarpattia Oblast	70.09	69.91	68.92	68.61	68.14	67.90	67.00	67.97	68.41	68.99	68.41	69.05	69.00	69.39	69.25	69.10	68.50	68.42	68.48	68.38	69.17	70.23	70.95	71.03	71.02	71.16	70.66	70.92	71.31	70.99	71.04	70.47	69.45
Zaporizhzhia Oblast	70.57	70.18	69.28	68.50	67.95	67.45	66.32	66.69	67.50	67.85	67.50	67.01	67.12	67.57	67.58	67.87	68.00	68.22	68.26	68.41	69.64	70.53	70.95	71.40	71.63	71.20	71.07	71.26	71.49	71.11	71.39	70.83	68.64
Ivano-Frankivsk Oblast	71.74	71.32	70.06	70.20	69.77	69.82	69.55	69.85	69.83	70.71	70.21	70.27	70.17	70.65	70.36	70.53	70.47	70.48	70.59	70.70	71.67	72.52	73.29	73.38	73.15	73.08	73.18	73.72	73.78	73.67	73.59	72.83	72.03
Kyiv Oblast	71.06	70.09	69.22	68.82	67.96	67.64	66.79	67.23	67.45	68.20	67.80	67.89	67.21	67.67	67.64	67.29	66.79	66.72	66.81	66.98	68.17	69.45	70.12	70.32	70.38	70.01	69.99	70.23	70.46	70.30	70.46	69.72	68.10
Kirovohrad Oblast	69.68	69.47	68.72	68.32	67.48	66.84	66.09	66.35	66.53	67.22	66.67	66.31	66.49	66.86	67.04	67.08	66.67	66.79	67.07	66.87	67.74	69.03	69.38	69.64	69.85	69.61	70.27	70.30	70.50	70.83	71.22	70.11	68.63
Luhansk Oblast	70.38	70.09	69.46	68.09	67.12	66.64	65.67	65.16	66.08	67.57	66.43	65.45	66.39	67.03	67.18	67.10	66.85	67.14	67.54	67.48	68.35	69.58	70.00	70.39	70.77	Partially occupied by Luhansk People's Republic in 2014							
Lviv Oblast	72.15	71.59	70.76	70.56	70.63	70.43	69.70	69.75	69.97	70.90	70.16	70.31	70.44	70.87	70.63	70.67	70.61	70.66	70.70	70.62	71.58	72.57	73.11	73.16	73.28	73.08	73.33	73.55	73.49	73.36	73.45	72.42	71.51
Mykolaiv Oblast	69.60	69.36	68.44	68.22	67.84	66.92	65.78	65.97	66.58	66.90	66.46	65.87	66.03	66.42	66.22	66.21	66.35	66.88	67.08	66.86	67.65	68.71	69.72	70.02	70.08	69.96	70.32	70.67	71.33	71.06	71.32	71.04	69.09
Odesa Oblast	69.07	68.75	67.60	67.62	67.24	66.20	65.22	65.53	66.63	67.30	67.18	66.58	66.38	66.64	66.40	66.47	66.27	66.36	66.66	67.00	68.05	68.95	69.78	70.05	70.37	70.33	70.36	70.83	71.09	70.98	71.35	71.31	69.21
Poltava Oblast	71.31	70.80	70.12	69.18	68.92	68.47	67.80	67.97	68.11	69.03	68.41	68.01	67.66	68.32	68.29	68.26	68.18	68.51	68.62	68.44	69.29	70.38	71.04	71.17	71.10	70.89	71.22	71.33	72.07	71.76	71.92	71.16	70.01
Rivne Oblast	71.95	71.06	70.09	69.11	68.93	68.72	68.13	68.45	68.68	69.26	68.78	68.65	68.88	69.15	69.00	69.02	68.82	68.82	68.99	68.90	69.63	70.76	71.44	71.51	71.38	71.16	71.35	71.56	71.62	71.88	71.99	71.24	69.92
Sumy Oblast	71.22	70.22	69.94	68.99	68.07	67.79	67.42	67.28	67.46	68.37	67.79	67.36	67.46	68.13	68.39	68.21	67.73	68.08	68.56	68.47	69.20	70.36	71.22	71.08	71.02	71.15	71.23	71.68	72.30	72.26	72.43	71.22	70.34
Ternopil Oblast	71.88	71.51	70.58	70.18	70.16	70.06	70.14	70.15	70.05	70.76	70.03	70.82	70.32	70.88	70.94	71.05	70.98	70.86	71.08	71.34	72.04	72.82	73.24	73.36	73.64	73.23	73.35	73.69	73.58	73.39	73.69	73.05	72.11
Kharkiv Oblast	70.77	70.31	69.25	68.94	68.00	67.00	66.31	67.12	67.54	68.61	68.00	67.47	68.14	68.69	68.79	68.72	68.58	68.99	69.20	69.19	70.11	71.20	71.60	71.69	72.14	71.11	71.15	71.46	71.88	71.40	71.84	71.11	68.73
Kherson Oblast	69.22	68.65	67.96	67.69	66.97	66.29	64.76	65.25	66.12	66.29	65.95	65.62	65.69	66.27	66.52	66.94	66.79	66.93	67.16	67.00	67.94	69.28	69.82	69.95	70.00	70.03	69.95	70.16	70.80	70.51	70.77	70.05	68.16
Khmelnytskyi Oblast	71.50	70.90	70.29	69.87	69.00	69.10	68.84	68.69	68.76	69.52	69.46	69.49	69.22	69.56	69.60	69.70	69.24	68.91	68.95	69.21	70.08	71.35	71.96	71.59	71.88	71.73	71.77	72.31	72.18	72.28	72.64	71.80	70.27
Cherkasy Oblast	71.25	70.54	69.59	69.31	68.71	68.28	68.00	67.89	68.36	68.90	68.77	68.34	68.40	68.80	68.78	68.78	68.46	68.62	68.75	68.80	69.85	70.91	71.25	71.25	71.85	71.46	72.04	72.07	72.20	71.78	72.16	71.77	70.57
Chernivtsi Oblast	71.68	70.99	70.16	70.23	70.06	69.70	69.31	69.54	69.77	70.70	70.40	70.74	70.60	70.85	70.62	70.75	70.52	70.54	70.82	70.97	71.83	72.64	72.97	73.05	73.22	73.18	72.96	73.34	73.71	73.83	74.08	72.81	71.27
Chernihiv Oblast	71.60	71.18	69.88	69.42	68.76	67.85	67.06	67.58	67.89	68.37	67.50	67.00	67.16	67.63	67.65	67.37	66.75	66.74	66.75	66.80	67.89	69.21	70.57	70.28	70.37	70.05	70.23	70.65	71.18	70.51	70.68	70.08	68.94
Kyiv	72.19	71.79	70.94	70.38	69.41	68.82	67.53	68.62	69.83	70.74	70.74	70.88	71.23	71.61	71.25	71.46	71.35	71.25	71.27	71.52	72.72	73.66	74.15	74.12	74.39	73.74	74.00	74.21	74.35	74.01	73.96	73.50	71.07
Sevastopol	Special status not established						65.49	67.83	69.53	69.82	69.87	68.99	68.69	69.43	69.70	69.50	68.89	68.76	68.64	68.55	69.67	70.65	71.10	71.81	72.23	Annexed by Russia in 2014							

== Charts ==
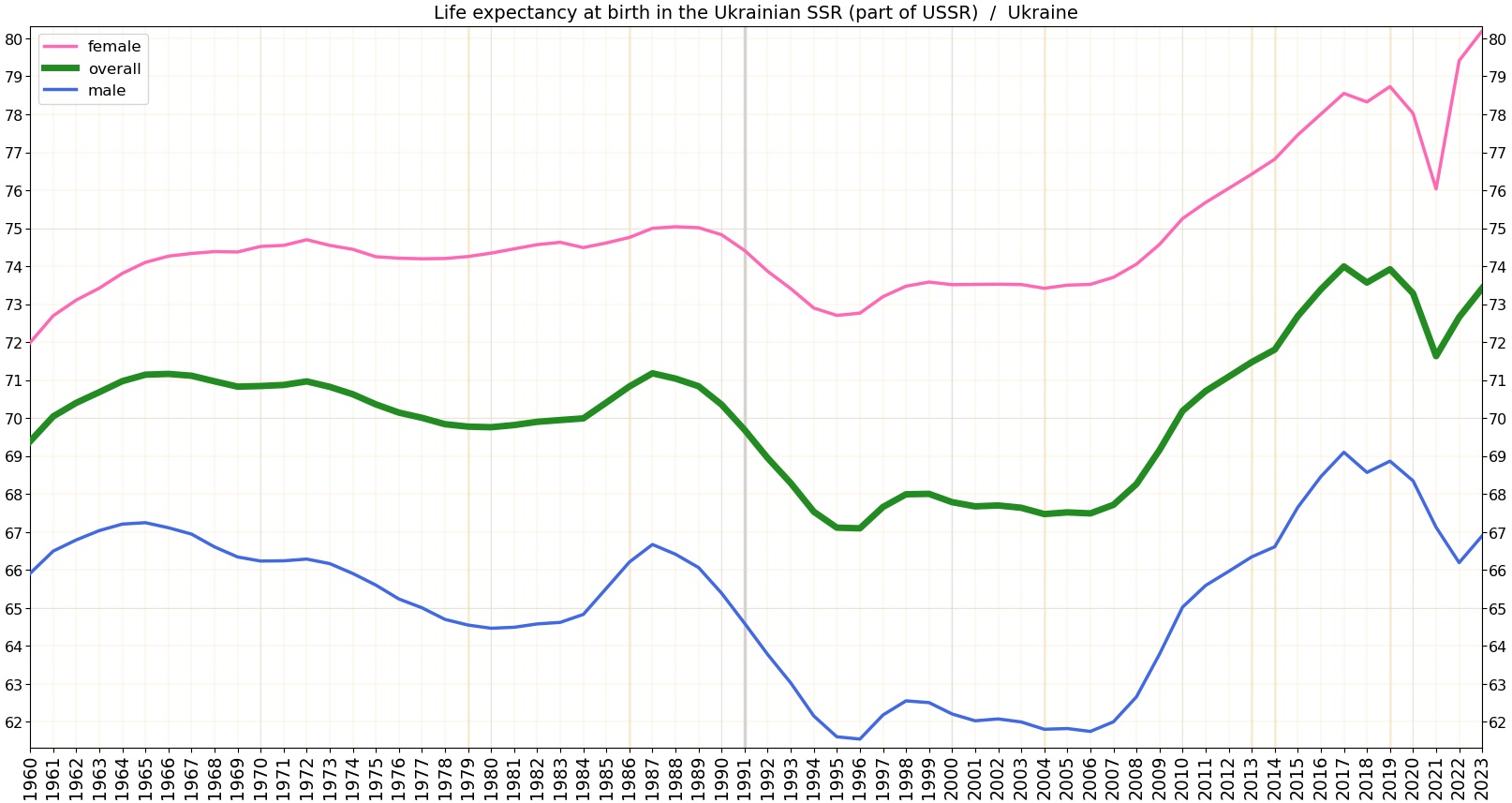
Development of life expectancy in Ukraine according to estimation of the World Bank Group

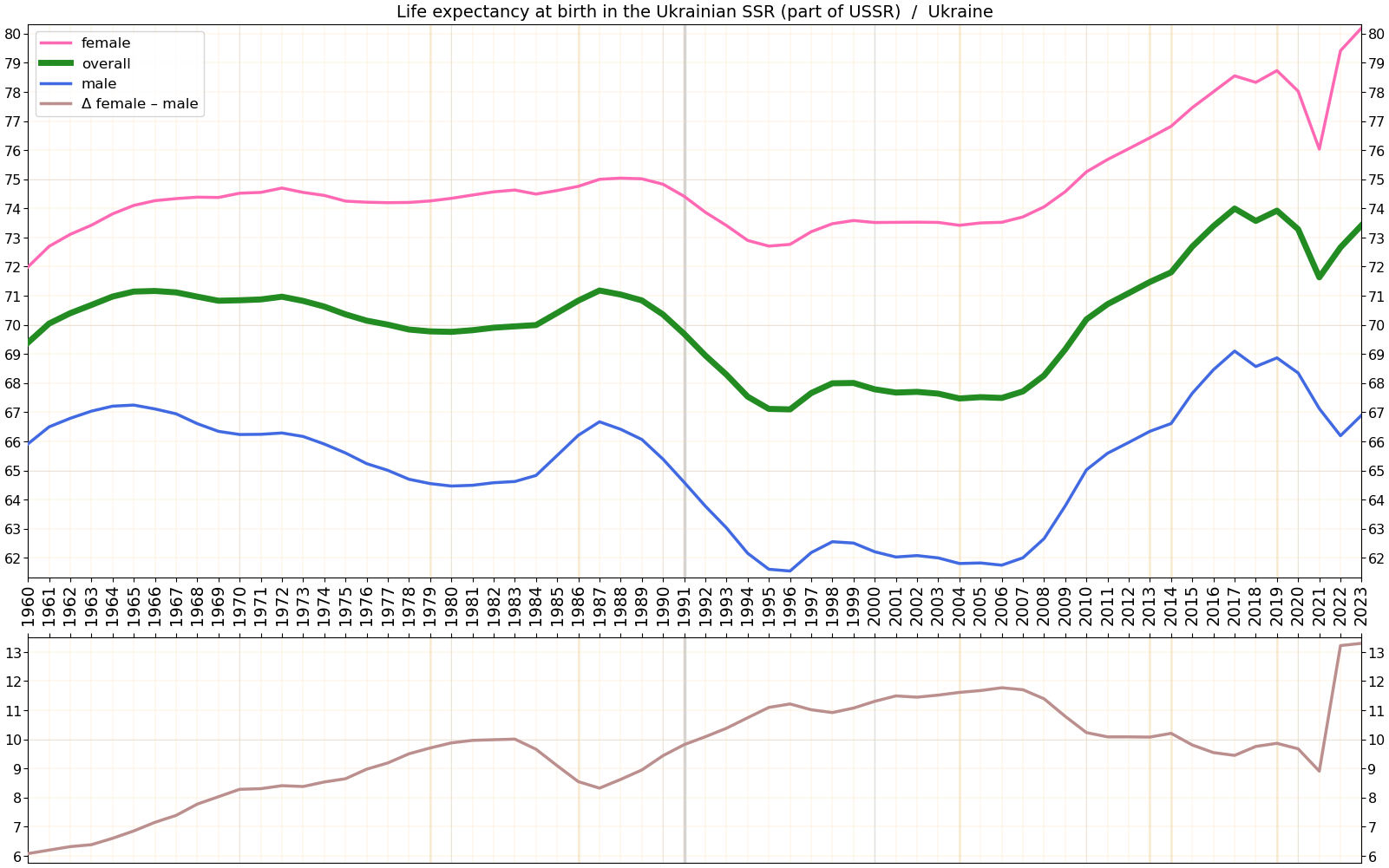
Life expectancy with calculated sex gap

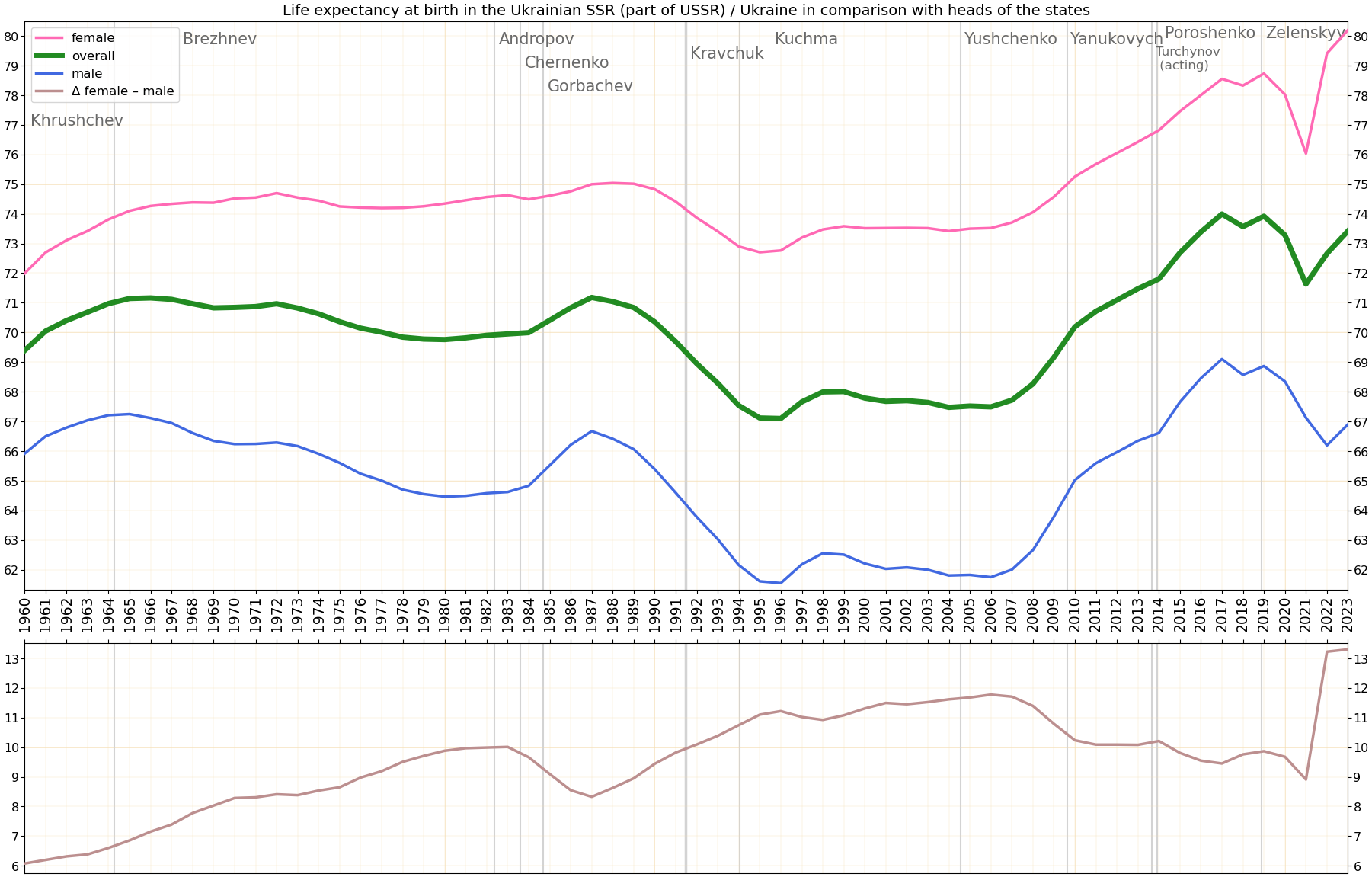
Life expectancy in comparison to presidents of the country

Life expectancy in Ukraine according to estimation of Our World in Data

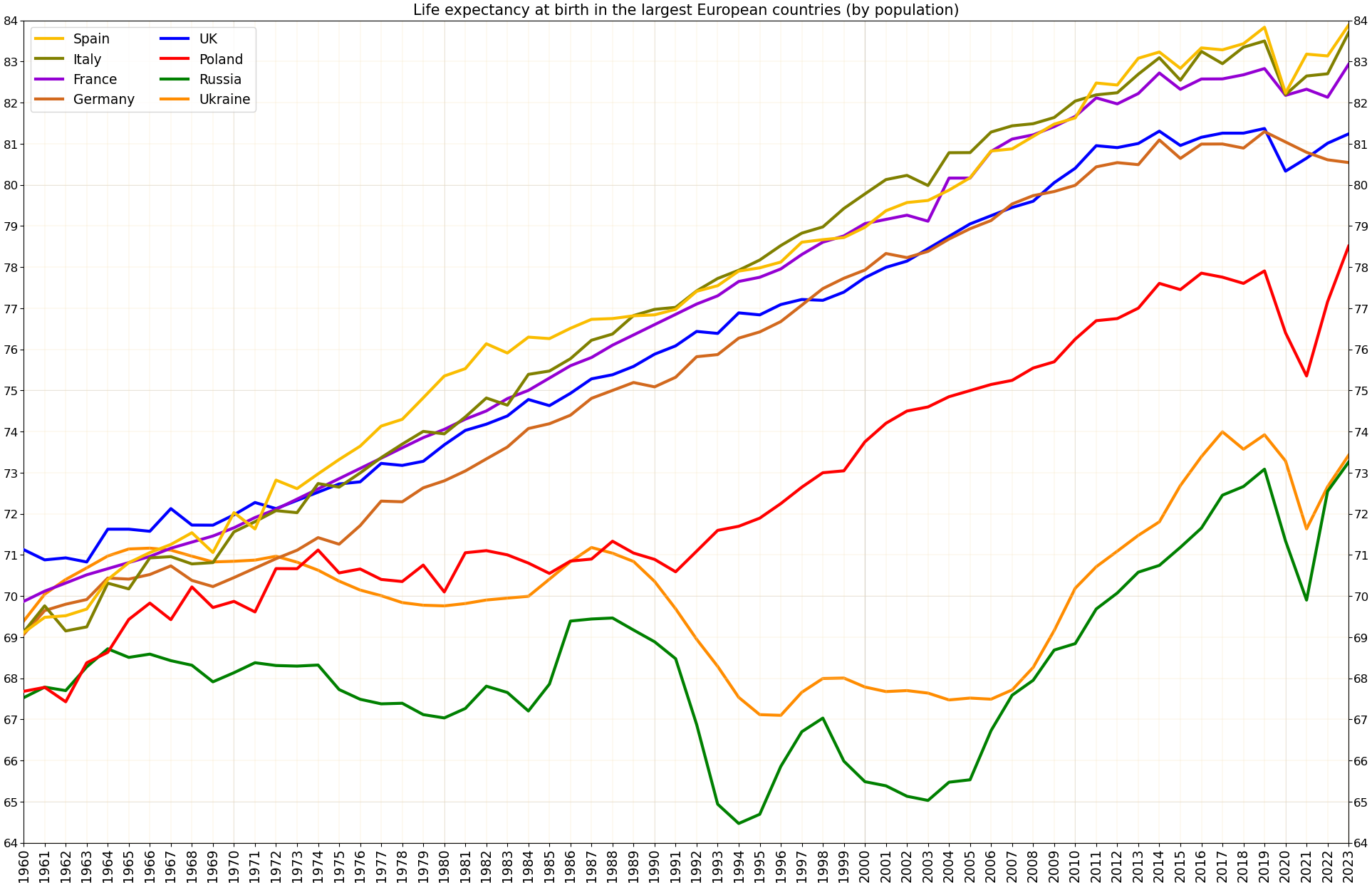
Development of life expectancy in Ukraine in comparison to the largest by population European countries

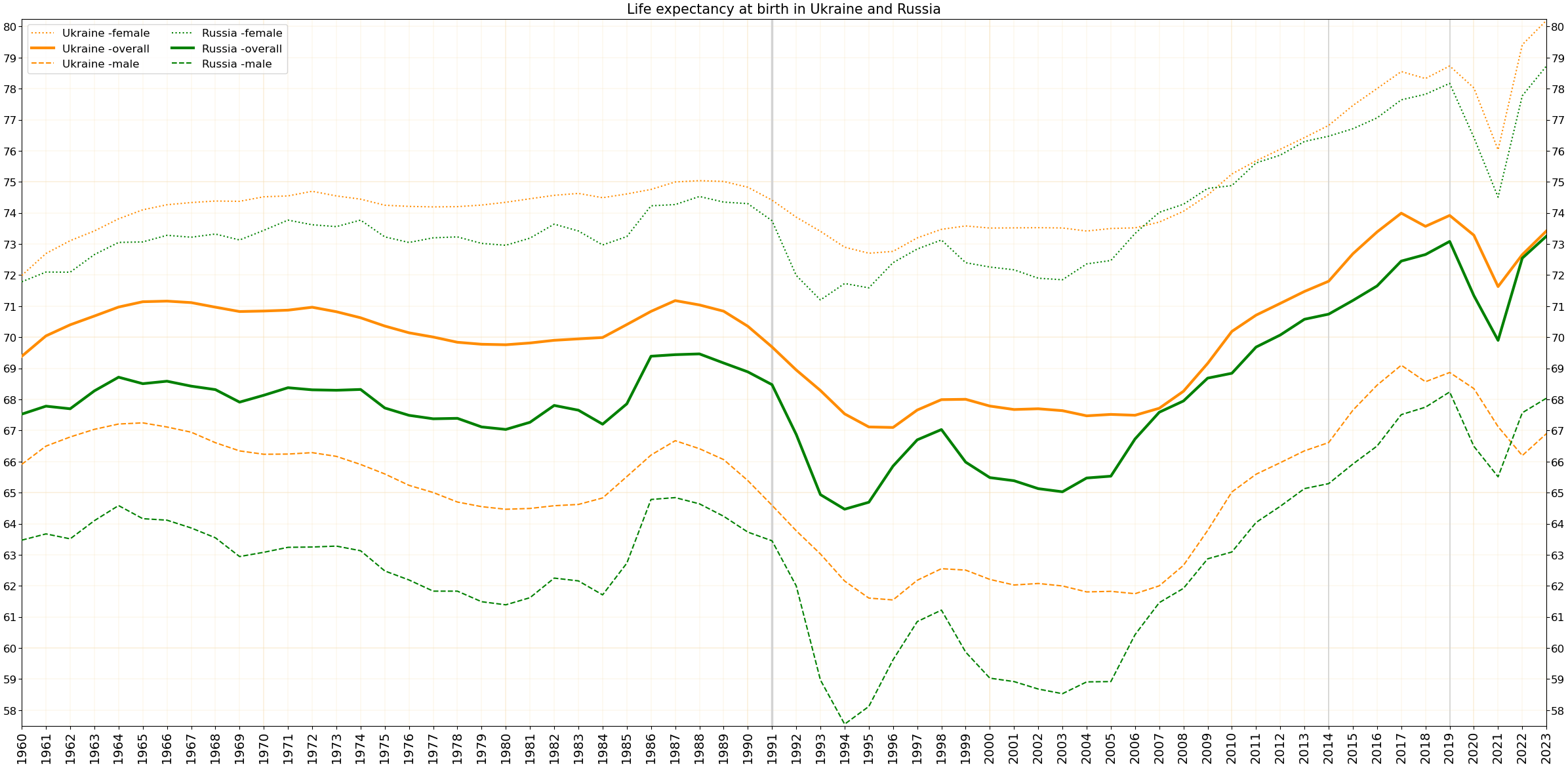
Comparison of life expectancy in Ukraine and Russia
from the World Bank Group

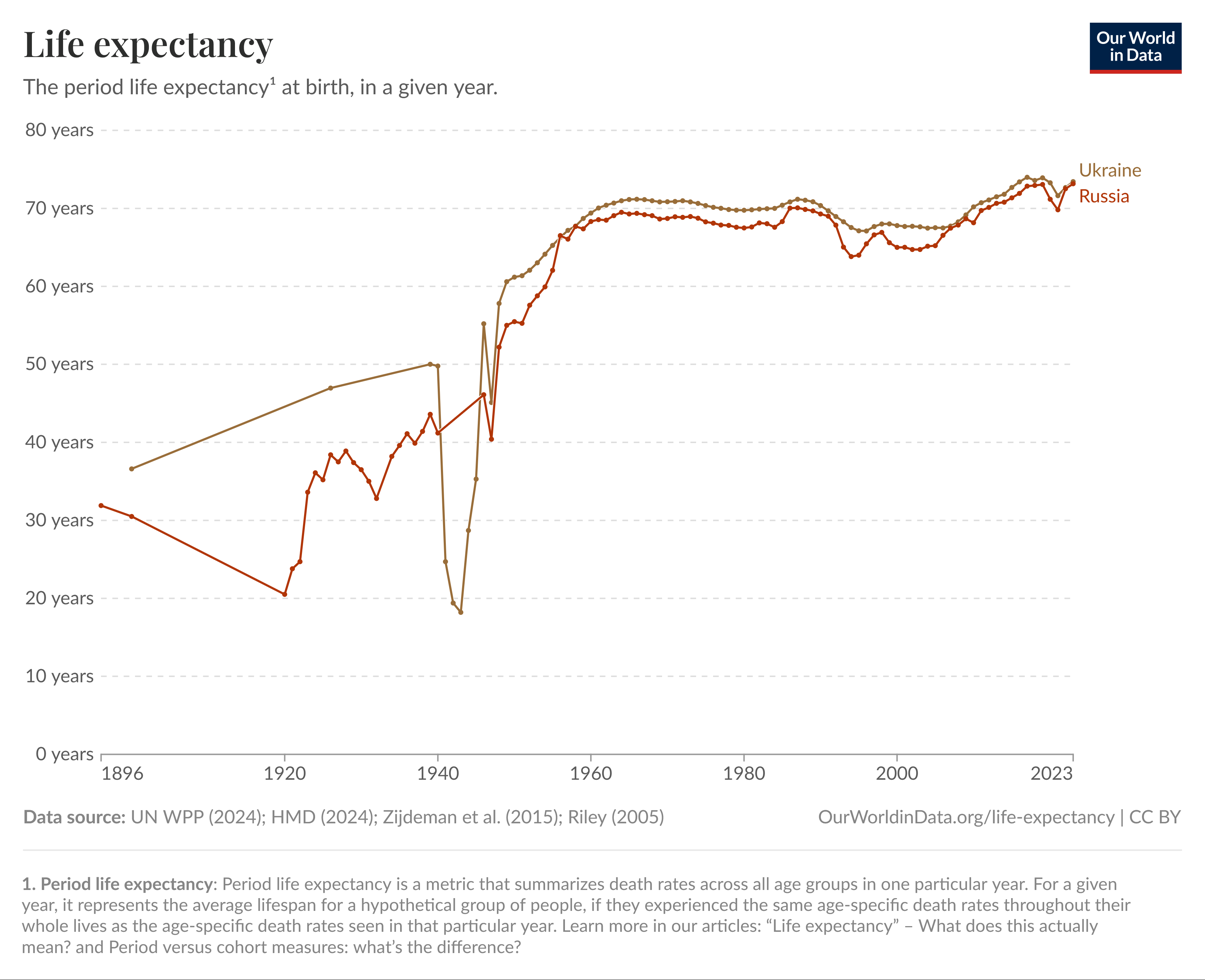
Alternative comparison of life expectancy in Ukraine and Russia
from Our World in Data
Life expectancy and healthy life expectancy in Ukraine on the background of other countries of the world in 2019

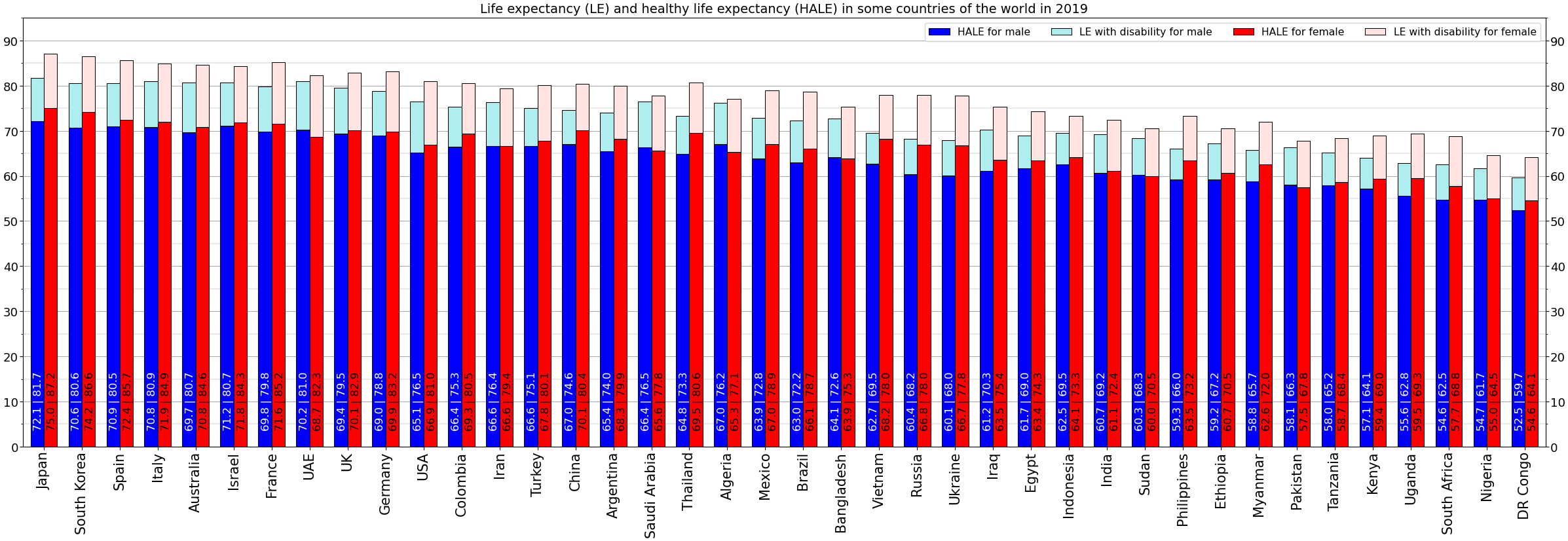
Life expectancy and healthy life expectancy for males and females separately
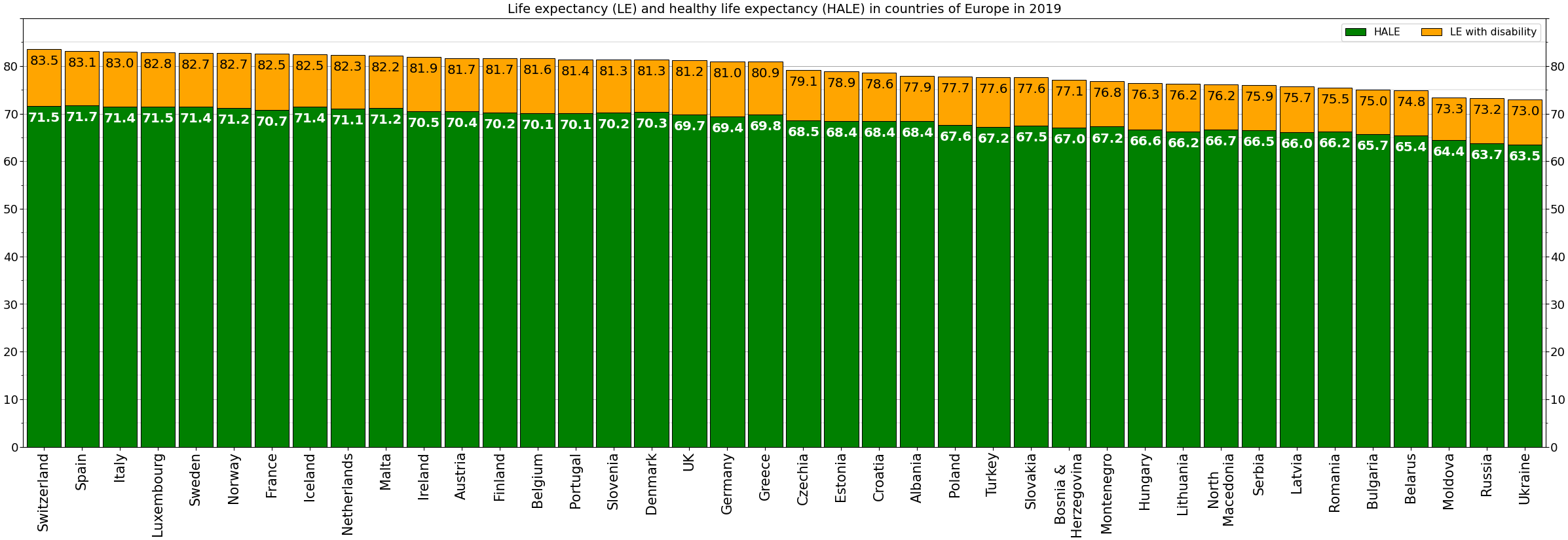
Life expectancy and healthy life expectancy in Ukraine on the background of other countries of Europe in 2019

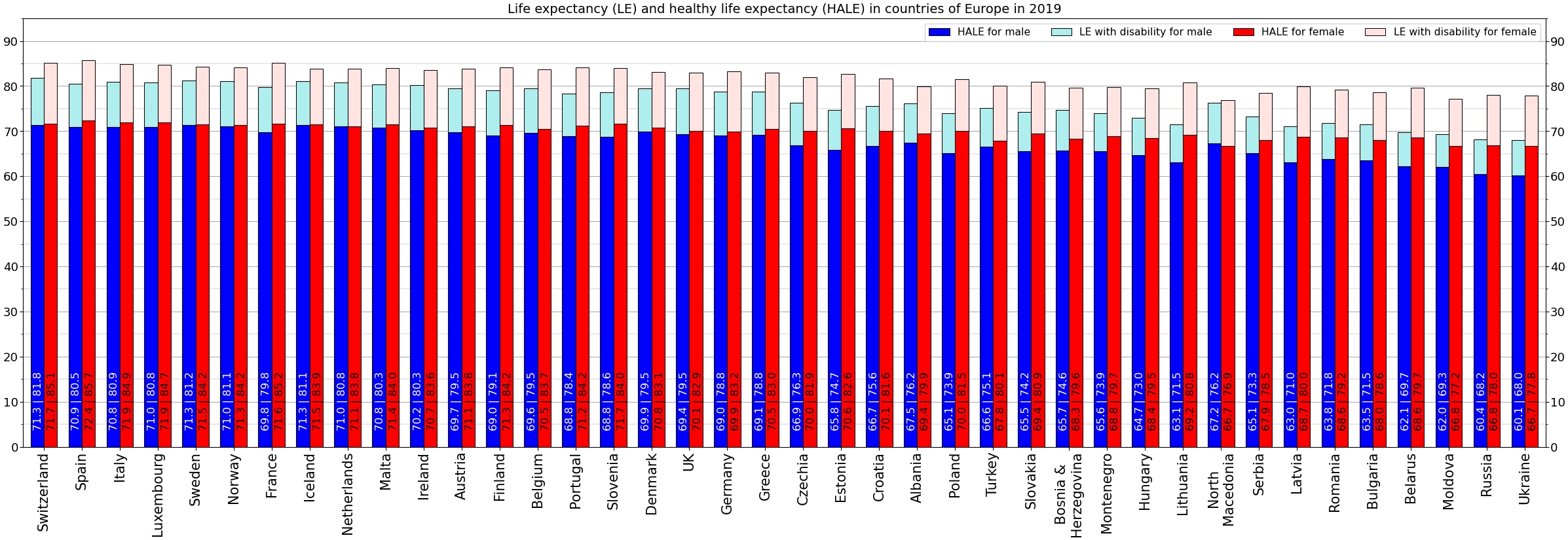
Life expectancy and healthy life expectancy for males and females separately

== See also ==
- Demographics of Ukraine
- Ukrainians
- Administrative divisions of Ukraine
