= Inauguration of Volodymyr Zelenskyy =

2019 Ukrainian presidential inauguration

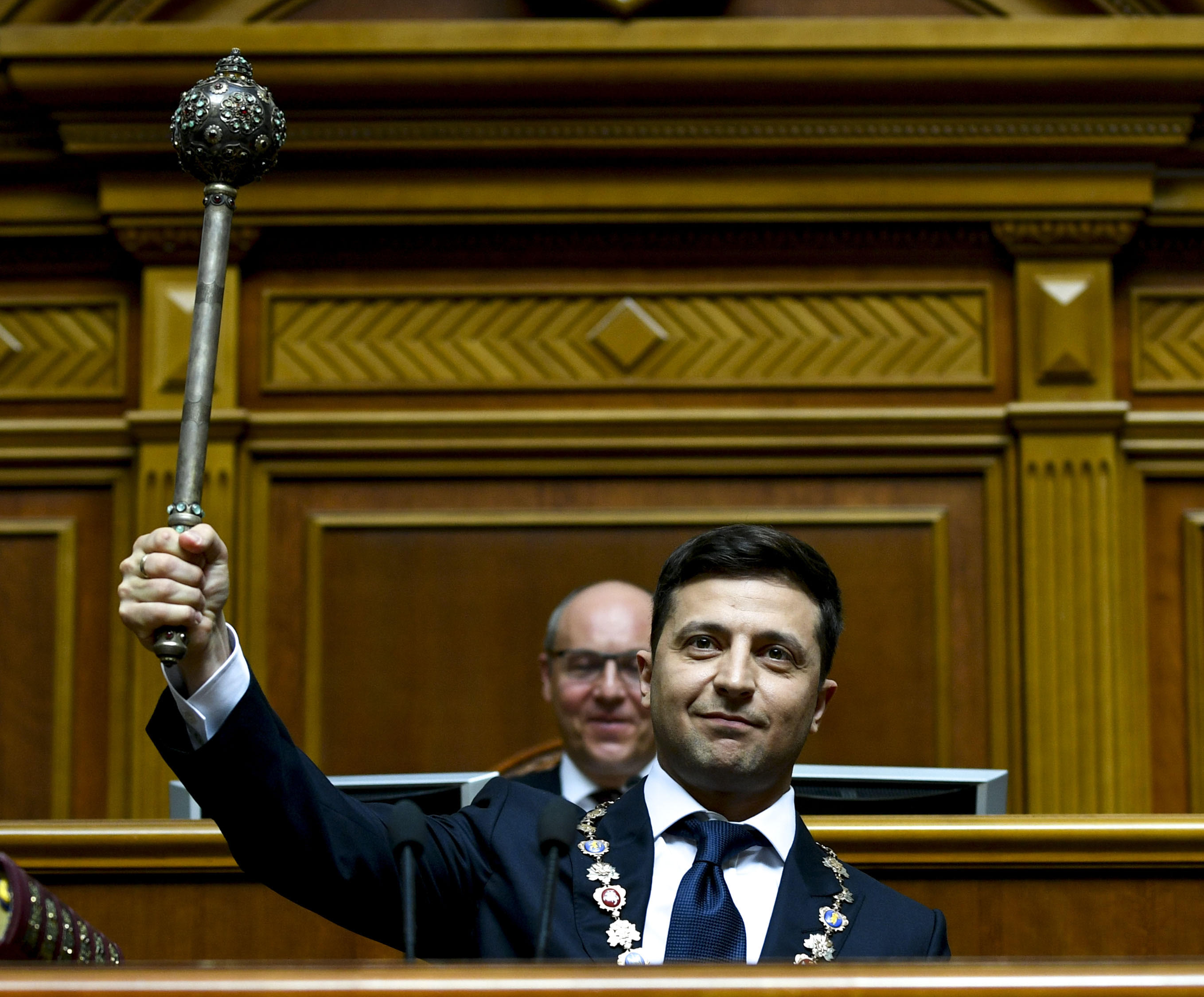
- Zelenskyy during the inauguration, wearing the collar and wielding the bulava of the President of Ukraine
- Date: 20 May 2019; 7 years ago
- Venue: Verkhovna Rada, Kyiv, Ukraine
- Participants: Volodymyr Zelenskyy

On 20 May 2019, Volodymyr Zelenskyy was inaugurated as the sixth president of Ukraine, commencing his first and currently only term, which is still ongoing due to the 2022 Russian invasion of Ukraine. During his inaugural speech, Zelenskyy announced the dissolution of parliament, leading to the 2019 Ukrainian parliamentary election.

== Background ==
Results of the second round of the 2019 Ukrainian presidential election: Volodymyr Zelenskyy Petro Poroshenko

Volodymyr Zelenskyy won 73.22% of the vote in the second round of the 2019 Ukrainian presidential election held on 21 April 2019, winning every oblast except Lviv, and unseating his predecessor Petro Poroshenko in the biggest landslide in the history of Ukrainian presidential elections.

Zelenskyy had no political experience before the election; he had been a major celebrity, popular entertainer, and co-founder of the entertainment company Kvartal 95 Studio. At age 41 in 2019, he became the youngest president in Ukraine's history, as well as the first Jewish president of Ukraine.

=== Date ===
Zelenskyy's political party, Servant of the People, was new and not represented in parliament (the Verkhovna Rada) at the time of his election. Zelenskyy wished to call snap parliamentary elections soon after his landslide presidential victory.

The Central Election Commission (CEC) announced the final election results on 30 April, nine days after the second round, although the preliminary results had been announced and Poroshenko had conceded on the election day itself. On 25 April, Zelenskyy accused the CEC of intentionally delaying the official results so that his inauguration would be held after 27 May, in order to prevent him from dissolving parliament and calling new elections, which the president cannot do within six months of the end of the parliament's term. The CEC denied the accusations, said they were working "unprecedentedly fast", and stated that they were obliged to announce the results by 1 May.

On 4 May, Zelenskyy called for his inauguration to be held on 19 May; he wrote a letter to speaker Andriy Parubiy and met parliamentary faction representatives to discuss the date. Ukrainian Institute of National Memory head Volodymyr Viatrovych criticised this because it was the Day of Mourning for Victims of Political Repression, while some members of parliament called for 28 May because it was a day after the deadline for dissolving parliament. On 10 May, Zelenskyy released a video again calling for him to be inaugurated on 19 May, accusing parliament of delaying his inauguration, and criticising Poroshenko's actions in the lame duck period; Poroshenko denied accusations of delaying Zelenskyy's inauguration.

Biographers of Zelenskyy wrote that the existing parties in parliament tried to postpone Zelenskyy's inauguration until after 27 May to prevent him from calling snap parliamentary elections. On 14 May, parliament was meant to decide Zelenskyy's inauguration date, but the meeting was postponed, to Zelenskyy's outrage. Various proposals were submitted, such as 17 May, 19 May, 20 May, 26 May, 28 May, and 1 June. On 16 May, parliament set Zelenskyy's inauguration date for 10 am on 20 May.

On 17 May, the People's Front party of Arseniy Yatsenyuk withdrew from the government coalition, which was seen as another attempt to block Zelenskyy from dissolving parliament by triggering a provision giving parliament 30 days to form a new coalition, during which time the president cannot dissolve the parliament. In response, Zelenskyy argued that the governing coalition had not actually held a majority since 2016.

== Inauguration ==
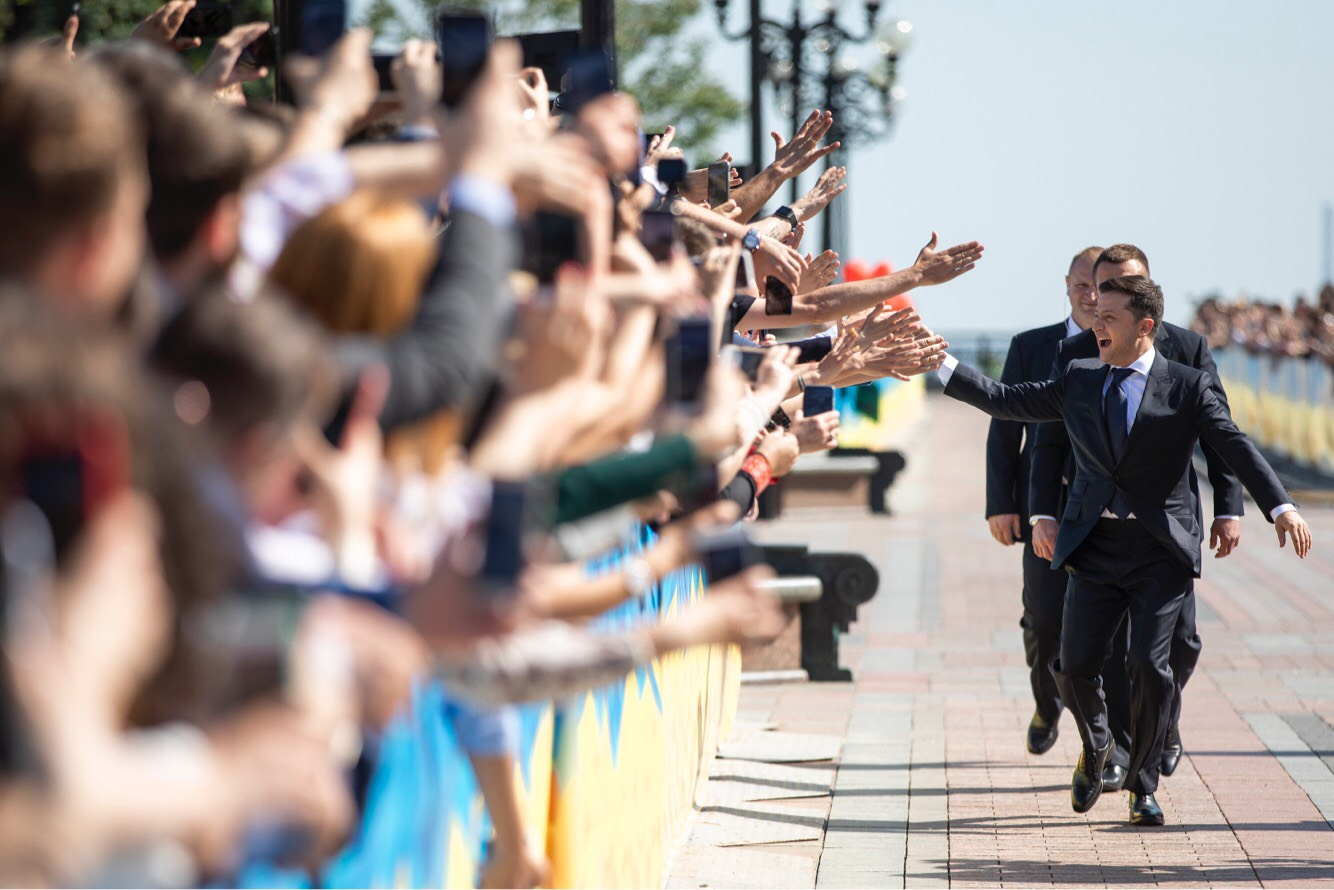
Zelenskyy high-fiving the crowd on the way to his inauguration

On the morning of 20 May, Zelenskyy walked to the ceremony in the Verkhovna Rada from his apartment, high-fiving and taking selfies with crowds of cheering supporters on the way. His friends from his comedy troupe Kvartal 95 were also in the crowd, including his best friend Yevhen Koshovyi, whom Zelenskyy jumped up to kiss on the head.

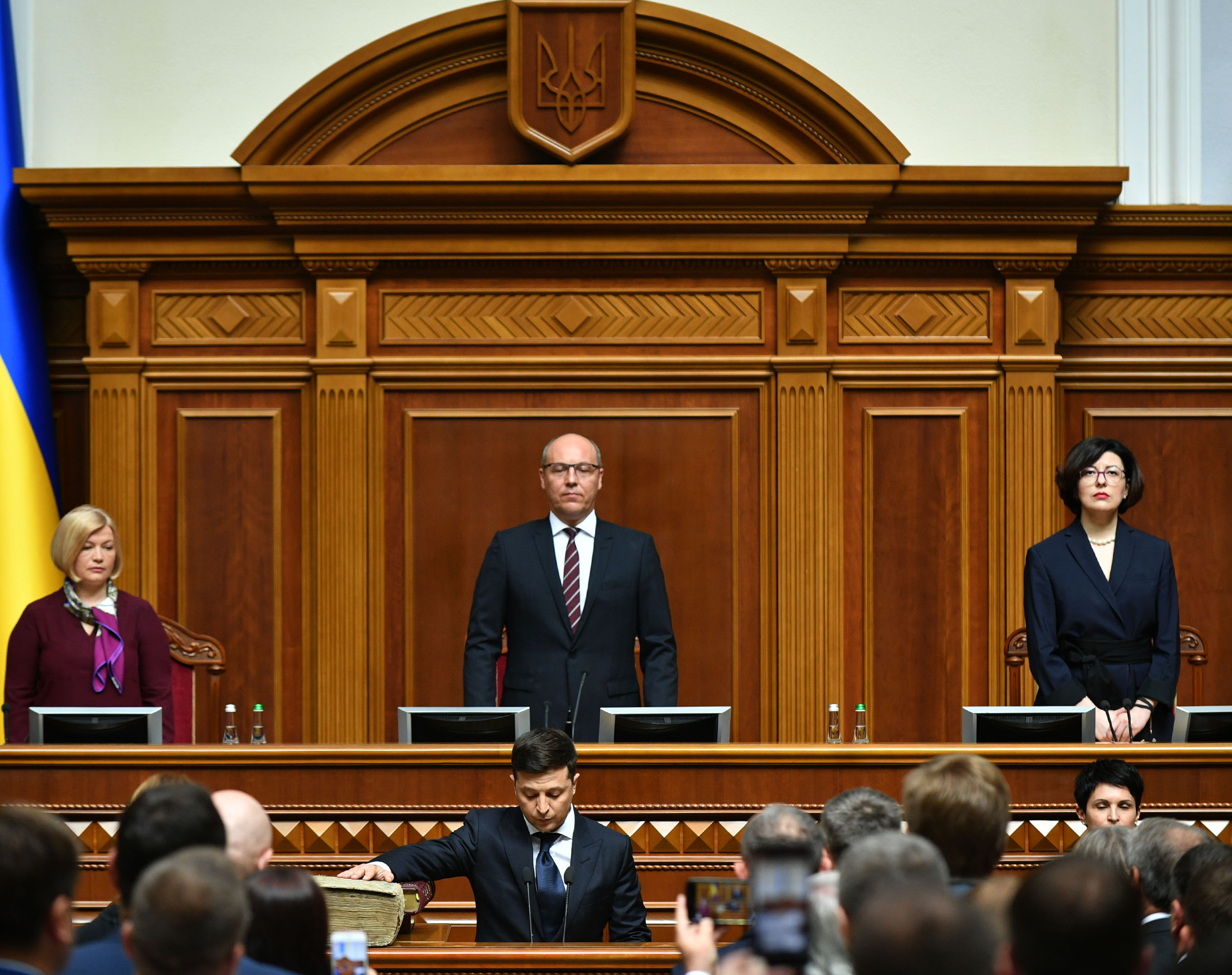
Zelenskyy with his hand on the Constitution of Ukraine and the Peresopnytsia Gospel

The ceremony formally began at 10 am, and the national anthem was sung. The chairperson of the Central Election Commission read out the election results, and the chairperson of the Constitutional Court affirmed that there were no legal obstacles to Zelenskyy taking office. Zelenskyy took the oath of office with his hand on the Constitution of Ukraine and the Peresopnytsia Gospel. He was presented with presidential symbols including the collar, bulava, and seal of the President of Ukraine, as well as the certificate of his presidency.

The inauguration was attended by various foreign leaders and officials, such as Salome Zourabichvili (Georgia), Kersti Kaljulaid (Estonia), Raimonds Vējonis (Latvia), Dalia Grybauskaitė (Lithuania), János Áder (Hungary), Maroš Šefčovič (European Union), and Rick Perry (United States). Zelenskyy's predecessors Leonid Kravchuk, Leonid Kuchma, Viktor Yushchenko, and Petro Poroshenko also attended—every former Ukrainian president except Viktor Yanukovych, who had fled to Russia following the 2014 Revolution of Dignity. Zelenskyy's parents Rymma Zelenska and Oleksandr Zelenskyy and his wife Olena Zelenska were also present for the ceremony.

=== Speech ===
This is our common dream. But we also share a common pain. Each of us has died in the Donbas. Every day we lose each one of us. And each of us is a refugee—the one who has lost his own home and the one who has opened the door of his home, sharing the pain. And each of us is a migrant worker—the one who couldn't find himself at home, but has found income in a foreign country, and the one who struggling with poverty, is forced to lose his own dignity.
But we will overcome all of this! Because each of us is a Ukrainian.

— Volodymyr Zelenskyy

In his speech, Zelenskyy said "each of us is the President", including all Ukrainians and not only the 73% who had voted for him; he said that all Ukrainians were responsible for the future of Ukraine. He said Ukraine had chosen a "path to Europe", and said that while that was Ukrainians' "common dream", Ukrainians also shared a "common pain", namely the pain of refugees, migrant workers, and those killed in Donbas.

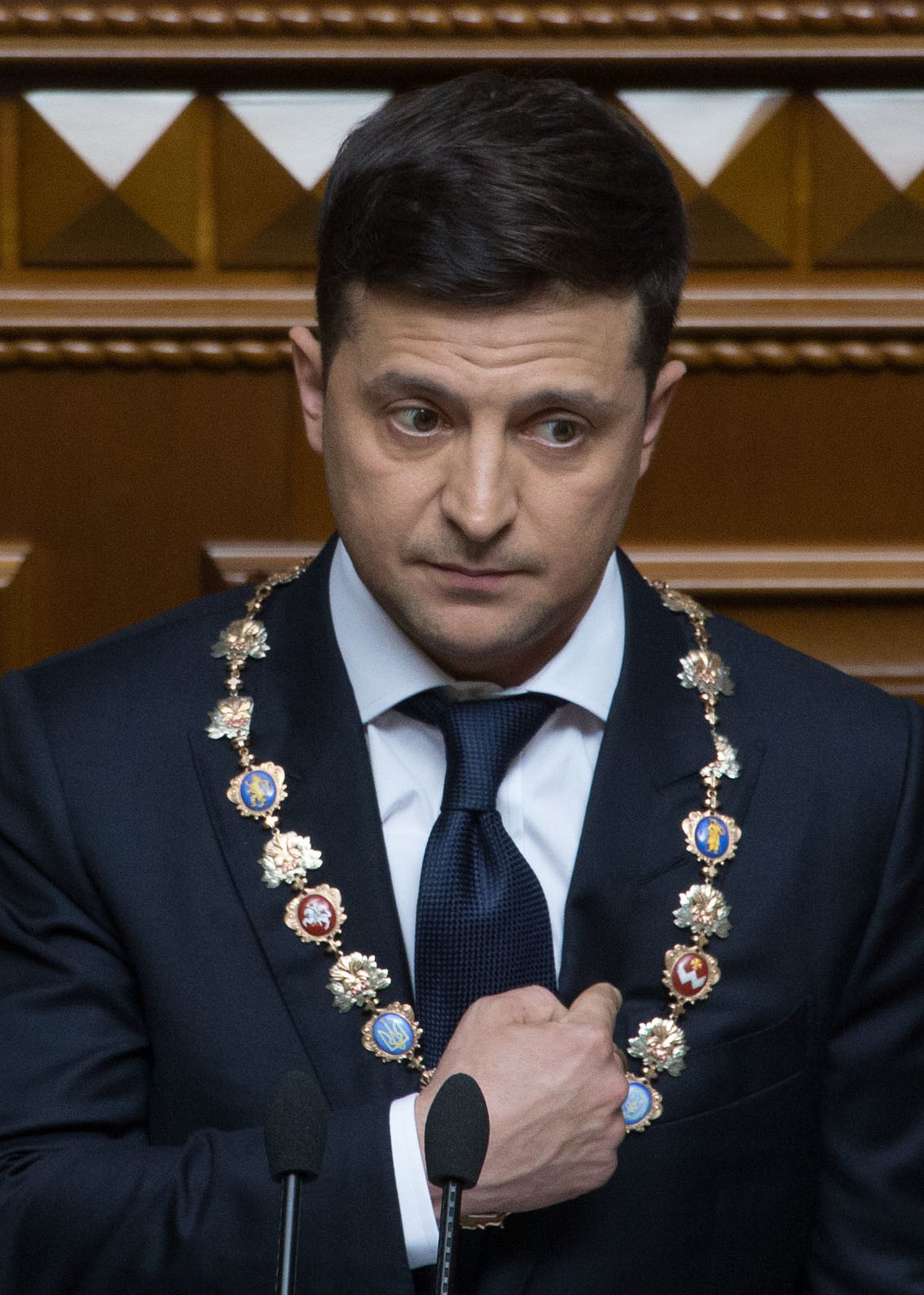
Zelenskyy at the podium

Zelenskyy called on all Ukrainians to unite, saying "there are no bigger or lesser, or correct or incorrect Ukrainians. From Uzhgorod to Luhansk, from Chernihiv to Simferopol, in Lviv, Kharkiv, Donetsk, Dnipro and Odesa—we are Ukrainians." He also appealed to Ukrainians around the world to "return home", and offered Ukrainian citizenship to "all who are ready to build a new, strong and successful Ukraine".

Zelenskyy said his first task would be a ceasefire in Donbas, and said he was willing to pay "any price" to stop Ukrainian deaths, including losing his popularity and presidency, but he would not give up Ukrainian territory. He said "history is unfair" because Ukraine did not start the war, but would have to end it. He also addressed the challenge of recovering occupied territory, particularly the need to win back the minds of people living there; he said previous governments had not done anything to make those people feel Ukrainian, and said being Ukrainian was not "a line in the passport", but was in one's heart. He switched to Russian for some sentences in this part of his speech, leading Oleh Liashko to shout an interruption; Zelenskyy responded sarcastically by thanking Liashko for "dividing the nation".

Zelenskyy noted that both Ukrainian- and Russian-speakers were defending Ukraine in the army, and spoke about the need to respect the army and to improve conditions for soldiers. He also spoke about economic and infrastructure problems in Ukraine. He quoted Ronald Reagan: "The government does not solve our problems. The government is our problem", and called on the government to resign rather than "[shrugging] and [saying] 'There is nothing we can do'".

Zelenskyy said his election as president proved that Ukrainians were tired of corrupt establishment politicians. He told officials not to idolise him, saying "I really do not want my pictures in your offices, for the President is not an icon, an idol or a portrait. Hang your kids' photos instead, and look at them each time you are making a decision."

Zelenskyy called on members of parliament to approve a law revoking parliamentary immunity, a law establishing criminal liability for illegal enrichment, and reforms to the Electoral Code of Ukraine. He also called on them to dismiss the head of the Security Service of Ukraine, as well as the Prosecutor General and Minister of Defense. He said they would have "two months" to do this, and then announced that he was dissolving the eighth Verkhovna Rada, leading to the 2019 Ukrainian parliamentary election. (He issued the decree for this the next day.)

Finally, Zelenskyy ended his speech with a reference to his entertainment career: "Dear Nation! All my life I tried to do all I could so that Ukrainians laughed. That was my mission. Now I will do all I can so that Ukrainians at least do not cry any more."

Zelenskyy's inaugural speech has been described as "fiery" and "a declaration of war on the Rada and the established political class". He later included an abridged version of this speech in the A Message from Ukraine collection of speeches that he published in 2022, after the 2022 Russian invasion of Ukraine.

== See also ==
- Ukrainian presidential inauguration
