= Seal of the president =

The seal of the president or presidential seal is a symbol often used to represent and authenticate documents coming from the president:

- Seal of the president of Bangladesh, see President of Bangladesh
- Seal of the president of Ireland
- Seal of the president of Nigeria
- Seal of the president of the Philippines
- Seal of the president of the Republic of China, see President of the Republic of China
- Presidential Seal of Turkey
- Seal of the president of Ukraine
- Seal of the president of the United States
