= List of presidents of Ukraine =

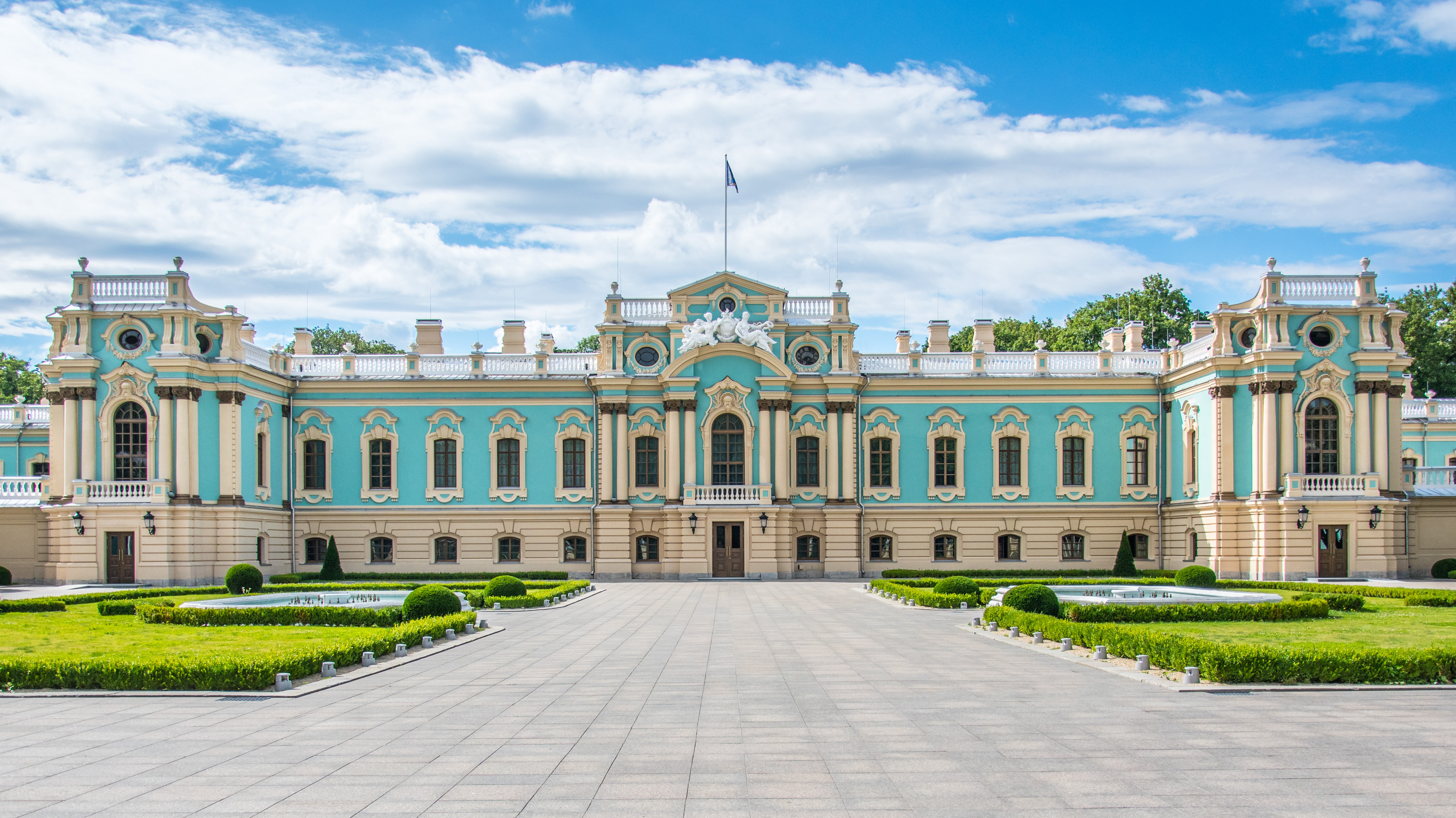
The Mariinskyi Palace, official residence of the president of Ukraine, in July 2018

The president of Ukraine is the head of state of Ukraine, directly elected to a five-year term by voting eligible citizens of Ukraine. The officeholder leads the executive branch of the government and is the commander-in-chief of the Armed Forces of Ukraine. The current office was formed when the Verkhovna Rada of the Ukrainian Soviet Socialist Republic passed a law on 5 July 1991 establishing the office of the "President of the Ukrainian Soviet Socialist Republic." Upon the declaration of Ukrainian independence from the Soviet Union on 24 August 1991, the title was changed to "President of Ukraine". The first presidential election held on 1 December 1991 was won by Leonid Kravchuk.

Every president of Ukraine except for Volodymyr Zelenskyy has been a People's Deputy of the Verkhovna Rada prior to their election, with Kuchma, Yushchenko, and Yanukovych all previously serving as Prime Minister and Kravchuk as well as acting president Turchynov previously serving as Chairman of the Verkhovna Rada. Kravchuk was the first president to resign from the office, following a power struggle with Prime Minister Leonid Kuchma. After the 2014 Ukrainian revolution, Viktor Yanukovych abandoned the office and fled the country. He was subsequently impeached and temporarily replaced by Chairman of the Verkhovna Rada Oleksandr Turchynov; the chairman serves as acting president when the office is vacant. Early presidential elections were held on 25 May 2014 and won by Petro Poroshenko; Poroshenko was inaugurated as the fifth president on 7 June 2014. On 18 June 2015, Yanukovych was officially deprived of the title of President of Ukraine. The sixth and current president is Volodymyr Zelenskyy, who defeated Poroshenko in the 2019 presidential election and was inaugurated on 20 May 2019.

== List ==
List of presidents of Ukraine since 1991.
No.	Portrait	Name (Birth–Death)	Term dates	Term length	Party (Note: Reflects the president's political party at the start of their presidency. Changes during their time in office are noted.)	Elections	Cabinets
1	Photo of Leonid Kravchuk in 1991	Leonid Kravchuk; Леонід Кравчук (1934–2022)	5 December 1991 (Note: Although Leonid Kravchuk's official inauguration ceremony was conducted on 5 December 1991, he carried out most of the presidential responsibilities temporarily ceded to him as Chairman of the Verkhovna Rada from 24 August 1991 until 5 December 1991, when he became President of Ukraine in his own right. He had previously served as Chairman of the Supreme Soviet of the Ukrainian SSR since 23 July 1990.) – 19 July 1994	2 years, 226 days	Independent	1991	Fokin (1990–92)
1	Photo of Leonid Kravchuk in 1991	Leonid Kravchuk; Леонід Кравчук (1934–2022)	5 December 1991 – 19 July 1994	2 years, 226 days	Independent	1991	Kuchma (1992–93)
2	Photo of Leonid Kuchma in 2001	Leonid Kuchma; Леонід Кучма (born 1938)	19 July 1994 – 23 January 2005	10 years, 188 days	Independent	1994; 1999	Masol II (1994–95)
2	Photo of Leonid Kuchma in 2001	Leonid Kuchma; Леонід Кучма (born 1938)	19 July 1994 – 23 January 2005	10 years, 188 days	Independent	1994; 1999	Marchuk (1995–96)
2	Photo of Leonid Kuchma in 2001	Leonid Kuchma; Леонід Кучма (born 1938)	19 July 1994 – 23 January 2005	10 years, 188 days	Independent	1994; 1999	Lazarenko (1996–97)
2	Photo of Leonid Kuchma in 2001	Leonid Kuchma; Леонід Кучма (born 1938)	19 July 1994 – 23 January 2005	10 years, 188 days	Independent	1994; 1999	Pustovoitenko (1997–99)
2	Photo of Leonid Kuchma in 2001	Leonid Kuchma; Леонід Кучма (born 1938)	19 July 1994 – 23 January 2005	10 years, 188 days	Independent	1994; 1999	Yushchenko (1999–2001)
2	Photo of Leonid Kuchma in 2001	Leonid Kuchma; Леонід Кучма (born 1938)	19 July 1994 – 23 January 2005	10 years, 188 days	Independent	1994; 1999	Kinakh (2001–02)
2	Photo of Leonid Kuchma in 2001	Leonid Kuchma; Леонід Кучма (born 1938)	19 July 1994 – 23 January 2005	10 years, 188 days	Independent	1994; 1999	Yanukovych I (2002–04)
3	Official portrait of Viktor Yushchenko in 2008	Viktor Yushchenko; Віктор Ющенко (born 1954)	23 January 2005 – 25 February 2010	5 years, 33 days	Our Ukraine	2004	Tymoshenko I (2005)
3	Official portrait of Viktor Yushchenko in 2008	Viktor Yushchenko; Віктор Ющенко (born 1954)	23 January 2005 – 25 February 2010	5 years, 33 days	Our Ukraine	2004	Yekhanurov (2005–06)
3	Official portrait of Viktor Yushchenko in 2008	Viktor Yushchenko; Віктор Ющенко (born 1954)	23 January 2005 – 25 February 2010	5 years, 33 days	Our Ukraine	2004	Yanukovych II (2006–07)
3	Official portrait of Viktor Yushchenko in 2008	Viktor Yushchenko; Віктор Ющенко (born 1954)	23 January 2005 – 25 February 2010	5 years, 33 days	Our Ukraine	2004	Tymoshenko II (2007–10)
4	Official portrait of Viktor Yanukovych in 2010	Viktor Yanukovych; Віктор Янукович (born 1950)	25 February 2010 – 22 February 2014	3 years, 362 days	Party of Regions	2010	Azarov I (2010–12)
4	Official portrait of Viktor Yanukovych in 2010	Viktor Yanukovych; Віктор Янукович (born 1950)	25 February 2010 – 22 February 2014	3 years, 362 days	Party of Regions	2010	Azarov II (2012–14)
— (Note: Turchynov was appointed acting president (Note: "In the event of the pre-term termination of authority of the President of Ukraine in accordance with Articles 108, 109, 110 and 111 of this Constitution, the execution of duties of the President of Ukraine, for the period pending the elections and the assumption of office of the new President of Ukraine, shall be vested in the Chairperson of the Verkhovna Rada of Ukraine." —Constitution of Ukraine, Article 112.) after Yanukovych's removal from office by parliamentary vote.)	Photo of Oleksandr Turchynov in 2014	Oleksandr Turchynov; Олександр Турчинов (born 1964)	23 February 2014 – 7 June 2014	104 days	Fatherland	—	Yatsenyuk I (2014)
5	Official portrait of Petro Poroshenko in 2014	Petro Poroshenko; Петро Порошенко (born 1965)	7 June 2014 – 20 May 2019	4 years, 347 days	Petro Poroshenko Bloc	2014	Yatsenyuk II (2014–2016)
5	Official portrait of Petro Poroshenko in 2014	Petro Poroshenko; Петро Порошенко (born 1965)	7 June 2014 – 20 May 2019	4 years, 347 days	Petro Poroshenko Bloc	2014	Groysman (2016–2019)
6	Cropped version of official portrait of Volodymyr Zelensky in 2019	Volodymyr Zelenskyy; Володимир Зеленський (born 1978)	20 May 2019 – Incumbent	7 years, 131 days (Note: As of 28 September 2026)	Servant of the People	2019	Honcharuk (2019–2020)
6	Cropped version of official portrait of Volodymyr Zelensky in 2019	Volodymyr Zelenskyy; Володимир Зеленський (born 1978)	20 May 2019 – Incumbent	7 years, 131 days	Servant of the People	2019	Shmyhal (2020–2025)
6	Cropped version of official portrait of Volodymyr Zelensky in 2019	Volodymyr Zelenskyy; Володимир Зеленський (born 1978)	20 May 2019 – Incumbent	7 years, 131 days	Servant of the People	2019	Svyrydenko (2025–2026)
6	Cropped version of official portrait of Volodymyr Zelensky in 2019	Volodymyr Zelenskyy; Володимир Зеленський (born 1978)	20 May 2019 – Incumbent	7 years, 131 days	Servant of the People	2019	Koretskyi (2026–present)

== Social poll rankings ==
Social poll rankings of presidents of Ukraine since 1991.
No.	Name	Party	Poll year		Aggr.
No.	Name	Party	2020	2021	Aggr.
1	Leonid Kravchuk	Independent	3	5	4
2	Leonid Kuchma	Independent	1	1	1
3	Viktor Yushchenko	Our Ukraine	6	6	6
4	Viktor Yanukovych	Party of Regions	5	4	5
5	Petro Poroshenko	Petro Poroshenko Bloc	4	3	3
6	Volodymyr Zelenskyy	Servant of the People	2	2	2

== See also ==
- First Lady of Ukraine
- List of prime ministers of Ukraine, since 1917
- List of chairmen of the Verkhovna Rada, since 1938
- President of Ukraine (in exile) — Head of the UPR government in exile from 1921 to 1992
- List of leaders of Ukraine
