= Bulava of the President of Ukraine =

Ceremonial mace of the President of Ukraine

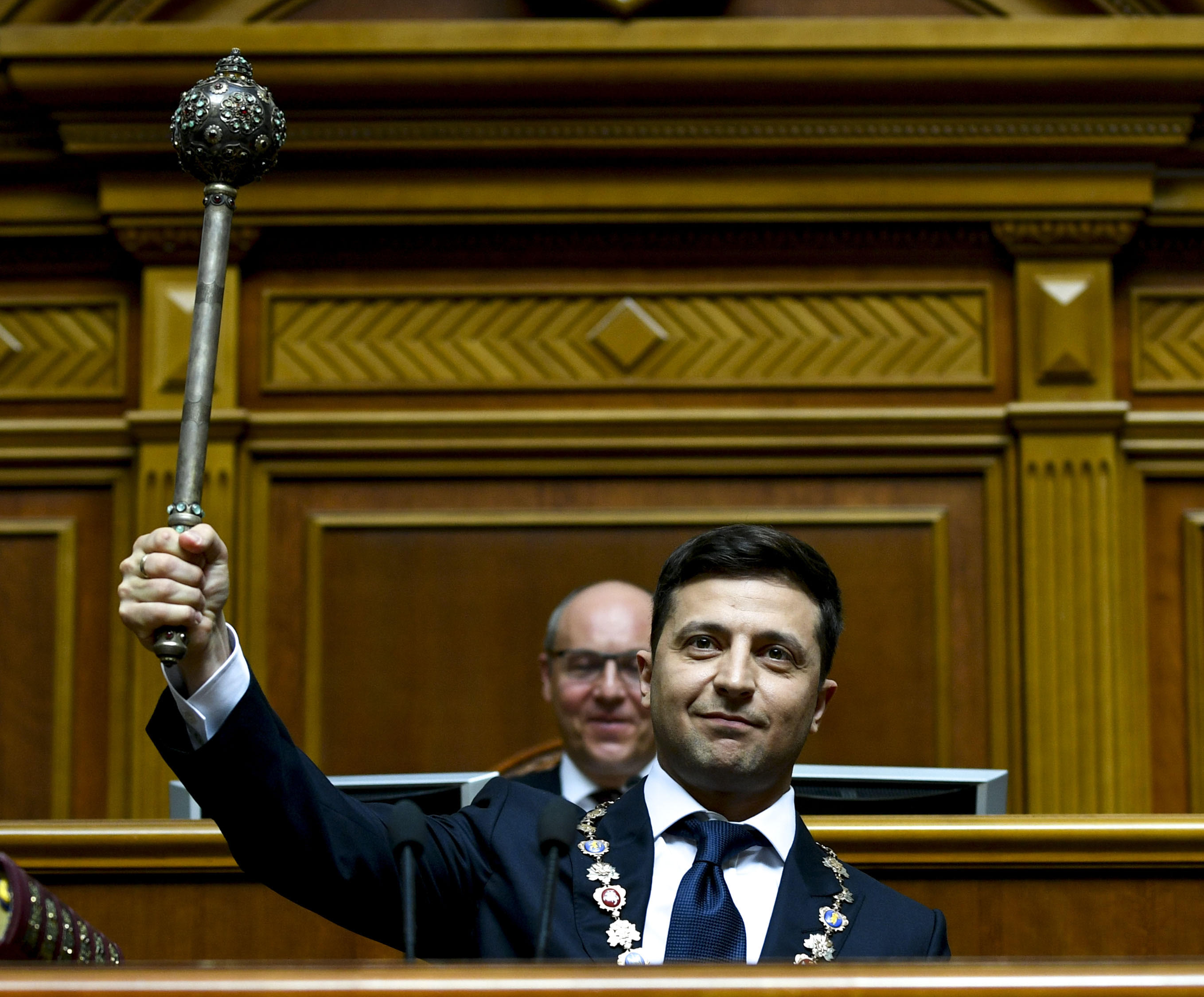
The bulava in the hand of Volodymyr Zelenskyy during his inauguration in 2019

The presidential bulava (mace; Ukrainian: Булава Президента України, romanized: Bulava Prezydenta Ukrainy) is one of the official symbols of the President of Ukraine.

The mace of the president of Ukraine testifies to the continuity of centuries-old historical traditions of Ukrainian statehood—ceremonial maces were signs of power of Ukrainian hetmans, Kish otamans of the Zaporozhian Sich and registered Cossack colonels.

== Description ==

The presidential bulava is made of gold-plated gilded silver and fitted with a total of 64 emeralds and garnets, mounted in gold. It contains a three-edged Damascus steel blade bearing the Latin phrase "Omnia revertitur", ("Everything returns"). The blade can be extracted from the mace by means of a button decorated with a Yakut emerald.

The whole bulava weighs 750 grams and consists of two hollowed parts: the handle, and the top, called the "apple". The "apple" is decorated with gold ornamental medallions, and crowned with a gold stylised wreath decorated with enamelled stones.

The bulava is kept in a mahogany case, decorated with a golden relief image of the Ukrainian coat of arms. The lodgement is made of purple velvet. Initially, a lock was placed on the case, but this was replaced by a gilded figure of a guardian angel to allow its easy opening during ceremonies.

== See also ==
- Bulava
- State symbols of the President of Ukraine
