= Collar of the President of Ukraine =

National symbol of Ukraine

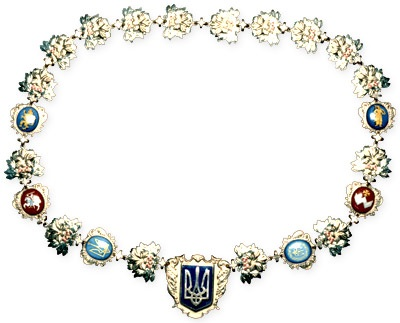

The sign (collar) of the president of Ukraine weighs about 400 grams.

== Overview ==
The president's collar is not obligatory, but most European heads of state have such a decoration: for instance, the president's collar (male jewelry like a female necklace) is one of the symbols of state power in Bulgaria and Poland. Some countries grant another collar to the new head of the state, and the previous one passes to the national museums. An open-work chain with a historical relic – an amulet which, as the legend reads, belonged to Ukrainian Hetman Ivan Mazepa – was among the attributes of the President of Ukraine in exile.

The collar is made of white and yellow gold. Kyiv artists have painted its seven medallions. They represent miniatures of the royal symbol of Vladimir the Great, the coat of arms of the Kingdom of Galicia–Volhynia and that of the Grand Duchy of Lithuania, "The Cossack with Musket" sign, Hetman Bohdan Khmelnytsky's patrimonial Syrokomla coat of arms and the Ukrainian People's Republic's coat of arms as the first attempt to establish independent Ukraine in the 20th century. The painted medallions alternate with jewelry ones: above laurel wreathes of white gold there are guelder rose leaves of yellow gold gemmed with 96 garnets, each one and a half millimeters.

Both the seal and the collar are kept in leather cases with the velvet lodgement and the imprinted image of the lesser coat of arms of Ukraine.

== See also ==
• State symbols of the President of Ukraine
