= Seal of the President of Ukraine =

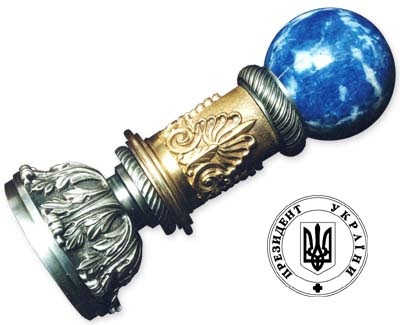
Presidential seal

The official Seal of the President of Ukraine (Ukrainian: Печатка Президента України, Pečatka Prezydenta Ukrajiny) is ring-shaped.

== Overview ==
There is an image of the lesser coat of arms of Ukraine in the center of the stamp hemmed with “The President of Ukraine” inscription. Below the National Emblem is an image of the Order of Prince Yaroslav the Wise. The handle of the new seal is garnished with a lapis lazuli ball. The neck or central part of the seal is gilded; its colors are that of the national flag of Ukraine—blue above and yellow below.

The seal is made of silver and weighs next to half a kilogram. Kyiv jeweler Mykhailo Cheburakhin made it using sketches by Oleksiy Rudenko just for a week. The seal with the inscription "Government of the Ukrainian People's Republic in Exile" was kept by the president in exile—M. Plavyuk—and after the declaration of independence was handed over to the popularly elected President of Ukraine, Leonid Kravchuk.

== See also ==
• State symbols of the President of Ukraine
