= State symbols of the President of Ukraine =

National symbols of the Ukrainian president

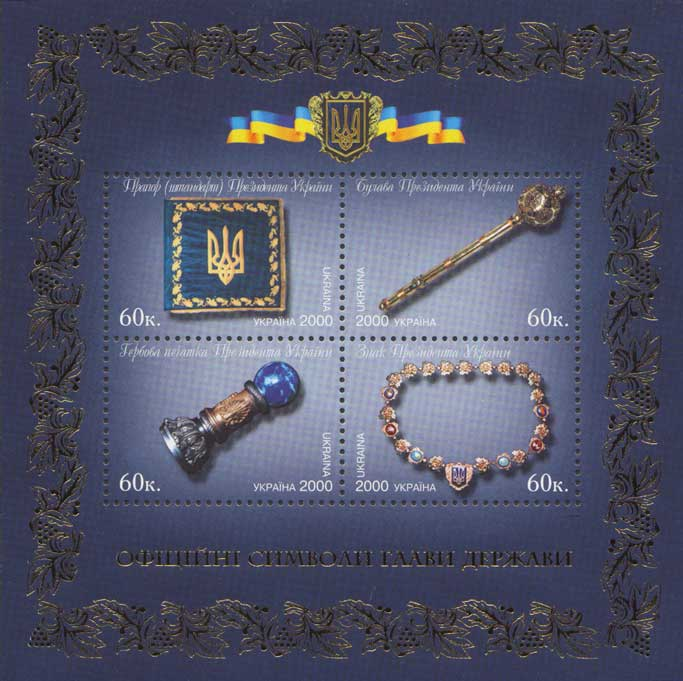
State symbols of the President of Ukraine on 2000 stamps

The official symbols of the head of state (Ukrainian: Oфіційні символи глави держави, romanized: Ofitsiini symvoly hlavy derzhavy) are the state insignia of the President of Ukraine. Pursuant to presidential decree of November 29, 1999, they include four items: colour (standard), collar, bulawa and official seal. Some of the items of the set are adopted from the Cossack regalia (Kleinodien) that once were accepted from the King of Poland Stefan Batory.

== Standard ==
The standard of the president of Ukraine is a square royal blue banner, featuring a tryzub, bordered by gold ornament and external fringe of the same colour. The staff is wooden with a round onyx top decorated with an embossed lay-on yellow ornament.

== Collar ==
The collar represents a chained badge, which consists of a pendant locket, six enameled medallions and twelve decorative links in a special order. All of its elements are joined by shaped rings.

== Bulava ==
The presidential bulava (mace) is made of gold-plated silver and its case from mahogany, decorated with an embossed picture of the minor state coat of arms. The handle and the top of the bulawa feature a decorative ornament and precious stones. The mace symbolizes the continuity of centuries-old traditions of Ukrainian state development.

== Seal ==
The round presidential seal bears the minor state coat of arms in the centre, around which there is a circular inscription "President of Ukraine". Under the minor coat of arms there is a stylized symbol of the Order of Yaroslav the Wise. The presidential seal is used to certify the signature of Ukrainian president on official documents, certificates of presidential awards and honorary titles of the country, as well as presidential messages to the heads of other states.
