= People's Committee to Protect Ukraine =

People's Committee to Protect Ukraine Народний комітет захисту України Narodnyi komitet zakhystu Ukrainy
- Founded: May 10, 2010
- Headquarters: Kyiv
- International affiliation: None
- Colours: Light blue

The People's Committee to Protect Ukraine (Ukrainian: Народний комітет захисту України, romanized: Narodnyi komitet zakhystu Ukrainy) was a political movement in Ukraine formed May 2010. The committee intended to hold a mass protest campaign in Ukraine against the policies of President Viktor Yanukovych, who ultimately fled amid violence in 2014.

== History ==
On May 10, 2010 nine political parties and several non-governmental organizations signed a document on the creation of the committee:

- Ukrainian Social-Democratic Party
- European Party of Ukraine
- All-Ukrainian Union "Fatherland"
- People's Movement of Ukraine (Rukh)
- Motherland Defenders Party
- Reforms and Order Party
- People's Self-Defence Party
- All-Ukrainian Union "Freedom"
- Ukrainian Party

The parties Ukrainian Republican Party Assembly, Our Ukraine, Ukrainian Platform, Ukraine Cathedral and All-Ukrainian Public Organization Civil Position intended to make a decision about joining the committee.

One of the initiators of the committee is writer Dmytro Pavlychko. Present at the opening signing of the committee were among others: Yulia Tymoshenko, Borys Tarasyuk and Levko Lukyanenko. Although they were invited, and also in opposition to President Viktor Yanukovych, former President Viktor Yushchenko and former presidential candidate Arseniy Yatsenyuk were not present and did not publicly comment about the committee.

After the first rally of the movement (near the Verkhovna Rada building on May 11, 2010) opposition supporters complained of being hassled by the police in an attempt to limit the number of participants in the rally. According to the police buses were only stopped because companies didn't have permits to travel in convoys or if buses were in bad technical shape. Ukrainian Minister of Internal Affairs Anatolii Mohyliov stated on May 13, 2010 “The law allows rallies but bans street barricades and loud shouts”.

Mykola Tomenko, member of Yulia Tymoshenko Bloc, predicted on May 11, 2010 opposition rallies would get bigger and louder in the near future.

On 8 August 2011 All-Ukrainian Union "Fatherland", Rukh, European Party of Ukraine, People's Self-Defense, Reforms and Order Party, Motherland Defenders Party, Civil Position and Front for Change formed the Dictatorship Resistance Committee "to better coordinate our efforts".

== Goals ==
The organisation saw as its main tasks:

- Protection of the territorial integrity of the state
- Protection of the rights and freedoms of citizens
- The cessation of "anti-Ukrainian humanitarian policies"
- Rejection of any attempts to establish foreign monitoring over strategic enterprises and sectors of Ukrainian industry
- Preservation of the Euro-Atlantic choice of Ukraine
- Move forward towards civilized European values

=== Declaration of the People's Committee to Protect Ukraine ===
On the May 10, 2010 the committee released the following opening statement:

On the May 10, 2010, we, representatives of political parties and civil organizations have created People's Committee to Protect Ukraine.

Taking into account the danger of losing the statehood and democratic freedoms by Ukrainian population in results of actions of Yanukovych's regime we announce the consolidation of all forces to coordinate the actions in order to protect Ukraine.

In the conditions of widely spread attacks of the Yanukovych's regime onto the live-important national interest of Ukraine the first task of the Committee is to organize all-Ukrainian opposition movement to:

- protect the sovereignty and territorial integrity of Ukraine;
- protect the main freedoms and political rights;
- stop anti-Ukrainian policy in Ukraine and protect Ukrainian identity;
- stop any efforts to impose the foreign control over strategically important factories and sections of Ukrainian industry;
- hold the Euro-Atlantic choice of Ukraine and keep orientation onto European values.

Our actions will be carried out in accordance with the rights and freedoms defined by the Constitution of Ukraine, will be open for equal rights partnership to protect Ukraine.

== Authorities' response ==
In early May 2010, Prime Minister Mykola Azarov called the ideas of the committee "hysterical and hopeless". Meanwhile, one of the members of Party of Regions Valeriy Konovalyuk stated that "the committee is unlikely to receive support from the population".

== See also ==
- Politics of Ukraine
- History of Ukraine
- Ukraine without Kuchma
