= Vasyl Onopenko =

Ukrainian judge and politician

- Василь Онопенко
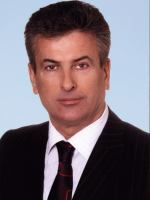
- Official portrait, 2006

Chairman of the Supreme Court of Ukraine
- In office 2 October 2006 – 29 September 2011
- President: Viktor Yushchenko
- Preceded by: Vasyl Malyarenko
- Succeeded by: Petro Pylypchuk

People's Deputy of Ukraine
- In office 12 May 1998 – 5 October 2006
- Constituency: SDPU(o), No. 3 (1998–2002); Yulia Tymoshenko Bloc, No. 4 (2002–2006)

Minister of Justice
- In office 27 October 1992 – 7 August 1995
- President: Leonid Kravchuk; Leonid Kuchma
- Prime Minister: Leonid Kuchma; Vitaliy Masol
- Preceded by: Volodymyr Kampo
- Succeeded by: Serhiy Holovatyi

Personal details
- Born: 10 April 1949 (age 77) Velyki Kryshlentsi, Ukrainian SSR, Soviet Union (now Ukraine)
- Party: Independent (1998, 2002, since 2012)
- Other political affiliations: Party of Human Rights (1994–1995); Social Democratic Party of Ukraine (united) (1995–1998); Ukrainian Social Democratic Party (1998–2012); Batkivshchyna (1999–2002); Yulia Tymoshenko Bloc (2002–2006)
- Education: Kharkiv Law Institute
- Occupation: Jurist, politician

Vasyl Vasylovych Onopenko (Ukrainian: Василь Васильович Онопенко; born 10 April 1949) is a Ukrainian judge and politician who served as chairman of the Supreme Court of Ukraine from 2006 to 2011. Prior to this, he served as a People's Deputy of Ukraine from 1998 to 2006, as Minister of Justice from 1992 to 1995, and as a judge of the Supreme Court of Ukraine within the Soviet Union from 1985 to 1991.

== Biography ==
Onopenko is from Vinnytsia Oblast. He graduated the Kharkiv Law Institute in 1975 and later a candidate dissertation in 1994. In 1976-1981 Onopenko was a judge of the Lityn Raion court, later in the Chernihiv Oblast court. In 1985-1991 he was a judge of the Supreme Court of Ukraine.

In 1992 he was appointed a Minister of Justice of Ukraine (Kuchma government, Second Masol government). At the post in 1994 Onopenko created own political party, the Party of Human Rights. Sometime in 1995 his party was united with Social Democratic Party of Ukraine and Ukrainian Party of Justice into Social Democratic Party of Ukraine (united). He was elected the chairman of the newly created political party. Due to inadequate investigation of events of July 1995 (related to burial of Volodymyr (Romaniuk)), in August 1995 Onopenko resigned.

Soon after being elected to the Verkhovna Rada (Ukrainian parliament) in 1998, Onopenko was excluded from SDPU(u) and created yet another party, the Ukrainian Social Democratic Party. Onopenko joined the independent group in the Verkhovna Rada and then Batkivshchyna. In the 1999 Ukrainian presidential election, he unsuccessfully ran for the presidency.

During the 2002 Ukrainian parliamentary election Onopenko returned to the Verkhovna Rada as the fourth candidate on the party list of the Yulia Tymoshenko Bloc. Soon after being elected, for a short time he was unaffiliated, but then rejoined the parliamentary faction.

For the 2006 Ukrainian parliamentary election he was again 4th on the party list of the Yulia Tymoshenko Bloc. Later Onopenko resigned as a People's Deputy of Ukraine after being elected to chairman of the Supreme Court of Ukraine. At the end of 2006 his son-in-law replaced him as a leader of the Ukrainian Social Democratic Party.

Onopenko quit the Ukrainian Social Democratic Party after Natalia Korolevska changed it to Ukraine – Forward! in 2012.

In the 2012 Ukrainian parliamentary election, Onopenko was an unsuccessful independent candidate for People's Deputy of Ukraine in Ukraine's 14th electoral district.

Government offices
Preceded by Volodymyr Kampo	Minister of Justice of Ukraine; 1992–1995	Succeeded by Serhiy Holovatyi
Political offices
New creation	Leader of the Party of Human Rights; 1994–1995	Party was merged
Preceded by Yuriy Buzduhan as Leader of merged party	Leader of the Social Democratic Party of Ukraine (united); 1995–1998	Succeeded by Viktor Medvedchuk
New title	Leader of the Ukrainian Social Democratic Party; 1998–2006	Succeeded by Yevhen Korniychuk
Court offices
Preceded by Vasyl Malyarenko	Chairperson of the Supreme Court of Ukraine; 2006–2011	Succeeded by Petro Pylypchuk
