= Dictatorship Resistance Committee =

Dictatorship Resistance Committee Комітет опору диктатурі Комитет сопротивления диктатуре
- Founded: August 5, 2011
- Preceded by: Yulia Tymoshenko Bloc
- Headquarters: Lviv
- Ideology: Ukrainian nationalism; Pro-Europeanism; Anti-Yanukovych (before 2014)
- Colours: White

The Dictatorship Resistance Committee (Ukrainian: Комітет опору диктатурі, romanized: Komitet oporu dyktaturi, Russian: Комитет сопротивления диктатуре) is a political alliance in Ukraine formed by several parliamentary factions, political parties and opposition activist groups, initially founded to oppose the former Ukrainian President Viktor Yanukovych. Parliamentary members of the alliance joined the All-Ukrainian Association Fatherland (Batkivshchyna) as an umbrella coalition All-Ukrainian Association Fatherland – United Opposition in the 2012 Ukrainian parliamentary elections.

== History ==
The Dictatorship Resistance Committee was formed in August 2011 and came to join some other opposition alliances that were already active; most parties had joined forces one year earlier in People's Committee to Protect Ukraine. It was especially designed to promote public and civic actions against the conviction of former Ukrainian Prime Minister Yulia Tymoshenko, who was also the leader of one of the member parties.

In late September 2011, Tymoshenko called for the opposition to run the elections on a single-party ticket. In November 2011, the parties of the Dictatorship Resistance Committee chose the candidates who would be on the joint electoral lists for the electoral district ballots in the 2012 Ukrainian parliamentary elections.

== Members ==
By March 2012, the Committee consisted of the following parties:

- All-Ukrainian Union "Fatherland": biggest opposition party led by Yulia Tymoshenko. It was also the principal member of the Yulia Tymoshenko Bloc (BYuT).
- Front for Change: a centrist political party. Until it became a member of the Dictatorship Resistance Committee it had been wary of cooperating with Tymoshenko.
- People's Self-Defense Party: a former member of Viktor Yuschenko's Our Ukraine–People's Self-Defense Bloc (OU-PSDB), this party was led by another alleged political prisoner: former Minister of Internal Affairs Yuriy Lutsenko.
- People's Movement of Ukraine: a conservative party and former member of OU-PSDB.
- European Party of Ukraine: a liberal party and former member of OU-PSDB.
- Reforms and Order Party: a liberal party that was also member of BYuT.
- Motherland Defenders Party: a former member of OU-PSDB.
- All-Ukrainian Union "Svoboda": a far right nationalistic party.

Although UDAR of Vitaliy Klychko did not join the Dictatorship Resistance Committee it signed an agreement on 22 January 2012 on joint actions with the alliance.

=== Withdrawn members ===
- Civil Position: a small party led by former Defence Minister Anatoliy Hrytsenko. It left the alliance in late November 2011 because of other members had voted for the new law on parliamentary elections on 17 November 2011. In the same month of August 2011 in which the alliance was created, it was reported that Civil Position would merge with the European Party of Ukraine soon.
- Ukraine – Forward!; as Ukrainian Social Democratic Party a former member of BYuT. It left the alliance on 14 March 2012 after its party-leader Natalia Korolevska was expelled from the "Bloc Yulia Tymoshenko–Batkivschyna" faction (formerly BYuT faction) in the Verkhovna Rada (Ukrainian parliament).
- Our Ukraine; the former core party of OU-PSDB. The party was excluded from the committee on June 15, 2012, because of a consistent infringements against the decisions of KOD and cooperation with the regime of Yanukovych.
