= Serhiy Sobolyev =

Ukrainian politician

- Сергій Соболєв
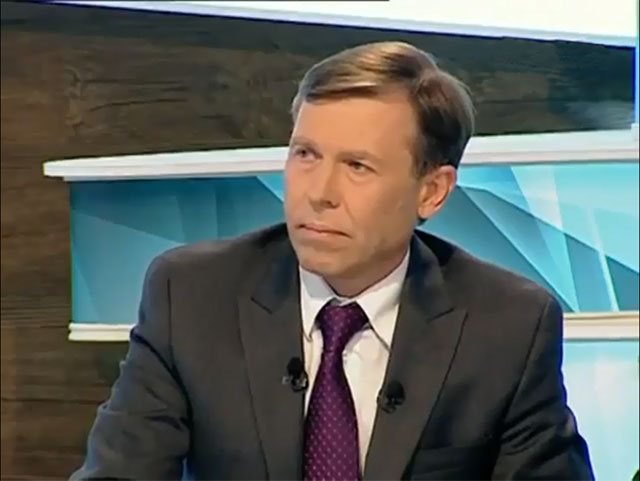
- Sobolyev in 2013

Member of the Verkhovna Rada
- Incumbent
- Assumed office 23 November 2007

Member of the Verkhovna Rada
- In office 14 May 2002 – 25 May 2006

Member of the Verkhovna Rada
- In office 15 May 1990 – 12 May 1998

Personal details
- Born: 5 September 1961 (age 65) Zaporizhzhia, Ukrainian SSR, Soviet Union
- Party: Batkivshchyna
- Education: Kyiv University

Serhiy Vladyslavovych Sobolyev (Ukrainian: Сергій Владиславович Соболєв; born 5 September 1961, in Zaporizhia) is a Ukrainian politician. He served in the Ukrainian parliament from 1990 to 1998 and then again from 2002, with a brief interruption in 2006–2007. In 2014 he was acting Batkivshchyna faction leader.

== Education ==
Sobolev graduated from the Zaporozhye State Pedagogical Institute (now – Zaporizhzhya National University in 1983 with a specialty in History, before earning a second degree from the Law School at Taras Shevchenko National University of Kyiv in 1996.

== Career ==
=== Early career ===
His work experience began in 1978, at the Zaporozhye defense plant "Gamma".

From 1983–1985 he served in the Armed Forces.

From 1985 to 1986 he worked at the Dnieper electrode plant in Zaporozhye.

In 1986–1990 was teaching history in Zaporozhye Pedagogical School number 1.

=== Political activity ===
By July 1990, he had become a member of the Communist Party. He later moved to the opposition bench.

From 1990–1994, he was national deputy of Ukraine 1st Convocation by Khortitskiy Constituency number 184, Zaporizhzhya region. He was the leader of the group "Democratic Revival of Ukraine" (a member of the same party) and a member of the Parliamentary Committee on Education and Science.

From 1994–1998 he was the national deputy of Ukraine's 2nd Convocation. He headed the parliamentary group "Reforms". He was a member of the Committee on Legal Policy and Legal Reform and deputy chairman of the audit committee of the Verkhovna Rada Committee on privatization. At his suggestion a special parliamentary committee investigated the management of the Black Sea Shipping Company (Company "Blasko") that suspended the presidential decree of Leonid Kravchuk on government bonds. He participated in the development of the Ukraine Constitution and various laws.

In October 1997 he was one of the leaders of the newly formed center-right party "Reforms and Order".

From December 1999 to April 2001 he served as adviser to the prime minister of Ukraine Viktor Yushchenko.

From 2002–2006 he was national deputy of Ukraine fourth convocation, selected by Yushchenko's "Our Ukraine" (16th on the list). He was chairman of the Subcommittee on Legislative Support of executive power and civil service (in administrative reform) Committee on Legal Policy. From 3 March to 22 September 2005 he was the permanent representative of the president of Ukraine in the Verkhovna Rada. He resigned in protest against the dismissal of Government of Yulia Tymoshenko President of Ukraine. In September 2005 he led a faction of PRO.

At the next March 2006 elections Party "Reforms and Order" in the Civic party "PORA-PRP" failed to overcome three percent passing bar. However, in the fall of 2007 early elections Sergey Sobolev joined the election race as part of Yulia Tymoshenko Bloc (at the time of the election, he was deputy chairman of a PRP-led group of experts at Kiev Ltd. "Central European agency"). In the sixth convocation he headed the subcommittee on cooperation with state agencies, local governments, enterprises, institutions and organizations of the Committee for Justice, a member of the Permanent Delegation to the Parliamentary Assembly of the Council of Europe. Also, he was the first deputy head of the fraction.

On 20 February 2010 Sobolev became the leader of PRO. By that time he was the head of Zaporizhia Oblast party organization.

On 17 March 2010 – he became the head of the opposition of the Cabinet of Ministers, which is the de facto group of Yulia Tymoshenko.

According to Arseny Yatsenyuk in October 2012, if he had won the democratic opposition forces in the parliamentary elections he would have become prime minister.

Since 12 December in the 7th Convocation he was national deputy of the All-Ukrainian Union "Fatherland", number 8 on the list. He was the first deputy head of the faction. He was a member of the Committee on Legal Policy. On 21 January 2013 he was elected vice-president of the Ukrainian delegation to the Parliamentary Assembly of the Council of Europe.

His party merged into Batkivshchyna in June 2013.

On 20 March 2014 Sobolev replaced Yatsenyuk as Batkivshchyna faction leader in parliament (due to Yatsenyuk's new position as prime minister in the Yatsenyuk Government).

=== Legislative initiatives ===
Following annexation of Crimea by the Russian Federation Sobolev drafted a bill "On the rights and freedoms of citizens in the temporarily occupied territories" that postulated that Autonomous Republic of Crimea and Sevastopol should be regarded as "temporarily occupied by Russia". The original bill would permit entry and exit from the Crimea only with a special permit and punish "cooperation with the occupying state" with imprisonment. On 15 April 2014 the amended bill passed.

== Family ==
His father is Vladislav Anatoliyvych (1935–) a worker at Zaporozhye aluminum plant and Head of DST. His mother is Ina Mikolayivna (1935-) a retired pediatrician. His wife Nina (1962-) is a history teacher. They have five children – Julia (1983), Elena (1986) another son and twins.

He is fond of football, tennis and skiing and is fluent in English.

== Recognition ==
In March 2000, he was recognized as a civil servant of the third rank.

He was awarded Commander of the Order of merit III degree in August 2005.
