= Demchenko =

Demchenko (Ukrainian: Демченко; Russian: Демченко; Belarusian: Дземчанка) is a gender-neutral Ukrainian surname. It may refer to:

- Albert Demchenko (born 1971), Russian luger
- Andriy Demchenko (born 1976), Ukrainian and Russian footballer
- Anton Demchenko (born 1987), Russian chess grandmaster
- Ivan Demchenko (born 1960), Russian politician
- Nikolai Demchenko (1896–1937), Soviet politician
- Nikita Demchenko (born 2002), Belarusian footballer
- Oleksandr Demchenko (born 1996), Ukrainian footballer
- Ruslan Demchenko (born 1965), Ukrainian diplomat
- Sergey Demchenko (born 1974), Belarusian wrestler
- Serhiy Demchenko (born 1979), Ukrainian boxer
- Svitlana Demchenko (born 2003), Canadian chess player
- Vasily Demchenko (born 1994), Russian ice hockey player
- Victoria Demchenko (born 1995), Russian luger
- Volodymyr Demchenko (born 1981), Ukrainian sprinter
- Yehor Demchenko (born 1997), Ukrainian footballer
- Oleksandr Demchenko (born 1996), Ukrainian footballer
