= Geographical kaleidoscope =

1988 book by Petro Kravchuk

Geographical kaleidoscope Географический калейдоскоп
- Author: Petro Kravchuk
- Original title: Географический калейдоскоп
- Illustrator: Dikareva l.
- Language: Russian
- Subject: Popular science
- Publisher: Soviet School (in Ukrainian)
- Publication date: 1988
- Publication place: Ukraine
- Media type: Print
- Pages: 218
- ISBN: 5-330-00384-9

Geographical kaleidoscope (Russian: "Географический калейдоскоп") is a popular scientific book written by Petro Kravchuk (Ukrainian: Петро Кравчук) and published in 1988 (Kiev).

The book discusses "champions" of the Earth and its earliest explorers.
