= Natalia Korolevska =

Ukrainian politician

- Наталія Королевська
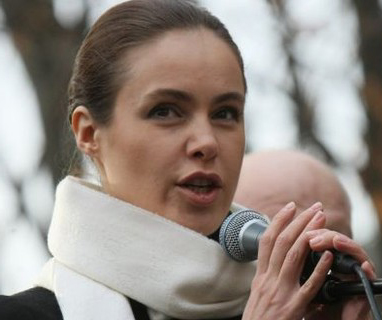
- Korolevska in 2012

2nd Minister of Social Policy of Ukraine
- In office 24 December 2012 – 24 February 2014
- Prime Minister: Mykola Azarov
- Preceded by: Serhiy Tihipko
- Succeeded by: Lyudmyla Denisova

People's Deputy of Ukraine
- In office 25 May 2006 – 15 June 2007
- In office 23 November 2007 – 12 December 2012
- In office 27 November 2014 – 24 February 2023

Personal details
- Born: 18 May 1975 (age 51) Krasnyi Luch, Ukrainian SSR
- Party: Party of Natalia Korolevska "Ukraine – Forward!"
- Other political affiliations: All-Ukrainian Union "Fatherland" (2005–2011)
- Spouse: Yuriy Solod
- Children: 2 sons
- Education: East Ukraine Volodymyr Dahl National University and Donetsk state academy of management
- Occupation: Politician
- Profession: Manager
- Website: www.korolevskaya.com.ua

Natalia Yuriivna Korolevska (Ukrainian: Наталія Юріївна Королевська; born 18 May 1975) is a Ukrainian politician and former Minister of Social Policy of Ukraine. Since 23 December 2011, she has been the party-leader of the Ukrainian Social Democratic Party. On 22 March 2012, the Ukrainian Social Democratic Party was renamed Party of Natalia Korolevska "Ukraine – Forward!". Korolevska has been a people's deputy in Ukraine's parliament for four of its convocations until, during the 9th Ukrainian Verkhovna Rada (Ukrainian parliament), her mandate was terminated on her own request in February 2023.

== Biography ==
Korolevska was born in 1975 in Krasnyi Luch, Luhansk Oblast, Ukrainian SSR. Her father was a miner, her mother a teacher. Korolevska graduated from the East Ukraine Volodymyr Dahl National University in 1997 and the Donetsk state academy of management in 2002 (speciality "Manager of organizations"). From 1992 Korolevska worked in several management functions, starting in a company set up by her older brother Kostiantyn, earning a "Leader of middle business" award in 2004.

=== Political career ===
From 2002 until 2006, Korolevska was a deputy of the Luhansk regional council. During the Presidential election 2004 she supported Victor Yanukovich. Korolevska was a member of Council of Entrepreneurs under the Cabinet of Ministers of Ukraine in the years 2003, 2004 and 2005.

Korolevska became a member of All-Ukrainian Union "Fatherland" (a part of Bloc Yulia Tymoshenko) in autumn 2005 because "she is sure that the block of Yulia Tymoshenko is the future". Korolevska decided to enter national politics: "I knew the most complex problems of the Donbas and sincerely wanted to solve them, but saw and understood that it is impossible to do so at the level of the regional council. It is in this spirit that I arrived in the Verkhovna Rada in 2006. Disappointment came quickly enough: it seems that everyone here is well aware of the difficulties, but nobody makes an attempt [to] resolve them and to help the people." During the 2006 and 2007 parliamentary elections, she was elected as a deputy to the Verkhovna Rada. During these tenures Korolevska served as the chairperson of the committee on the issues of industrial and regulatory policy and entrepreneurship in the Verkhovna Rada.

Korolevska represented her party in early December 2011 at the Congress of the European People's Party (party leader Tymoshenko was in custody at the time).

On 23 December 2011, Korolevska was elected the leader of the Ukrainian Social Democratic Party (just like her former party, that party was also a member of the Yulia Tymoshenko Bloc). Hence she did not change faction in the Verkhovna Rada.

On 14 March 2012 Korolevska was expelled from her "Bloc Yulia Tymoshenko-Batkivschyna"-faction after refusing to vote for the inclusion of a proposal in the agenda of the Verkhovna Rada (according to the faction, Korolevska claimed her "voting card" was stolen and that she wanted to vote for the proposal).

The faction stated Korolevska was expelled "for breach of parliamentary ethics and cooperation with the Presidential Administration"; she had been reprimanded previously. Two deputies of the "Yulia Tymoshenko Block-Batkivschyna" faction, who were like Korolevska members of the Ukrainian Social Democratic Party, resigned from the faction in protest against Korolevska's expulsion the same day.

On the 22 March 2012 party congress the Ukrainian Social Democratic Party was renamed Ukraine – Forward!. In the October 2012 Ukrainian parliamentary election the party won 1.58% of the national votes and no constituencies and thus failed to win parliamentary representation.

Despite that in June 2012 her party had stated it would not cooperate with the Party of Regions in a new parliament and in October 2012 had threatened Ukrainian President Viktor Yanukovych with impeachment Korolevska became Minister of Social Policy of Ukraine in the Party of Regions led and appointed by Yanukovych second Azarov Government on 24 December 2012.

On 24 February 2014, just after the "Maidan revolution", the Verkhovna Rada dismissed Korolevska.

Korolevska was a candidate in the 25 May 2014 Ukrainian presidential election; but withdrew her candidacy on 1 May.

In the October 2014 Ukrainian parliamentary election Korolevska was again re-elected into parliament; this time after placing 8th on the electoral list of Opposition Bloc. In the same election her husband Yuriy Solod was also elected for Opposition Bloc after winning a single-member districts seat in Slovyansk with 34.17% of the votes

On 17 January 2015 (during the war in Donbas) the Prosecutor General's Office of Ukraine launched an investigation into Korolevska's alleged involvement in funding separatism.

Korolevska was re-elected, placed 4th on the party list of Opposition Platform — For Life this time, in the 2019 Ukrainian parliamentary election. Her husband Yuriy Solod was also re-elected in constituency No. 47 for the same party. Ukrainian journalists discovered that Korolevska failed to disclose her ownership of real estate in Russia's Moscow Oblast for 16 years in a row; in addition, she has allegedly owned real estate and a plot of land in Russia since 2005.

As a Pro-Russian deputy, Korolevska left Ukraine after full scale Russian invasion.

In February 2023 Korolevska and her husband Solod asked for the deprivation of their parliamentary mandates for "health and family circumstance." On 24 February 2023 parliament withdrew their mandates.

In December 2022, National Agency on Corruption Prevention revealed that Korolevska had financially enriched herself as a deputy of Rada by almost UAH 50 million and she had deliberately declared dishonest data about his income; her tax declaration in 2020 differed by UAH 3,8 million from the reliable ones.

In June 2023 Together with National Anti-Corruption Bureau of Ukraine, Specialized Anti-Corruption Prosecutor's Office declared Korolevska wanted in absentia for concealing wealth that is a criminal act according to Part 1 of Article 366-2 of the Criminal Code of Ukraine.

== Political positions ==
"Almost 20 years spent talking about European values and the principles of democracy has led us to the world of illusions and double standards."

— Korolevska during the Yalta European Strategy conference 2011

Korolevska political goal is "to create an efficient, transparent and stable economy" with less Government involvement. She claims to stand for political reforms to combat poverty and corruption. Korolevska wants to involve the non-government sector more in decision-making. She is against re-privatization.

In February 2012 she accused the Azarov Government of being "amateurish" "and it doesn't seem to notice that the country is on the verge of default".

In early March 2012, Korolevska called for the opposition to run the 2012 parliamentary elections on a single list. The day after she was expelled from the "Bloc Yulia Tymoshenko-Batkivschyna"-faction (formerly BYuT faction) in the Verkhovna Rada (Ukrainian parliament) on 14 March 2012 she stated "Deputies from the so-called opposition have united with the majority factions; an anti-national majority consisting of representatives of the current and previous government has been formed in the Verkhovna Rada". Korolevska's Ukrainian Social Democratic Party left the Dictatorship Resistance Committee (the main vehicle where the opposition was negotiating forming joint electoral list of candidates in electoral districts in the 2012 parliamentary elections) on 14 March 2012.

== Cultural and political image ==
Korolevska sees herself as a representative of the upcoming generation of political leaders of Ukraine. In 2007 "Focus" magazine placed Korolevska 66th in a survey investigating the most influential women of Ukraine. In 2009 she reached the 9th spot in that survey (six places higher than the Minister of Labor and Social Policy Lyudmyla Denisova); "in 2009 she increased her presence in the coal market of Ukraine", according to Focus.

In February 2008 Focus placed Korolevska at the 93rd place in their ranking of the richest Ukrainians. Experts of the magazine assessed her assets to be worth US$ 243 million (in the food industry). According to Korolevska she is no longer active in business and her husband controls her assets.

According to media in Luhansk Korolevska was one of the most influential figures in that region.

According to experts Korolevska spend about $1.25 million on a spring 2012 national billboards campaign aimed at raising her profile; her press service did not give any figures about expenditures on this ad campaign, stating it was a "commercial secret".

Political offices
Preceded by Sergei Tigipko	Minister of Social Policy; 2012–2014	Succeeded by Lyudmyla Denisova
Party political offices
Preceded by Yevhen Korniychuk	Leader of Party of Natalia Korolevska "Ukraine – Forward!"; 2011–present	Succeeded by Incumbent
