= Mykola Tomenko =

Ukrainian politician

- Микола Томенко
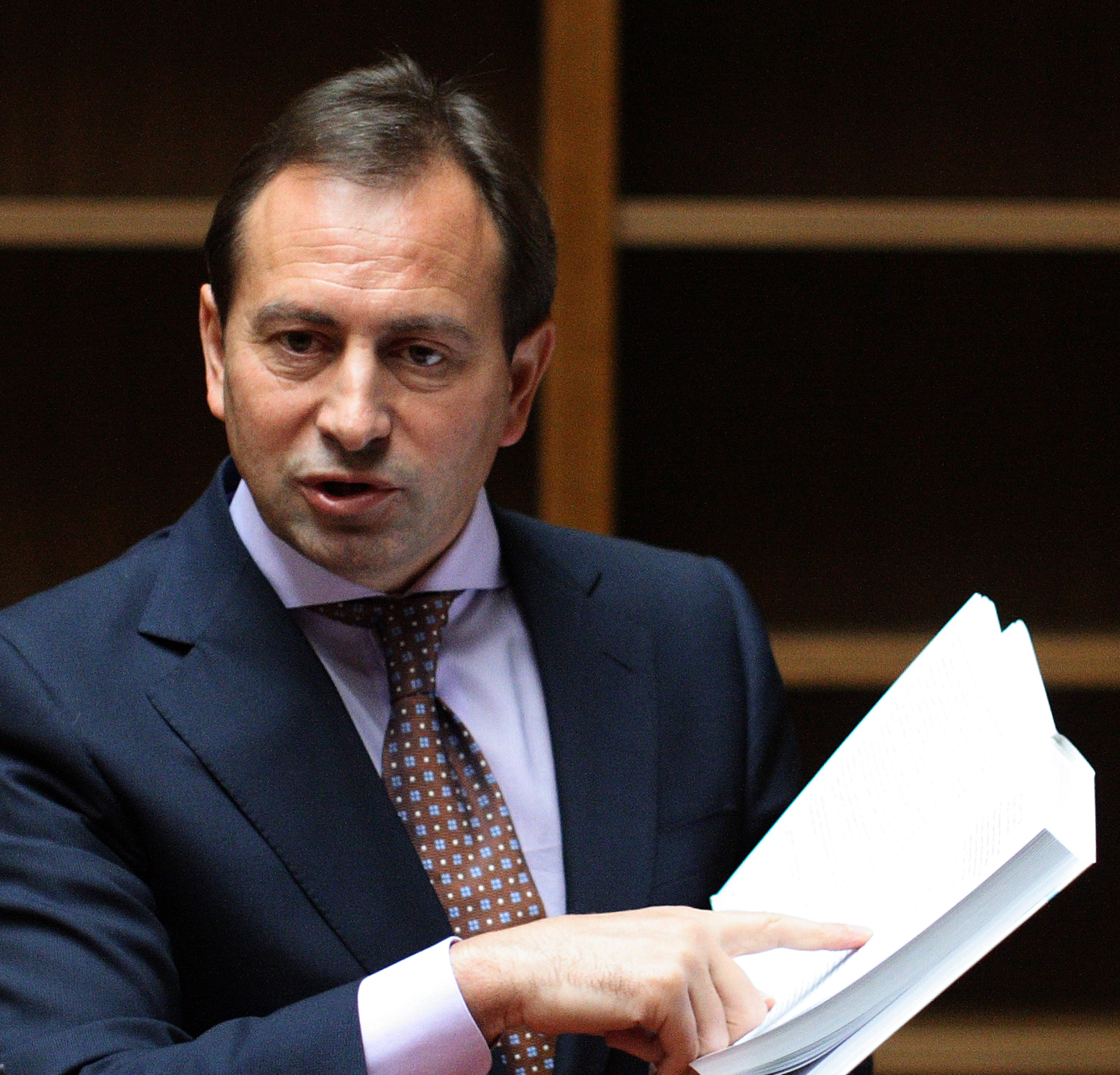

Chairman of the Committee of the Verkhovna Rada on ecological policy of the 8th convocation
- In office December 4, 2014 – March 25, 2016
- Preceded by: Iryna Sekh

Deputy Chairman of the Verkhovna Rada of the 6th convocation
- In office September 2, 2008 – December 12, 2012
- Preceded by: Mykola Tomenko
- Succeeded by: Ruslan Koshulynskyi

Deputy Chairman of the Verkhovna Rada of the 5th convocation
- In office February 8, 2007 – June 14, 2007
- Preceded by: Oleksandr Zinchenko
- Succeeded by: Mykola Tomenko

Vice-Prime Minister of Ukraine on humanitarian policy
- In office February 4, 2005 – September 8, 2005
- Prime Minister: Yulia Tymoshenko
- Preceded by: Dmytro Tabachnyk
- Succeeded by: Vyacheslav Kyrylenko

People's Deputy of Ukraine

4th convocation
- In office May 14, 2002 – March 3, 2005
- Constituency: Our Ukraine Bloc, No.62

5th convocation
- In office May 25, 2006 – June 14, 2007
- Constituency: Yulia Tymoshenko Bloc, No.3

6th convocation
- In office November 23, 2007 – December 12, 2012
- Constituency: Yulia Tymoshenko Bloc, No.3

7th convocation
- In office December 12, 2012 – November 27, 2014
- Constituency: Fatherland (until April 2, 2014), No.10

8th convocation
- In office November 27, 2014 – March 25, 2016
- Constituency: Petro Poroshenko Bloc, No.8

Personal details
- Born: December 11, 1964 (age 61) Mali Kanivtsi, Cherkasy Oblast, Ukrainian SSR (now Ukraine)
- Party: Petro Poroshenko Bloc
- Other political affiliations: Our Ukraine Bloc (2002-05); Y. Tymoshenko Bloc (2005-14)
- Spouse: Valentyna
- Children: Pavlo (b. 1989)
- Website: www.tomenko.kiev.ua

Mykola Volodymyrovych Tomenko (Ukrainian: Микола Володимирович Томенко; born December 11, 1964) is a Ukrainian politician. He has been a member of Ukraine's parliament, the Verkhovna Rada from 2006 until 2016. In 2014, Tomenko became a member of the Petro Poroshenko Bloc, which elected him to the 8th Ukrainian Verkhovna Rada on its party lists during the 2014 parliamentary election. On 25 March 2016 the party Congress of Petro Poroshenko Bloc removed Tomenko's parliamentary mandate using the Imperative mandate provisions of the Ukrainian constitution. This was considered illegal by Tomenko; on 28 July 2016 Ukraine's highest Administrative Court rejected his appeal to gain back his parliamentary seat.

Tomenko is a centre-right politician, previously a member of the Yulia Tymoshenko Bloc. He was also one of the leaders and most notable speakers of the Orange Revolution. In 2005, Tomenko served as Vice-Prime Minister of Ukraine in the Cabinet of Yulia Tymoshenko (coordinating humanitarian policy). In the Verkhovna Rada, he also served as the Chairman of the Freedom of Speech and Mass Media Committee and twice as the Deputy Chairman of the Verkhovna Rada (during the 6th and 7th convocations). Tomenko tendered his resignation as deputy Chairman of the Verkhovna Rada on 4 July 2012 as a sign of protest against the way legislation on languages in Ukraine was passed on 3 July 2012.

== Biography ==
=== Early life ===
Mykola Tomenko (born in a village of Mali Kanivtsi, Chornobai Raion, currently Zolotonosha Raion, in Cherkasy Oblast of Ukraine) is one of the few veterans of the Soviet-Afghan War among the Ukrainian politicians. Between 1983, and 1985 Tomenko served his conscript service in the Soviet Airborne Troops, reaching a rank of Sergeant during the war.

In 1989, after his military service, Tomenko graduated from Kyiv University specializing in Ukrainian political history. Shortly after, in 1992 he obtained his Kandidat degree (roughly equivalent to Ph.D.) defending his thesis on the topic "The issue of statehood in the program, documents and activities of the present-day parties in Ukraine (historical-political analysis)."

During his student years, after initially being a Komsomol activist, Tomenko later became the initiator of the local Komsomol organization's dissolution.

Tomenko began his professional career in 1992 at the Institute of National Operation and Self-government as the Head of the Political Science Department. Between 1992 and 1998 he was the vice-president of the Foundation "The Ukrainian Outlook", the director of the Institute of Post-communism Society and the Institute of Politics (listed are non-governmental politics research organizations). At the same time he continued lecturing history and political science courses at Kyiv universities, finally becoming the Head of the Politology department in the National University "Kyiv-Mohyla Academy".

=== Political career ===
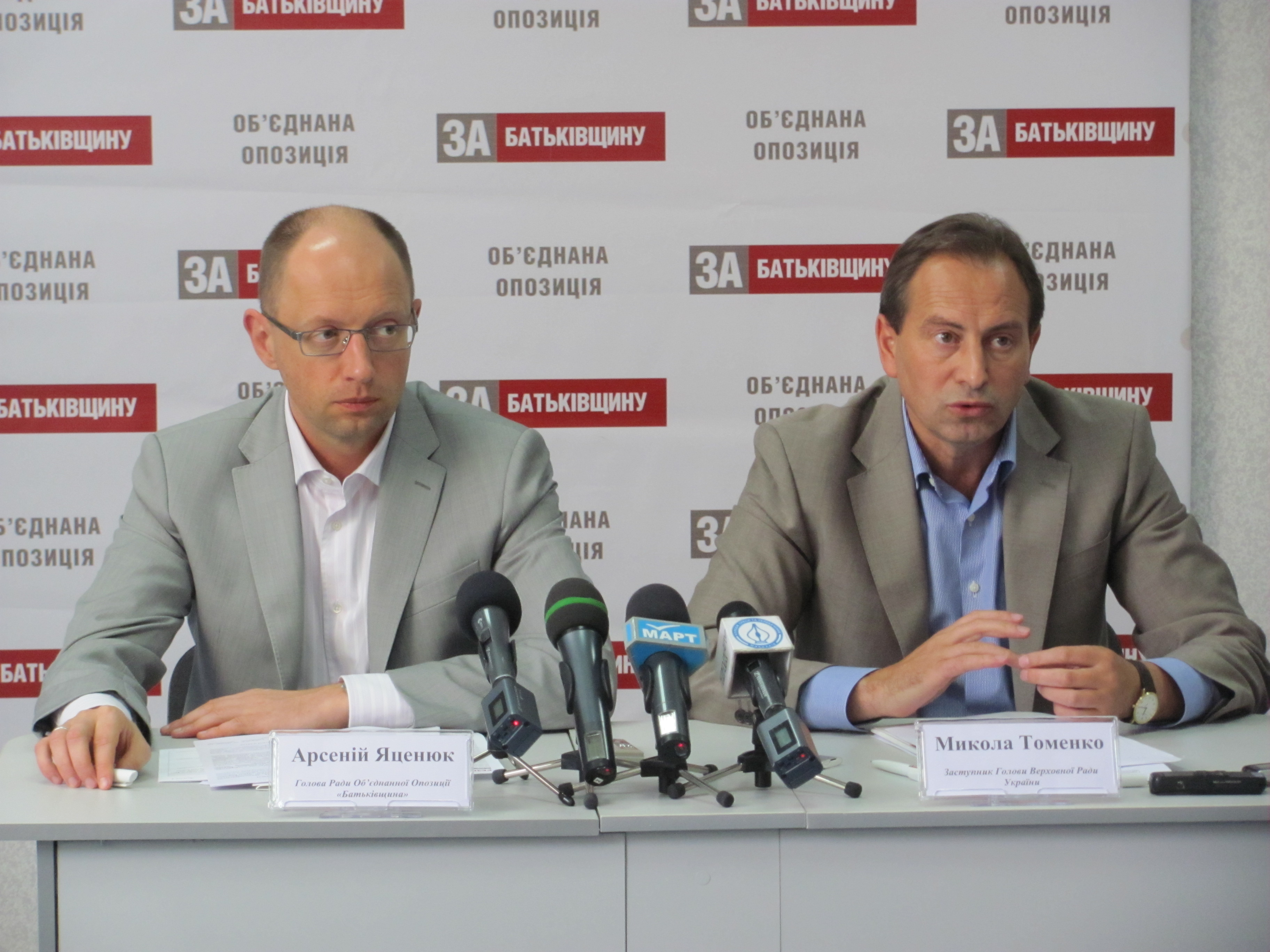
Mykola Tomenko seated with Arseniy Yatsenyuk, then the leader of the All-Ukrainian Union "Fatherland".

In mid-1990s Tomenko began his political career as a member of "My" (Ukrainian for Us) Political Union - a liberal-patriotic group close to Reforms and Order Party. In 1998 he was number 15 in the electoral list of Parliament candidates for Reforms and Order Party, but the party obtained no seats in parliament.

In 2002 Tomenko was elected to the Parliament on the list of the "Our Ukraine" Block (which contained Reforms and Order Party).

In late 2005 he left the party over a split on whether to back Yulia Tymoshenko or President Viktor Yushchenko (at the time he accused Petro Poroshenko and other Yushchenko allies of corruption), and became a member of Yulia Tymoshenko Bloc. In 2006 Tomenko became elected to Verkhovna Rada on the list of that Bloc. Tomenko was placed at number 8 on the electoral list of Batkivshchina during the 2012 Ukrainian parliamentary election. He was re-elected into parliament.

In the 2014 Ukrainian parliamentary election Tomenko was re-elected into parliament after being in the top 10 of the electoral list of Petro Poroshenko Bloc. On 25 December 2015 Tomenko left the party's parliamentary faction. On 25 March 2016 the party Congress of Petro Poroshenko Bloc withdraw his parliamentary mandate using the Imperative mandate provisions of the Ukrainian constitution. This was considered illegal by Tomenko; on 28 July 2016 Ukraine's highest Administrative Court rejected his appeal to gain back his parliamentary seat.

In April 2016 Tomenko founded and became the chairman of the “Native Land” organization aimed to "discuss an alternative public strategy for Ukraine".

After declaring support for the candidature of Anatoliy Hrytsenko in the 2019 Ukrainian presidential election Tomenko became the supervisor of Hrytsenko's media strategy in Hrytsenko's election headquarters.

In the July 2019 Ukrainian parliamentary election Tomenko was placed in the top five in the top ten of the party list of Civil Position. But the party did not win any seats (winning 1.04% of the national vote and not one constituency).

Tomenko is a candidate (and party leader) for the Kyiv City Council and was simultaneously candidate for Mayor of Kyiv for the party "Native Land" in the 2020 Kyiv local election. He finished 8th place with 15.039 votes. "Native Land" also failed to win any seats in the Kyiv City Council. The “Native Land” party was a continuation of the (2016 established) organization with the same name.

== Political style ==
Entering politics after studying it, Tomenko became a public speaker and hot issues commenter. This was criticized by his political opponents. In summer 2005, President Viktor Yuschenko became dissatisfied with Tomenko's public attitude towards coalition allies and accused him of willingness to "comment anything on Earth" and a lack of in-government team-play sense. One controversy during Tomenko's political career occurred when the 2005 Eurovision Song Contest was hosted in Kyiv. He openly supported the GreenJolly music group as a candidate for representative of Ukraine. This caused criticism from show business professionals that alleged a poor choice and Tomenko's abuse of Deputy Prime Minister position during the process.

== Ukrainian Cultural Development ==
Tomenko initiated several promotional programs to familiarize Ukraine to visitors as well as the well established residents with the Seven Wonders of Ukraine followed by the Seven Natural Wonders of Ukraine and the Seven Most Scenic Routes of Ukraine.

Mykola Tomenko authored several scholarly books, more than a dozen of journal articles, and, an essay, like "Theory of Ukrainian Love".

== Selected works ==
- Томенко М. Теорія українського кохання. К., 2004.
- Кудряшов С., Томенко М. та ін. Карта Севастополя: тріумф і трагедія Президентів: Фонд "Українська Перспектива": Експертна оцінка. - К., 1996. (and other research papers of this foundation)
- several studies of Ukrainian political history authored by Tomenko and S. Sliusarenko
- "Ukrainian romantic Mykola Gogol"
