= Petro Kravchuk =

Ukrainian politician (1962–2022)

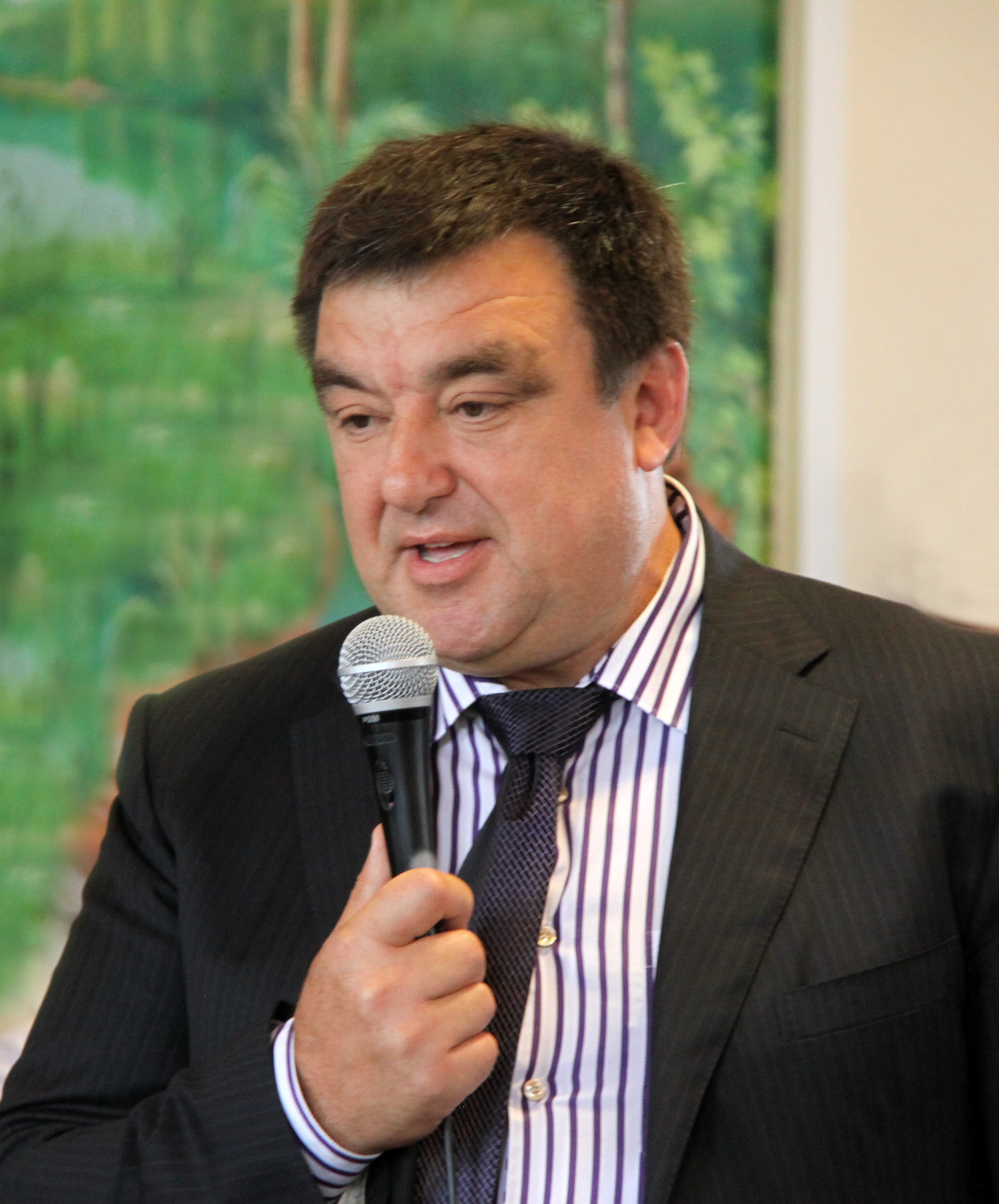
- Kravchuk in 2015

Chairman of the State Agency of Automobile Roads of Ukraine
- In office 9 January 2008 – 21 August 2008
- Preceded by: Volodymyr Demishkan
- Succeeded by: Gurzhos Vadym

People's Deputy of Ukraine
- In office 25 May 2006 – 23 May 2008

Personal details
- Born: Petro Kostiantynovych Kravchuk; 11 July 1962 Pidrizhzhia, Volyn Oblast, Ukrainian SSR, Soviet Union
- Died: 3 August 2022 (aged 60)
- Party: Ukraine – Forward!
- Education: Lviv Polytechnic National University

Petro Kostiantynovych Kravchuk (Ukrainian: Петро́ Костянти́нович Кравчу́к; 11 July 1962 – 3 August 2022) was a Ukrainian politician. A member of Ukraine – Forward!, he served as a People's Deputy of Ukraine from 2006 to 2008.

== Early life ==
Kravchuk was born on 11 July 1962 in the village of Pidrizhzhia, which was then part of the Ukrainian SSR in the Soviet Union. In 1979, after completing secondary school he started working as a laborer. He first worked as a driver for the kolkhoz "Volyn" in Kovel, and then for the kolkhoz "Pivnichnyi" in the Miyakinsky District (within the Russian SFSR). Afterwards, he completed his mandatory service in the Soviet Armed Forces in Lutsk, working as a boiler operator, before becoming a driver and worker again for Lutsk Railway Station Market. In 1991, he graduated from Lviv Polytechnic National University with a specialty in automobiles and automative management, and also received the qualification to be a mechanical engineer.

After graduating, he worked as deputy director of the MP "Mairus" until 1994, and then as General Director of the Ukrainian-German JV "KLV" until 2001. He also later was the Director for the Ukrainian‑German JV “Volyn‑Trans" and the LLC “Minmat Reverberi".

== Political career ==
In the 1998 Ukrainian parliamentary election, he ran as a candidate for the Verkhovna Rada on the People's Democratic Party of Ukraine (KhDPU) ticket and was no. 26 on their party list. He later attempted to run again in the 2002 Ukrainian parliamentary election as a self-nominated candidate, but did obtain a seat either. He finally successfully won a seat in the 2006 Ukrainian parliamentary election after joining the Yulia Tymoshenko Bloc, which he was no. 83 on their party list for. Upon joining the Rada, he became a member of the Yulia Tymoshenko Bloc faction, but resigned his mandate early on 12 June 2007. However, he was reelected during the 2007 Ukrainian parliamentary election, again for the Yulia Tymoshenko Bloc, after being no. 68 on the party list.

== Personal life ==
Kravchuk died on 3 August 2022, at the age of 60.
