= Petro Pylypchuk =

Ukrainian lawyer and judge (1947–2022)

Chairman of the Supreme Court of Ukraine
- In office 23 December 2011 – 18 April 2013
- Preceded by: Vasyl Onopenko
- Succeeded by: Mykhailovych Yaroslav

Personal details
- Born: Petro Pylypovich Pylypchuk; 13 October 1947 Ternavka, Iziaslav Raion, Iziaslav Raion, Khmelnytskyi Oblast, Ukrainian SSR, USSR
- Died: 18 December 2022 (aged 75)
- Education: Kharkiv Law Institute
- Occupation: Lawyer; Judge

Petro Pylypovych Pylypchuk (Ukrainian: Петро Пилипович Пилипчук; 13 October 1947 – 18 December 2022) was a Ukrainian lawyer and judge. He served as chairman of the Supreme Court from 2011 to 2013.

Pylypchuk died on 18 December 2022, at the age of 75.
