= Ruslan Demchenko =

Ukrainian diplomat (born 1965)

Ruslan Demchenko Руслан Демченко

Advisor to the President of Ukraine
- Incumbent
- Assumed office 23 September 2014
- President: Petro Poroshenko; Volodymyr Zelenskyy

Personal details
- Born: Ruslan Mykhailovych Demchenko; 15 July 1965 (age 61) Kyiv, Ukrainian SSR, Soviet Union
- Education: Kyiv State University
- Occupation: diplomat

Ruslan Mykhailovych Demchenko (Ukrainian: Руслан Михайлович Демченко; born 15 July 1965) is a Ukrainian diplomat. He is an adviser to the President of Ukraine.

First Deputy Secretary of the National Security and Defense Council.

== Biography ==
Demchenko studied International relations at the University of Kyiv. He worked as the 2nd Secretary of the Ukrainian Embassy in Washington.

From 2000 to 2003, he was Consul General of Ukraine in Istanbul.

From 2003 to 2005, he served as Ambassador of Ukraine to Serbia and Montenegro.

From 2005 to 2006, he led the State Protocol Service of the President of Ukraine.

From 2006 to 2010, Demchenko was the Head of the Office of the President of Ukraine.

From 2010 to 2014, he was First Deputy Minister of Foreign Affairs of Ukraine.

== Awards ==
- Order of Prince Yaroslav the Wise, 5th class (2010).
- Order of Merit, 3rd class (2019).
