= Reforms and Order Party =

Reforms and Order Party Партія "Реформи і порядок"
- Leader: Serhii Sobolev
- Founded: 24 October 1997
- Dissolved: 15 June 2013
- Merged into: All-Ukrainian Union "Fatherland"
- Headquarters: Kyiv
- Ideology: Liberalism; National Democracy
- Political position: Centre-right
- Colours: Blue

Website
- http://www.prp.org.ua/

Party Reform and Order (Ukrainian: Партія "Реформи і порядок", romanized: Partiia "Reformy i poriadok") was a liberal political party in Ukraine. The party merged into All-Ukrainian Union "Fatherland" in June 2013.

== History ==
The party was organized in October 1997 as a right-wing party, led by ex-vice Prime Minister Viktor Pynzenyk. And it was registered as the fiftieth political party in the history of Ukrainian modern politics. The party was an offspring from the electoral bloc of 1997 "Forward, Ukraine!".

At the parliamentary elections on 29 March 1998 the party, obtained 3,13% of the votes, 10th place out of 30 participated parties, and 3 (single-mandate constituency) seats in the parliament; 2 in the Lviv Oblast and 1 in the Mykolaiv Oblast.

At the parliamentary elections on 30 March 2002, the party was part of the Viktor Yushchenko Bloc Our Ukraine. Before the Orange Revolution of 2004 the party renamed itself into Our Ukraine (Nasha Ukrayina). After the revolution the party kept some distance from the People's Union Our Ukraine and after a court decision renamed itself again in Party Reform and Order (Partiya Reformy i Poriadok).

At the parliamentary elections on 26 March 2006, it won in an alliance with PORA 1.47% of the popular vote and no seats.

On December 3, 2006 the party announced their decision to join the Yuliya Tymoshenko Bloc. In the parliamentary elections on 30 September 2007, the party was part of the Yulia Tymoshenko Bloc alliance, that won 156 out of 450 seats.

In April 2010 Viktor Pynzenyk left the party; Serhii Sobolev had been elected party chairman on February 20, 2010.

In the 2010 local elections the party won 2 representative in the regional parliament of the Cherkasy Oblast and 1 seats in the city council of Lviv.

The party competed on one single party under "umbrella" party "Fatherland" (also a former member of the Yuliya Tymoshenko Bloc), together with several other parties, during the 2012 parliamentary elections During the election this list won 62 seats (25.55% of the votes) under the proportional party-list system and another 39 by winning 39 simple-majority constituencies; a total of 101 seats in Parliament.

The party (and Front for Change) merged into "Fatherland" on 15 June 2013. The party is still registered at the Ukrainian Ministry of Justice.

== Election results ==
Verkhovna Rada of Ukraine
Year	Party-list			Constituency/total	Overall seats won	Seat change	Government
Year	Popular vote	%	Seats total	Constituency/total	Overall seats won	Seat change	Government
1998	832,574	3.23%	0/225	3/220	3 / 450	▲3	government support
2002	Our Ukraine bloc				28 / 450	▲25	opposition
2006	Civic Bloc PORA-PRP				0 / 450	▼25	extra-parliamentary
2007	Yulia Tymoshenko Bloc				10 / 450	▲10	coalition government
2012	United Opposition						opposition

== See also ==
- Liberalism
- Contributions to liberal theory
- Liberalism worldwide
- List of liberal parties
- Liberal democracy
- Liberalism in Ukraine
