= Batkivshchyna =

Political party in Ukraine

All-Ukrainian Union "Fatherland" Всеукраїнське об'єднання "Батьківщина"
- Leader: Yulia Tymoshenko
- Founded: 9 July 1999
- Split from: Hromada
- Headquarters: Kyiv
- Youth wing: Young Batkivshchyna
- Membership (2020): ≈30,000 (Note: The party claimed a "tens of thousands" figure.)
- Ideology: Populism; Social democracy; National Democracy; Ukrainian nationalism; Pro-Europeanism; Faction: Conservatism
- Political position: Centre-left; Faction: Centre to centre-right
- European affiliation: European People's Party (observer)
- International affiliation: International Democracy Union; Centrist Democrat International (formerly)
- Colours: Crimson
- Slogan: We Have the Power to Change Everything
- Verkhovna Rada: 25 / 450
- Regions: 4,468 / 43,122

Party flag

Website
- ba.org.ua

The All-Ukrainian Union "Fatherland" (Ukrainian: Всеукраїнське об'єднання "Батьківщина", romanized: Vseukrains'ke obiednannia "Bat'kivshchyna"), referred to as Batkivshchyna (Ukrainian: [ˌbɑtʲkiu̯ˈʃtʃɪnɐ]), is a political party in Ukraine led by People's Deputy of Ukraine, former Ukrainian Prime Minister Yulia Tymoshenko. As the core party of the former Yulia Tymoshenko Bloc, Batkivshchyna has been represented in the Verkhovna Rada—the parliament of Ukraine—since Yulia Tymoshenko set up the parliamentary faction of the same name in March 1999. After the November 2011 banning of the participation of blocs of political parties in parliamentary elections, Batkivshchyna became a major force in Ukrainian politics independently.

In the 2012 Ukrainian parliamentary election, Batkivshchyna took part under the banner "United opposition Batkivshchyna" and other parties allied with Batkivshchyna. The list won 62 seats and 25.55 percent of the vote under the nationwide proportional party-list system (down from 30.71 percent in 2007 for the Yulia Tymoshenko Bloc), and another 39 in constituencies – thus a total of 101 seats. On 15 June 2013, the parties "Front of Changes" and "Reforms and Order" merged with the Batkivshchyna by self-liquidation. By 31 December 2013, the parliamentary faction Batkivshchyna had 90 deputies.

From 5 August 2011 to 22 February 2014, Yulia Tymoshenko was a political prisoner of the Yanukovych government. In the concluding days of the 2014 Ukrainian revolution, she was released after three years in jail and her reputation was rehabilitated by the Supreme Court of Ukraine and the European Court of Human Rights. Tymoshenko began reforming the party, and Batkivshchyna went into the parliamentary elections of 2014 with new members—the top five including Nadiya Savchenko, Yulia Tymoshenko, Ihor Lutsenko, Serhiy Sobolev, and Alyona Shkrum. Based on the election results, the party received 19 seats in the Ukrainian parliament: 17 according to party lists and two through the majority system. Until 17 February 2016, the party was a member of the Second Yatsenyuk Government, but it later moved into opposition.

In the snap parliamentary election of 2019, Batkivschyna received 8.18 percent of the votes and 26 MPs (two elected in constituencies). In the Verkhovna Rada, the party went into opposition. According to the results of the local elections in 2020, the Batkivshchyna received 12.39% votes of voters, and became one of the leading parties in the local elections in Ukraine. Despite having a social-democratic image, the party joined the European People's Party in 2008. Nevertheless, Batkivshchyna maintains its centre-left position. It is in favor of Ukraine's integration into the EU and joining NATO.

== History ==
=== Early history ===
The predecessor of the party is the Association of Peace-loving Forces "Batkivshchyna", founded in 1995 by Volodymyr Prisnyakov, a rector at Dnipropetrovsk National University. In 1998 Yulia Tymoshenko was elected a people's deputy of the Verkhovna Rada from the Bobrynets constituency in Kirovohrad Oblast. In 1999 Tymoshenko created a parliamentary group called "Batkivshchyna" as a breakaway group of Hromada. On 14 September 1998, the General Prosecutor of Ukraine accused Hromada leader Pavlo Lazarenko of embezzlement, and in the following March, Tymoshenko established the "Fatherland" parliamentary group. On 9 July 1999, based on the parliamentary group and smaller party, a new political party – All-Ukrainian Union "Fatherland" – was founded its constituent congress. On the same day, the Charter of the party was approved. According to which the party is entrusted with the main duties to protect the interests of the Ukrainian people in their struggle for the independence of Ukraine, the preservation of national identity, the European future of the country and a decent life for all its citizens. The first party chairman was elected Viktor Drachenko, a former Communist Party secretary from Dnipropetrovsk Oblast. The party was registered by the Ministry of Justice of Ukraine on 16 September 1999 under certificate number 122. At the second congress, held on 18 December of the same year, Yulia Tymoshenko was elected chairman of the party, replacing Drachenko.

=== Yulia Tymoshenko Bloc ===
In the 2002 parliamentary elections, the party was the main constituent of the Yulia Tymoshenko Bloc. The bloc obtained 22 seats in the parliament—13 of whom were allocated to Batkivshchyna.

Top 10 Batkivshchyna candidates in the 2002 parliamentary elections
- Yulia Tymoshenko
- Oleh Bilorus
- Oleksandr Turchynov
- Mykhailo Pavlovsky
- Petro Tolochko
- Stepan Khmara
- Serhiy Pravdenko
- Viktor Taran
- Valentyn Zubov
- Yevhen Kyrylchuk

In January 2005, Tymoshenko became Prime Minister of Ukraine under Viktor Yushchenko's presidency. Several months earlier, she was a leader in the Orange Revolution which enabled Yushchenko's election.

After losing several seats in 2002 and 2003, the bloc had grown to 40 members by September 2005. In March 2005, the Yabluko party merged with Batkivshchyna. However, in March 2007, Yabluko became the Party of Free Democrats and withdrew from Batkivshchyna. In late 2005, the United Ukraine party also merged with Batkivshchyna. In the 2006 and 2007 parliamentary elections the party was part of the Tymoshenko Bloc, which won 129 of 450 seats in 2006 (22.29 percent of the total vote) and 156 of 450 seats (30.71 percent of the total vote) in 2007.

Top 10 Batkivshchyna candidates in the 2006 parliamentary elections
- Yulia Tymoshenko
- Oleksandr Turchynov
- Mykola Tomenko
- Oleh Bilorus
- Yaroslav Fedorchuk
- Andriy Shkil
- Anatoliy Semynoha
- Serhiy Sas
- Viktor Taran
- Valentyn Zubov
Top 10 Batkivshchyna candidates in the 2007 parliamentary elections
- Yulia Tymoshenko
- Oleksandr Turchynov
- Mykola Tomenko
- Yosyp Vinsky
- Hryhoriy Omelchenko
- Vitaliy Kurylo
- Oleh Bilorus
- Yaroslav Fedorchuk
- Yevhen Suslov
- Andriy Shkil

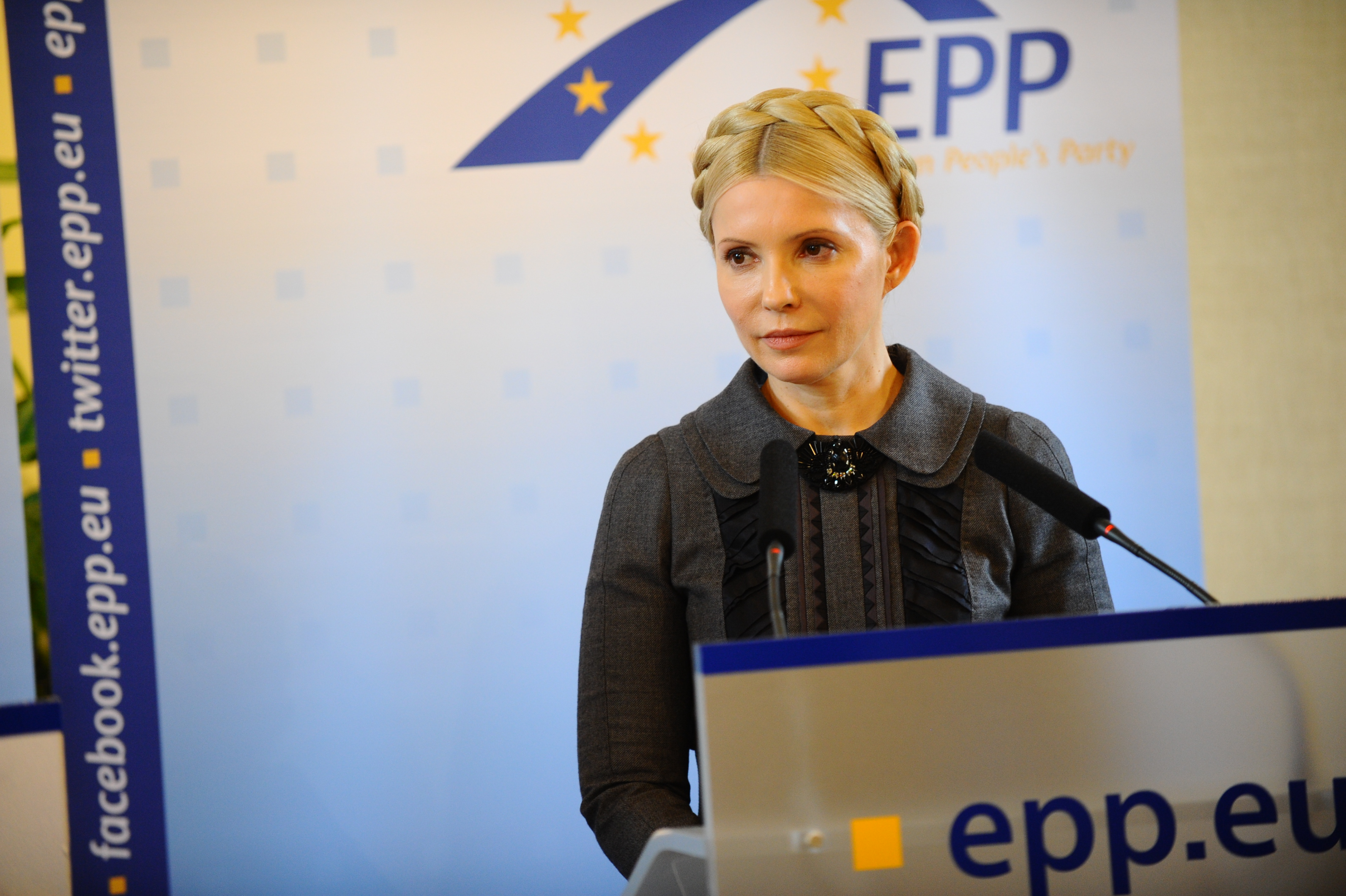
Yulia Tymoshenko at a March 2011 meeting of the European People's Party

On 18 December 2007, Yulia Tymoshenko was reelected prime minister by a two-vote margin, making Our Ukraine–People's Self-Defense Bloc and the Yulia Tymoshenko Bloc a majority coalition. Since 2008, the party has been an observer member of the European People's Party.

In 2009 Batkivshchyna put Tymoshenko forward as a candidate for the presidency of Ukraine. After its defeat in the elections, the parliamentary coalition ceased to exist, and Tymoshenko's cabinet was dismissed. Tymoshenko stated on 22 February 2010 that she would go into opposition. During the 2010 Ukrainian local elections party (political blocs were not permitted to compete in the election) was defeated by the rival Party of Regions in nearly all regions of Ukraine, although it remained the main opposition party. Although Batkivshchyna won seats in 19 of 24 regional parliaments, it did not win a seat in the Supreme Council of Crimea. In Lviv Oblast and Kyiv Oblast as well as in Ternopil the party did not participate in the elections cause it was unable to register its candidates. Yulia Tymoshenko claimed that "fraudulent Batkivshchyna party organisations were registered on orders from Viktor Yanukovych".

=== Batkivshchyna – United Opposition ===
On 16 November 2010, the Yulia Tymoshenko Bloc in the Verkhovna Rada was renamed the Bloc Yulia Tymoshenko-Batkivshchyna. During the presidency of Viktor Yanukovych, several criminal cases were opened against Tymoshenko. On 5 August 2011, Tymoshenko was arrested. On 11 October, she was sentenced to seven years in prison on charges of abuse of power and official authority when entering into gas contracts with Russia in January 2009. The Danish Helsinki Committee, observing the trial, came to the conclusion that it was politically motivated and included violations of the European Convention on Human Rights. Between 2010 and 2013, the European Parliament adopted six resolutions in which the persecution of Tymoshenko was named "politically motivated selective justice".

On 17 November 2011, party blocs were again banned in parliamentary elections. The following month, Batkivshchyna and the People's Self-Defense party announced that the latter would merge with the former, and on 28 December first deputy head of the party Oleksandr Turchynov said, "I believe that other political forces will join us".

Batkivshchyna, the former Yulia Tymoshenko Bloc member Reforms and Order Party and the People's Movement of Ukraine announced their intention to submit a single party list in the March 2012 parliamentary elections. On 7 April, Arseniy Yatsenyuk announced that the Front for Change party would join them on the single-party list.

Top 10 Batkivshchyna candidates in the 2012 parliamentary elections
- Arseniy Yatsenyuk
- Anatoliy Hrytsenko
- Oleksandr Turchynov
- Vyacheslav Kyrylenko
- Hryhoriy Nemyrya
- Serhiy Sobolev
- Borys Tarasyuk
- Mykola Tomenko
- Mykola Knyazhytsky
- Mustafa Dzhemilyev

On 6 June 2012, Vyacheslav Kutovy and Volodymyr Kupchak left the party; Kupchak he had been threatened by party leader Yatsenyuk and the party had "betrayed Yulia Tymoshenko, who had sparked the protest movement Rise up, Ukraine!". In July 2012, Batkivshchyna agreed with the Svoboda party on the distribution of single-member district candidates in the 2012 parliamentary elections. Two weeks before the 28 October election, Batkivshchyna withdrew 26 parliamentary candidates in favour of the Ukrainian Democratic Alliance for Reform (UDAR); UDAR withdrew 26 of its single-seat candidates in favour of Batkivshchyna candidates, attempting to maximise the opposition vote.

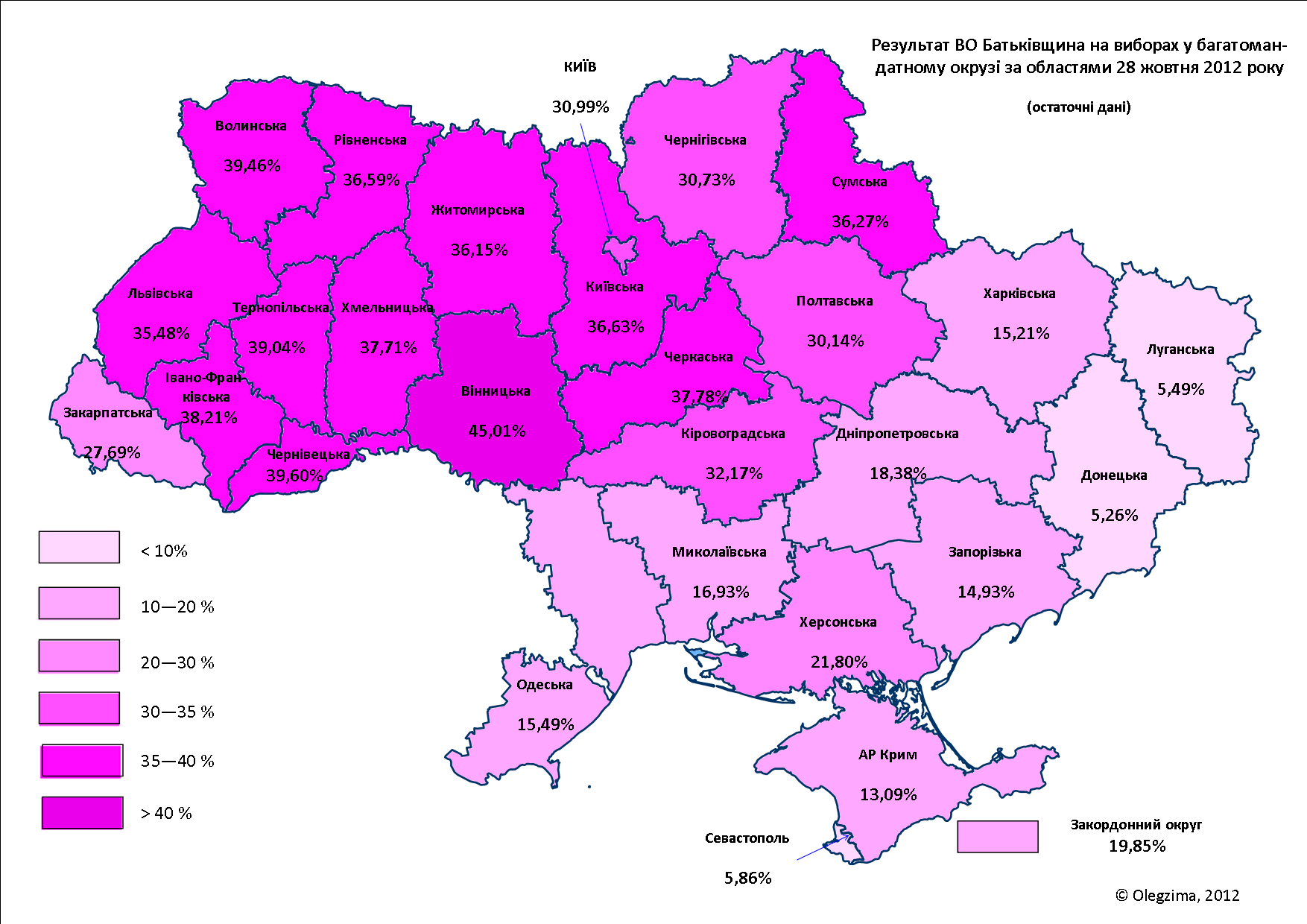
Results of the 2012 elections

Batkivshchyna was a de facto umbrella party in the election, whose election list included members of the Reforms and Order, People's Movement of Ukraine, Front for Change, For Ukraine!, People's Self-Defense, Civil Position and Social Christian parties. In July 2012, members of the Mejlis of the Crimean Tatar People joined the list, known as the Fatherland United Opposition. Front for Change leader Arseniy Yatsenyuk headed the list due to Tymoshenko's imprisonment. The list won 62 seats and 25.55 percent of the vote under the proportional party-list system (down from 30.71 percent in 2007 for the Yulia Tymoshenko Bloc), and another 39 in simple-majority constituencies. Competing in 152 of 225 constituencies, they won a total of 101 seats, 22.67 percent of the 450 seats in the Verkhovna Rada. The party lost about two million votes, compared with the results of the Yulia Tymoshenko Bloc in the previous election. Yatsenyuk was temporarily elected leader of this parliamentary faction on 12 December 2012. On 19 October 2012, Batkivshchyna and Svoboda signed an agreement for "the creation of a coalition of democratic forces in the new parliament". The party also coordinated its parliamentary activities with UDAR.

In early April 2013, four lawmakers left the party in protest of Yatsenyuk's leadership style, and Roman Stadniychuk was forced to replace Serhiy Vlasenko's parliamentary mandate. The following month, Batkivshchyna, UDAR and Svoboda pledged to coordinate for the 2015 Ukrainian presidential election.

=== 2013 unification ===
In December 2012, the parties which aligned with Batkivshchyna in the 2012 parliamentary elections considered forming a single party. On 15 June 2013, the Reforms and Order Party and the Front for Change merged with Batkivshchyna. A portion of the People's Movement of Ukraine (including former chairman Borys Tarasyuk) also merged. The remainder of the party had merged with the Ukrainian People's Party the previous month. During the same congress, the party also approved Tymoshenko's nomination as its candidate for the 2015 Ukrainian presidential election, with all 482 delegates supporting the candidature of Tymoshenko.

=== Euromaidan and return to government ===
The party played a substantial role in the anti-government Euromaidan protests, which began in late November 2013 and culminated on the 21 February 2014 impeachment of President Viktor Yanukovych after the February 2014 Ukrainian revolution, during which Tymoshenko was released from jail and officially rehabilitated. Immediately after the revolution, the Ukrainian Supreme Court closed the case and found that "no crime was committed". The European Court of Human Rights in Strasbourg acknowledged political persecution and torture and stopped studying the criminal cases against Yulia Tymoshenko dated 2011–2014. After Yanukovych's ousting, and return of the 2004 Constitution, a ruling coalition was formed, which included Batkivshchyna, UDAR and Svoboda. This coalition put together a coalition government headed by Arseniy Yatsenyuk.

Yulia Tymoshenko began to reform the party following the revolution. In early August 2014, Batkivshchyna expelled more than 1,500 members, including more than 700 deputies, in a lustration campaign.

The party has its own Batkivshchyna Battalion that has fought in the War in Donbas since May 2014.

=== Post-Euromaidan 2014 parliamentary elections and split of People's Front ===
Top 10 Batkivshchyna candidates in the 2014 parliamentary elections
- Nadiya Savchenko
- Yulia Tymoshenko
- Ihor Lutsenko
- Serhiy Sobolev
- Alyona Shkrum
- Vadym Ivchenko
- Hryhoriy Nemyria
- Ivan Krulko
- Oleksiy Ryabchyn
- Ihor Zhdanov

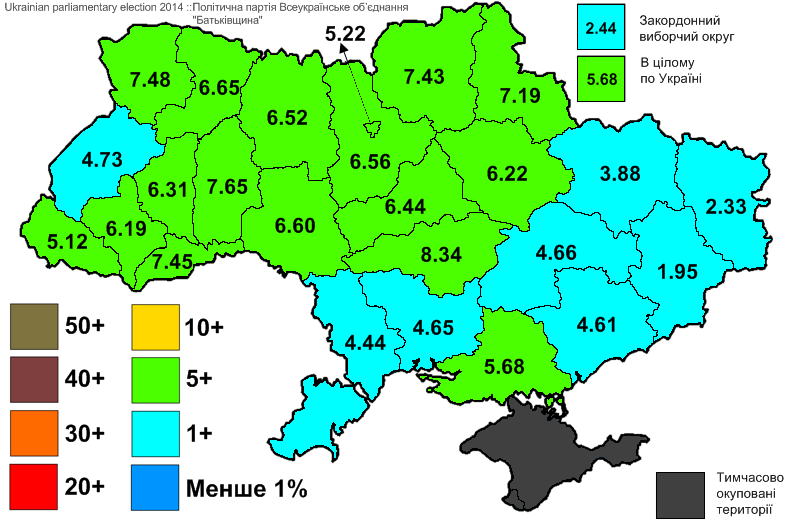
Results of the 2014 elections

On 22 September 2014, the Central Election Commission made the decision to register Batkivshchyna in a nationwide multi-member constituency at the extraordinary elections to the Verkhovna Rada. Batkivshchyna garnered 894,837 votes (5.68%) in the elections, which meant that it was admitted to the 8th convocation of the Verkhovna Rada of Ukraine with 17 seats on party lists, and two seats in majority constituencies. Following the elections the party became a member of the coalition supporting the current second Yatsenyuk Government and had one minister in this government.

On 11 December 2014, parliament supported Yulia Tymoshenko's initiative calling for the release of Nadiya Savchenko. On 25 May 2016, Savchencko was exchanged in a prisoner swap for two Russian GRU officers captured by Ukraine. (Technically, she was granted a pardon by president Vladimir Putin.)

On 17 February 2016, Batkivshchyna withdrew from the Second Yatsenyuk Government following a vote in the Rada to remove Yatsenyuk from his position, which was rejected by a majority.

The party did not join the coalition that supports the Groysman Government, which was installed on 14 April 2016.

During the 17 July 2016 constituency mid-term elections, the party won two additional seats in the Ukrainian parliament.

On 15 December 2016, Batkivshchyna expelled the number 1 on its 2014 parliamentary election list—Nadiya Savchenko—from its parliamentary faction in response to her earlier meeting with separatist leaders Aleksandr Zakharchenko (of the Donetsk People's Republic) and Igor Plotnitsky (of the Luhansk People's Republic). The party saw this meeting as "negotiations with terrorists" and "adamantly opposed" it.

==== 2015 local elections ====
According to the Central Election Commission, the results of local elections in 2015 resulted in Batkivshchyna placing second in Ukraine. Batkivshchyna was represented by 8,016 deputies in local councils, and by 369 deputies as heads of villages, towns and cities. In comparison to the 2014 parliamentary elections, Batkivshchyna was able to increase its representation by 250%.

==== 2016–2017 local elections ====
In 2016 and 2017, Ukraine held local elections in united territorial communities. According to the results of four big local elections, Batkivshchyna took premier place among political parties (number of local deputies elected to local councils).

According to the Central Electoral Committee of Ukraine, on elections to local councils held on 11 December 2016, "Batkivshchyna" received 14.34% of votes (120 deputies); on 18 December 2016 – 16.17% (515 deputies); on 30 April 2017 – 17.99% (197 deputies); on 29 October 2017 – 20.33% (901 deputies).

=== 2019 presidential election and parliamentary election ===
Top 10 Batkivshchyna candidates in the 2019 parliamentary elections
- Yulia Tymoshenko
- Serhiy Taruta
- Valentyn Nalyvaichenko
- Serhiy Sobolev
- Olena Kondratiuk
- Ivan Kyrylenko
- Andriy Kozhemyakin
- Hryhoriy Nemyria
- Serhiy Vlasenko
- Valeriy Dubil

Results of the 2019 elections

In the presidential election of March 2019, Yulia Tymoshenko stood as presidential candidate for Batkivshchyna, scoring 13.40 percent (2,532,452 votes) and not reaching the second turn. She endorsed neither Zelenskyy nor Poroshenko.

In the July 2019 Ukrainian parliamentary election, the top 5 of the party list were Tymoshenko, Serhiy Taruta, Valentyn Nalyvaichenko, Serhiy Sobolyev, and Olena Kondratyuk. In early June, Tymoshenko announced that the party will not be part of opposition to President Zelenskyy if it is not included in the ruling coalition formed after the next elections. In the snap parliamentary election of 2019 Batkivschyna slightly improved its performance, scoring 8.18% (1,196,303) and electing 26 MPs. The party abstained from the confidence vote to the new Honcharuk Government, but ensured it would support the government from outside. However, on 13 November 2019, the party went into opposition.

=== Parliamentary activity in the Verkhovna Rada of the IX convocation (2019–present) ===
The Batkivshchyna faction in the Verkhovna Rada of the ninth convocation has 24 deputies. The head of the faction is Yulia Tymoshenko, and the first deputy is Sergei Sobolev. The faction was created on 29 August 2019.

On the first day of the 9th convocation of the Verkhovna Rada, Tymoshenko's faction supported the bill on lifting parliamentary immunity.

On 3 September 2019, Batkivshchyna supported the referral to the Constitutional Court of a bill to reduce the number of deputies.

In November 2019, after the parliament passed a bill to lift the moratorium on land sales, the leader of the Batkivshchyna faction Yulia Tymoshenko announced her transition to opposition to the ruling Servant of the People party.

On 18 November 2019, Tymoshenko appealed to the Constitutional Court to immediately consider the petition for the bill on the "land market".

In December 2019, Tymoshenko united more than 40 political and public organizations that oppose the sale of land in the National Headquarters for the Protection of Native Land. On 15 December 2019, the National Headquarters approved demands to President Volodymyr Zelenskyy that it be necessary to postpone the adoption of "land laws", extend the moratorium and announce a referendum. The National Corps also joined the all-Ukrainian protest action initiated by the National Headquarters for the Protection of the Motherland.

On 19 December 2019, Yulia Tymoshenko and Batkivshchyna deputies addressed the National Anti-Corruption Bureau of Ukraine with a statement pointing to conflicts of interest and corruption in the Parliamentary Committee on Agrarian Policy during the consideration of the law on land sales.

On 11 January 2021, Tymoshenko called on the authorities to provide Ukrainians with gas at a price no higher than the purchase price. According to Tymoshenko, the price of gas should not exceed ₴3, in this regard, Batkivshchyna registered a bill in parliament No. 1177.

On 29 January 2021, the Batkivshchyna faction registered in the Verkhovna Rada a draft law "On Amendments to the Law of Ukraine "On the Natural Gas Market" (regarding the direction of natural gas accumulated during the unheated period and domestic production for the needs of the population)"

In November 2020, Tymoshenko's party supported the all-Ukrainian SaveFOP campaign by registering Bill 3853-2 to simplify the taxation system for small businesses. Tymoshenko signed a memorandum of cooperation with the public movement SaveFOP.

On 27 January 2021, Tymoshenko initiated a referendum on five issues: the supply of Ukrainian gas and nuclear electricity to the population with a 30% profitability; on the sale of agricultural land; on the sale of strategic property; the issue of legalization of cannabis; about the gambling business. At the same time, Zelensky criticized Tymoshenko's referendum, although he himself initiated a nationwide poll on five issues, as well as the strengthening of democracy in Ukraine.

On 1 March 2021, the Batkivshchyna party demanded that the Government stop importing electricity from Russia and Belarus to Ukraine and launch an investigation into the matter. According to Tymoshenko, the import of Belarusian and Russian electricity threatens the national security of the country.

On 16 June 2021, Batkivshchyna appealed to the president at an all-Ukrainian veche, in which they called for a referendum on the land issue. The appeal contains a demand to abolish and not enact the already adopted legislative acts on the circulation of agricultural land, as well as to introduce a moratorium on the adoption of such legislation – until the appropriate decision of the referendum. The party opened a "hot" telephone line to help citizens in matters of the "land market". The party opened a "hot" telephone line to help citizens in matters of the "land market".

On 21 July 2021, the Batkivshchyna party developed a draft of the new Constitution of Ukraine, which provides for the division of powers into four branches: legislative, executive, judicial and control.

On 28 September 2021, the Batkivshchyna faction registered in the Verkhovna Rada a draft resolution on the creation of an interim commission of inquiry to investigate the activities of NJSC Naftogaz of Ukraine and to investigate the critical situation in the field of tariff setting, which arose as a result of the actions of officials of this company.

On 18 October 2021, the Batkivshchyna faction announced a demand for the authorities to declare a state of emergency in the energy sector and proposed an urgent plan to avoid the crisis and calmly pass the heating season for.

On 24 January 2022, the Batkivshchyna Party proposed the creation of a national unity government in Ukraine to overcome the economic crisis in the country.

On 27 January 2022, the Verkhovna Rada adopted a resolution initiated by MPs from the Batkivshchyna faction to establish a Temporary Commission of Inquiry to investigate possible corruption, which caused significant losses to the state budget, including NJSC Naftogaz. The leader of the Tymoshenko faction became a member of this TSC.

On 1 March 2022, during the Russian invasion of Ukraine, Tymoshenko took custody of the Okhmatdyt children's hospital. Tymoshenko donated medicines and essentials to the institution. Tymoshenko also helps to take sick children out of Kyiv and the region to continue treatment and medical care abroad and in the western regions of the country.

On 18 March 2022, Tymoshenko created the Center for Humanitarian Aid in Batkivshchyna to help vulnerable groups of the population and the Ukrainian military.

On 20 June 2022, in the Verkhovna Rada, the only Batkivshchyna faction did not support the ratification of the Istanbul Convention.

On 19 July 2022, at a closed meeting of the Verkhovna Rada, the Batkivshchyna faction prevented the consideration by the Verkhovna Rada of bills on the allocation of 264 billion budget hryvnias for Naftogaz of Ukraine. Speaking from the rostrum of the parliament, Tymoshenko published information confirming the corruption component of the package of government bills 7427 and 7429 submitted for consideration, which introduced an opaque scheme for the purchase of natural gas by Naftogaz. After that, the Verkhovna Rada sent these initiatives for a second second reading.

On 29 July 2022, the Verkhovna Rada voted for the legislative initiative of Tymoshenko on the creation of a Temporary Special Commission to Investigate the Crisis in the Energy Market of Ukraine.

==== 2022 Russian invasion of Ukraine ====
On 30 June 2023, the Batkivshchyna faction did not vote for Law No. 8401, which cancels tax benefits for small and medium-sized businesses and introduces fines for working without cash registers.

On 6 July 2023, the Batkivshchyna team, led by leader Yulia Tymoshenko, announced the creation of a volunteer program to provide the Ukrainian military with new medical aid vehicles.

On 7 July 2023, the Batkivshchyna faction called on the Verkhovna Rada of Ukraine to adopt a resolution on the introduction of a moratorium on any changes to the borders of the Chernobyl zones.

On 12 July 2023, the Batkivshchyna faction registered in the Parliament a draft law «On adoption of a decision on the cultivation/production (cultivation) and other circulation of cannabis plants in Ukraine exclusively through an all-Ukrainian referendum».

On 15 July 2023, Batkivshchyna became the only faction in the Verkhovna Rada that did not vote for draft law No. 7457 on the legalization of marijuana. Tymoshenko said that this law will turn Ukraine into a plantation for the drug business.

On 18 July 2023, Yulia Tymoshenko handed over a modern resuscitation vehicle for the Armed Forces of Ukraine to military doctors.

On 1 August 2023, the Batkivshchyna faction registered draft law No. 9550 in the Verkhovna Rada of Ukraine, which will allow to triple the allocation of funds for the treatment of wounded Ukrainian soldiers.

In September 2023, Batkivshchyna created a Temporary Special Commission (TSC) on the conditions of treatment of wounded soldiers, headed by Yulia Tymoshenko.

At the end of September 2023, Batkivshchyna brought humanitarian aid for doctors in Toretsk and Pokrovsk, in the Donetsk region.

On 15 November 2023, Batkivshchyna was accepted into the international association of political parties of the Centrist Democrat International.

On 25 April 2024, Batkivshchyna spoke in the parliament against the introduction of a accumulative pension system based on private pension funds in Ukraine.

On 25 April 2024, the Batkivshchyna faction submitted to the Verkhovna Rada a resolution on the settlement of the issue of providing consular services to Ukrainians abroad.

12 July 2024, Batkivshchyna handed over 25 trucks with humanitarian aid to the Ukrainian military at the front.

On 23 October 2024, the Constitutional Court of Ukraine considered the submission of Batkivshchyna regarding the draft law on the land market. Party leader Yulia Tymoshenko spoke at the court.

On 3 December 2024, Batkivshchyna prepared a submission to the Constitutional Court of Ukraine and will challenge the laws that deprive the country of sovereignty. In particular, this concerns the formation of the Constitutional Court, the High Council of Justice, the Accounting Chamber of Ukraine, the High Qualification Commission, customs, etc.

On 27 December 2024, Batkivshchyna filed a complaint with the National Anti-Corruption Bureau of Ukraine about a criminal offense in the actions of the State Property Fund of Ukraine, which put up for privatization the operating and profitable enterprise United Mining and Chemical Company.

On 26 February 2025, the people's deputies of Batkivshchyna paid a working visit to the Kharkiv and Donetsk regions and provided military assistance to the Armed Forces of Ukraine.

On 30 April 2025, the Congress of the European People's Party in Valencia adopted a resolution in support of Ukraine, with Batkivshchyna among the initiators of the document.

Since September 2025, with the support of Yulia Tymoshenko, Batkivshchyna has launched a "hotline" to help veterans and military personnel.

On 1 October 2025, the Batkivshchyna faction achieved the creation of a working group in the Verkhovna Rada of Ukraine that will prepare a law on significantly improving the treatment, prosthetics, and rehabilitation of wounded soldiers.

On 9 October 2025, the Batkivshchyna faction supported a bill on social protection for military personnel released from captivity.

On 22 October 2025, the Verkhovna Rada supported the amendment from Batkivshchyna, which concerned the reprofiling of Ukraine's debt to the National Bank, and as a result, the state budget will receive an additional 175 billion hryvnias.

On 4 November 2025, the Verkhovna Rada of Ukraine supported Bill No. 14052, submitted by the "Batkivshchyna" faction, on the legal status and medical care of military personnel.

On 18 November 2025, Batkivshchyna began collecting signatures for the resignation of the Cabinet of Ministers due to a corruption scandal in the energy sector of Ukraine.

On 17 December 2025, the Verkhovna Rada of Ukraine adopted Bill No. 14052, initiated by "Batkivshchyna", on improving the legal status of foreign military personnel.

On 9 April 2026, the Verkhovna Rada of Ukraine adopted Bill No. 13705 of the "Batkivshchyna" faction, which solves the problem of pensionable service for displaced persons and military personnel.

On 5 June 2026, the European Parliament adopted a document in support of the leader of the Batkivshchyna party, Yulia Tymoshenko. In the document, the European Parliament calls on the Ukrainian authorities to avoid politically motivated persecution of opposition figures.

On 13 July 2026, the Centrist Democrat International unanimously adopted the resolution "On the Protection of Ukraine's Sovereignty, Democracy and Political Pluralism", proposed by the Batkivshchyna party. The document states that the persecution of the leader of the opposition party "Batkivshchyna" Yulia Tymoshenko is incompatible with the principles of the rule of law and political pluralism and weakens the unity of Ukraine in the face of Russian aggression.

On 19 August 2026, the Verkhovna Rada of Ukraine adopted Bill No. 13704-d, developed by people's deputies from "Batkivshchyna", which will provide proper, free medical care, rehabilitation, and high-quality prosthetics for Ukrainian servicemen, veterans, and prisoners of war released from captivity.

=== 2020 local elections ===
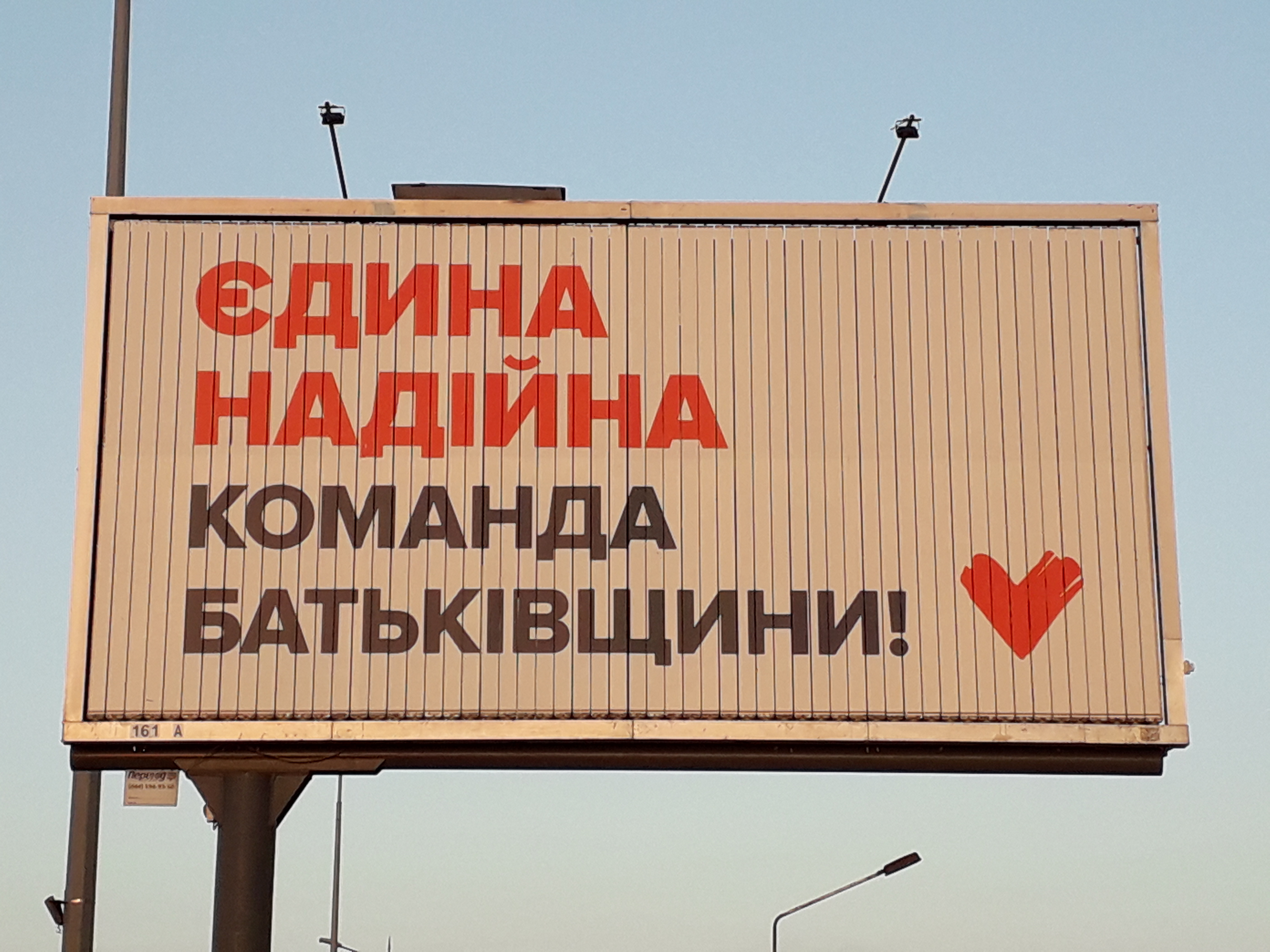
Fatherland billboard in Kyiv during the 2020 local elections: "Team Batkivshchyna is your only hope!"

According to the results of the CEC, Batkivshchyna, which received 4,093 deputy mandates (12.39%), became one of the party leaders in the 2020 Ukrainian local elections. 7.24% of the elected mayor of a village, town or city was a member of Batkivshchyna.

== Ideology and stances ==
A comparative analysis of Batkivshchyna's election programs between 2002 and 2012 reveals some changes. However, the overall political orientation can be identified as weakly articulated, with a slight dominance of the "left" vector due to "left" statements belonging to the sphere of "social policy". Economically, the party developed the concept of "solidarism" as a third way between capitalism and socialism.

The party is classified as overall centre-left by Razumkov Centre as well as political scientists such as Mats Öhlén of the Centre for European Policy Studies. According to Öhlén, the party has a "clearly left-leaning party profile", and despite expressing both centre-left and centre-right stances, Batkivshchyna implemented a series leftist policies that were "hardly in line with a centre-right position". The party is a collection of different ideological groups and also includes socialist and social-democrats; Batkivshchyna also expressed interest in joining the Party of European Socialists, and shocked the pundits by eventually settling with the European People's Party instead.

Batkivshchyna supports the social democratic model of the economy and advocates for significant social guarantees and the need to reduce the social polarization between the rich and poor in Ukraine. Additionally, the party also supports the introduction of a luxury tax, opposes privatization of state-owned enterprises as well as the agriculture. In regards to trade, the Batkivshchyna promotes a protectionist system that would protect national industries.

The party manifesto archived in 2016 claims that it seeks to instill in Ukraine national, democratic, and Christian values, held together through reformation, spirituality, patriotism, national solidarity, responsibility, rights and freedoms. The party advocates transforming Ukraine into a competitive nation-state based on a western Europe model of justice and welfare.

According to the party, only citizens of Ukraine will have the right to private ownership of land, but that "high concentration of land ownership by one person" will be forbidden.

The party sees Ukrainian membership in the European Union as a strategic goal. It favours visa-free travel for Ukrainians to the EU and intends to "cancel humiliating visa regimes". It would like to see "a mutually beneficial and equitable agreement on the establishment of free trade with Russia". In June 2013, the party's parliamentary faction voted for the denunciation of the 2010 Ukrainian–Russian Naval Base for Natural Gas treaty. (Note: In June 2013 Ukraine's First Deputy Foreign Minister Ruslan Demchenko stated a unilateral denunciation of the 2010 Ukrainian–Russian Naval Base for Natural Gas treaty was not possible from a legal point of view.)

The party's 2012 election program did not mention NATO, but its 2014 program stated that the party wants to annul Ukraine's non-aligned status and that it wants Ukraine to become a member of NATO.

The party is in favour of party-list proportional representation elections with open lists. It Tymoshenko initiated a referendum on five issues: the supply of Ukrainian gas and nuclear electricity to the population with a 30% profitability; on the sale of agricultural land; on the sale of strategic property; the issue of legalization of cannabis; about the gambling business.

The party also states that government grants should be awarded to graduates who successfully passed testing for studies at Ukrainian universities.

It proposes a health system that has mandatory health inspections and gradual development of a voluntary health insurance system funded by employers.

The party wants to introduce jury trials into the Ukrainian law system and wants to "depoliticise" the process of appointment of judges. It also wants an independent judiciary that will increase the role of the Supreme Court of Ukraine. The Constitutional Court of Ukraine, "which has compromised itself with decisions that were ordered (by the Yanukovych administration)" should be liquidated. It wants the criminal code to be "Europeanized" and law enforcement brought under civil control.

The party wants to improve human rights in Ukraine.

The party regards the Holodomor as a genocide of the Ukrainian nation.

Before their removal of power in February 2014, the party sought to impeach former President Viktor Yanukovych and his "anti-people regime" to "return Ukraine to the path of European integration", while trying to reverse the former Azarov Government policy of raising the status of the Russian language.

On 15 May 2016, "Fatherland" prepared a statement in the name of the new Prosecutor General in connection with offenses in the activities of the National Commission, which performs state regulation in the energy and utilities relative to the unjustified increase of gas prices for the population.

On 23 May 2016, All-Ukrainian Union "Fatherland" launched a website called "Fair rates", which promotes the idea of establishing fair gas tariffs for the population.

In the parliament, Batkivshchyna advocates ban on agricultural land sales. The party also insists on adopting laws on development of Ukrainian agriculture. On 31 March 2016, Parliament adopted the law on family farms initiated by the party Batkivshchyna.

The party advocates decreasing of tariffs on housing and utility services for people, because they are set up too high artificially. On 21 April 2015, Yulia Tymoshenko initiated a working group to check the validity of utility tariffs. "Fatherland" party has made the reduction of tariffs for housing and communal services.

Batkivshchyna advocates strengthening the struggle against corruption—namely deoffshorization and independence of anti-corruption government bodies.

The party is also against selling and privatization of the state's strategic objects.

On 1 March 2021, the party in the Verkhovna Rada demanded to submit to parliament a draft law banning the import of electricity from Russia and Belarus. According to Tymoshenko, imports of Belarusian and Russian electricity threaten the country's national security.

== Associated and merged parties ==
=== Associated in electoral block ===
- (2002–2012) Ukraine – Forward! as the Ukrainian Social Democratic Party
- (2002–2006) Ukrainian Platform "Assembly" as the Ukrainian People's Party "Assembly"
- (2002–2006) Ukrainian Republican Party (temporary merger with Assembly)
- (2007–2012) Reforms and Order Party

=== Merged ===
- (2001) Ukrainian Conservative Republican Party
- (2005–2007) Party of Free Democrats as Apple (temporarily)
- (2012) Reforms and Order Party, People's Self-Defense, Front for Change, People's Movement of Ukraine, For Ukraine!, Social Christian Party, Civil Position (members of this party were on its election list in the 2012 Ukrainian parliamentary election)
- (2013) Reforms and Order Party and Front for Change

== Election results ==
=== Verkhovna Rada ===
Year	Votes	%	Position	Seats won	±	Government
2002	With Yulia Tymoshenko Bloc		5th	22 / 450		Opposition (2002–2005)
2002	With Yulia Tymoshenko Bloc		5th	22 / 450		Leading government (2005)
2002	With Yulia Tymoshenko Bloc		5th	22 / 450		Opposition (2005–2006)
2006	With Yulia Tymoshenko Bloc		▲2nd	129 / 450	▲107	Opposition
2007	With Yulia Tymoshenko Bloc		2nd	156 / 450	▲27	Leading government (2007–2010)
2007	With Yulia Tymoshenko Bloc		2nd	156 / 450	▲27	Opposition (2010–2012)
2012	5,208,402	25.54%	2nd	101 / 450	▼55	Opposition
2014	893,549	5.68%	▼6th	19 / 450	▼82	Coalition government (2014–2015)
2014	893,549	5.68%	▼6th	19 / 450	▼82	Opposition (2015–2019)
2019	1,158,189	8.18%	▲3rd	26 / 450	▲7	External support (2019)
2019	1,158,189	8.18%	▲3rd	26 / 450	▲7	Opposition (since November 2019)

=== Presidential elections ===
Year	Candidate	First round			Second round		Result
Year	Candidate	Votes	%	Rank	Votes	%	Result
2004	Supported Viktor Yushchenko						
2010	Yulia Tymoshenko	6,159,610	25.05%	2nd	11,593,357	45.47%	Lost
2014	Yulia Tymoshenko	2,310,050	12.81%	2nd			Lost
2019	Yulia Tymoshenko	2,532,452	13.40%	3rd			Lost

=== Local councils ===
Election	Performance				Rank
Election	%	± pp	Seats	+/–	Rank
2015	5.12%	New	8,004 / 158,399	New	3rd
2020	10.53%	▲5.41	4,468 / 43,122	▼3536	3rd

== Young Batkivshchyna ==
The Young Batkivshchyna is the youth wing of the party. It was established in 2007 and has cells in all regions of Ukraine. It has been a member of the International Union of Young Democrats since 2009 and the youth of the European People's Party since 2011. The head of the organization was Sergey Mitrofansky as of September 2021.

The leader of the Batkivshchyna party introduced a competition for talented Ukrainian students to receive a scholarship named after Yulia Tymoshenko, who will enter the Nova School of Business and Economics in Portugal.

== See also ==
- Category:Batkivshchyna politicians
