= Yulia Tymoshenko Bloc =

Political alliance in Ukraine

Yulia Tymoshenko Bloc Блок Юлії Тимошенко
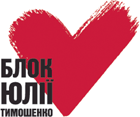
- Leader: Yulia Tymoshenko
- First Deputy: Oleksandr Turchynov
- Parliamentary leader: Andriy Kozhemiakin
- Founder: Yulia Tymoshenko
- Founded: 9 February 2001
- Dissolved: 15 December 2012
- Preceded by: National Salvation Committee
- Succeeded by: Dictatorship Resistance Committee
- Headquarters: Kyiv
- Ideology: Social democracy; Populism; Civic nationalism; Solidarism; National Democracy; Pro-Europeanism
- Political position: Big tent
- Colours: Maroon

Website
- ba.org.ua
- Politics of Ukraine; Political parties; Elections^{1}The alliance contained different political groups with diverging ideological outlooks

The Yulia Tymoshenko Bloc (Ukrainian: Блок Юлії Тимошенко, БЮТ; Blok Yuliyi Tymoshenko, BYuT) was the name of the bloc of political parties in Ukraine led by Yulia Tymoshenko since 2001. In November 2011, the participation of blocs of political parties in parliamentary elections was banned. The core party of the alliance, Batkivshchyna, remained a major force in Ukrainian politics.

== Overview ==
Founded for the 2002 parliamentary elections, the alliance attracted most of its voters from western Ukrainian (Ukrainian speaking) provinces (oblasts) and from central Ukraine. The alliance had low support in the east and the south of Ukraine (where the Russian language is dominant). though they did recruit several politicians from these Russian-speaking provinces like Crimea (Lyudmyla Denisova) and Luhansk Oblast (Natalia Korolevska). The alliance was often associated with the 2004 Orange Revolution (the alliance's leader, Yulia Tymoshenko, was one of the leaders of the Orange Revolution) and thus named "Orange Party" in media publications. The alliance also had prominent members who had been associated with the opponents of the Orange Revolutions (the "Blue camp") including Ivan Kyrylenko, the former faction leader of the Bloc Yulia Tymoshenko (BYuT) in the Ukrainian Parliament. Other notable BYuT deputies were Soviet dissident Levko Lukyanenko and former UNA-UNSO leader Andriy Shkil.

BYuT had intended to include more representatives from the education sector into its voting lists. According to Tymoshenko: "Certain branches and sectors have powerful lobbies. And there are only three to four lobbyists who represent the spheres of education and health care in the Verkhovna Rada [Ukrainian parliament]. Therefore some sectors lack financing, while others have excessive funding".

According to Tymoshenko, representatives of business had no dominant influence on decision making in her political force. "Business is represented in the parliament, but it doesn't shape politics this is what distinguishes my political force from the Party of Regions for instance." Several billionaires have been members of the BYuT faction in the Verkhovna Rada.

== History ==
=== Creation ===
In January 2001, President Leonid Kuchma dismissed Tymoshenko from the post of Deputy Prime Minister for fuel and energy sector in the cabinet of Viktor Yushchenko. Following this, and during the Ukraine without Kuchma-protests, Tymoshenko began the loose organisation the National Salvation Committee on 9 February 2001. This organisation later merged into the Yulia Tymoshenko Bloc (BYuT) in November 2001.

The Organization for Security and Co-operation in Europe noted at the time that there were physical assaults and harassment of candidates and campaign workers associated with the BYuT, and other opposition parties leading up to the March 2002 election. The BYuT itself complained of campaign-related violations including "an informal 'media blackout,' [and] negatively slanted coverage".

At the parliamentary elections on 30 March 2002, the alliance comprised the following liberal and nationalist member parties:

- Fatherland Party (Partiya Bat'kivshchyna ), also rendered as All-Ukrainian Union "Fatherland" (Vseukrajins’ke Ob’ednannja Bat’kivščyna) (13 berths)
- Ukrainian Republican Party "Sobor" (Ukrajins’ka Respublikanska Partija Sobor) (3 berths)
- Ukrainian Social Democratic Party (Ukrajins’ka Social-Demokratyčna Partija) (3 berths)
- Ukrainian Republican Party (Ukrajinska Respublikanska Partija) (1 berth)
- Non-partisan (2 berths)

Top 10 members

- Yulia Tymoshenko (Fatherland Party)
- Anatoliy Matviyenko (Ukrainian Republican Party "Sobor")
- Hryhoriy Omelchenko (Ukrainian Republican Party "Sobor")
- Vasyl Onopenko (Ukrainian Social Democratic Party)
- Levko Lukyanenko (Ukrainian Republican Party)
- Oleh Bilorus (Fatherland Party)
- Oleksandr Turchynov (Fatherland Party)
- Mykhailo Pavlovsky (Fatherland Party)
- Petro Tolochko (Fatherland Party)
- Stepan Khmara (Fatherland Party)

The bloc won 7.2% of the popular vote and 22 out of 450 seats. This result was better than expected, because BYuT had limited access to the media and limited support from local authorities.

The alliance supported Viktor Yushchenko during the Ukrainian presidential election of 2004, and played an active role in the widespread acts of civil non-violent protest that became known as the Ukrainian Orange Revolution.

In January 2005, Tymoshenko became Prime Minister of Ukraine under Yushchenko's presidency.

The party had lost a few seats in 2002 and 2003, but doubled to 40 members of parliament in September 2005.

=== Electoral breakthrough ===
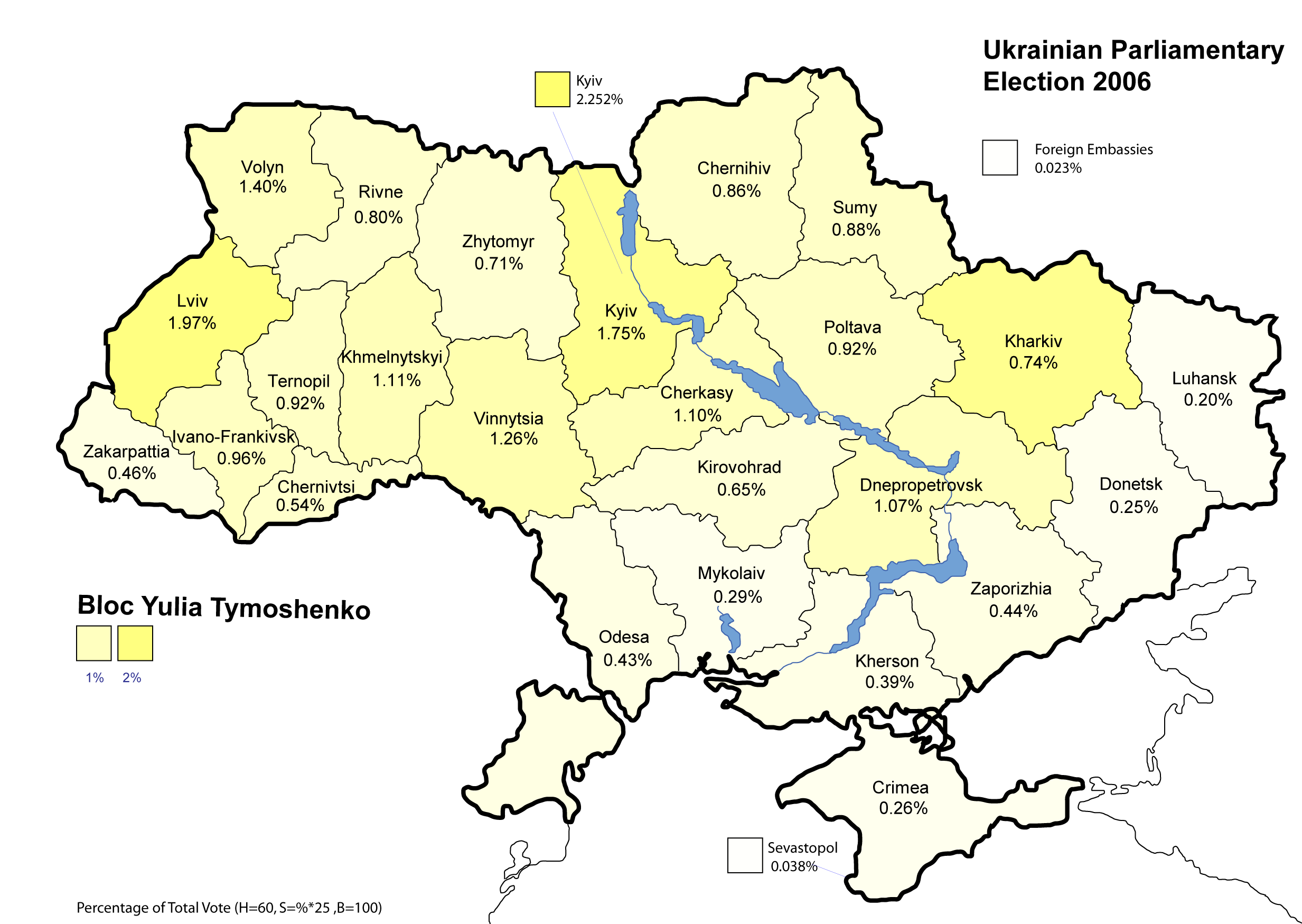
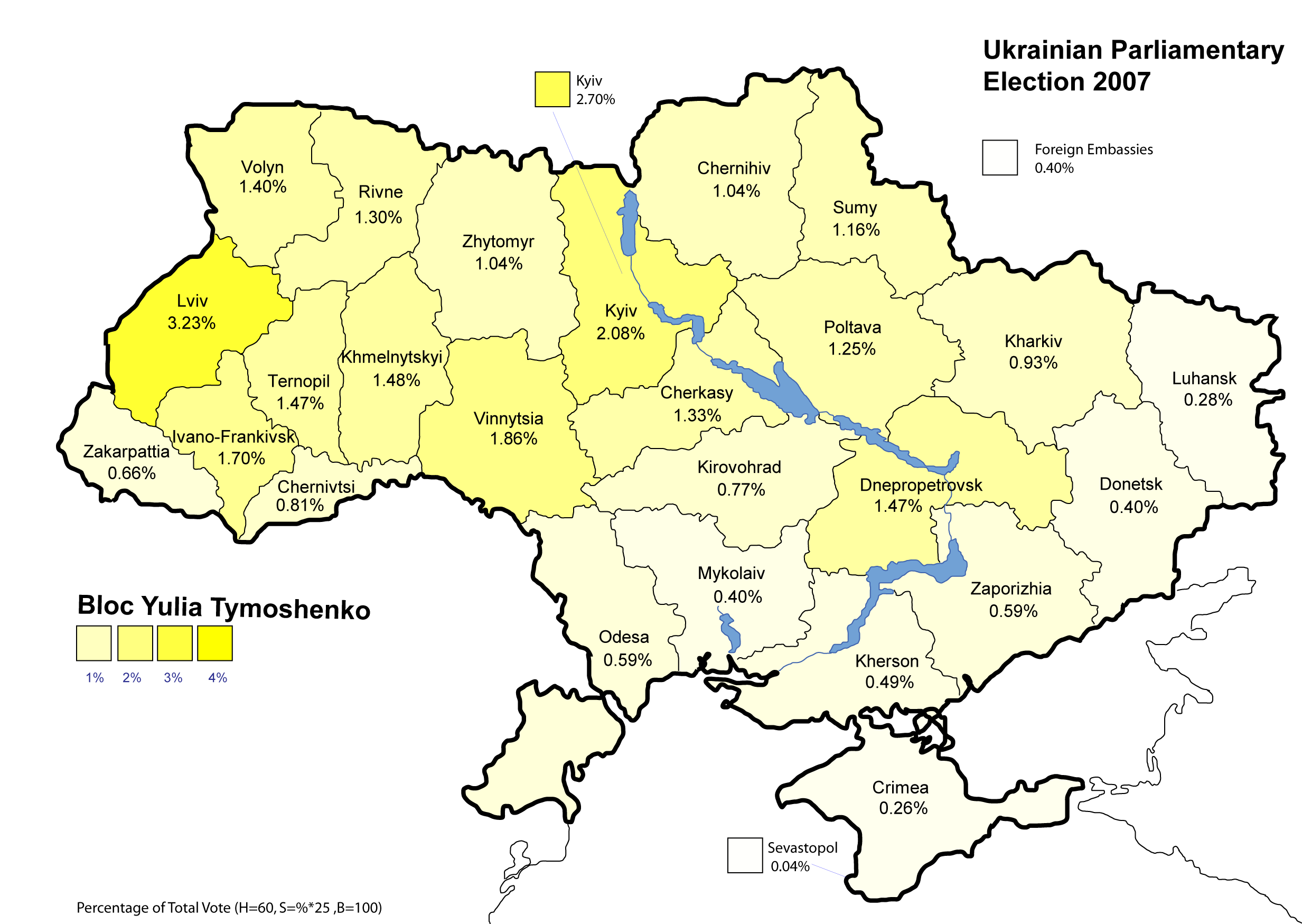
Map showing the results of BYuT (% of total national vote) per region for the 2006 parliamentary election (above) and the 2007 parliamentary election (below).

The BYuT entered the parliamentary elections on 26 March 2006, with only Fatherland and Ukrainian Social Democratic Party after both republican parties left the alliance. Nonetheless, BYuT moved into second place with 22.27% of the vote behind Party of Regions with 33% and ahead of Our Ukraine with less than 14% support. BYuT won 129 seats out of 450.

Note that after the 2002 merger of the Ukrainian Republican Party "Sobor" and the Ukrainian Republican Party – which then became known as the Ukrainian Republican Party "Sobor" (URP Sobor) – the party went through a schism before the 2006 elections. The majority of the party led by Anatoliy Mativienko aligned with Our Ukraine Bloc, while others left the party and stayed with BYuT. After the 2006 elections, Levko Lukyanenko managed to reinstate the original Ukrainian Republican Party.

Top 10 members

- Yulia Tymoshenko (Fatherland Party)
- Oleksandr Turchynov (Fatherland Party)
- Mykola Tomenko (Fatherland Party)
- Vasyl Onopenko (Ukrainian Social Democratic Party)
- Andriy Shevchenko (unaffiliated)
- Levko Lukyanenko (unaffiliated)
- Hryhoriy Omelchenko (unaffiliated)
- Vitaliy Kurylo (unaffiliated)
- Mykola Petruk (unaffiliated)
- Yevhen Suslov (unaffiliated)

It was widely expected that a coalition between supporters of the Orange Movement would form Ukraine's next government, but after three months of negotiations and a failure to reach an agreement the proposed coalition collapsed following the decision of the Socialist Party of Ukraine to support the formation of the "anti-crisis coalition" with Party of Regions and the Communist Party of Ukraine.

During the 2007 parliamentary elections, the BYuT consisted of:

- All-Ukrainian Union "Fatherland"
- Ukrainian Social Democratic Party
- Reforms and Order Party

The Ukrainian Republican Party "Sobor" was part of the Our Ukraine–People's Self-Defense Bloc in this election.

Top 10 members

- Yulia Tymoshenko (Fatherland Party)
- Oleksandr Turchynov (Fatherland Party)
- Mykola Tomenko (Fatherland Party)
- Yosyp Vinsky (Fatherland Party)
- Andriy Shevchenko (unaffiliated)
- Viktor Pynzenyk (Reforms and Order Party)
- Hryhoriy Omelchenko (Fatherland Party)
- Vitaliy Kurylo (Fatherland Party)
- Mykola Petruk (unaffiliated)
- Yevhen Korniychuk (Ukrainian Social Democratic Party)

In the parliamentary elections on 30 September 2007, the bloc won 156 of 450 seats (and thus 30.71% of the total votes), securing an additional 1.5 million votes (8.24%) in comparison with the 2006 election. Most of this vote swing came as a result of consolidation in regions where BYuT had already been the leading party. Statistics published by Ukraine's Central Electoral Commission indicate that most of the swing came from minor parties with some voters turning away from the Socialist Party and to a lesser extent Our Ukraine.

On 15 October 2007, Our Ukraine–People's Self-Defense Bloc and the Yulia Tymoshenko Bloc agreed to form a majority coalition in the new parliament of the 6th convocation. On 29 November, a coalition was signed between the Yulia Tymoshenko Bloc and Our Ukraine–People's Self-Defense Bloc (OU-PSD) which together had received 45% of the national vote. On 18 December 2007 Yulia Tymoshenko, with a margin of two votes, was elected Prime Minister.

During the 2008 Ukrainian political crisis the BYuT–OU-PSD coalition faltered. There were negotiations between BYuT and Party of Regions to form a coalition but after Volodymyr Lytvyn was elected Chairman of the Verkhovna Rada (parliament) on 9 December 2008, he announced the creation of a coalition between his Lytvyn Bloc, BYuT and OU-PSD. Following negotiations, the three parties officially signed the coalition agreement on 16 December. It was unsure if this coalition would stop the snap election although Speaker Volodymyr Lytvyn predicted that the Verkhovna Rada would work until the next scheduled elections in 2012. President Viktor Yushchenko's decree to dissolve the Verkhovna Rada (parliament) – made during the 2008 Ukrainian political crisis – was never put into action.

On 3 July 2009 the Verkhovna Rada terminated the mandate of BYuT deputy Viktor Lozinskyi. At the time there was a criminal proceeding against Lozinskyi who was suspected of deliberately inflicting grave bodily harm causing death; the Prosecutor-General's Office had applied to the Verkhovna Rada for permission to arrest Lozinskyi. 416 out of 444 deputies registered in Parliament, including 133 deputies of the BYoT, voted for removal of the Lozinskyi's parliamentary immunity.

=== Return to opposition ===
In October 2009, BYuT endorsed Yulia Tymoshenko, then incumbent Prime Minister, as their candidate for the 2010 Presidential election. She was not elected. In the second round of the election she lost to Viktor Yanukovich while gaining 45.47% of the votes; Yanukovich got 48.95% of the votes so Tymoshenko lost by 3.48%.

After the fall of the second Tymoshenko Government on 3 March 2010 (seven BYuT lawmakers had supported the motion of no confidence) BYuT moved into opposition. On 11 March 2010 BYuT appealed to the Central Election Commission of Ukraine to terminate the parliamentary mandates of six parliamentarians who had joined the new parliamentary coalition. Ten representative of BYuT joined the coalition supporting the Azarov Government as an independent MP in April 2010.

On 16 March, a shadow government including BYuT was established.

It late May 2010, BYuT deputies had to submit new applications for faction membership. On 26 June 2010 the Political Council Presidium of All-Ukrainian Union "Fatherland" expelled Oleksandr Feldman, a Verkhovna Rada deputy of the BYuT faction, from the party because he had joined the coalition supporting the Azarov Government the previous month. On 21 September 2010, another 28 members of the faction were officially expelled because they had joined the majority coalition.

On 16 November 2010, the ByuT faction was officially renamed "Bloc Yulia Tymoshenko-Batkivschyna".

By late 2010 the BYuT faction consisted of 113 lawmakers of the original 156 elected in September 2007. Most who left BYuT had become members of the "Stability and Reforms" coalition supporting the Azarov Government (17 of these became founding members of Reforms for the Future in February 2011). Four joined the Party of Regions faction in October 2010 (followed by five others in March 2011). In early February 2011 seven more deputies were expelled from the faction. On 2 February 2011 party-leader Tymoshenko claimed members of the "Bloc Yulia Tymoshenko-Batkivschyna"-faction had been offered money and places in the election list of the Party of Regions and have been blackmailed into voting for laws introduced by the Azarov Government. In 2011, the faction of BYuT lost 11 more deputies. On 29 December 2011, it consisted of 102 deputies.

Alliance leader Tymoshenko was sentenced to seven years in jail in October 2011 on abuse of power charges. Ukrainian President Yanukovych and the Party of Regions have been accused of trying to create a "controlled democracy" in Ukraine, and as a means to this tried to "destroy" main opposition party BYuT, but both have denied this charges.

=== Dissolution ===
In November 2011, the participation of blocs of political parties in parliamentary elections was banned. The People's Self-Defense Political Party merged with All-Ukrainian Union "Fatherland".

"Fatherland" and Reforms and Order Party (with People's Movement of Ukraine) announced to compete one single party list during the parliamentary elections in March 2012. On 7 April 2012 Arseniy Yatsenyuk announced his party Front for Change would join them on this (single) party list.

On 15 March 2012, the Ukrainian Social-Democratic Party was expelled from the bloc for alleged "cooperation with the presidential administration and the ruling regime"; the day before the Ukrainian Social Democratic Party party-leader Natalia Korolevska had been expelled from the "Bloc Yulia Tymoshenko-Batkivschyna"-faction. The Ukrainian Social-Democratic Party had stated in December 2011 "that we are doing nothing that can harm the Bloc of Yulia Tymoshenko... Our task is to collect the most votes in parliament at the 2012 parliamentary elections". On 22 March 2012 the Ukrainian Social-Democratic Party was renamed Party of Natalia Korolevska "Ukraine – Forward!".

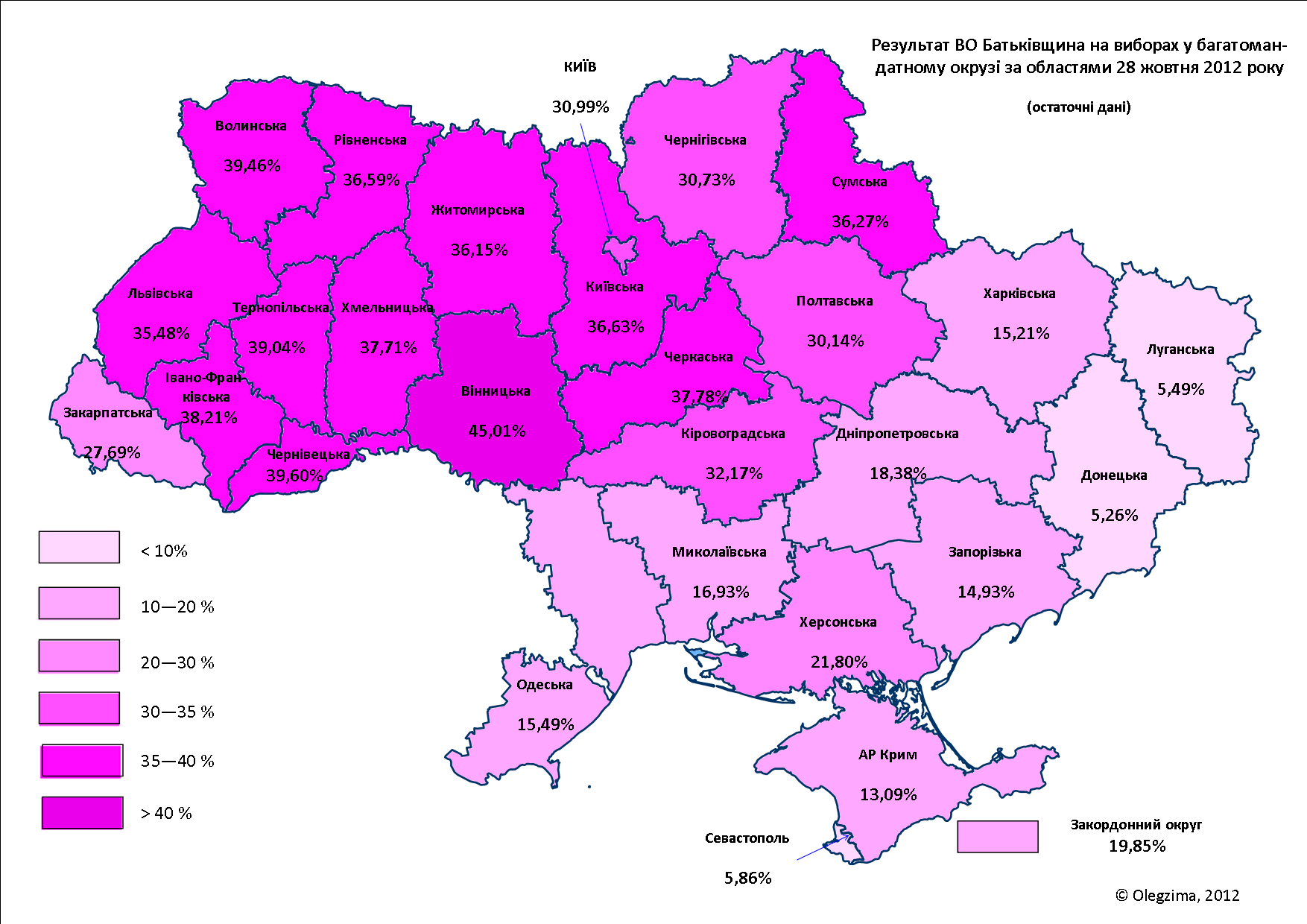
Results for "Fatherland" in the 2012 elections

"Fatherland" became the "umbrella" party with an election list that included members of Reforms and Order Party, People's Movement of Ukraine, Front of Changes, For Ukraine, People's Self-Defense, Civil Position and Social Christian Party. In July 2012, members of the Mejlis of the Crimean Tatar People joined this list. This list named themselves: United Opposition "Fatherland". During the election the list won 62 seats and 25.55% of the votes under the proportional party-list system (falling from 30.71% in 2007 for BYuT) and another 39 by winning 39 simple-majority constituencies. This gave them a total of 101 seats and 22.67% of the 450 seats in the Ukrainian Parliament. The party lost about 2 million voters compared with BYuT's results in the previous election.

By late November 2012 the BYuT faction consisted of 97 lawmakers of the original 156 elected in September 2007.

On 15 June 2013, Reforms and Order Party and Front for Change merged into "Fatherland".

== Ideology ==
The official ideology of the block is solidarism. But the block includes parties with different ideologies: Pro-Europeanism, liberal nationalism and social democracy. The hostile parties claim that the ideology of BYuT is populism.

== Electoral results ==
=== Verkhovna Rada ===
Year	Leader	Votes	%	Position	Seats won	+/-	Government
2002	Yulia Tymoshenko	1,882,087	7.26%	5th	22 / 450		Opposition (2002–2005)
2002	Yulia Tymoshenko	1,882,087	7.26%	5th	22 / 450		Leading government (2005)
2002	Yulia Tymoshenko	1,882,087	7.26%	5th	22 / 450		Opposition (2005–2006)
2006	Yulia Tymoshenko	5,652,876	22.30%	▲2nd	129 / 450	▲107	Opposition
2007	Yulia Tymoshenko	7,162,193	30.72%	2nd	156 / 450	▲27	Leading government (2007–2010)
2007	Yulia Tymoshenko	7,162,193	30.72%	2nd	156 / 450	▲27	Opposition (2010–2012)

=== Presidential elections ===
Year	Candidate	First round			Second round		Result
Year	Candidate	Votes	%	Rank	Votes	%	Result
2004	Supported Viktor Yushchenko						
2010	Yulia Tymoshenko	6,159,610	25.05%	2nd	11,593,357	45.47%	Lost

== Issues ==
The BYuT had advocated the following positions:

- Constitutional reform – BYuT proposed a national referendum on the system of governance (Presidential or Parliamentary) and the adoption a new constitution.
- Justice – The bloc advocated raising salaries for judges and abolishing the requirement for them to hear specific cases. They proposed legal aid schemes for poor citizens so that income would not be the final determinant of judicial representation and consideration.
- Media – The bloc advocated for the creation of public broadcast television, greater transparency and disclosure of ownership of media interests, the establishment of agreements between owners of media outlets and journalists in order to facilitate open and honest editorial policy, and increased Internet availability.
- Corruption – The bloc proposed implementing a systematic program to combat corruption.
- Social reform – The bloc proposed to improve social welfare services while encouraging an expansion of the population. Specific plans included obligatory medical insurance, free state medical services for those in need, affordable medication, a rural doctor program, and increased payments for each newborn child. In addition, there were proposals for increased baby-care allowances and long-term low interest loans for young families.
- Education – The bloc proposed to restore the status and raise the standards of the education system to stop the brain drain problem. Measures included incentives for investment in professional and higher education and in research and development.
- Transit – The bloc proposed to build new oil and gas pipelines and expand public-private partnership investments to improve roads, railways and airports. They advocated a liberalization of the transit system.
- Business – The bloc wished to address the imbalance between large enterprises, which dominate the business sector, and small enterprises by encouraging the growth of wealth-creating small- and medium-sized enterprises. They advocated a new tax code while expanding assessment, minimizing tax remissions, abolishing VAT, and overall simplifying the process to set up and administer businesses. They advocated lower business lending rates in line with European levels, and measures to liberalize banking and insurance services and encourage longer-term lending. Shareholder rights will be protected, the permit system reformed, and the governmental bureaucracy reduced.
- Energy – The bloc sought to overturn the nation's dependence on monopolies for importing energy while strengthening collaboration and coordination of energy policy with the EU. Specific policies included integration with the European market for the supply and consumption of electricity, measures to reduce oil and gas consumption, an increase in utilization of brown coal and the production of synthetic fuel. They wished to complete the Odessa–Brody–Plotsk (Gdańsk) transit pipeline, build a gas transit pipeline linking the Caspian Sea (running through Azerbaijan and Georgia) and the Black Sea, and encourage domestic production both onshore and offshore in the Black and Azov Seas.
- Investment – The bloc encouraged domestic and foreign investment by removing legal barriers and streamlining procedures, particularly for the technology and energy sectors. Other proposals included transparent and open privatization and tender processes and the establishment of a network of regional ombudsman to simplify processes for obtaining import certificates. All new legislation was to be in accordance with WTO practices.
- Construction – BYuT proposed a system of mortgage lending with lower interest rates for house purchases along with government targets for public housing projects. Decentralization to the regional level would facilitate these targets for both housing and commercial facilities. Special tax incentives were envisioned for industrial projects to complement planning for investment described above.
- Agriculture – The bloc advocated a stronger, more profitable and environmentally responsible agricultural sector. Crucial measures included the availability of development funds, agricultural exchanges, insurance funds and land-banks. Other initiatives involved the promotion of agricultural products to overseas markets. To facilitate a functioning land market, agricultural producers would have access to low-interest loans, with incentives for the development of cooperative banks and credit unions in rural areas.

== Relationships with other parties ==
Late May was marked with another story on a boring subject – betrayal, conspiracy, coup d'état, the usurpation of power and other terrible things. This has already become a political characteristic of Ukraine.

— BYuT faction leader Ivan Kyrylenko during a Verkhovna Rada speech, 2 June 2009

Our Ukraine has been the main ally of the Yulia Tymoshenko Bloc (BYuT) during the Orange Revolution and in its aftermath.

Relations with arch-rival Party of Regions (PoR) has always been sour but at times seemed to improve. In 2009 a coalition government between these two seemed to become a reality. But early June talks to build a broad coalition to address the economic crisis collapsed; Yulia Tymoshenko accused PoR leader Viktor Yanukovych of betrayal. At that time, Ukrainian President Viktor Yuschenko showed little enthusiasm for a BYuT–PoR coalition.

Although unrelated to these developments, American analyst Ryan Renicker asserted that allegations of Tymoshenko's alleged wrongdoings are unsubstantiated and misguided. Official documents from both the European Union and the United States suggest Tymoshenko's prosecution and imprisonment were politically motivated.

== See also ==
- Charismatic authority
