= Social Democratic Union (Ukraine) =

Political party in Ukraine

The Social Democratic Union (Ukrainian: Соціал-демократичний Союз) is a political party in Ukraine registered in March 1999.

== History ==
At the 2002 Ukrainian parliamentary election the party was part of the Unity alliance. At the 2006 elections the party participated in the "Lazarenko Bloc" (which consisted of Hromada, "Social Democratic Union" and Social Democratic Party of Ukraine) but this bloc was supported by only 76.950 voters, or 0.30%, and therefore did not make it to parliament. But the block did win third place in the Dnipropetrovsk Oblast council.

The party did not participate in the 2007 Ukrainian parliamentary election. The party planned to participate in the elections (again) in an election bloc with Hromada. But because the Central Election Commission of Ukraine refused to register candidates of Hromada as candidates and because Hromada did not notify the Central Election Commission of the right date of its congress, Hromada could not participate in these elections.

The party did not participate in the 2012 parliamentary elections.
