= Information Ukraine =

Information Ukraine Інформаційна Україна
- Leader: Andrey Kolodyuk
- Founded: 2005
- International affiliation: None
- Colours: White

Website
- www.info.org.ua

The Information Ukraine (Ukrainian: Інформаційна Україна) is a political party in Ukraine registered in March 2005.

== History ==
In the 2006 elections, the party failed as part of "Bloc Borys Olijnyk and Myhailo Syrota" to win parliamentary representation (the Bloc won 0,08% of the votes).

The party did not participate in the 2007 elections.

On February 21, 2010 Strong Ukraine announced that it would leave the parliamentary faction of Lytvyn Bloc and enter into an electoral alliance with the party Information Ukraine creating the Tigipko Bloc. One of the representatives of Lytvyn Bloc, however, noted that the members of parliament from Lytvyn Bloc cannot be recalled from the parliament, because they were elected as part of the parliamentary faction, but they may leave voluntarily if they will surrender their mandates. A March 2010 poll predicted that Strong Ukraine would get 7.3% of the vote at the 2012 Ukrainian parliamentary election. In May 2011 this had shrunk to about 5%. In August 2011 it was announced that Strong Ukraine would merge into Party of Regions. On 17 November 2011 the Ukrainian Parliament approved an election law that banned the participation of blocs of political parties in parliamentary elections.

The party did not participate in the 2012 parliamentary elections. And also not in the 2014 Ukrainian parliamentary election.
