= All-Ukrainian Chornobyl People's Party "For the Welfare and Protection of the People" =

Ukrainian political party registered in 1998

The All-Ukrainian Chornobyl People's Party "For the Welfare and Protection of the People" (Ukrainian: Всеукраїнська Чорнобильська народна партія "За добробут та соціальний захист народу") is a political party in Ukraine registered in October 1998.

== History ==
The party first participated in 2006 Ukrainian parliamentary election as part of the election bloc "People's Power" (Ukrainian: Влада народу) that did not win any seats in the Ukrainian parliament. In the 30 September 2007 elections, the party failed as part of the Ukrainian People's Bloc to win parliamentary representation. The party did not participate in the 2012 parliamentary elections. The party did not participate in the 2014 Ukrainian parliamentary election either.
