= Ihor Sharov =

Ukrainian politician

- Ігор Шаров
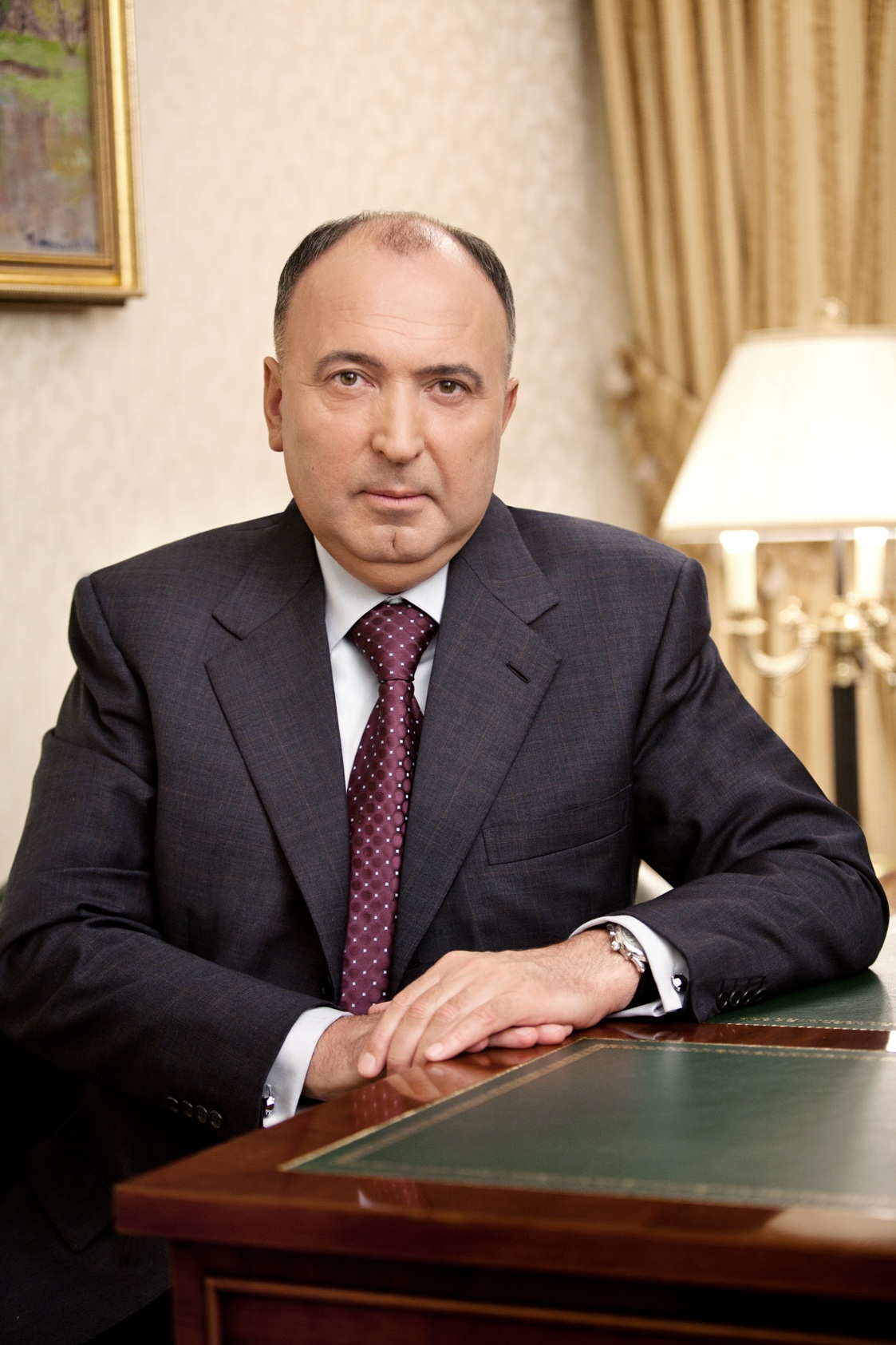
- Sharov in March 2011

Member of the Verkhovna Rada
- In office 23 November 2007 – 27 November 2014

Member of the Verkhovna Rada
- In office 25 December 1998 – 25 May 2006

Member of the Verkhovna Rada
- In office 24 December 1995 – 12 May 1998

Personal details
- Born: Ihor Fedorovych Sharov; 12 August 1946 (age 79) Skalivski Khutory, Ukrainian SSR, Soviet Union
- Party: Party of Regions
- Other political affiliations: Communist Party of Ukraine
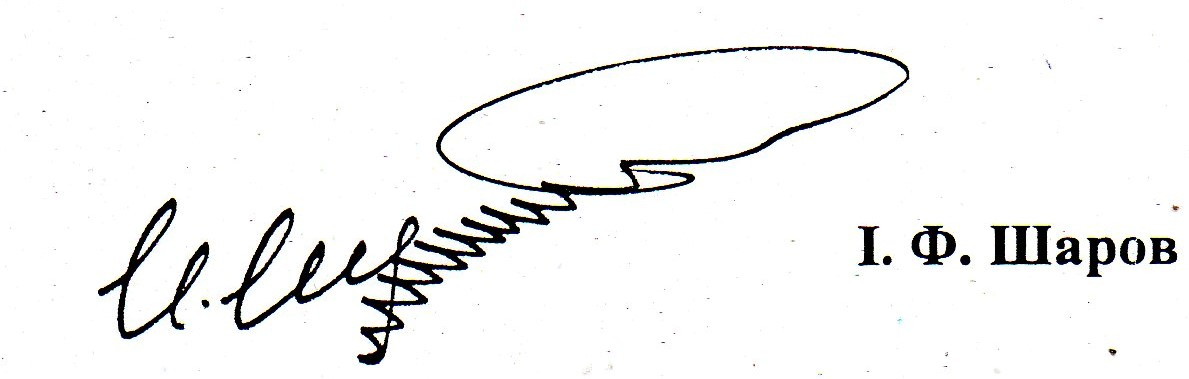
- Signature

Ihor (or Igor) Fedorovych Sharov (Ukrainian: Ігор Шаров) (born 10 August 1961) is a Ukrainian politician, a member of Parliament of Ukraine (MP) and a writer. He was a parliamentary representative of the Lytvyn Bloc in 2006–7, and a leading figure in the Labour Ukraine party. He was instrumental in obtaining compensation for many victims of Nazi persecution. He has written a number of non-fiction works.

== Early years and education ==
Sharov was born on 10 August 1961 in the village Skalivski Khutory of Kropyvnytskyi (former Kirovograd) region, Ukraine. His father, Fedir Makarovych Sharov (1928–1996), was a military officer, and his mother, Mariya Korniyivna Sharova (1937–2009), was a headteacher of a pre-school educational institution. Since 1974 they lived in Kropyvnytskyi (former Kirovograd). The purpose of the move was to give their children a good education.

In 1976, Sharov was sent by Kirovograd military city commissariat to study at the Mukhin Kirovohrad Medical School. He graduated from it in 1980.

In 1987 he majored as a historian and social scientist at the A.S.Pushkin Kirovohrad Pedagogical Institute (now Volodymyr Vynnychenko Central Ukrainian State Pedagogical University) and in 1998 as an economist at the Academy of Labour and Social Affairs (Kyiv).

In 1991 he finished his post-graduate studies at the Kyiv Institute of Foreign Languages. He was a candidate of Historical Sciences and presented a thesis "The working class of Ukraine in the production branch in the age of formation and strengthening of a command economy (end of 20 - 30 years)", defended at the Taras Shevchenko National University of Kyiv.

He served in the Army as a part of the Pskov and Vitebsk air-landing divisions (Afghanistan). As a captain in reserve Ihor Sharov until now maintains close relations with the Afghanistan Veterans of Kropyvnytskyi.

== Labour activity ==
Ihor Sharov worked as a recreation therapist, a head of labor union, a professor in Kirovohrad Pedagogical Institute (now Volodymyr Vynnychenko Central Ukrainian State Pedagogical University).

He headed CEO of "Inkopmark" company (Kropyvnytsky). As a First Vice President Ihor Sharov worked in a Public Joint Stock Company - Corporation "Republic". He was a chairman of the Board of closed JSC “Intergaz” (Kyiv).

Later he became a Permanent Representative of the President of Ukraine in the Verkhovna Rada of Ukraine, advisor of the President of Ukraine, Deputy Minister of the Cabinet of Ministers of Ukraine.

From 1995 to 2014 – Member of the Parliament of Ukraine.

== Parliamentary activity ==
Sharov was member of Parliament of Ukraine of the 2nd convocation, representing Rozdolne election district number 41 in the Autonomous Republic of Crimea (ARC). He was a member of the group "The Constitutional Centre" and the Committee on Fuel and Energy complex, Transport and Communications.

As a member of Parliament of Ukraine of the 3rd convocation, he was a member and a leader of the parliamentary faction "Labour Ukraine" and member of the Committee of Foreign Affairs and Relations with the CIS (March 1999 – 2000: member of the Committee on Foreign Affairs).

As member of Parliament of Ukraine of the 4th convocation, he headed the parliamentary faction "Labour Ukraine" and the People's Bloc of Lytvyn and he was appointed a member of the Committee of Budget.

As a member of Parliament of Ukraine of the 6th convocation, he served as a deputy head of the "Lytvyn Bloc". After the election of Volodymyr Lytvyn as a Chairman of the Verkhovna Rada of Ukraine, Ihor Sharov personally headed the "Lytvyn Bloc". He also became a chairman of the Committee of Human Rights, National Minorities and International Relations.

As a member of Parliament of Ukraine of the 7th convocation, he was a member of the Party of Regions, the parliamentary faction "European sovereign Ukraine", and the Committee of Enterprising, Regulatory and Antimonopoly policy. He was the author and co-author of 194 legislative initiatives.

== Political and civic activity ==
Ihor Sharov contributed to the establishment of the Ukrainian National Fund "Mutual understanding and reconciliation" of the Cabinet of Ministers of Ukraine. He held the position of a Deputy Chairman of the supervisory board of the fund and developed the Law of Ukraine "On victims of Nazism persecution". Together with well-known state and public figures, he obtained financial compensation for almost 650,000 former forced employees, prisoners of concentration camps, and ghettos.

In collaboration with colleagues in deputy corps and professional state officials, he initiated the establishment and adjustment of the activity of Committee on Intellectual Property. He was a vice-president of the All-Ukrainian Association of Intellectual Property and head of the International NGO "International Economic Committee". Sharov was a member of the Interdepartmental Commission on Local Self-Government of the Cabinet of Ministers and the Board of the National Bank of Ukraine. He was an active participant of the constitutional process and a member of the Constitutional Assembly. He served as a member of the Commission on State Awards and Heraldry, and was President of the International Charity Fund "Ukraine".

== Personal life ==
Brother Oleksandr Sharov (1957) – police lieutenant colonel, MIA (Ministry of Internal Affairs) pensioner. Sister Valentyna Sharova (1959) - pensioner. Brother Yurii Sharov (1965) - Police Colonel, MIA pensioner.

His wife Viktoriia Vasylivna (1961) is a musician, choirmaster and chorister. Ihor Sharov has three children. His sons Maksym (1984) - Master of International Law, Stanislav (1988) - Master of International Economics and a daughter Maria (1991) - Master of International Economics.

== Writing ==
Sharov is the author of six volumes:

"100 famous names Ukraine,"

"100 places of interest in Ukraine,"

"100 contemporaries: reflections on Ukraine,"

"Scientists of Ukraine: 100 prominent names,"

"Artists of Ukraine: 100 prominent names,"

"100 personalities of Ukraine (1991-2011)".

Some of his other books include "To believe in yourself" and "The present creates the future", "From dream to the action"; he has also written many scientific and historical-journalistic works.

Author of an article: "Еvents at Мaidan nezalezhnosti of Ukraine in autumn 2013 – winter 2014 (in view of different ukrainian and russian printed media)"

== Creed ==
"If you don't know something, go to the library, you'll find everything there";

"To me, Faith is not just a noun but also a verb" (Jimmy Carter);

"Thinking about state, don't forget about yourself, thinking about yourself – don't forget about the state";

"Reputation, knowledge and efforts give me material benefits".

== Awards ==
- The Order of Prince Yaroslav the Wise IV grade. (2014)[1]
- The Order of Prince Yaroslav the Wise V grade. (2010)[2]
- Order for Merits III, II, I grades.
- Presidium certificate of Verkhovna Rada of USSR, Diploma of Honour of Verkhovna Rada of Ukraine, Diploma of Honour of the Cabinet of Ministers of Ukraine
- Military awards and awards of foreign states.
