= Dmytro Kostiuk =

Ukrainian journalist and politician

- Дмитро Костюк
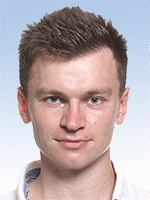
- Official portrait, 2019

People's Deputy of Ukraine
- Incumbent
- Assumed office 29 August 2019
- Preceded by: Volodymyr Lytvyn
- Constituency: Zhytomyr Oblast, No. 65

Personal details
- Born: 1 June 1993 (age 33) Novohrad-Volynskyi (now Zviahel), Ukraine
- Party: Independent
- Other political affiliations: Servant of the People (until 2025); Democratic Alliance
- Education: Taras Shevchenko National University of Kyiv

Dmytro Serhiyovych Kostiuk (Note: In this name that follows East Slavic naming customs, the patronymic is Serhiyovych and the family name is Kostiuk.) (Ukrainian: Дмитро Сергійович Костюк; born 1 June 1993) is a Ukrainian journalist and politician currently serving as a People's Deputy of Ukraine from Ukraine's 65th electoral district. He was elected as a member of Servant of the People.

== Early life and career ==
Dmytro Serhiyovych Kostiuk was born on 1 June 1993 in Novohrad-Volynskyi, within Zhytomyr Oblast of Ukraine (now named Zviahel). He graduated from the historical faculty of Taras Shevchenko National University of Kyiv. He worked as a journalist at Espreso TV, and was a member of the "Indivisible Ukraine" non-governmental organisation. He was also chairman of the Holosiivskyi District branch of the Democratic Alliance party.

== Political career ==
Kostiuk ran in the 2019 Ukrainian parliamentary election as the candidate of Servant of the People for People's Deputy of Ukraine in Ukraine's 65th electoral district. At the time of his campaign, he was an independent. Kostiuk defeated his closest opponent, incumbent People's Deputy Volodymyr Lytvyn, by a margin of 10.09%, winning 35.73% of the vote in total.

As a People's Deputy, Kostiuk joined the Servant of the People parliamentary faction and became a member of the Verkhovna Rada Committee on Agriculture and Land Policies.

In July 2025, Kostiuk announced his exit from the Servant of the People faction over its support for Bill No. 12414, which effectively stripped the National Anti-Corruption Bureau of Ukraine and Specialized Anti-Corruption Prosecutor's Office of their independence. He was among 263 deputies who had earlier voted in favour of the bill.
