= Bloc Borys Olijnyk and Myhailo Syrota =

Bloc Borys Olijnyk and Myhailo Syrota Блок Бориса Олійника та Михайла Сироти
- Founded: 11 December 2005
- International affiliation: None

The Bloc Borys Olijnyk and Myhailo Syrota (Ukrainian: Блок Бориса Олійника та Михайла Сироти) was an electoral alliance in Ukraine created in December 2005.

In the 2006 parliamentary elections the alliance won 0.8% of the popular vote and no seats.

The alliance had the following members:

- Political Party "Informational Ukraine"
- Political Party "Party of Health"
- Labor Party of Ukraine
