= 2007 Ukrainian parliamentary election =

- 30 September 2007

All 450 seats in the Verkhovna Rada 226 seats needed for a majority
- Turnout: 62.03% (▼5.52 pp)
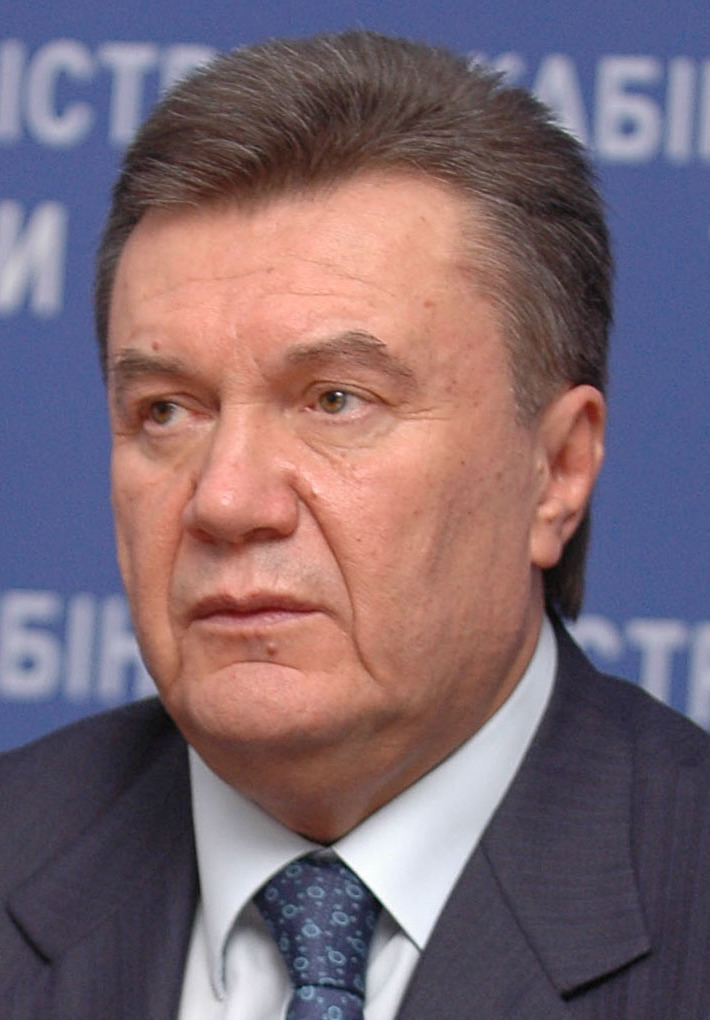

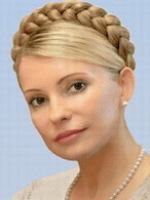

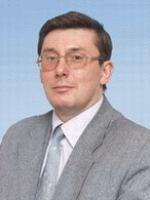

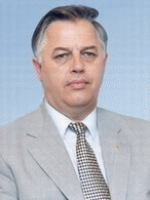

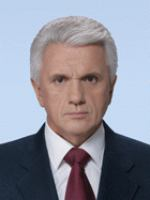
	First party	Second party	Third party
Leader	Viktor Yanukovych	Yulia Tymoshenko	Yuriy Lutsenko
Party	Party of Regions	Tymoshenko Bloc	Our Ukraine Bloc
Leader since	19 April 2003	9 February 2001	15 April 2007
Last election	186 seats, 32.78%	129 seats, 22.75%	81 seats, 14.24%
Seats won	175	156	72
Seat change	▼11	▲27	▼9
Popular vote	8,013,895	7,162,193	3,301,282
Percentage	34.94%	31.23%	14.39%
Swing	▲2.16pp	▲8.48pp	▼0.15pp
	Fourth party	Fifth party
Leader	Petro Symonenko	Volodymyr Lytvyn
Party	KPU	Lytvyn Bloc
Leader since	19 June 1993	22 October 2005
Last election	21 seats, 3.74%	0 seats, 2.49%
Seats won	27	20
Seat change	▲6	▲20
Popular vote	1,257,291	924,538
Percentage	5.48%	4.03%
Swing	▲1.78pp	▲1.54pp
- Results by electoral district
Prime Minister before election
Viktor Yanukovych
Party of Regions
Elected Prime Minister
Yulia Tymoshenko
BYuT (Batkivshchyna)

Early parliamentary elections were held in Ukraine on 30 September 2007. The election date was determined following agreement between the President Viktor Yushchenko, the Prime Minister Viktor Yanukovych and the Chairman of the Verkhovna Rada (Ukrainian Parliament) Oleksandr Moroz on 27 May 2007, in an attempt to resolve the political crisis in Ukraine triggered by the 2 April 2007 presidential decree on dissolution of Ukraine's parliament.

The 450 seats were divided among all parties that achieved a minimum 3% nationwide vote tally. The number of seats that are allocated to each party, above the 3% participation rate quota, is calculated using the Hamilton method of apportionment.

An alliance of two electoral blocs associated with the Orange Revolution, Yulia Tymoshenko Bloc (BYuT) and Our Ukraine-Peoples Self Defence (OU-PSD) obtained a narrow majority of seats, leaving their main rival, the Party of Regions (PoR) in opposition.

== Background ==
Following the 2006 parliamentary elections, there was an ongoing power struggle between the president and the parliamentary majority, which resulted in the dissolution of parliament. The majority in the parliament, known as Coalition of National Unity, was formed by Party of Regions, Communist Party, and Socialist Party. It was opposed by Yulia Tymoshenko Bloc and Our Ukraine.

Early in 2007, several members of the opposition indicated their support to the ruling coalition. If sufficient numbers of members of parliament supported the government, the Coalition of National Unity could have secured a two-thirds majority, empowering the parliament to override the president's right of veto and enabling the parliament to initiate limited constitutional changes.

On 2 April 2007, Yushchenko decreed the dissolution of the Verkhovna Rada.

The authority of the president to dismiss the parliament was challenged in the Constitutional Court, however following the president's intervention in the operation of the Constitutional Court the court has not ruled on the constitutionality of the president's decree.

The election was originally scheduled to be held on 27 May 2007 and later postponed to 24 June 2007. On 27 May 2007 an agreement was signed by President Viktor Yushchenko, Prime Minister Viktor Yanukovych, and Parliamentary Speaker Oleksandr Moroz, scheduling the elections to be held on 30 September 2007.

The President's previous decrees were revoked and a new decree based on the provisions of Article 82 and Article 90 of Ukraine's Constitution was issued in its place in August 2007 following the resignation of over 150 members of the opposition parties.

== Timetable ==
- August 2 - Commencement of Official Campaign
- August 3 - The Central Election Commission of Ukraine (CEC) is to make decision about giving an airtime for blocs and parties at the budget expense
- August 4 - The CEC must hold a draw to establish broadcast priorities; Deadline for setting of the ballot’s form and text
- August 14 - The CEC has to prepare information placards of election participants and send them to district election commissions
- August 22 - Ballots papers to be submitted for printing
- August 24 - Close of Registration by Foreign Observers
- August 25 - Close of Party List nominations; State television and radio broadcasters should submit a schedule of parties and bloc’s commercial
- August 28 - CEC verification of nominations finalized
- August 30 - Party and Block registration documentation deadline; Close of registration for civil organizations to petition for participation of official observers
- September 2 - Official publication of Election List
- September 26 - Border Services to submit list of Ukrainian Citizens who have left the country and have not returned
- September 30 - Parliamentary Elections
- October 15 - Preliminary announcement of election results
- October 20 - Official final announcement of election results

== Registered parties and blocs ==
Number in parentheses is the number of candidates included on the party list. Parties or blocs that obtained 3% or more of the vote are in bold.

- **Communist Party of Ukraine** (444)
- **Party of Regions** (450)
- Progressive Socialist Party of Ukraine (403)
- **Our Ukraine – People's Self-Defense Bloc** (401)
- All-Ukrainian Union "Freedom" (351)
- **Lytvyn's Bloc** (260)
- **Yulia Tymoshenko Bloc** (447)
- Socialist Party of Ukraine (282)
- All-Ukrainian Party of People's Trust (86)
- Party of National Economic Development of Ukraine (136)
- Bloc "All-Ukrainian Community" (103)
- Electoral bloc of Liudmyla Suprun – Ukrainian Regional Asset (387)
- Party of Free Democrats (85)
- Communist Party of Ukraine (renewed) (41)
- Peasant's Bloc "Agricultural Ukraine" (136)
- Party of Greens of Ukraine (147)
- Ukrainian People's Bloc (213)
- Electoral bloc of political parties "KUCHMA" (168)
- Bloc of Party of Pensioners of Ukraine (92)
- Christian's Bloc (225)

== Conduct ==
3354 international observers were officially registered to monitor the conduct of the election.

Representatives of the Council of Europe, the Organization for Security and Co-operation in Europe (OSCE) and Fair Election organization registered officials with the Central Elections Committee. The OSCE closely worked with Ukrainian officials in the design, administration, and conduct of the election.

Observers declared that elections generally met international standards for democratic elections. However they noted:

- delays in the formation of district and precinct election commissions
- the inadequate quality of voter lists
- possible disenfranchisement of voters due to law amendments on:
  - abolishment of absentee ballots
  - removing from lists voters who have crossed the state border after 1 August 2007.
  - modalities for voting at home
- extensive campaigning by state and local officials from all sides in violation of law.

== Exit polls ==
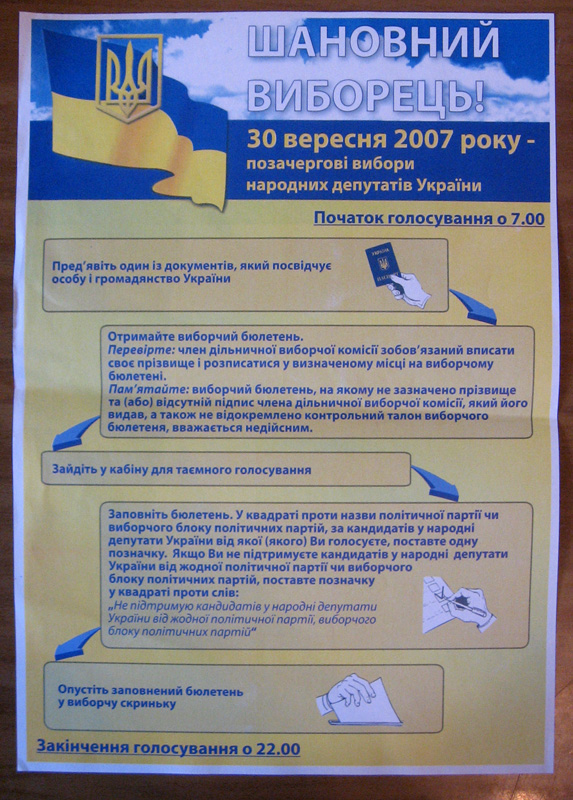
Voting process overview.

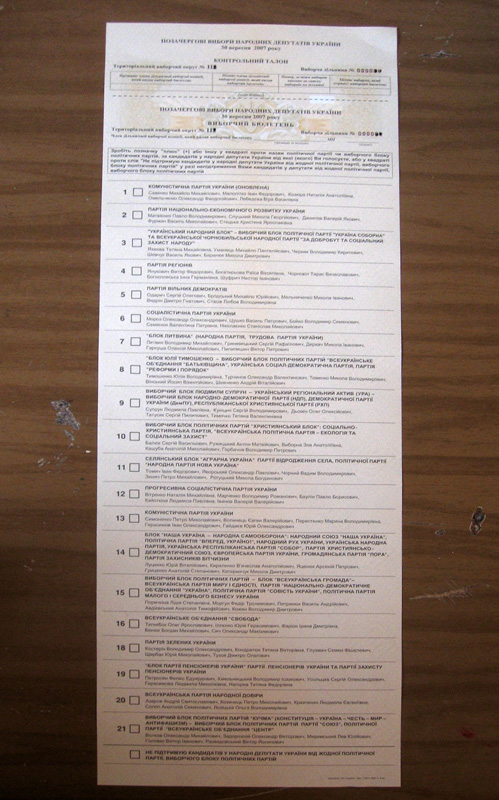
Voting ballot.

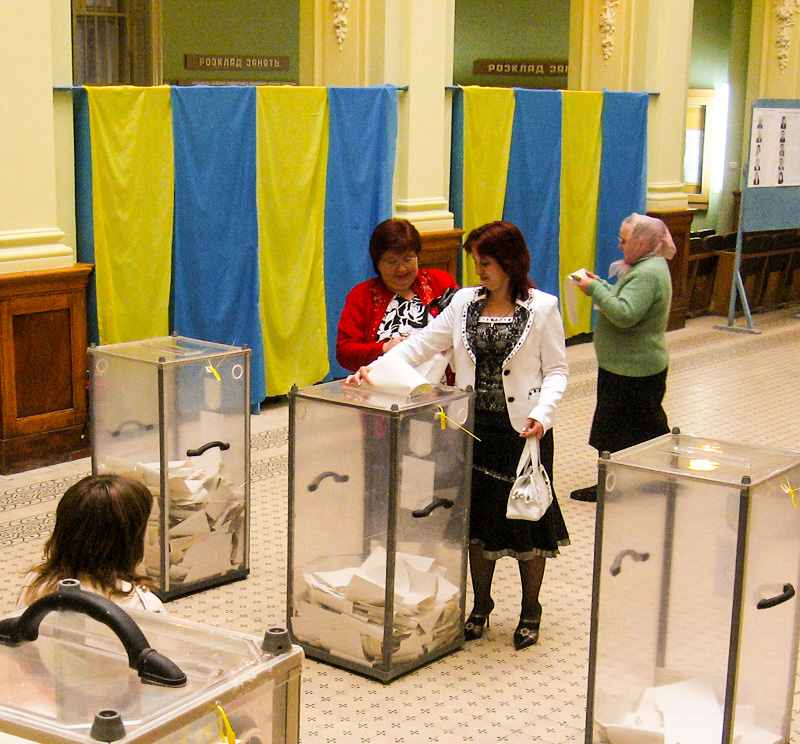
Election process.

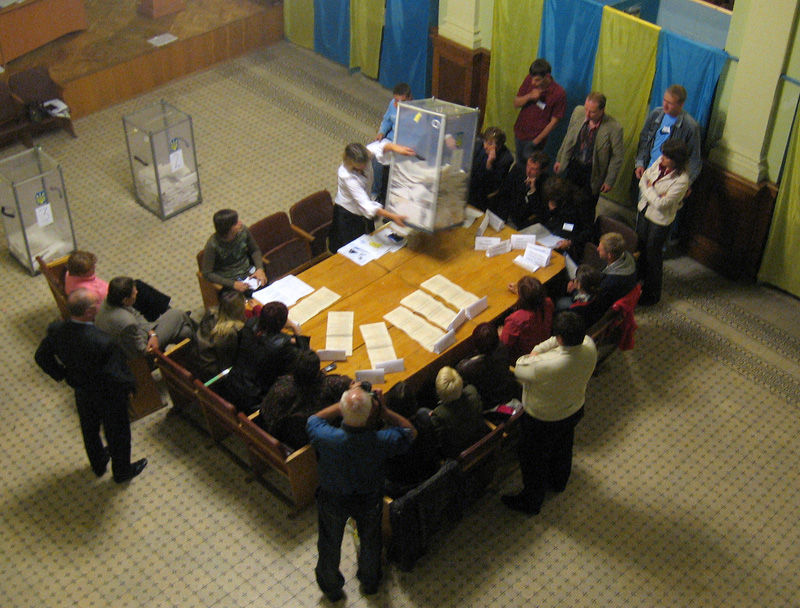
Vote counting.

Party	National Exit Poll	Sotsiovymir	Ukrainian Exit Poll	Public Strategies
Party of Regions	35.3	33.9	34.9	34.5
Yulia Tymoshenko Electoral Bloc	31.5	32.5	32.4	30.4
Our Ukraine – People's Self-Defense Bloc	13.5	14.7	14.1	14.4
Communist Party of Ukraine	5.1	4.4	4.5	5.2
Lytvyn's Bloc	3.8	4.0	3.8	4.0
Socialist Party of Ukraine	2.5	2.4	2.1	-
Progressive Socialist Party of Ukraine	1.5	-	-	-
Other parties and blocs	3.9	-	-	-
Against all	2.9	2.8	4.3	-

== Results ==
The first polling places to open were at the Ukrainian embassies in Australia and Japan. Election districts were open from 7:00AM until 10:00PM local time. According to the Central Election Commission of Ukraine 63.22% of registered voters cast ballots. This easily exceeded the 50% participation required by Ukrainian law to make the election valid.

Five parties received the required election threshold of 3% of the total vote and entered the Verkhovna Rada: Party of Regions (PoR), Yulia Tymoshenko Bloc (BYuT), Our Ukraine-Peoples Self Defence (OU-PSD), the Communist Party of Ukraine (CPU) and the Bloc Lytvyn (BL). The Socialist Party of Ukraine (SPU) secured only 2.86% of the vote and as such did not win any seats in the new parliament. Had the Socialist Party received an additional 0.14% of the vote the overall results would have been more or less the same as the previous Ukrainian parliamentary election in 2006 with the addition of Bloc Lytvyn representatives.

Party	Votes	%	Seats	+/–
Party of Regions	8,013,895	34.94	175	–11
Yulia Tymoshenko Bloc	7,162,193	31.23	156	+27
Our Ukraine — People's Self-Defense	3,301,282	14.39	72	–9
Communist Party of Ukraine	1,257,291	5.48	27	+6
Lytvyn Bloc	924,538	4.03	20	+20
Socialist Party of Ukraine	668,234	2.91	0	–33
Progressive Socialist Party of Ukraine	309,008	1.35	0	0
Svoboda	178,660	0.78	0	0
Party of Greens of Ukraine	94,505	0.41	0	0
Ukrainian Regional Asset (Hurray!)	80,944	0.35	0	0
Communist Party of Ukraine (renewed)	68,602	0.30	0	0
Party of Free Democrats	50,852	0.22	0	New
Bloc of the Party of Pensioners of Ukraine	34,845	0.15	0	0
Party of National Economic Development of Ukraine	33,489	0.15	0	0
Ukrainian People's Bloc	28,414	0.12	0	New
Peasants' Bloc "Agrarian Ukraine"	25,675	0.11	0	New
Christian Bloc	24,597	0.11	0	0
KUCHMA Bloc	23,676	0.10	0	New
All-Ukrainian Community	12,327	0.05	0	New
Party of People's Trust	5,342	0.02	0	0
Against all	637,185	2.78	–	–
**Total**	**22,935,554**	**100.00**	**450**	**0**
Valid votes	22,935,554	98.37		
Invalid/blank votes	379,658	1.63		
Total votes	**23,315,212**	**100.00**		
Registered voters/turnout	37,588,040	62.03		
Source: Central Electoral Commission

=== Support of leading parties and blocs by administrative regions ===
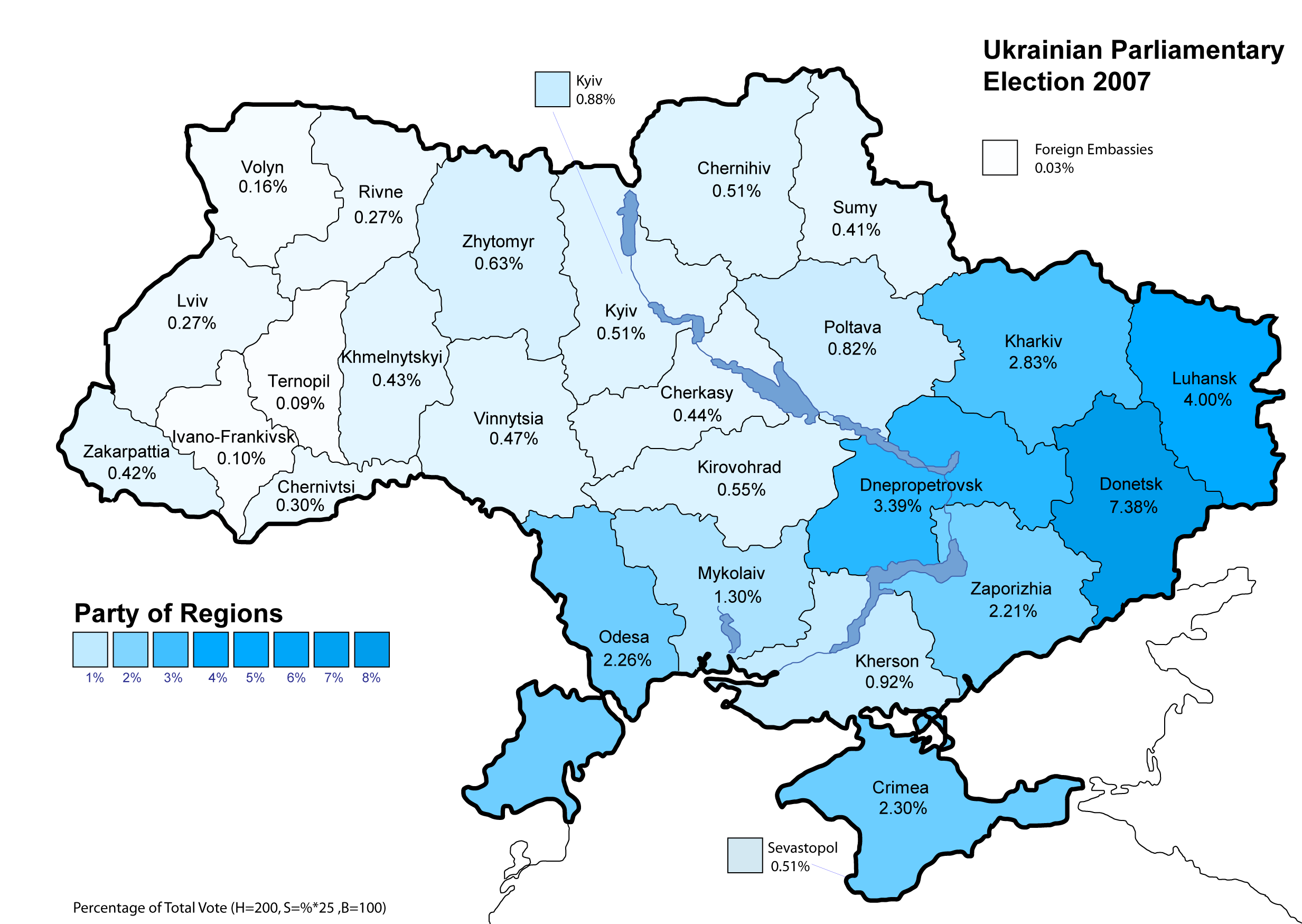
Party of Regions results (34.37%)

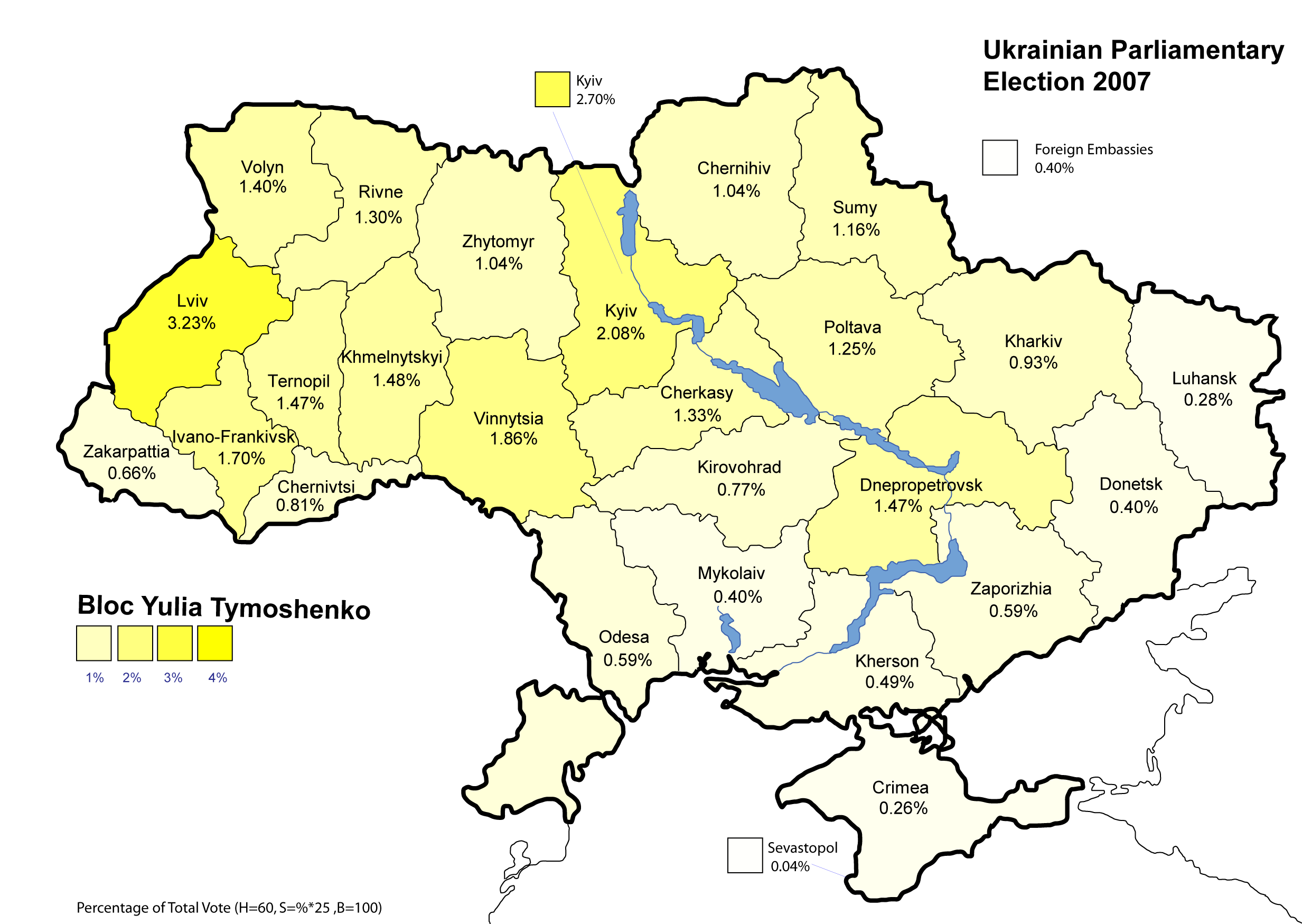
Yulia Tymoshenko Bloc results (30.71%)

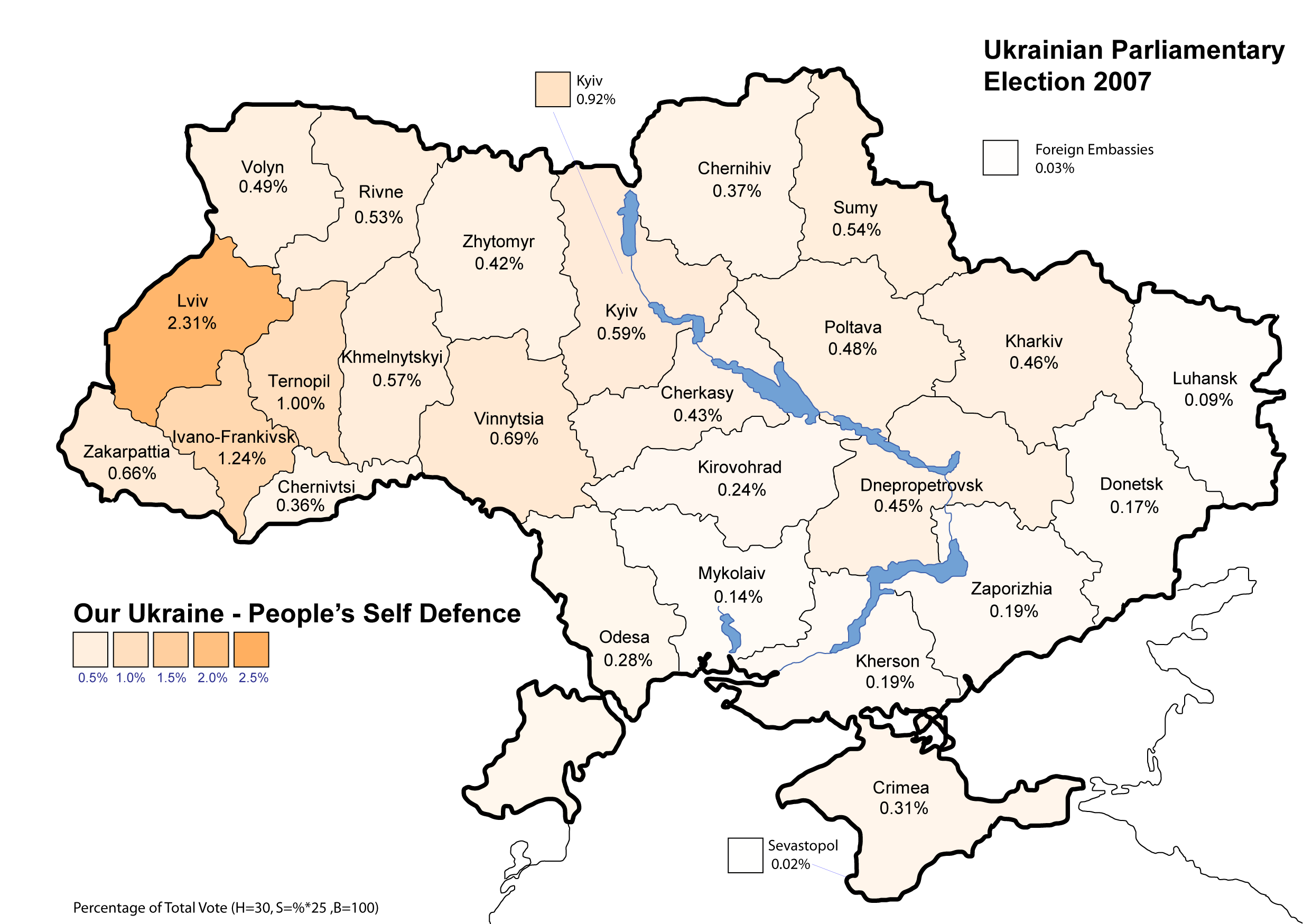
Our Ukraine People's Self-Defence results (14.15%)

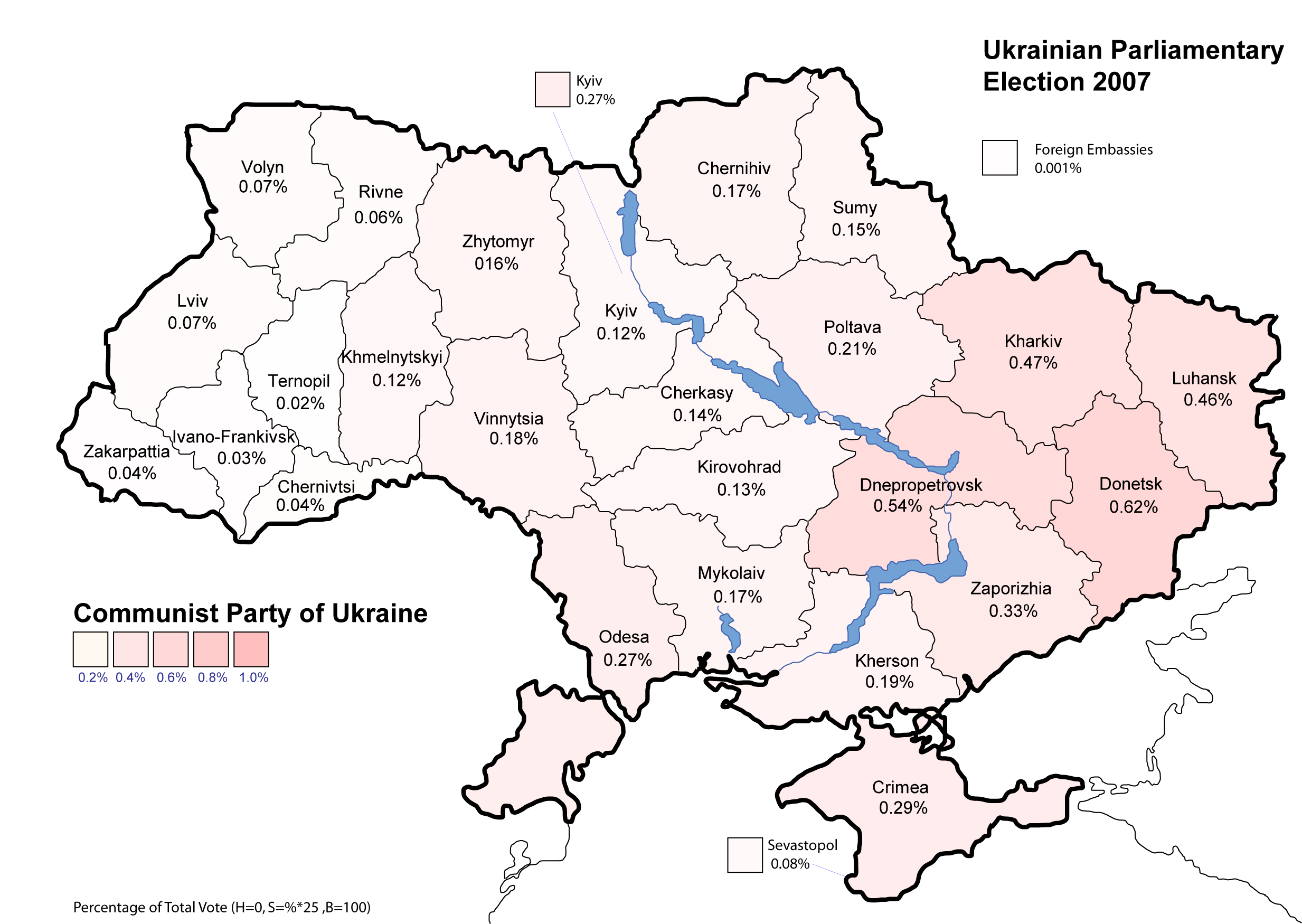
Communist Party of Ukraine results (5.39%)

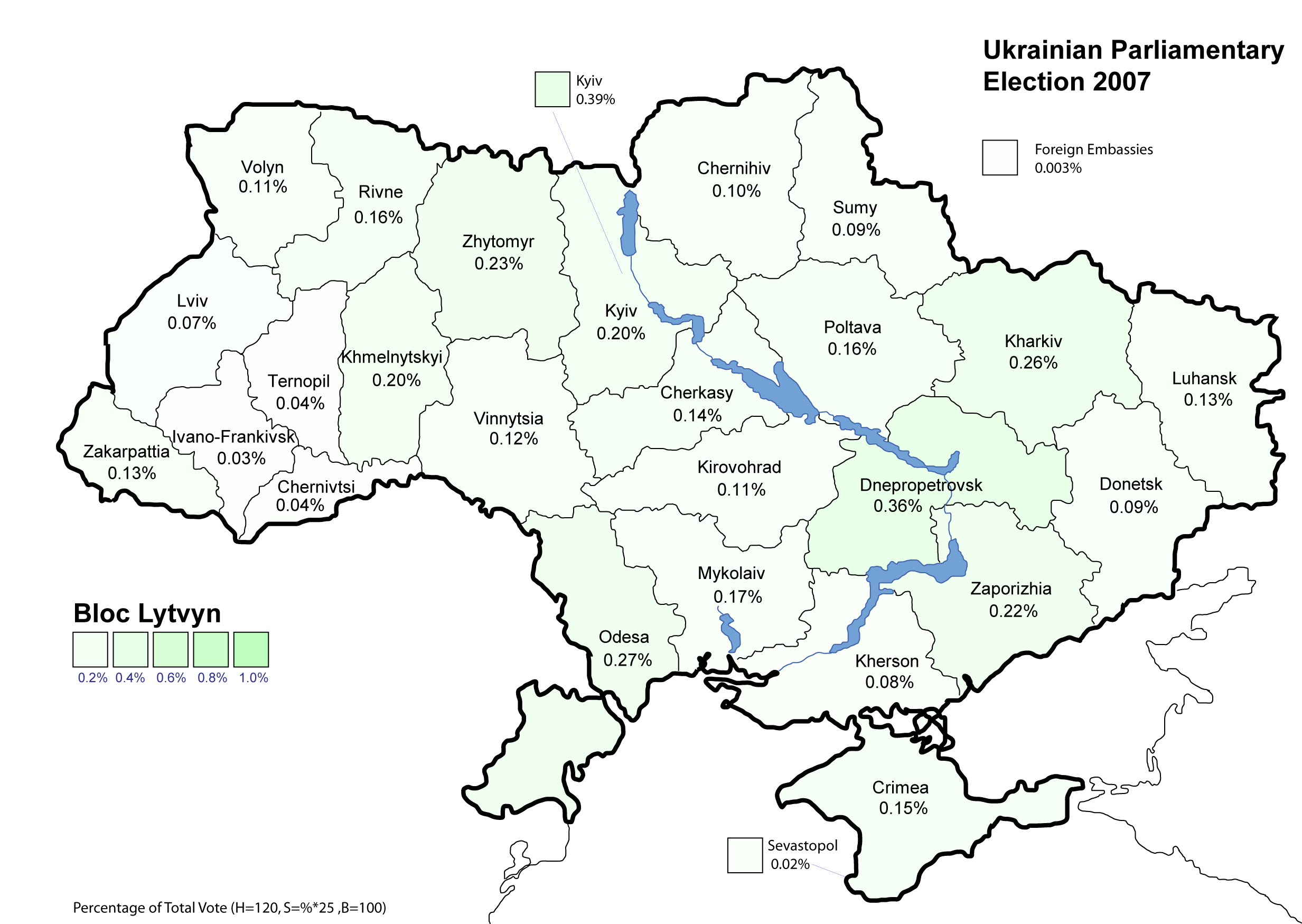
Bloc Lytvyn Party results (3.96%)

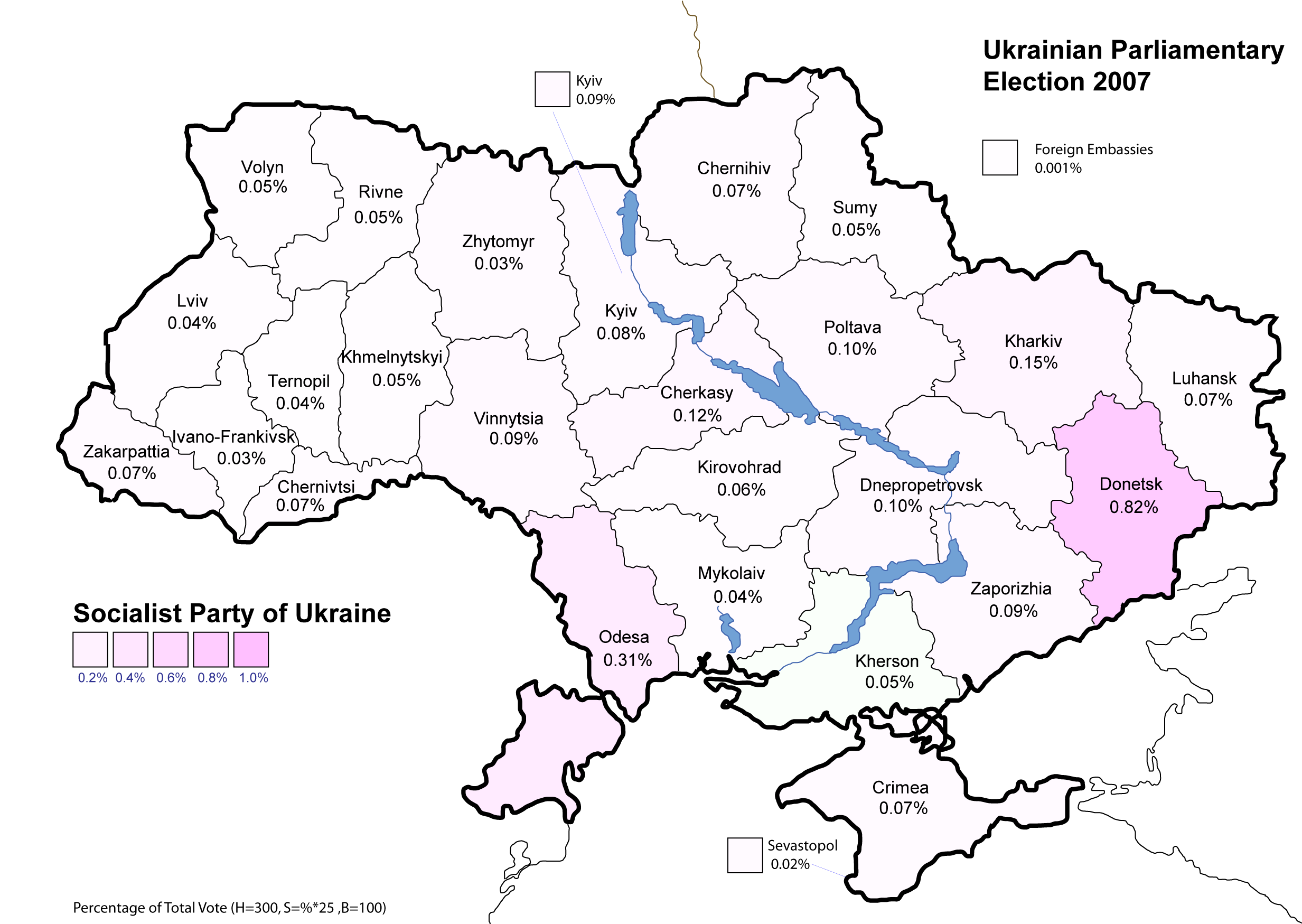
Socialist Party of Ukraine results (2.86%)

Region	Voter registration	Voter turnout	PoR	BYuT	OU-PSD	CPU	BL	SPU
Autonomous Republic of Crimea	1,568,070	55.8	61.0	6.9	8.2	7.6	3.9	1.9
Cherkasy Oblast	1,095,058	60.1	15.5	47.0	15.3	4.9	4.9	4.3
Chernihiv Oblast	939,072	61.8	20.7	41.9	14.9	6.7	4.2	2.9
Chernivtsi Oblast	705,272	58.2	16.8	46.2	20.3	2.3	2.5	3.8
Dnipropetrovsk Oblast	2,810,168	58.9	48.7	20.8	6.2	7.6	5.0	1.3
Donetsk Oblast	3,620,888	66.0	76.0	4.5	2.0	6.8	1.0	1.3
Ivano-Frankivsk Oblast	1,080,296	72.6	3.0	50.7	36.8	0.8	1.0	0.8
Kharkiv Oblast	2,282,993	58.3	49.6	16.4	8.1	8.3	4.6	2.6
Kherson Oblast	893,442	55.5	43.2	23.1	9.1	9.1	3.7	2.5
Khmelnytskyi Oblast	1,083,968	66.3	14.1	48.2	18.4	4.0	6.6	1.7
Kirovohrad Oblast	614,832	57.9	27.0	37.6	11.7	6.4	5.5	2.8
Kyiv	2,151,576	63.5	15.0	46.2	15.8	4.6	6.6	1.6
Kyiv Oblast	1,679,197	61.9	13.0	53.4	15.1	3.0	5.1	2.2
Luhansk Oblast	1,898,637	66.3	73.5	5.1	1.7	8.5	2.4	1.3
Lviv Oblast	2,002,372	73.9	4.2	50.4	36.0	1.0	1.1	0.6
Mykolaiv Oblast	971,038	57.6	54.4	16.6	5.8	7.2	4.5	1.9
Odesa Oblast	1,851,868	54.5	52.2	13.7	6.5	6.2	5.1	7.2
Poltava Oblast	1250,952	61.9	24.8	37.9	14.5	6.5	4.9	3.0
Rivne Oblast	865,092	68.7	10.4	51.0	20.8	2.4	6.1	2.1
Sevastopol	308,928	59.7	64.5	5.0	2.3	10.3	2.5	2.7
Sumy Oblast	990,575	62.0	15.7	44.5	20.8	5.8	3.3	2.0
Ternopil Oblast	870,214	76.5	3.0	51.6	35.2	0.7	1.6	1.1
Vinnytsia Oblast	1,342,608	64.5	12.6	50.0	18.6	5.0	3.1	2.5
Volyn Oblast	801,557	71.0	6.7	57.6	20.0	2.7	4.6	1.9
Zakarpattia Oblast	946,525	52.1	19.8	28.9	31.1	1.8	6.0	3.5
Zhytomyr Oblast	1,044,852	62.5	22.4	37.0	15.1	5.8	8.3	2.5
Zaporizhzhia Oblast	1,515,832	61.4	55.5	14.7	4.7	8.3	5.5	2.3
Foreign Embassies	431,142	6.0	26.5	33.1	25.5	1.6	2.3	1.2
Ukraine	37,185,882	62.0	34.4	30.7	14.2	5.4	4.0	2.9

=== Maps ===
Maps showing the top six parties support - percentage of total national vote
Party of Regions results (34.37%)	Yulia Tymoshenko Bloc results (30.71%	Our Ukraine People's Self-Defence results (14.15%)
Communist Party of Ukraine results (5.39%)	Bloc Lytvyn Party results (3.96%)	Socialist Party of Ukraine results (2.86%)

=== Comparison with previous elections ===
In 2006, minor parties that received less than the 3% statutory representation threshold, accounted for 17% of all registered votes. In 2007, this number had fallen to 5.5%. This 11.5% difference shows a voter consolidation towards major political parties.

The most prominent winners of the 2007 election were the Tymoshenko- and the Lytvyn Bloc, who gained 27 and 20 parliamentary seats respectively, while the Socialist Party lost all of its 33 seats. The Our Ukraine bloc merged with the newly formed People's Self-Defence. Despite a marginal 0.15% gain of votes, they lost 9 of their 81 previously held seats.

Voter turnout fell 5.5%, from 67.5% in 2006 to 62% in 2007.

=== Charts ===
Results of the parliamentary elections:
Political alignment 2007	Vote percentage 2006 to 2007 (Top Six parties)	Swing 2006 to 2007 (Top Six parties)

=== Charts 2006 ===
Results of the parliamentary elections:
Political alignment 2006	Vote percentage 2006(Top seven parties)

Regional results (in %) of the six parliamentary political parties or blocs in the 2006 and 2007 Ukrainian parliamentary elections
Region	PR		BYuT		OU / UO-PSD		SPU		CPU	
Region	2006	2007	2006	2007	2006	2007	2006	2007	2006	2007
Ukraine	32.1	34.4	22.3	30.7	14.0	14.2	5.7	2.9	3.7	5.4
Autonomous Republic Crimea	58.0	61.0	6.5	6.9	7.6	8.2	1.2	1.9	4.5	7.6
Vinnytsia Oblast	8.2	12.6	33.3	50.0	20.0	18.6	14.7	2.5	3.4	5.0
Volyn Oblast	4.5	6.7	43.9	57.6	20.7	20.0	4.1	1.9	2.2	2.7
Dnipropetrovsk Oblast	45.0	48.2	15.0	20.9	5.3	6.3	3.8	1.4	5.7	7.6
Donetsk Oblast	73.6	72.1	2.5	3.9	1.4	1.6	3.7	8.0	3.1	6.0
Zhytomyr Oblast	18.0	22.4	24.9	37.0	17.5	15.1	8.9	2.5	5.4	5.8
Zakarpattia Oblast	18.7	19.8	20.3	28.9	25.8	31.1	3.6	3.5	1.3	1.8
Zaporizhzhia Oblast	51.2	55.5	10.9	14.7	5.3	4.7	2.9	2.3	5.3	8.3
Ivano-Frankivsk Oblast	1.9	3.0	30.4	50.7	45.1	36.8	2.3	0.8	0.6	0.8
Kyiv Oblast	9.9	13.0	44.5	53.4	11.6	15.1	10.2	2.1	2.3	2.9
Kirovohrad Oblast	20.1	27.0	30.1	37.6	8.7	11.7	9.7	2.8	6.1	6.4
Luhansk Oblast	74.3	73.5	3.7	5.0	2.0	1.7	1.2	1.2	4.4	8.4
Lviv Oblast	3.0	4.2	33.0	50.4	38.0	36.0	2.2	0.6	0.7	1.0
Mykolaiv Oblast	50.3	54.4	11.9	16.6	5.6	5.8	4.3	1.9	5.3	7.2
Odesa Oblast	47.5	52.2	9.9	13.7	6.4	6.5	6.3	7.2	3.2	6.2
Poltava Oblast	20.4	24.8	26.8	37.9	13.2	14.5	12.7	3.8	5.4	6.5
Rivne Oblast	7.2	10.4	31.3	51.0	25.5	20.8	6.5	2.1	1.9	2.4
Sumy Oblast	10.9	15.7	33.3	44.5	19.4	20.7	10.6	2.0	5.4	5.8
Ternopil Oblast	2.0	3.0	34.5	51.6	34.2	35.2	3.7	1.1	0.4	0.7
Kharkiv Oblast	51.7	49.6	12.7	16.4	5.9	8.1	2.8	2.6	4.6	8.3
Kherson Oblast	39.1	43.2	17.4	23.0	9.8	9.0	4.8	2.5	6.8	9.1
Khmelnytskyi Oblast	10.0	14.1	35.6	48.2	18.3	18.4	9.2	1.7	3.1	4.0
Cherkasy Oblast	10.7	15.5	38.3	47.0	12.2	15.3	13.4	4.3	4.4	4.9
Chernihiv Oblast	15.6	20.7	33.9	41.9	10.3	14.9	12.9	2.9	5.5	6.7
Chernivtsi Oblast	12.7	16.8	30.3	46.2	27.0	20.3	4.5	3.8	1.7	2.3
Kyiv	11.8	15.0	39.2	46.2	15.8	15.8	5.5	1.6	3.0	4.6
Sevastopol	64.3	64.5	4.5	5.0	2.4	2.3	0.8	2.7	4.8	10.3
Source: Central Election Commission of Ukraine (Ukrainian)

Major Urban centre results (in %) of the six parliamentary political parties or blocs in the 2006 and 2007 Ukrainian parliamentary elections
Major cities	PR		BYuT		OU / UO-PSD		SPU		CPU	
Major cities	2006	2007	2006	2007	2006	2007	2006	2007	2006	2007
Ukraine	32.1	34.4	22.3	30.7	14.0	14.2	5.7	2.9	3.7	5.4
Vinnytsia	10.2	13.5	40.5	54.2	17.2	14.3	8.3	2.0	3.2	4.7
Dnipropetrovsk	41.1	43.7	16.3	22.8	6.2	6.8	3.4	1.6	4.2	7.2
Donetsk	72.6	76.0	2.7	4.5	1.8	2.0	1.0	1.3	2.9	6.8
Zhytomyr	21.2	24.5	31.2	40.0	12.9	11.5	6.1	2.1	5.1	5.8
Zaporizhzhia	44.2	50.6	14.6	19.1	6.6	5.5	2.5	1.4	5.0	8.6
Kirovohrad	18.9	26.8	39.6	42.2	7.5	8.9	5.2	2.2	5.0	5.8
Kryvyi Rih	47.3	48.8	14.2	19.9	5.8	5.8	2.9	0.9	8.3	9.2
Luhansk	70.5	67.8	5.5	7.1	2.0	2.0	0.9	1.1	3.4	8.7
L'viv	6.5	8.4	27.7	43.6	34.4	34.1	3.0	0.9	1.5	2.4
Makiivka	80.6	82.6	1.6	3.1	1.0	1.1	0.5	0.6	1.8	4.8
Mariupol	56.4	42.6	1.9	3.1	1.7	1.6	18.4	42.4	3.5	4.1
Mykolaiv	55.1	59.4	10.2	13.8	4.5	4.4	1.6	1.2	3.5	6.8
Odesa	44.2	52.7	13.0	15.5	6.9	6.3	4.8	3.4	2.5	7.2
Poltava	25.6	26.8	33.1	41.1	11.4	10.5	4.9	1.9	4.4	6.3
Rivne	10.1	12.5	32.2	48.2	19.8	20.6	8.0	1.9	2.7	3.4
Simferopol	56.0	59.0	6.5	6.9	5.2	5.8	0.9	1.1	5.2	9.2
Sumy	6.9	10.8	46.7	55.8	20.9	18.1	4.1	1.2	3.4	3.7
Kharkiv	49.5	45.7	14.7	18.9	6.9	8.1	1.7	2.4	3.8	8.6
Chernihiv	23.5	28.5	31.9	36.1	7.5	10.1	8.0	2.8	7.5	7.0
Chernivtsi	15.6	19.8	34.9	45.8	18.7	16.8	3.7	1.6	2.3	3.6
Source: Central Election Commission of Ukraine (Ukrainian)

== Government formation ==
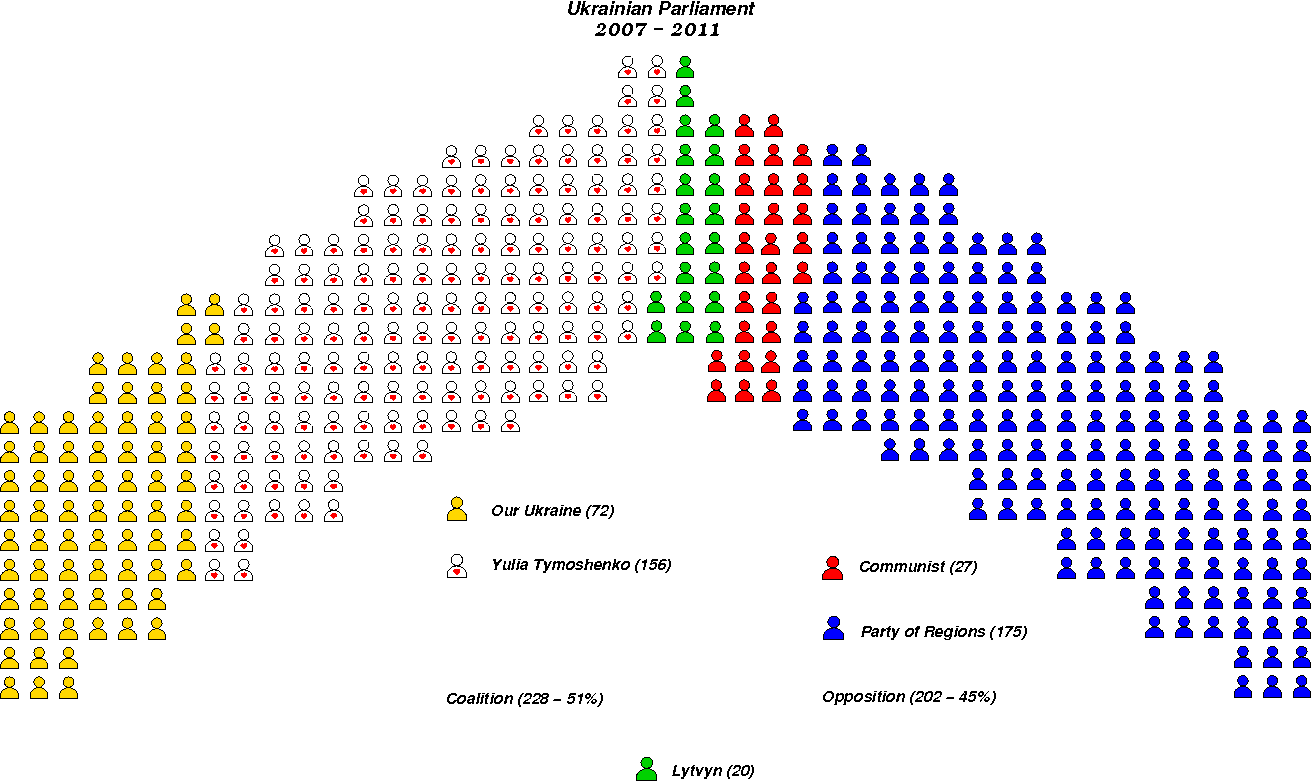
Parliament 2007

Following the announcement of preliminary election results, the parties expressed their position on forming the coalition. The Party of Regions announced itself a winner of the election and stated that it started negotiations on forming a ruling coalition. The party did not express the desire to be in opposition. Tymoshenko's Bloc advocated a coalition with Our Ukraine and possibly Lytvyn's Bloc. Yulia Tymoshenko was strongly against any coalition with the Party of Regions or the Communists. She stated that her Bloc would be in opposition should such a coalition be formed. President Yushchenko has expressed the need for a better relationship between coalition and opposition. This should be achieved by providing the opposition with posts in the parliament and the government. Lytvyn's Bloc received proposals from all top parties on forming a coalition. Leaders of the Bloc stated that their decision will be made at the party's assembly. Oleksandr Moroz, the leader of the Socialist Party of Ukraine, acknowledged his defeat on 4 October 2007 and supported Tymoshenko's bid for premiership.

Yulia Tymoshenko, following the formation of a coalition between the Yulia Tymoshenko Bloc and Our Ukraine – People's Self-Defense Bloc was subsequently elected prime-minister on 18 December 2007. Her candidacy was supported by the vote of 226 deputies.

The Verkhovna Rada of Ukraine is competent on the condition that no less than two-thirds of its constitutional composition has been elected. This means that if any one of the two largest parties resign en masse, the parliament would lose its authority and fresh elections would be required.

== Parliamentary factions after the elections ==
After the election various factions were formed in parliament. It was possible for 15 or more deputies to form a parliamentary faction (a lawmaker could join only one faction; the chairman and his two assistants could not head factions of deputies). hence not all parties represented in the Verkhovna Rada had their own faction. Factions are colored raspberry.

- Party of Regions
- Bloc of Yulia Tymoshenko – Fatherland (In November 2010 the Yulia Tymoshenko Bloc faction in the Verkhovna Rada was officially renamed Bloc of Yulia Tymoshenko – Fatherland.)
  - All-Ukrainian Union Fatherland
  - Reforms and Order Party,
- Our Ukraine – People's Self-Defense Bloc
  - People's Union "Our Ukraine"
  - Christian Democratic Union
  - People's Self-Defense Political Party (Former Forward, Ukraine!)
  - People's Movement of Ukraine,
  - Ukrainian People's Party
  - Ukrainian Platform "Sobor"
  - European Party of Ukraine
  - PORA
  - Motherland Defenders Party
- Communist Party of Ukraine
- People's Party faction (In November 2010 the Lytvyn Bloc faction in the Verkhovna Rada was renamed People's Party faction.)
  - People's Party

=== Factions created during the convocation ===
- Reforms for the Future

=== Leaders of factions/groups ===
- Oleksandr Yefremov (Party of Regions)
- Andriy Kozhemiakin (Bloc of Yulia Tymoshenko - Batkivshchyna)
- Mykola Martynenko (Our Ukraine – People's Self-Defense Bloc)
- Petro Symonenko (Communist Party of Ukraine)
- Ihor Sharov (People's Party, formerly Bloc of Volodymyr Lytvyn)
- Ihor Rybakov (Reforms for the Future)

=== Extra-parliamentary parties representation within the Verkhovna Rada ===
- Front of Changes (Members were part of the Our Ukraine – People's Self-Defense Bloc faction.)
- United Centre (Members were part of the Our Ukraine – People's Self-Defense Bloc faction.)
- Communist Party of Workers and Peasants (Chairman Leonid Hrach was expelled from the Communist Party and its faction in the Verkhovna Rada in December 2010)
- Radical Party of Ukraine was represented by Oleh Lyashko (former Fatherland)
- Ukraine – Forward! (the renamed Ukrainian Social-Democratic Party)

=== Parliamentary parties that dissolved or merged during the convocation ===
- Strong Ukraine (Strong Ukraine merged with Party of Regions on March 17, 2012; the former members of Strong Ukraine remained part of the People's Party faction)

=== Faction changes after the 2007 elections ===
Numerous MPs were removed from their original faction after the 2007 election; several left their (original) faction to join another faction in October 2010. From 2006 till October 2010 this was not allowed because of the (so-called) "imperative mandate".

In November 2010 the Yulia Tymoshenko Bloc faction was officially renamed “Bloc Yulia Tymoshenko-Batkivschyna”. and the Bloc of Lytvyn faction was renamed People's Party faction. On February 16, 2011 a new parliamentary faction "Reforms for the Future" was created. The parliament elected in the following election on 28 October 2012 was appointed and started its tasks six weeks after the elections on 12 December 2012. The parliament elected in 2007 convened on 6 December 2012 for the last time.

Fraction changes after the Ukrainian parliamentary election, 2007
**Parties and alliances**	Seats on September 30, 2007	Seats on December 31, 2010	Seats on December 31, 2011	Seats in March 2012	Seats in September 2012	Seats in November 2012	Total loss/gain
Party of Regions	175	180	192	192	195	195	20 seats
Yulia Tymoshenko Bloc	156	113	102	100	98	97	59 seats
Our Ukraine – People's Self-Defense Bloc	72	71	65	65	63	63	9 seats
Communist Party of Ukraine	27	25	25	25	25	25	2 seats
Lytvyn Bloc	20	20	20	20	20	20	
Reforms for the Future	Did not exist	Did not exist	20	19	19	19	19 seats
Parliamentarians not members of faction	0	41	26	29	30	31	31 seats

== See also ==
- List of members of the parliament of Ukraine, 2007–2012
