= Ukrainian People's Bloc =

Ukrainian political bloc

The Ukrainian People's Bloc (Ukrainian: Український Народний Блок) was an electoral bloc in Ukraine. In the 30 September 2007 elections, the bloc failed to win parliamentary representation, winning 0.12% of the votes.

Member parties:

- Political Party "Cathedral Ukraine"
- All-Ukrainian Chornobyl People's Party "For the Welfare and Protection of the People"
