= Andriy Kolodyuk =

Ukrainian businessman

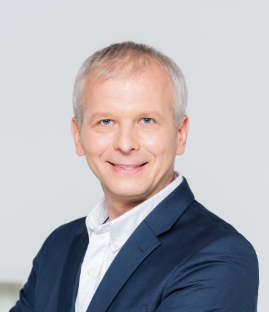
- Andriy Kolodyuk
- Born: May 25, 1971 (age 55)
- Occupations: Venture capitalist, entrepreneur, investor

Andriy Kolodyuk is a Ukrainian entrepreneur and investor. He is the founder and managing partner of Aventures Capital, chairman of the board of the Ukrainian Venture Capital and Private Equity Association (UVCA).

In August 2014, Andriy initiated the founding of UVCA. He became its chairman of the supervisory board in November 2024.

According to the ratings of Korrespondent and Focus magazines, he was part of the lists of the richest people of Ukraine (2007–2008). He was chosen by Young Global Leader in the World Economic Forum in 2008.

He is the co-author of the book Information Society. Ukrainian path.

== Education ==
In 1996, Andriy Kolodyuk graduated from Kyiv Polytechnic Institute. Since 2000, he has studied at Taras Shevchenko National University of Kyiv.

In 2005, he defended his PhD thesis: "Information Society: Modern Condition and Perspectives of Development in Ukraine" with the specialty "Political Culture and Ideology”.

== Entrepreneurship ==
Andriy Kolodyuk moved to New York in 1992 and began entrepreneurial activity in the fields of IT, telecommunications and media.

In 1994, Andriy Kolodyuk, together with other partners, founded Ukrinvestcom. A year later he returned to Ukraine. UNITRADE was founded by the financial support of Ukrinvestcom, in which Kolodyuk held the post of President of the company during 1994–1998.

In 2001, a venture company AVentures appeared on the market as part of the reorganization of Ukrinvestcom. Under the auspices of AVentures, in the fall of 2003, there were organized road-shows in three major US cities, which presented opportunities of 20 Ukrainian software companies.

In 2003, Kolodyuk opened a representative office of the Ukrainian Software Consortium in Silicon Valley. The office included about 30 Ukrainian companies.

In 2009, Andriy left the company and founded Divan.TV to provide streaming services. In 2016, Divan.tv became available on Smart.TV Philips, Samsung, LG and others in 200 countries.

== Investor ==
Kolodyuk's first venture project was the Unitrade company in 1994. He invested $5,000 in it.

In 2001, Kolodyuk created a venture company AVentures.

In 2012, a new AVentures Capital Venture Fund was launched for investing in IT startups having R&D in Ukraine and Central Eastern Europe. The fund focuses on investments in industries such as software, e-commerce, cloud services, mobile technologies, IOT and others.

In 2016, Kolodyuk's UVCA initiated a launch of the government fund for startups, expected to boost the growth of the national venture capital and IT sectors, enabling 2,500 existing startups to secure financing. According to the association, only 66 of these startups managed to attract investments in 2015.

In 2019, Ciclum raised a new investment round with the participation of AVentures Capital.

As of 2021, there were 24 companies in AVentures Capital portfolio.

In November 2015, Kolodyuk joined the supervisory board of the International Ciklum Software Development Company after promoting the Ukrainian Redevelopment Fund.

In 2022, data protection startup with Ukrainian roots Spin Technology which was backed by AVentures raised $16M in a Series A round with a $55 million valuation.

In 2022, Kolodyuk revealed the number of venture investments in Ukraine: over eight years, a total of $2.8 billion has been invested in the Ukrainian ecosystem, with foreign investments amounting to $780 million in 2021.

In January 2022, Qualcomm acquired Ukrainian company Augmented Pixels, which counted AVentures Capital among its investors.

In August 2022, Spin Technology raised $16 million in Series A funding, valuing the company at $55 million. Initial funding included a $500,000 seed round from AVentures Capital in 2017.

== Social activities and views ==
In 2001 he became a co-founder and a President and an international expert of the All-Ukrainian Foundation "Information Society of Ukraine".

Since July 2003, he has headed the working group "Electronic Ukraine", which worked on the creation of the project "National Strategy for Development of the Information Society of Ukraine".

He is the author of research analyzes in the field of information society. He is the co-authors of Promoting Enavironment for Information Society Development in Cis Countries.

In 2014, Kolodyuk became a member of the Brain Basket Foundation Supervisory Board, whose purpose is to improve the level of education in Ukraine.

In August 2014, he initiated the founding of UVCA (Ukrainian Association of Venture Capital and Direct Investments), and in November 2014 he was elected a chairman of the supervisory board of the Association. The purpose of the Association is to promote Ukraine's investment capabilities.

In 2015, in Kyivpost interview Kolodyuk said that "building a startup nation is a new Ukrainian dream".

In 2015, Andriy Kolodyuk also shared his insights on the WeForum blog, inspired by Israel's reputation as a "start-up nation" as described by Dan Senor and Saul Singer. He reflected on Ukraine's potential to follow in Israel's footsteps, highlighting the country's burgeoning start-up ecosystem with over 2,000 start-ups, significant global R&D presence, and strong tech industry despite its geopolitical challenges. Kolodyuk emphasized Ukraine's tradition of innovation, cost-effective operation, and global market focus, comparing the vast opportunities and professional capabilities in Ukraine to those in the US, but at a fraction of the cost.

In 2016, Kolodyuk, in a commentary to the Financial Times, said that the early adoption of blockchain technologies gave Ukraine an edge in comparison to other too-regulated countries.

In 2018, during the World Economic Forum, Kolodyuk initiated the founding of the Ukrainian House in Davos and joined his organizational committee.

In 2018, Kolodyuk told to Financial Times that "early adoption of blockchain technology has given Ukraine an edge compared to other regulation-heavy countries".

UVCA in partnership with Western NIS Enterprise Fund and the Viktor Pinchuk Foundation contributed to the development of the project.

=== Since 2022 ===
In 2022, after the Russian invasion of Ukraine, Andriy Kolodyuk co-founded with Jan Thys the Free Ukraine Foundation, a non-profit in Belgium to assist Ukrainian people and businesses affected by the war.

In the aftermath of the Russian invasion, Andriy Kolodyuk initiated the 'Support Ukrainian startups NOW' program through the FREE Ukraine Foundation and UVCA, aiming to aid IT entrepreneurs in Ukraine and their families affected by the war. Within the initiative 24 startups remaining in Ukraine got an average funding of $5,000 each, alongside creating a catalog of Ukrainian startups with high investment potential to connect them with global investors.

In 2022, during the Davos World Economic Forum, the Ukrainian Venture Capital and Private Equity Association (UVCA) organized a Round Table titled "The Ukraine Redevelopment and Recovery plan." This event brought together leading international institutional and venture investors including Brian Kaufmann from Viking Global Investors, Jürgen Rigterink of the EBRD, and representatives from Oaktree Capital Management and Hedera Hashgraph, along with over 10 other investors, discussed the resilience and investment needs of the Ukrainian IT sector amidst the war. The UVCA introduced tools for investment realization and plans to draw foreign investment into critical sectors like energy, water purification, and healthcare. Kolodyuk highlighted the urgency of implementing practical projects for joint investments, estimated at a $1 trillion opportunity, to provide critical infrastructure and support for cities affected by the war, underlining the launch of an investment platform to facilitate these endeavors.

Kolodyuk has emphasized the importance of the private and venture capital industry in executing the Ukrainian Redevelopment and Recovery plan, known as the Marshall Plan for Ukraine. He advocates for the plan to be supported by portfolio companies and SMEs in addition to macroeconomic aid for Ukraine, highlighting the critical role of private investment in the country's recovery and development.

On February 2, 2026, Kolodyuk and his partner Jerome Leclanche co-hosted the AI in Defence Summit, which featured a keynote from Andrius Kubilius.

== Political activity ==
In November 2004, Kolodyuk was a participant in the Orange Revolution and participated in the Hi-Tech march in support of democracy and truth.

From 2005 to 2010, he headed the Information Ukraine Party. He supported the position that Ukraine has no effective and coordinated legislative framework for the development of an ICT industry.

During the Revolution of Dignity, Kolodyuk was one of the organizers of the IT tent on the Independence Square in Kyiv.

== Public speaking ==
Andriy Kolodyuk has spoken on AI and defence technology and has taken part in conferences in Davos, Brussels and London. He co-founded the AI in Defence Summit in Brussels and has written on AI in defence as a strategic priority for Europe. In Davos, he has spoken on conflict prevention, investment, dual-use technology and hybrid conflict, including at Davos Week in 2024, the Cyber Future Dialogue in 2025 and 2026, and a session on dual-use and space technology at unDavos in 2025. In Brussels, his appearances include a panel on financial markets for Ukraine's prosperity at Ukraine's Future Summit (2024), a European Commission session on private investment for Ukraine's recovery (2024) and the AI in Defence Summit (2026), where he moderated the panel "The AI Investments Landscape." In London, he took part in a session showcasing Ukrainian defence technology companies at the UK–Ukraine Defence Tech Forum in November 2024.

== See also ==
- Information Ukraine
