= People's Party (Ukraine) =

People's Party Народна партія
- Leader: Volodymyr Lytvyn
- Founded: 1996
- Ideology: Agrarianism
- Political position: Centre
- Colours: Blue
- Verkhovna Rada: 0 / 450
- Regions: 12 / 43,122

Website
- narodna.org.ua

The People's Party (Ukrainian: Народна партія, romanized: Narodna partiia) is a political party in Ukraine. It was previously known as the Agrarian Party of Ukraine (Ukrainian: Аграрна партія України). The party is led by Volodymyr Lytvyn. In September 2011, he claimed that his party was only surpassed in membership by the Party of Regions and Bloc Yulia Tymoshenko.

The party won 2 seats in the Ukrainian parliament in the 2012 Ukrainian parliamentary election. The party did not take part in national elections since 2012.

== History ==
During the 1998 Ukrainian parliamentary election the party gained 3.68% of the popular vote, the party won 2 (single-mandate constituency) seats.

At the parliamentary elections on 30 March 2002, the party was part of the For United Ukraine alliance. At the parliamentary elections on 26 March 2006 the party was part of the electoral Lytvyn's People's Bloc, which won 2.44% of the popular vote and no seats. In the parliamentary elections on 30 September 2007, the party was part of the Lytvyn Bloc alliance, that won 20 out of 450 seats.

In November 2010 the Bloc of Lytvyn faction in the Verkhovna Rada (Ukraine's parliament) was renamed People's Party faction.

In the 2010 local elections the party won representative in 20 of the 24 regional parliaments, it did not win seats in the Supreme Council of Crimea.

In August 2011 party leader Lytvyn stated that his People's Party will merge with fellow Ukrainian party Party of Regions. Earlier that month Strong Ukraine had announced the same move. But Mid-December 2011 Lytvyn stated that People's Party will participate in the 2012 parliamentary elections independently. In these election the party did not run on the nationwide proportional party-list but it did win 2 constituencies (it had competed in 58 constituencies), one won by Lytvyn and the other one by Serhiy Hrynyvetsky, and thus parliamentary representation. Hrynyvetsky joined the faction of Party of Regions in December 2012, while Lytvyn did not join any faction.

In the 2014 parliamentary election the party did not compete on the nationwide party list and also did not win a constituency seat and thus no parliamentary seats. Lytvyn was re-elected into parliament as an independent candidate in electoral district 65.

Again the party did not take part in the 2019 Ukrainian parliamentary election. In this election Volodymyr Lytvyn lost his parliamentary seat after losing his constituency.

In the 2020 Ukrainian local elections the party gained 12 deputies (0.03% of all available mandates).

== Election results ==
Verkhovna Rada
Year	Popular vote	% of popular vote	Overall seats won	Seat change	Government
1998	978,330	3.8%	2 / 450	▲2	support
2002	For United Ukraine bloc		22 / 450	▲20	coalition government
2006	Lytvyn Bloc		0 / 450	▼22	N/A
2007	Lytvyn Bloc		20 / 450	▲20	opposition
2012			2 / 450	▼18	support

=== Local councils ===
Election	Performance				Rank
Election	%	± pp	Seats	+/–	Rank
2015	0.34%	New	531 / 158,399	New	11th
2020	0.03%	▼0.31	12 / 43,122	▼519	70th
