= All-Ukrainian Party of People's Trust =

Ukrainian political party registered in 2000

The All-Ukrainian Party of People's Trust (Ukrainian: Всеукраїнська партія Народної Довіри) is a political party in Ukraine registered in August 2000 as the Party of protection of disadvantaged people of Ukraine (Ukrainian: Партія захисту знедоленого народу України).

The party participated independently in the 2006 and 2007 Ukrainian parliamentary elections. In the 2006 parliamentary elections, the party failed to win parliamentary representation. In the 2007 parliamentary elections, the party failed to win parliamentary representation again, winning 0.11% and 0.02% of the vote respectively. The party did not participate in the 2012 or 2014 Ukrainian parliamentary election.
