= Volodymyr Lytvyn =

Ukrainian politician (born 1956)

Hero of Ukraine Volodymyr Lytvyn OS
- Володимир Литвин
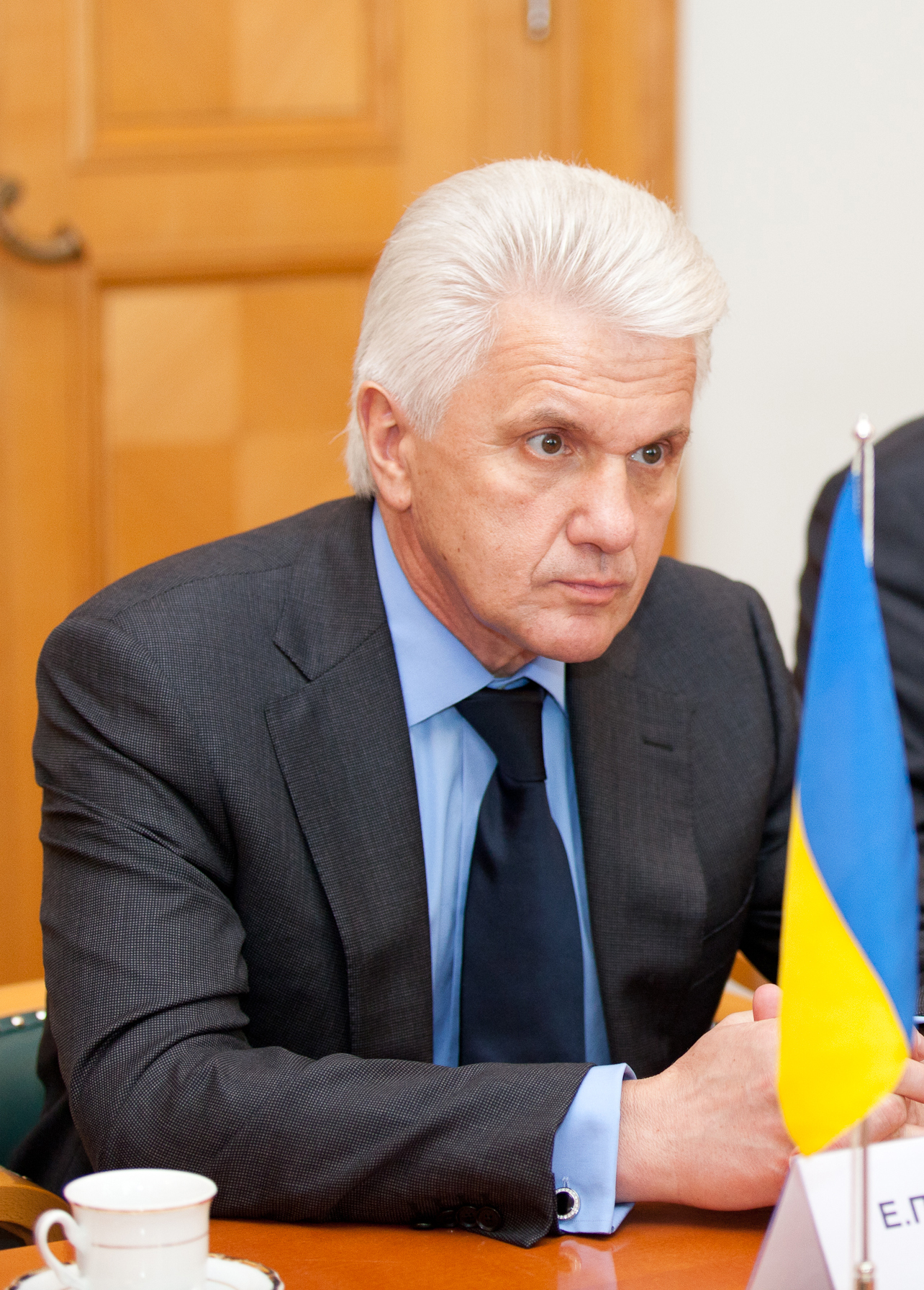
- Lytvyn in 2012

Chairman of the Verkhovna Rada
- In office 9 December 2008 – 12 December 2012
- President: Viktor Yushchenko; Viktor Yanukovych
- Preceded by: Oleksandr Lavrynovych (acting)
- Succeeded by: Volodymyr Rybak
- In office 28 May 2002 – 6 July 2006
- President: Leonid Kuchma; Viktor Yushchenko
- Preceded by: Ivan Plyushch
- Succeeded by: Oleksandr Moroz

Head of Presidential Administration
- In office November 1999 – May 2002
- President: Leonid Kuchma
- Preceded by: Mykola Biloblotsky
- Succeeded by: Viktor Medvedchuk

Leader of People's Party
- Incumbent
- Assumed office June 2004

People's Deputy of Ukraine

4th convocation
- In office 14 May 2002 – 25 May 2006
- Constituency: Independent, No.1

6th convocation
- In office 23 November 2007 – 6 December 2012
- Constituency: People's Party, No.1

7th convocation
- In office 12 December 2012 – 27 November 2014
- Constituency: People's Party, Zhytomyr Oblast, District No.65

8th convocation
- In office 27 November 2014 – 2019
- Constituency: People's Party, Zhytomyr Oblast, District No.65

Personal details
- Born: 28 April 1956 (age 70) Sloboda-Romanivska, Zhytomyr Oblast, Ukrainian SSR, Soviet Union
- Party: People's Party (2004–present)
- Other political affiliations: For United Ukraine Bloc (2002–2004)
- Spouse: Tetyana Kostyantynivna
- Children: 2
- Education: Kyiv University
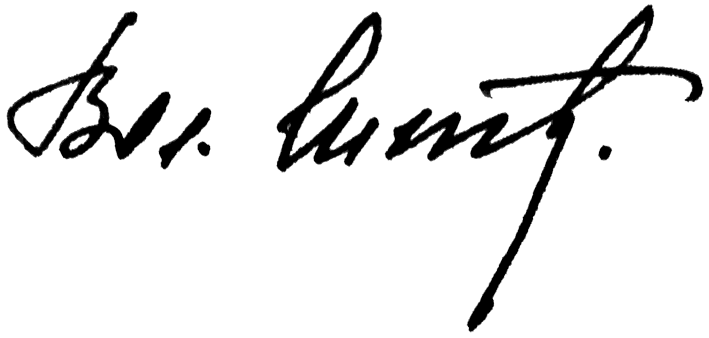
- Signature
- Website: www.lytvyn-v.org.ua

Volodymyr Mykhailovych Lytvyn (Ukrainian: Володимир Михайлович Литвин, IPA: [woloˈdɪmɪr mɪˈxɑjlowɪtʃ lɪtˈwɪn]; born 28 April 1956) is a Ukrainian politician best known for being Chairman of the Verkhovna Rada. Having previously served in that position from 2002 until 2006, he was re-elected in December 2008 after his party agreed to join the former coalition of Yulia Tymoshenko in an expanded capacity and stayed Chairman until December 2012. From 1994 to 1999, Lytvyn was an aide to President Leonid Kuchma and, later, the head of his Presidential Office.

== Early biography and private life ==
Lytvyn was born in Sloboda-Romanivska village in the Novohrad-Volynskyi Raion of the Zhytomyr Oblast. Lytvyn graduated from the Kyiv University (Faculty of History) in 1978. In 1984, he defended his dissertation "Efforts of the Communist Party of Ukraine in improving the preparation of teachers in social disciplines".

Lytvyn started his career at the Kyiv State University (1978−86), then he worked as Head of Directorate in the Ministry of Higher and Secondary Vocational Training of the Ukrainian SSR (1986−89). He worked as a political analyst at the Central Committee of the Communist Party of Ukraine, the Ukrainian branch of CPSU, in 1989−1991.

Lytvyn is a correspondent member of the National Academy of Sciences of Ukraine, Honored Worker of Sciences and Technology of Ukraine. However, in 2002 he was publicly and reasonably accused of plagiarizing a Western scholar when writing his article to Dzerkalo Tyzhnia newspaper.

He is married to Tetyana Kostyantynivna (born 1960), an economist. Their daughter Olena (born 1982) is a beauty industry entrepreneur, and their son Ivan (born 1989) is a student.

Lytvyn's hobbies include reading, football, and taking care of dalmatian dogs.

== Political career ==
=== Head of the Presidential Administration ===
In 1994, Lytvyn became the aide to the newly elected President Leonid Kuchma. In 1999, he was appointed as the head of the Presidential Administration.

==== Gongadze murder ====
During the Cassette Scandal audiotapes were released on which Kuchma, Lytvyn and other top-level administration officials are allegedly heard discussing the need to silence Georgiy Gongadze for his online news reports about high-level corruption. Gongadze's decapitated body was found in the suburbs of Kyiv in November 2000. In 2000, Mykola Melnychenko released a secretly-taped recording allegedly of a conversation between Kuchma and Lytvyn in which the two discussed getting rid of Gongadze. Lytvyn is alleged to have said that Kuchma should "let loose [Interior Minister] Kravchenko to use alternative methods" on Gongadze. Lytvyn denied the allegation, saying that the tape was a fabrication. Independent experts who have analysed the tapes are divided as to their authenticity. Gongadze was found beheaded in a shallow grave in 2000. In 2005, Kravchenko was found dead with two bullets in his head. Official investigations concluded that he had committed suicide and that he had ordered Gongadze's murder. Lytvyn stated "The investigation confirmed my innocence in this case, despite the fact that efforts have been, are being and will be taken to make me practically the main person accused [of killing the journalist]".

During the 2011—2013 trial of Oleksiy Pukach, Pukach claimed that (former) Ukrainian President Leonid Kuchma and Lytvyn (at the time of the murder Kuchma's head of his Presidential Administration) had ordered the murder of Gongadze.

=== Parliamentary career ===
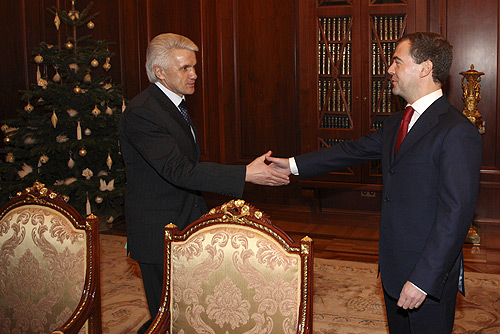
Lytvyn meeting with Russian President Dmitry Medvedev in December 2008.

In 2002, Lytvyn was elected to Verkhovna Rada as the head of the party bloc For United Ukraine ("Za edynu Ukrainu"). He became the Chairman of the Verkhovna Rada (speaker) of the legislature as a compromising figure among the parliamentary factions.

Lytvyn refused to take part in the presidential election of 2004 despite his significant political influence.

Lytvyn's brother, Mykola Lytvyn was the chief of Ukraine's Border Guard.

Lytvyn is known for his ironic political expressions. One of his best-known sentences is "I do not protest at forming an artificial majority in our parliament. But I want this majority to include every member of parliament."

At the parliamentary elections on 26 March 2006, his Lytvyn's People's Bloc won 2.44% of the popular vote and no seats since it did not meet the 3 percent threshold. Lytvyn's allies (together with other parties) declared the voting results forged, filing a court suit and starting a public campaign. However, Lytvyn himself avoids press and shows deep disappointment since the results announced. Elected vice-chairman NAN.

In the early parliamentary election held on 30 September 2007, the Lytvyn Bloc (renamed from Lytvyn's People's Bloc) consisted of the People's Party and the Labour Party. The bloc placed fifth with 20 out of 450 seats.

=== 2010 presidential election, and 2012–14 parliamentary elections ===
On 6 December 2009, Mykola Melnychenko, former bodyguard to Kuchma, accused Lytvyn of ordering the murder of journalist Georgiy Gongadze in 2000. A spokesperson for Lytvyn dismissed the claims as part of the 2010 Ukrainian presidential election campaign. During the election Lytvyn received 2,35% of the votes.

Lytvyn took part in the 2012 Ukrainian parliamentary election as a People's Party candidate in single-member districts number 65 (first-past-the-post wins a parliament seat) located in Narodychi Raion. He won a parliamentary seat by winning this constituency. Lytvyn did not join any parliamentary faction after taking his seat.

In the 2014 parliamentary election Lytvyn was re-elected into parliament as an independent candidate in electoral district 65 located in Zviahel with 41.48% of the votes. In parliament, he joined the parliamentary group People's Will until he was asked to leave it on 19 October 2017.

=== 2019 parliamentary elections and end of political career ===
In the 2019 Ukrainian parliamentary election Lytvyn lost his parliamentary seat after losing his constituency. He gained 25.65% of the votes, while the winner Dmytro Kostiuk of the Servant of the People party scored 35.73%.

In March 2021 Lytvyn lost in the election for the rector of the Taras Shevchenko National University of Kyiv, taking fourth place with a result of about 4% of the vote. The next day he resigned as chairman of the supervisory board of this university.

== Family ==
- Father, Mykhailo Klymovych (1930)
- Mother, Olha Andriivna (1929)
- Brothers
  - Mykola Lytvyn (1961), General of the Army, Border Troops commander
  - Petro Lytvyn, a commander of the Southern Operational Command of Ukrainian Ground Forces

== Awards ==
Volodymyr Lytvyn was bestowed upon the following awards:

- Hero of Ukraine (2004)
- State Prize in Science and Technology (1999)
- Distinguished Scientists of Ukraine (1998)

== See also ==
- Ukraine without Kuchma
- Orange Revolution

Government offices
| Preceded by Mykola Biloblotsky | Head of the Presidential Administration; 1999-2002 | Succeeded by Viktor Medvedchuk |
Political offices
| Preceded by Ivan Plyushch | Chairman of the Verkhovna Rada; 2002–2006 | Succeeded by Oleksandr Moroz |
| Preceded by Oleksandr Lavrynovych; Acting | Chairman of the Verkhovna Rada; 2008–2012 | Succeeded by Volodymyr Rybak |
