= Lytvyn Bloc =

Lytvyn Bloc Блок Литвина
- Leader: Volodymyr Lytvyn
- First Deputy: Serhiy Hrynevetsky
- Parliamentary leader: Ihor Fedorovych Sharov
- Founded: 2006
- Dissolved: 15 December 2012
- Ideology: Centrism; Agrarianism
- Political position: Centre
- International affiliation: None
- Colours: Green

The Lytvyn Bloc, formerly Lytvyn's People's Bloc, (Ukrainian: Блок Литвина, formerly Народний блок Литвина) was a centrist political alliance in Ukraine from 2006 till 2012 led by Volodymyr Lytvyn. It is one of successors of the previous political alliance For United Ukraine which fell apart after Party of Regions left it. In 2007, the bloc surprisingly managed to return to parliament as a union of the People's Party and the Labour Party. According to Lytvyn the party had 400,000 members in October 2009.

On 17 November 2011 the Ukrainian Parliament approved an election law that banned the participation of blocs of political parties in parliamentary elections.

== History ==
=== Ukrainian parliamentary election, 2006 ===
During the 2006 parliamentary elections, the bloc was known as Lytvyn's People's Bloc and consisted of:

- People's Party (Narodna Partiya)
- Party of All-Ukrainian Union of the Left "Justice" (Partiya Vseukrayinskoho Obyednannya Livikh "Spravedlivist")
- Ukrainian Peasant Democratic Party (Ukrayinska Selyanska Demokratychna Partiya)

The bloc had been organized for participation in the 2006 parliamentary election. The electoral bloc's list was headed by:

#	Name	Prior Position
1	Volodymyr Lytvyn	Speaker of the Verkhovna Rada
2	Sofia Rotaru	Singer
3	Leonid Kadenyuk	Astronaut
4	Valeriy Smoliy	Head of the Institute of History of Ukraine
5	Vasyl Maliarenko	Head of the Supreme Court of Ukraine

In the election, which took place on 26 March 2006, the bloc won 2.44% of the popular vote and no seat in the Verkhovna Rada, which was one of the main surprises of the election.

=== Ukrainian parliamentary election, 2007 ===
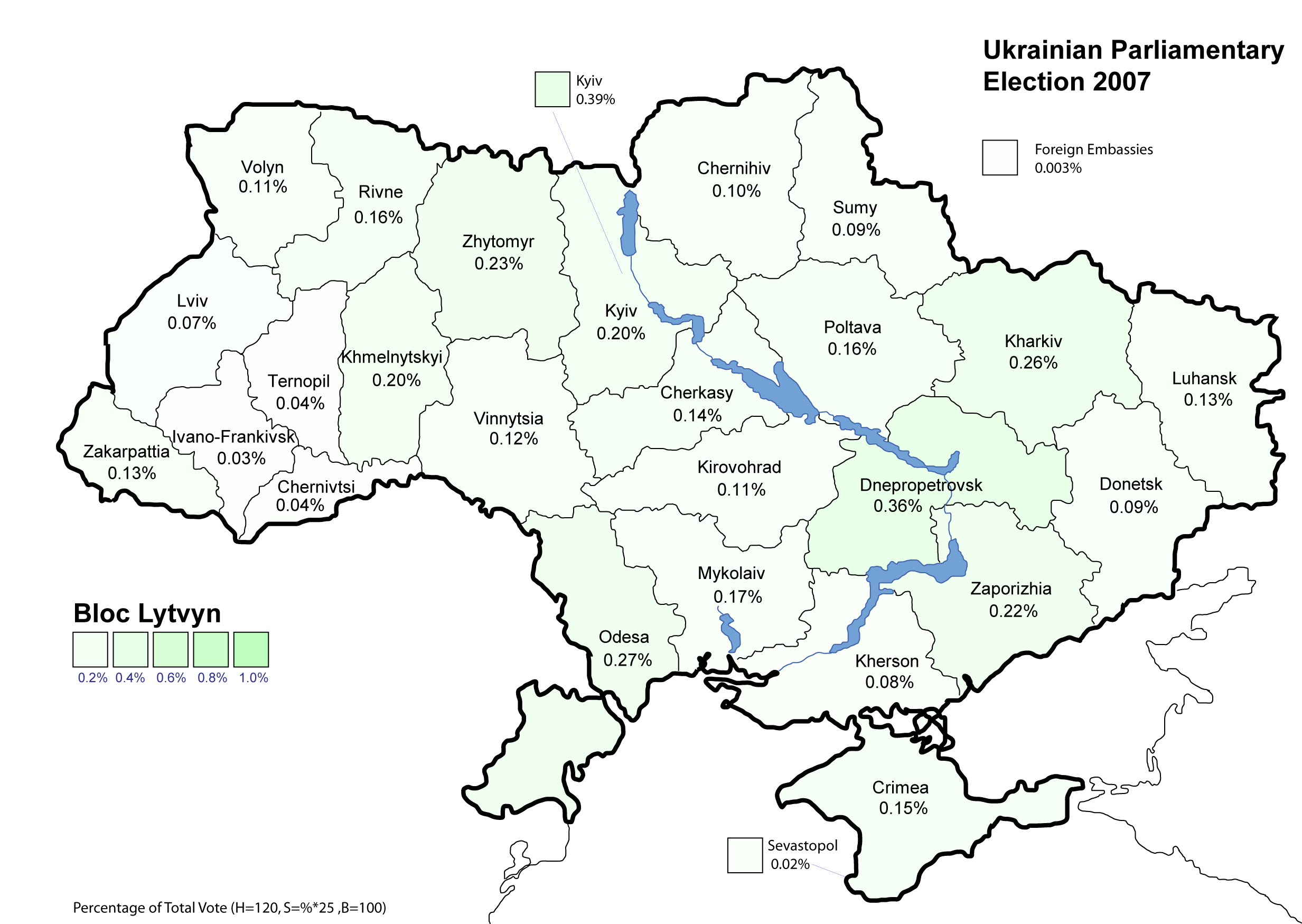
Map showing the results of the bloc percentage of total national vote) per region for the 2007 parliamentary election.

In the early parliamentary election held on September 30, 2007, the Lytvyn Bloc consisted of

- People's Party
- Labour Party

The bloc won 3.96% of the popular vote, with this result the block placed in fifth place, after the Communist Party and Our Ukraine–People's Self-Defense Bloc. It won 20 out of 450 seats.

After the 2008 Ukrainian political crisis the Lytvyn Bloc joined the ruling two party coalition. On December 16, 2008, a government was formed representing a 245-seat majority of the parliament, between the Lytvyn Bloc, the Yulia Tymoshenko Bloc and Our Ukraine–People's Self-Defense Bloc.

On February 21, 2010, during a party congress of Strong Ukraine (renamed Labor Party in November 2009) announced that it leaves the parliamentary faction of Lytvyn bloc and in an electoral alliance with the party Information Ukraine creating the Tigipko Bloc. One of the representatives of Lytvyn Bloc, however, noted that the members of parliament from Lytvyn Bloc cannot be recalled from the parliament, because they were elected as part of the parliamentary faction, but they may leave voluntarily if they will surrender their mandates.

On March 11, 2010, together with Party of Regions and Communist Party of Ukraine the bloc joined the first Azarov Government

In October 2010 one deputy of the Our Ukraine–People's Self-Defense Bloc faction joined the Lytvyn Bloc faction.

In November 2010 the Bloc of Lytvyn faction in the Verkhovna Rada was renamed People's Party faction.

=== Dissolution ===
A March 2010 poll predicted that a "Volodymyr Lytvyn Bloc" would get 1.3% of the vote at the 2012 Ukrainian parliamentary election.

In August 2011 People's Party and Strong Ukraine announced they will merge with fellow Ukrainian party Party of Regions. Strong Ukraine and Party of Regions merged on 17 March 2012. The merge between People's Party and Party of Regions did not materialize.

On 17 November 2011 the Ukrainian Parliament approved an election law that banned the participation of blocs of political parties in parliamentary elections.

Mid-December 2011 Lytvyn stated that People's Party will participate in the 2012 parliamentary elections independently. In that election, the party won 2 seats in the Ukrainian parliament.
