= Strong Ukraine =

Strong Ukraine Сильна Україна
- Leader: Serhiy Tyhypko
- Founded: 19 June 1999 23 April 2014(re-established)
- Ideology: Social liberalism
- Political position: Centre to centre-left
- National affiliation: Opposition Bloc (2019)
- Colours: Yellow Blue
- Verkhovna Rada (2019) (Note: Part of the Opposition Bloc (2019) until 2022.): 6 / 450

Website
- silnaukraina.com

Strong Ukraine (Ukrainian: Сильна Україна, romanized: Sylna Ukraina); formerly the Labour Party of Ukraine (Note: Ukrainian: Трудова партія України, romanized: Trudova partiia Ukrainy), is a political party in Ukraine that was re-established in April 2014. It was originally registered in August 1999 and dissolved in March 2012 after it had merged with the Party of Regions on 17 March 2012. Since late 2009 the party was and is the main vehicle of billionaire Serhiy Tihipko. After the parties merger Tihipko became a member of the Party of Regions. On 7 April 2014 the political council of this party expelled Tihipko from the Party of Regions.

The party claimed to have over 80,000 members in mid-May 2010.

In the 2014 Ukrainian parliamentary election the party won one constituency parliamentary seat.

== History ==
=== Labour Party Ukraine ===
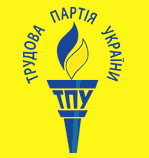
Labour Party Ukraine logo

Founded on 19 June 1999 as Labour Party Ukraine it did not participate in the legislative elections of 30 March 2002.

In the 2006 elections, the party failed as part of "Bloc Borys Olijnyk and Myhailo Syrota" to win parliamentary representation (the Bloc won 0,08% of the votes).

In the 2007 parliamentary elections the party was part of the Lytvyn Bloc alliance, that won 20 out of 450 seats.

=== Strong Ukraine ===
==== Re-branding and merger with Party of Regions ====
The party logo from November 2009 till the party obtained a new logo on 5 August 2014

On 28 November 2009, at the 10th Congress, Labour Party Ukraine was renamed Strong Ukraine.

Strong Ukraine endorsed its new leader Serhiy Tihipko (former partyleader of Labour Ukraine), also elected in November 2009, in the 2010 Ukrainian presidential election. Fellow billionaire Oleksandr Kardakov was another influential member of the party.

On 22 February 2010, during a party congress, the party announced it would compete in the 2012 Ukrainian parliamentary election not as part of the Lytvyn Bloc but in an electoral alliance with the party Information Ukraine.

On 11 March 2010 party leader Tihipko was elected as one of six deputy Prime Ministers (in charge of economic issues) in the Azarov Government.

A March 2010 poll predicted that the party would get 7.3% of the vote at the 2012 Ukrainian parliamentary election. A May 2010 poll by the Kyiv International Institute of Sociology showed that the party had the greatest support among voters in central Ukraine (11%), and less supported in the west and south (7%); the lowest number of this party's supporters was in east Ukraine (5%). At the 2010 local elections the party gained about 6% of the votes nationwide.

In the 2010 local elections the party won representative in 20 of the 24 regional parliaments and in the Supreme Council of Crimea.

In May 2011 the rating of the party had dropped to about 5% in election polls.

In August 2011 Tihipko and Prime Minister (and a Party of Regions (POR) leader) Mykola Azarov announced that Strong Ukraine and POR are going to team up and eventually Strong Ukraine will be merged into POR. Tihipko will become a POR member along with other Strong Ukraine representatives. Mid-December 2011 Tihipko predicted the unification process would be completed late January 2012; but he also warned that if "problematic issues" would not be solved Strong Ukraine would not merge. The parties merged on 17 March 2012. According to Sociological group "RATING" the party would have collected 3.1% of the votes if Ukrainian parliamentary election would have occurred in February 2012. In August 2012 experts believed potential voters of Tihipko and his Strong Ukraine! shifted their allegiance to Ukraine – Forward!. In the 28 October 2012 parliamentary elections Ukraine – Forward won 1.58% of the national votes and no constituencies and thus failed to win parliamentary representation.

==== Re-establishment ====
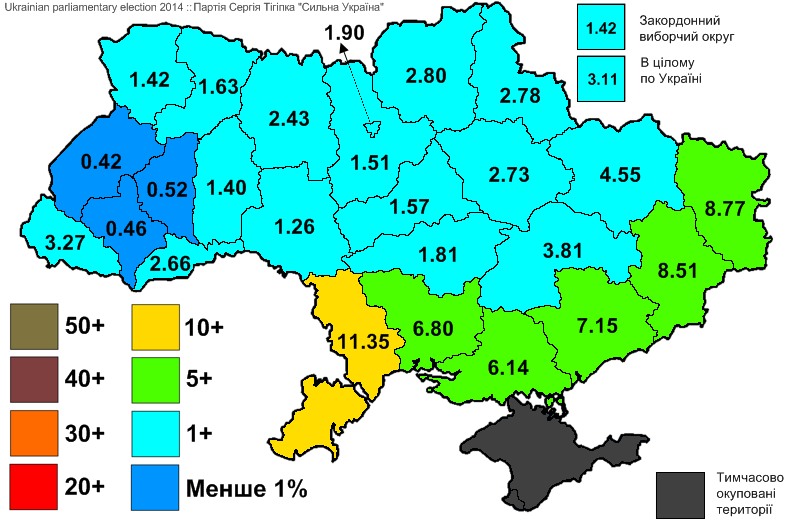
Party support (% of the votes cast) in different regions of Ukraine (in the 2014 election).

In March 2014 Tihipko became a self-nominated candidate for President of Ukraine in the 2014 presidential election. On 29 March a Party of Regions convention supported Mykhailo Dobkin's nomination as a presidential candidate. On 7 April 2014 the political council of the party expelled Tihipko from the party. He then accused that the party had "been turned into a branch of a specific financial and industrial group, a private enterprise". On 23 April 2014 Tihipko announced that Strong Ukraine would be revived and that its merger with Party of Regions had been "a mistake".

On 5 August 2014 the party held its first Congress since its re-establishment.

In the 2014 Ukrainian parliamentary election Tihipko headed the party list of the party, followed by former government minister Valeriy Khoroshkovskyi. In the election the party failed to clear the 5% election threshold (it got 3.11% of the votes) but did win one constituency seat and thus one parliamentary seat.

== Ideology and stances ==
According to Tihipko the party is "patriotic but not nationalistic". Tihipko has stated he wants to "unite the country".

Concerning the War in Donbas, on 5 August 2014 Tihipko said that in March and April 2014 the Yatsenyuk Government wasted a chance to resolve the conflict through negotiations, and that by early August 2014 this was no longer an option. He also stated that "Terrorists" and their supporters in the east of the country had passed a "point of no return". He supports a professional Ukrainian army to prevent the conflict spreading to other parts of the country. The party seeks a peaceful resolution to the conflict by negotiating with Russia through European mediators but not directly with the pro-Russian combatants.

== Election results ==
=== Verkhovna Rada ===
Year	Party vote	% of popular vote	Constituents won	Overall seats won	Seat change	Government
2002	did not participate		0 / 225	0 / 450	-	
2006	Borys Olijnyk and Myhailo Syrota Bloc		Party vote only	0 / 450	-	
2007	Lytvyn Bloc		Party vote only	20 / 450	▲20 (Note: Seats distributed on party list between Strong Ukraine and People's Party)	Coalition government
2012	merged with Party of Regions		0 / 225	0 / 450	▼20	
2014	491,471	3.1	1 / 225	1 / 450	▲1	Opposition
2019	Opposition Bloc (2019)		6 / 225	6 / 450	▲5	Opposition
