= Reforms for the Future =

Reforms for the Future Реформи заради майбутнього
- Leader: Ihor Rybakov
- Founded: 16 February 2011
- Dissolved: 15 December 2012

Reforms for the Future (Ukrainian: Реформи заради майбутнього, romanized: Reformy zarady maibutnoho) was a Ukrainian deputy group turned faction in its national parliament Verkhovna Rada created on February 16, 2011. Deputy Ihor Rybakov (earlier elected on the election list of the Bloc of Yulia Tymoshenko), is the group's faction leader. The faction supported the Azarov Government. All members of the group had individually already entered into the parliamentary coalition which supported this government. At its peak the group contained 21 deputies (in January 2012). In the parliament elected on 28 October 2012 that started its tasks on 15 December 2012 the faction was not re-created.

== History ==
Reforms for the Future started as a new deputy group in the Verkhovna Rada (Ukraine's parliament) on August 31, 2010. The Reforms for the Future deputy group stated in September 2010 that it intended to seek the rights of a parliamentary faction. After the cancellation of the Imperative Mandate on October 1, 2010 it became possible for 15 or more deputies to form a parliamentary faction (a lawmaker can join only one faction; the chairman and his two assistants cannot head factions of deputies). At that time, the deputy group consisted of 17 deputies expelled from the Yulia Tymoshenko Bloc–Batkivschyna faction (BYuT) and two deputies from the Our Ukraine–People's Self-Defense Bloc faction. MP Ivan Pliusch (at the time an independent MP) joined the group on February 15, 2011. Taras Chornovil joined Reforms for the Future soon after. Setting up a faction without a party is not uncommon in Ukraine's parliamentary history. Several influential parties have been founded after they had already founded a faction in the Verkhovna Rada, examples of this are the Party of Regions, All-Ukrainian Union "Fatherland" and Labour Ukraine.

Street advert for the faction in Kyiv (April 2011) near Kyiv Pechersk Lavra.

Rumours that the group was formed by businessmen who allegedly "fled" from BYuT "for fear of political persecution" have been denied by the group. Early 2012 Bloc Yulia Tymoshenko deputy Roman Zabzalyuk was briefly a member of the group; he claimed to investigate political corruption. He stated after rejoining the Bloc Yulia Tymoshenko early February 2012 that "They offer $500,000 for a transfer [to the parliamentary group], and then they pay a monthly salary of $20,000-25,000". In contrast, according to the deputy leader of the Reforms for Future group, Volodymyr Kapliyenko, Zabzalyuk had claimed he was "suffering a very serious disease" and the group had raised some $100,000 for Zabzalyuk to undergo surgery in Israel. The day after these allegations were made (9 February 2012) Chornovil left the faction. BYuT deputies claimed mid-February 2012 they had transferred the bribes Zabzalyuk had received to the Okhmatdyt National Children's Hospital.

In the parliament elected on 28 October 2012 that started its tasks on 15 December 2012 the faction was not re-created. But certain former members were re-elected to parliament.

== Issue stances ==
The group supported land reform, pension reform and raising of the retirement age. The group stated it basically supports all reforms initiated by Ukrainian President Viktor Yanukovych "but with corrections".
