= 2006 Ukrainian parliamentary election =

Parliamentary election in Ukraine

- 26 March 2006

All 450 seats in the Verkhovna Rada 226 seats needed for a majority
- Turnout: 67.55% (▼1.72 pp)
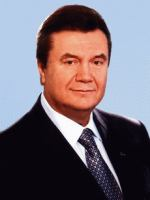

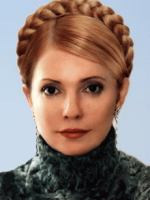

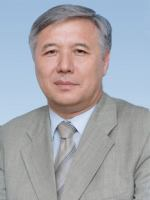

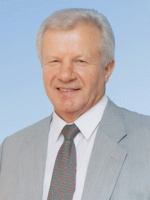

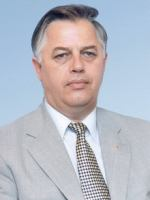
	First party	Second party	Third party
Leader	Viktor Yanukovych	Yulia Tymoshenko	Yuriy Yekhanurov
Party	Party of Regions	Tymoshenko Bloc	Our Ukraine Bloc
Leader since	19 April 2003	9 February 2001	25 November 2005
Last election	36 seats	22 seats, 7.54%	113 seats, 24.49%
Seats won	186	129	81
Seat change	▲150	▲107	▼32
Popular vote	8,148,745	5,652,876	3,539,140
Percentage	32.78%	22.75%	14.24%
Swing	–	▲15.21%	▼10.05%
	Fourth party	Fifth party
Leader	Oleksandr Moroz	Petro Symonenko
Party	SPU	KPU
Leader since	26 October 1991	19 June 1993
Last election	23 seats, 7.14%	64 seats, 20.76%
Seats won	33	21
Seat change	▲10	▼43
Popular vote	1,444,224	929,591
Percentage	5.81%	3.74%
Swing	▼1.33%	▼17.02%
- Results by electoral district
Prime Minister before election
Yuriy Yekhanurov
Our Ukraine Bloc
Elected Prime Minister
Viktor Yanukovych
Party of Regions

Parliamentary elections were held in Ukraine on 26 March 2006. Election campaigning officially began on 7 July 2005. Between November 26 and 31 December 2005, party lists of candidates were formed.

The election to the Ukrainian parliament, Verkhovna Rada, was held according to the party-list proportional election system—that is, in a single nationwide electoral district with votes being allocated to the political parties or election blocs rather than to individual candidates. In the previous parliamentary elections half of parliamentary representatives (deputies) were elected on proportional basis, while the other half were elected in single-mandate constituencies.

Following the Orange Revolution and the 2004 presidential elections in December 2004, Ukrainian parliament adopted significant changes (amendments) to the Constitution of Ukraine by introducing concepts of political coalition, coalition government, imperative mandate as well as transferred some power from the President to the parliament, making Ukraine a parliamentary-presidential democracy. Those amendments were to enter into force on 1 January 2006. The new constitutional amendment also abolished single member-districts and replacing them with an increased multi-member proportional representation. According to the election law and the system adopted, the political parties or election blocs need to collect at least 3% of the national vote in order to gain seats in parliament.

== Parties and electoral blocs registered ==
A record number of forty five parties registered for the election, with only five securing the minimum 3% quota required to elect representatives to the Ukrainian parliament. Seats in the Verkhovna Rada are allocated among those parties securing the 3% quota according to the largest remainder method of seat allocation, using the Hare quota. Each party meeting the 3% quota is entitled to appoint one representative for every 1/450 (approximately 0.22%) of the total vote allocated to all parties exceeding the 3% threshold, with remaining seats being awarded to the parties with the largest remaining fractions of 1/450 of the total vote allocated to all parties meeting the 3% threshold.

Name of the party or electoral bloc (number of candidates):

(Parties or blocs which have obtained at least 3% of the vote are in bold)

- **Communist Party of Ukraine** (449)
- **Party of Regions** (446)
- People's Movement of Ukraine for Unity (42)
- Party of Social Protection (20)
- Political Party "European Capital" (35)
- Nataliya Vitrenko Bloc "People's Opposition" (390)
  - Party "Rus'-Ukrainian Union"
  - Progressive Socialist Party of Ukraine
- All-Ukrainian Party of People's Trust (41)
- Lazarenko Bloc (130)
  - Party "Social Democratic Union"
  - Political Party All-Ukrainian Union "Hromada"
  - Social Democratic Party of Ukraine
- **Bloc "Our Ukraine"** (393)
  - Congress of Ukrainian Nationalists
  - People's Movement of Ukraine
  - Party of Industrialists and Entrepreneurs of Ukraine
  - Party of Christian Democratic Union
  - Political Party People's Union Our Ukraine
  - Ukrainian Republican Party "Assembly"
- Lytvyn's People's Bloc (444)
  - People's Party
  - Party of All-Ukrainian Union of the Left "Justice"
  - Ukrainian Peasant Democratic Party
- Party of National Economic Development of Ukraine (24)
- **Yuliya Tymoshenko Bloc** (409)
  - All-Ukrainian Union "Fatherland"
  - Ukrainian Social-Democratic Party
- **Socialist Party of Ukraine** (390)
- Electoral Bloc "Yevhen Marchuk - "Unity" (82)
  - Party of Freedom
  - Party "Solidarity of Women of Ukraine"
  - Ukrainian Party "Unity"
- Electoral Bloc of Political Parties of Borys Olijnyk and Myhailo Syrota (99)
  - Political Party "Informational Ukraine"
  - Political Party "Party of Health"
  - Labor Party of Ukraine
- "Oppositional bloc NE TAK!" (NOT YES!) (441)
  - Social Democratic Party of Ukraine (united)
  - Republican Party of Ukraine
  - "Women for the Future" All-Ukrainian Political Union
  - Political Party "All-Ukrainian Union "Center"
- Ukrainian People's Bloc of Kostenko and Plyusch (216)
  - Party of Free Peasants and Entrepreneurs of Ukraine
  - Political Party "Collected Ukraine"
  - Ukrainian People's Party
- Party of Greens of Ukraine (87)
- Block of People's Democratic Parties (376)
  - Democratic Party of Ukraine
  - People's Democratic Party
  - Christian Democratic Party of Ukraine
  - Christian Liberal Party of Ukraine
- Party "Viche" (58)
- Social Christian Party (36)
- Ukrainian Conservative Party (31)
- Party of Pensioners of Ukraine (93)
- Political party "Forwards, Ukraine!" (77)
- "Electoral bloc "State - Labor Union" (263)
  - All-Ukrainian Party of Laborious
  - Political Party "State"
- Electoral bloc of political parties "FOR UNION" (83)
  - Party "Socialist Ukraine"
  - Party "Union"
  - Political Party "Homeland"
  - Slavic Party
- Party "Renassainse" (86)
- Political Party "Working Ukraine" (20)
- Ukrainian Party "Green Planet" (28)
- Electoral Bloc "Power to the People" (173)
  - All-Ukrainian Party of Spirituality and Patriotism
  - All-Ukrainian Chernobyl People's Party "For Welfare and Social Protection of the People"
  - Party of Protection of Pensioners of Ukraine
- All-Ukrainian Party "New Force" (185)
- "Civil Bloc PORA-PRP" (244)
  - Civil Party "PORA"
  - Party "Reforms and Order"
- Liberal Party of Ukraine (43)
- Political Party of Ukraine "Party of PUTIN's Politics" (162)
- Social Ecological Party "Union. Chernobyl. Ukraine." (54)
- Bloc "Patriots of Ukraine" (99)
  - Patriotic Party of Ukraine
  - Ukrainian National Conservative Party
- "Yuriy Karmazin Bloc" (59)
  - All-Ukrainian Party of Peace and Unity
  - Party of Defenders of Homeland
  - Party "National Democratic Union "Ukraine"
- Party of Patriotic Forces of Ukraine (103)
- Political Party "Party of Ecological Rescue "EKO+25%" (140)
- Political Party Third Force (208)
- Ukrainian People's Assembly (22)
- All-Ukrainian Union "Freedom" (109)
- Peasant Party of Ukraine (65)
- Bloc of Partyless "Sun" (129)
- Ukrainian Party of Honor, Combating Corruption, and Organized Crime (44)

== Opinion polls ==
According to earlier polls, front-runners where Party of Regions on 34%, Yulia Tymoshenko Bloc on 24%, as well as President Yushchenko's People's Union Our Ukraine.

Two other political forces that where virtually assured to pass a 3% barrier where the Socialist Party of Ukraine headed by Oleksander Moroz and the bloc of the current Speaker of Verkhovna Rada, Volodymyr Lytvyn (based on his former Agrarian Party of Ukraine renamed to the People's Party).

The Communist Party of Ukraine, which has progressively received fewer and fewer votes with each election (25% in 1998, 20% in 2002), was expected to continue their decline in voter support.

Whilst some parties have nominated over 400 candidates, it was always unlikely that any single Party would elect over 200 members. In order to form a Government, under Ukraine's constitution, parties will need to form a coalition with two or more voting blocks within the first month following the declaration of the polls.

=== Razumkov Centre Poll ===
Each 2 weeks Razumkov Centre held a representative national survey.

Table 1 shows the results for the parties likely to pass the three percent threshold.

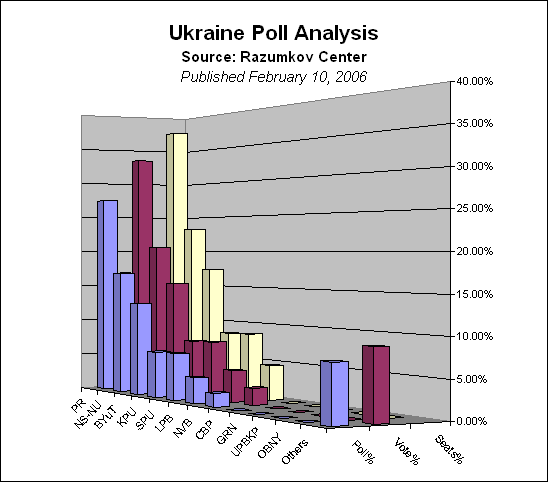
Graph showing latest poll #3, Jan(2)by Razumkov published Feb 2006

Table 1: Ukrainian parliamentary election, 2006, Survey
Party or electoral bloc	Nov. 2005	Jan. 2006 (1)	Jan. 2006 (2)
Party of Regions	17.5%	24.7%	27.4%
Bloc "Our Ukraine"	13.5%	15.4%	16.9%
Yuliya Tymoshenko Bloc	12.4%	12.0%	12.7%
Socialist Party of Ukraine	5.6%	4.6%	6.3%
Communist Party of Ukraine	5.8%	4.6%	6.2%
Lytvyn's People's Bloc	3.3%	3.0%	3.4%
Nataliya Vitrenko Bloc "People's Opposition"	2.6%	2.5%	1.8%
Other	5.3%	7.7%	7.4%
Against all	6.7%	3.9%	4.1%
Will not vote	6.4%	2.5%	3.1%
Does not know/no opinion	20.9%	19.1%	10.5%
Not answered	-	-	0.2%
Total	100.0%	100.0%	100.0%
number of respondents	1993	2290	2016
precision (p-value)	2.3%	2.1%	2.3%

The latest Razumkov poll shows a consolidation of voter opinion and if the results of the poll are a true indication of voter intention the voter participation rate will be above 90% of registered voters. Voting in Ukraine is not compulsory. Votes below the 3% threshold are discarded which increases the proportional share of seats allocated to the remaining party/blocs. There is still 10.5% of voters undecided.

=== Kyiv International Institute of Sociology ===
Kyiv International Institute of Sociology presented the latest poll on 9 February based on a survey during 20–27 January.

Table 2 shows the Kyiv International Institute of Sociology (KIIS) poll results for the parties likely to pass the three percent threshold.

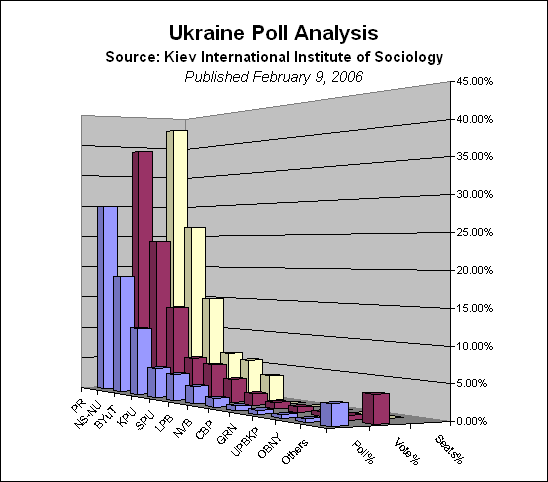
Graph showing poll results by Kyiv International Institute of Sociology published Feb 2006

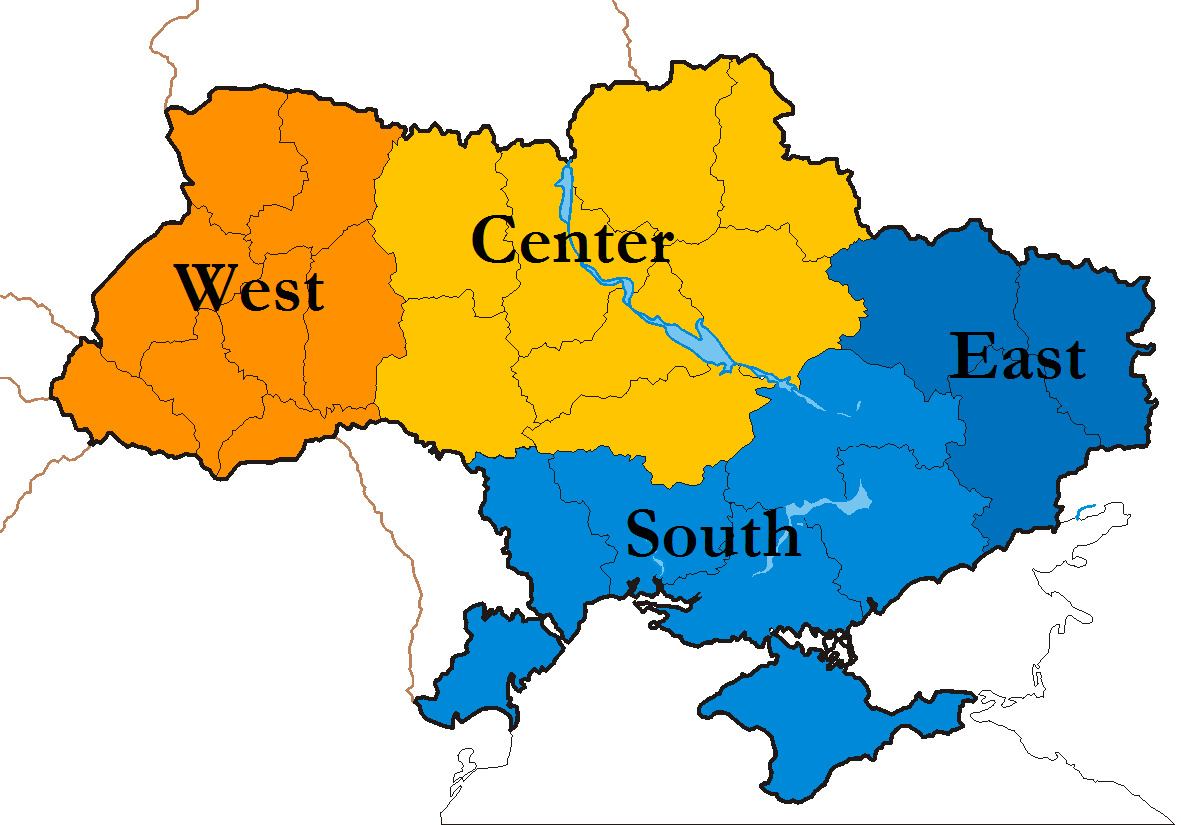
Regional division used by KIIS

Table 2: Ukrainian parliamentary election, January 2006, Survey
Party or electoral bloc	Ukraine	West	Center	South	East
Party of Regions	29.9%	5.0%	8.5%	43.5%	68.1%
Bloc "Our Ukraine"	18.5%	38.4%	23.4%	9.6%	2.3%
Yuliya Tymoshenko Bloc	10.4%	16.6%	16.6%	5.3%	2.0%
Socialist Party of Ukraine	4.0%	2.1%	8.9%	2.0%	1.5%
Communist Party of Ukraine	4.5%	0.9%	4.3%	6.5%	6.0%
Lytvyn's People's Bloc	2.6%	1.8%	3.8%	3.7%	0.4%
Nataliya Vitrenko Bloc "People's Opposition"	1.3%	0.7%	0.3%	2.5%	1.8%
Civic Bloc "PORA"	0.7%	1.9%	0.3%	0.7%	0.2%
Greens Party	0.6%	0.3%	1.0%	0.6%	0.2%
Ukrainian People's Bloc of Kostenko and Plyusch	0.5%	1.1%	0.7%	0.2%	0.0%
Opposition Bloc "Ne Tak"	0.5%	0.6%	0.2%	0.7%	0.7%
Other (less than 0.4% each)	3.0%	1.6%	4.1%	3.6%	1.9%
Undecided	13.5%	20.5%	13.7%	12.6%	7.3%
Against all	5.7%	4.2%	10.2%	3.3%	4.0%
Does not vote	4.3%	4.3%	4.0%	5.2%	3.6%
Total	100.0%	100.0%	100.0%	100.0%	100.0%

The map to the right shows the non administrative regional division used by KIIS: The Western region (orange) comprises the eight oblasts of the west - Volyn, Rivne, Lviv, Ivano-Frankivsk, Ternopil, Khmelnytskyi, Transcarpathia, and Chernivtsi oblasts; the Central region (yellow) is made up by Zhytomyr, Vinnytsia, Kirovohrad, Cherkasy, Poltava, Sumy, Chernihiv and Kyiv oblasts as well as the city of Kyiv; the Southern region (light blue) consists of Dnipropetrovsk, Odesa, Mykolaiv, Kherson, Zaporizhzhia oblasts, the Autonomous Republic of Crimea and the city of Sevastopol; the Eastern region (dark blue) includes Kharkiv, Donetsk and Luhansk oblasts

=== Exit polls ===
National exit poll 2006	Exit-poll Ukrainian sociology service	Exit-poll "FOM-Ukraine"
Party of Regions - 33.28%; Yuliya Tymoshenko Bloc - 22.72%; Bloc "Our Ukraine" - 13.53%; Socialist Party of Ukraine - 5.37%; Communist Party of Ukraine - 3.46%; Nataliya Vitrenko Bloc - 3.35%; Volodymyr Lytvyn Bloc - 2.7%; "Viche" - 2.2%; Pora-PPR - 1.34%; Plyusch-Kostenko Bloc - 1.72%; "Ne Tak" - 1.2%; Against all - 1.16%	Party of Regions - 27.5%; Yuliya Tymoshenko Bloc - 21.6%; Bloc "Our Ukraine" - 15.6%; Socialist Party of Ukraine - 5.5%; Volodymyr Lytvyn Bloc - 5.1%; Communist Party of Ukraine - 4.7%; Nataliya Vitrenko Bloc - 3.2%; "Ne Tak" - 2.8%; Pora-PPR - 2.7%; "Viche" - 1.9%; Against all - 1.72%	Party of Regions - 31.4%; Yuliya Tymoshenko Bloc - 22.9%; Bloc "Our Ukraine" - 17%; Socialist Party of Ukraine - 6.9%; Communist Party of Ukraine - 3.9%; Nataliya Vitrenko Bloc - 2.9%; Volodymyr Lytvyn Bloc - 2.5%; Plusch-Kostenko Bloc - 1.7%; "Viche" 1.4%; Pora-PPR - 1.3%; "Ne Tak" - 1.1%; Against all - 1.8%

Source: Korrespondent.net

== Results ==
On 10 April the Central Election Commission (CVK) announced the final results of vote counting. Out of 45 parties, only 5 passed the required 3% electoral threshold (see the table below).

Comparing the results with early polls (but not with 2005 opinion polls), it was unexpected that President Viktor Yushchenko's party "Our Ukraine" received less than 14% of the national vote, coming third after the Party of Regions, and the Yulia Tymoshenko Bloc.

As per preliminary results, the Ukrainian Communist Party was soundly trounced, getting less than 4% of the vote and 21 deputies as a result, as opposed to their 20% in the 2002 elections.

The People's Opposition Bloc of Natalia Vitrenko did not pass the electoral threshold collecting only 2.93% of total votes recorded, 0.07% short of the required 3% electoral threshold. According to the law the threshold is calculated based on the total number of the voted ballots, including the general non-confidence votes (i.e. ballots of those who voted against all parties listed) as well as invalid votes (e.g. votes for more than one party as such option is not provided by electoral law). If such votes were excluded from the total, then Vitrenko party would have received over 3% of the formal vote. Commenting the preliminary results the leader of the Opposition Bloc, Natalia Vitrenko expressed: "On what basis does the CEC show the number of voters as 25 million 250 thousand? According to the CEC in Ukraine, 2% of the votes are invalid and 1.8% are "against all", therefore these figures should be excluded. The base for calculations should not be more than 24 million 500 thousand - and this is 3% of the amount that the CEC counted for our bloc." Nonetheless, according to the Law on Election, Article 1.4 "The mandates are distributed to the parties (blocs) that obtained no less than three percent of votes of voters that participated in the election"

A set of parties which did not pass the electoral threshold, notably People's Opposition Bloc of Natalia Vitrenko and the Opposition Bloc "Ne Tak" have made claims of the elections being highly falsified and asked for vote recount. Recent reports in the media have indicated that Ukraine's President has also suggested that if necessary a partial recount of the 26 March ballot should be made. If significant mistakes were made in the tally of votes there is a chance for Opposition Block of Natalia Vitrenko to exceed the 3% threshold required by law.

Over 22% of voters who supported minor candidates (with less than the 3%) will not be represented by the parties elected due to the electoral method used (party list proportional representation with an election threshold).

Party	Votes	%	Seats	+/–
Party of Regions	8,148,745	32.78	186	+150
Yulia Tymoshenko Bloc	5,652,876	22.74	129	+107
Our Ukraine	3,539,140	14.24	81	–31
Socialist Party of Ukraine	1,444,224	5.81	33	+11
Communist Party of Ukraine	929,591	3.74	21	–44
People's Opposition Bloc of Natalia Vitrenko	743,704	2.99	0	0
People's Bloc of Lytvyn	619,905	2.49	0	New
Ukrainian National Bloc of Kostenko and Plyushch	476,155	1.92	0	New
Viche	441,912	1.78	0	0
Civil Bloc "PORA–PRP"	373,478	1.50	0	New
Opposition Bloc "Ne Tak"	257,106	1.03	0	–27
Revival	245,188	0.99	0	New
Yuriy Karmazin Bloc	165,881	0.67	0	New
Party of Greens of Ukraine	137,858	0.55	0	0
Block of People's Democratic Parties	126,586	0.51	0	New
Party of Environmental Salvation "EKO+25%"	120,238	0.48	0	New
Ukrainian Party "Green Planet"	96,734	0.39	0	New
Svoboda	91,321	0.37	0	0
Peasant Party of Ukraine	79,160	0.32	0	0
Lazarenko Bloc (Hromada–SDS–SDPU)	76,950	0.31	0	0
Party of National Economic Development of Ukraine	60,195	0.24	0	–1
For Union (Soyuz–SU–SP–Motherland)	51,569	0.21	0	New
Party of Pensioners of Ukraine	51,097	0.21	0	0
State – Labour Union	36,396	0.15	0	0
Third Force	34,963	0.14	0	New
People's Movement of Ukraine for Unity	34,723	0.14	0	0
Party of Putin Policy	30,917	0.12	0	New
All-Ukrainian Party of People's Trust	29,899	0.12	0	0
Ukrainian Party of Honor, Struggle against Corruption and Organized Crime	28,818	0.12	0	New
Party of Patriotic Forces of Ukraine	26,553	0.11	0	New
Ukrainian Conservative Party	25,123	0.10	0	New
Labour Ukraine	24,942	0.10	0	–10
Power of People (ZDTSZN)	24,243	0.10	0	New
Social-Environmental Party "Union. Chornobyl. Ukraine"	23,987	0.10	0	New
Social Christian Party	22,953	0.09	0	New
Bloc Borys Olijnyk and Myhailo Syrota	21,649	0.09	0	New
Yevhen Marchuk – Unity (SZhU–Ye)	17,004	0.07	0	–4
Ukrainian National Assembly	16,379	0.07	0	–1
Party of Social Security	14,649	0.06	0	New
Block of Nonpartisans "The Sun"	12,620	0.05	0	New
All-Ukrainian Party "New Force"	12,522	0.05	0	0
Liberal Party of Ukraine	12,098	0.05	0	–1
European Capital	12,027	0.05	0	New
Patriot of Ukraine	11,503	0.05	0	0
Forward, Ukraine!	6,934	0.03	0	–1
Against all	449,650	1.81	–	–
Total	24,860,165	100.00	450	0
Valid votes	24,860,165	98.06		
Invalid/blank votes	490,595	1.94		
Total votes	25,350,760	100.00		
Registered voters/turnout	37,528,884	67.55		
Source: Central Electoral Commission

=== Maps ===
Maps showing the top six parties support - percentage of total national vote (minimal text)
Party of Regions results (32.14%)	Bloc Yulia Tymoshenko results (22.29%)	Our Ukraine results (13.95%)
Communist Party of Ukraine results (3.66%)	Bloc Lytvyn Party results (2.44%)	Socialist Party of Ukraine results (5.69%)

== Reactions ==
According to Arabic newsmedia Al Jazeera, Party of Regions had alleged that the general elections had been marred by irregularities and poor organisation as the first exit polls were published. But while acknowledging some organisational problems, most other parties and Western observers have given the vote a largely clean bill of health.

Russian newspaper Izvestia predicts that Ukraine can expect more political instability and worsening economic situation.

According to Russian online newspaper Gazeta.Ru, Tymoshenko, Yushchenko and the Socialists can form a coalition. Yulia Tymoshenko was sure she will become a new PM. Yushchenko and Georgian President Saakishvili already congratulated her with victory.,,

According to Russian news agency RIA Novosti, Tymoshenko promised to reconsider the Russian-Ukrainian gas deal.

The Washington Post informed that Yushchenko's party was beaten into a humiliating third place in parliamentary elections as the pro-Russian party of the man he defeated for the presidency 16 months ago appeared headed for a clear victory, according to exit polls. The Party of Regions, led by Viktor Yanukovych, who was defeated by Yushchenko in 2004 following massive street protests known as the Orange Revolution, secured a commanding 33.3 percent of the vote, according to one poll. A second exit poll gave his party 27.5 percent.

On 27 March, Arabic Al Jazeera reported that Yulia Tymoshenko, the former PM, had scored a triumph in parliamentary elections with her own bloc coming second and placing her in a position to form a coalition government. Viktor Yanukovich's pro-Russian Regions party won the most seats, but Tymoshenko emerged as a rejuvenated political figure, saying that "Orange Revolution" liberals could close ranks to keep the pro-Russian party in opposition. The outcome was a double humiliation for Viktor Yushchenko, the president, who defeated Yanukovich in a presidential poll re-run after December's 2004 street protests, and later fell out with Tymoshenko, his former Orange Revolution comrade.

According to Forbes, Tymoshenko urged her estranged Orange Revolution allies to form a united front against their old pro-Russian nemesis, who was leading in early results from a weekend parliamentary election. Proposed coalition talks, which were supposed to get under way Monday, were delayed indefinitely.

Russian online newspaper Lenta.ru reported that activists of Vitrenko's party erected tents and started boycotting the premises of Ukrainian Central Election Commission in protest of alleged violations. . According to Ukrainian news agency Interfax-Ukraine and Ukrainian online newspaper Ukrainska Pravda the tents are mostly empty.

== Government formation ==
Following the 2004 constitutional amendments, a concept of coalition government replaced the existing concept of majority government.

The formation of coalition government was delayed and triggered post-election political "trade offs". On 22 June 2006 there finally was signed a coalition agreement between Bloc of Yulia Tymoshenko, Bloc "Our Ukraine", and the Socialist Party of Ukraine forming the Coalition of Democratic Forces. However, political trading continued on and appointment of new government was getting suspended. Because of delay, the Socialist Party withdrew its signature from the coalition agreement and on 7 July 2006 signed new coalition agreement with the Party of Regions and the Communist Party of Ukraine forming the so-called Alliance of National Unity. That led to re-appointment of Viktor Yanukovych as Prime Minister on 4 August, with the backing of 30 deputies of the "Our Ukraine" Bloc, after the parties agreed on the principals of state policy expressed in the Universal of National Unity.

The political scandal led to early parliamentary elections after the President Viktor Yushchenko dissolved the parliament.
