= Yuriy Lutsenko's People's Self-Defense =

Yuriy Lutsenko's People's Self-Defense (People's Self-Defense) Народна Самооборона Юрія Луценка
- Leader: Yuriy Lutsenko
- Founded: April 13, 2007
- Headquarters: Kyiv, Ukraine
- International affiliation: None
- Colours: Dark Red and White

Website
- https://web.archive.org/web/20100405094338/http://www.nso.org.ua/ua/about

The Yuriy Lutsenko's People's Self-Defense (Ukrainian: Народна Самооборона Юрія Луценка) was a Ukrainian electoral bloc.

In the parliamentary elections on 30 September 2007, the bloc was part of the Our Ukraine alliance, that won 72 out of 450 seats. (In the following 2012 elections the participation of blocs of political parties was banned.)

Yuriy Lutsenko was the party leader.

== History ==
The electoral bloc was created on April 13, 2007 and was based on the civil movement that was created several months earlier. The bloc consists of two parties Forward, Ukraine! and Christian-Democratic Union. It participated in the parliamentary elections of 2007 later forming a deputy group within the Our Ukraine alliance.

In July 2007, the old Our Ukraine bloc had been reorganized with Civil Movement "People's Self-Defense" into the Our Ukraine–People's Self-Defense Bloc for the 2007 parliamentary election in September 2007. The member parties had planned to merge into a single party in December 2007 but on November 16, 2007 People’s Self-Defense decided to end its participation in the process of forming a united party since then that process is unclear. The alliance currently holds 72 out of 450 parliamentary seats.

The party's parliamentary faction did not support the dismissal of the second Tymoshenko Government.

In an interview with the Silski Visti (Village News) newspaper on January 29, 2009 Yuriy Lutsenko declared that The People's Self-Defense as an insurgent, protesting, and not very structured civil movement has ceased to exist. Lutsenko also said he was planning to direct the organizational changes to the political party Forward, Ukraine!. In April 2010 Forward, Ukraine! renamed itself People's Self-Defense Political Party. Lutsenko became leader of that party.

In November 2011 the participation of blocs of political parties in parliamentary elections was banned. The People's Self-Defense Political Party merged with All-Ukrainian Union "Fatherland".

== Parliamentarians ==
- Volodymyr Aryev
- Oleksandr Doniy
- Yuriy Hrymchak
- Hennadiy Moskal
- Viktor Shemchuk
- Yuriy Stets
- Taras Stetskiv

=== Expelled parliamentarians ===
The following deputies were expelled from the Our Ukraine–People's Self-Defense Bloc fraction in September 2011 because of supporting the Azarov Government.

- Oleh Novikov
- Oleksandr Omelchenko
- Kateryna Lukyanova
- Serhiy Vasylenko
- Volodymyr Marushchenko
- Serhiy Kharovsky

Oleksandr Bobyliov became a member of Reforms for the Future in 2010.

== See also ==
- Civil Movement "People's Self-Defense"
