= 2008 Ukrainian political crisis =

2008 political crisis in Ukraine

The 2008 Ukrainian political crisis started after President Viktor Yushchenko's Our Ukraine–People's Self-Defense Bloc (NU-NS) withdrew from the governing coalition following a vote on a bill (4 September 2008) to limit the President's powers in which the Prime Minister's Bloc Yulia Tymoshenko (BYuT) voted with the opposition Party of Regions. The bill would have required the consent of the Prime Minister for the appointment and dismissal of the Prosecutor General by the President, given the government power to appoint local heads of government if the President rejects the candidates, stripped from the President the right to reject a candidate for Prime Minister, dismiss the Defense, Interior and Foreign Ministers, and appoint a head of the State Intelligence Service. President Yushchenko stated that a clear position on the 2008 Russo-Georgian War was one of the conditions under which return to talks in the Parliament (Verkhovna Rada) was possible, as well as the repeal of all the constitutional laws adopted after 3 September. Yushchenko claimed that a "de-facto coalition" was formed with 'no other aims but to conduct coup d'état and usurp power in the country'. Tymoshenko stated that the real intentions behind the President's party in 'declaring war on her' was to ensure his victory in the next presidential election, although she still called for a reformation of the coalition between the two parties. She also reiterated her position on the Georgian conflict, claiming to be neutral and more in line with the European Union.

On 16 September, the collapse of the BYuT/NU-NS coalition was officially announced. Following the failure to re-create the coalition, the Ukrainian parliament was dissolved by president Yushchenko on 8 October 2008, giving way to the third parliamentary election in three years.

The crisis ended when the Orange Coalition was reformed on 9 December 2008, but including Lytvyn's Bloc after Volodymyr Lytvyn was elected as parliamentary speaker the day before.

== Treason accusation ==
During the conflict between Russia and Georgia, Ukraine's President Viktor Yushchenko issued a decree requiring advance notice of the movements of the Russian Black Sea Fleet into and out of the Ukrainian port of Sevastopol. He also came out strongly in support of Georgia's President Mikheil Saakashvili, condemning Russia's invasion in Georgia during the August 2008 Russo-Georgian War. Prime Minister Tymoshenko and her Yulia Tymoshenko Bloc put forward a less critical position towards Russia and the Prime Minister herself was out of public view during much of the conflict. On 18 August 2008 Yushchenko's office accused Prime Minister Tymoshenko of taking a softer position as a way to win the support of Russia during the 2010 Presidential election. Andriy Kyslynskyi, the president's deputy chief of staff, said Tymoshenko's actions showed "signs of high treason and political corruption" adding that documents supporting these allegations were being handed over to prosecutors. Tymoshenko denied the accusations and rejected the accusation that she was soft in her support for Georgia, saying that she supported the "sovereignty and territorial integrity of Georgia" but she does not agree with the president's tough stance on the Black Sea Ports and defends her position as being "in line with the European Union and not to drag Ukraine into conflicts".

Andriy Semchenko, an MP from the Tymoshenko bloc, called on the President and the head of the President's Secretariat Viktor Baloha to apologize to the Prime Minister before there could be constructive work in the coalition. He said it was not appropriate for the President and Baloha to spread information that Tymoshenko was a traitor.

== Coalition collapses ==
On 1 September 2008 Prime Minister Tymoshenko put forward draft legislation which would facilitate the procedure for impeachment, though she insisted it would not affect President Yushchenko and was meant for future presidents. When the legislation came to a vote two days later, Tymoshenko's bloc voted together with the Party of Regions and Communists to pass it. They also approved legislation limiting the powers of the President while increasing the powers of the Prime Minister. In particular the parties approved legislation which would strip the President of the right to reject a candidate for Prime Minister, dismiss the Defense, Interior and Foreign Ministers and appoint a head of the State Intelligence Service. Yushchenko promised to veto the legislation.

Following the vote President Yushchenko's bloc pulled out of the governing coalition saying Tymoshenko was colluding with the opposition and the President warned he would call a snap election if a new coalition was not formed within the required time. He further accused Tymoshenko of trying to set up a "dictatorship of the prime minister" and calling the parliamentary vote "a political and constitutional coup d'état." Tymoshenko rejected the allegations and said the real reason the president "declared a war against me is to ensure his victory in the next presidential elections." In spite of this Tymoshenko has called for restoring the coalition between the two groups. She also defended her position on Georgia saying it was "in line with the European Union and it is not to drag Ukraine into conflicts." Parliament further increased the powers of the Prime Minister by passing legislation requiring the appointment and dismissal of the Prosecutor General by the President to receive the consent of the Prime Minister and giving the government power to appoint local heads of government if the President rejects the candidates.

On 8 September, Our Ukraine MP Andry Parubij claimed Tymoshenko and Regions had already reached a deal on forming a new government and were dividing up posts for a new cabinet (a claim Tynoshenko has denied). He also said that if a coalition is formed between Tymoshenko's bloc and Regions, Our Ukraine would appeal to the Constitutional Court to assess the legality of the December 2004 changes made in the constitution which, if successful, would restore wide powers held by the office of president. During the "Freedom of Speech" program on 9 September 2008 Tymoshenko said she was "categorically against" the decrees made by Yushchenko on the Russian Black Sea Fleet saying they risked provoking a response from Russia.

On 10 September, Tymoshenko reiterated her call for the coalition to be restored, but said she would not accept any preconditions for Our Ukraine to return. She also said at the moment they were not discussing any other coalition. Tymoshenko added that a snap poll would "destroy the normal life of the country" so it was not a way out of the crisis.

The same day Yan Bernazyuk, Yushchenko's liaison to the government of Tymoshenko, said representatives of the Presidential Secretariat were not allowed to attend the government session. Bernazyuk claimed the reason was because the government was discussing four issues which had a "clear Kremlin face" concerning "permits on use of mineral products without any contests, sales, and tenders." Yushchenko urged representatives and members of the regional, city and district councils to unite against the formation of a new coalition by retaining the "democratic coalition" in the local governments as well as for all other "national forces" to unite. He said the new relationship between the Tymoshenko bloc and Regions was a "serious threat for democratic choice of Ukraine" which was in danger of reconsidering "national priorities to principles of democratic governing, including the local one."

Officials from the Party of Regions accused Yushchenko of planning to impose direct presidential rule by dissolving the parliament without calling early elections. At the same time members of the Central Election Commission sympathetic to Yushchenko would resign prolonging the time without an acting parliament. Another claim said Yushchenko had secretly instructed the oblast governors and leaders of NGOs to request the imposition of a direct presidential rule by Yushchenko and that he would launch a military coup. Yushchenko denied planning to resolve the crisis with force saying Ukraine can resolve the crisis in a "democratic way" through dialogue.

On 16 September, the collapse of the BYuT/NU-NS coalition was officially announced. Yulia Tymoshenko unleashed one of her harshest attacks on Yushchenko yet, accusing the President of destroying the gains of the Orange Revolution, sinking hopes of rebuilding the coalition. "Since 2004, this president has managed to destroy everything: people's faith in the ideals of the revolution and faith in the president himself – only 5 percent still support him," she told reporters after a cabinet meeting. "Unfortunately, this president will leave a legacy of shattered remnants of the 'orange' promises and democratic coalitions, of his own team and even of his friends and his own political standing." Tymoshenko also blamed Yushchenko for "everything bad that will happen in relations between Ukraine and Russia" calling for Ukraine to pursue a more "balanced" policy towards Russia. Yushchenko accused Tymoshenko and the Party of Regions of trying to create a two party system in parliament. The two blocs joined forces in drafting and registering a new law in parliament on 17 September that would introduce a two-round election system for parliament which would likely lead to BYuT and Regions being the only parties in parliament after the next election. Viktor Yanukovich said his party did not want to initiate early elections and added "The Constitution must be changed so as to provide efficient operation of authorities."

Yuri Lutsenko leader of Civil Movement "People's Self-Defense" (part of the Our Ukraine–People's Self-Defense Bloc) said on 17 September 2008 that the breakup of the coalition was provoked by the Secretariat of the President and that "People's Self Defense" was categorically against it.

On 18 September, Yulia Tymoshenko refused to resign as prime minister as agreed under a coalition pact saying "The coalition has not collapsed.... It's the president and part of his team betraying the democratic coalition who have left it unilaterally." She also made reference to the alleged poisoning plot that almost killed President Viktor Yushchenko in 2004 by saying "The main poisoning is the poisoning with unlimited power, a serious intoxication in the presidential secretariat." Yushchenko accused Tymoshenko of not providing adequate funding for Ukraine's military and asked when she would show respect to Ukraine's soldiers.

President Yushchenko later said Tymoshenko was working with the Party of Regions, and the Communist Party on decisions aimed at destabilizing the country in order to establish a new political regime. Yuriy Yekhanurov, Ukraine's Defense Minister and member of Yushchenko's Our Ukraine bloc, said he and his political force would take all effort necessary to maintain the stability of the country. On 19 September Yulia Tymoshenko called the information about the existence of an informal coalition between BYuT, the Party of Regions and Communist Part of Ukraine "black political propaganda". The Premier believed that the spreading of such information was aimed at changing the arrangement of political forces leading up to the Ukrainian presidential elections in 2010. She also stated: "I think that this (the creation of a coalition of a different format) can be a last resort and forced step before the dissolving of the Verkhovna Rada, the Communists have nothing to do with this". On 22 September Our Ukraine issued a statement which said: "People's Union Our Ukraine call on everybody, for who the values of independence and freedom are more important than personal or group interests, to unite around President of Ukraine Victor Yushchenko, as a guarantor of the national state, and around Our Ukraine, as the only real force defending Ukrainian interests in the current Verkhovna Rada" and called on BYuT members to "put interests of nation before the interests of party leaders, to refuse being accomplices of the plot (to revise the Ukrainian Constitution and give all power to the hands of the pro-Kremlin parliamentary oligarchs), and to take part in the unification process of Ukrainian democratic forces".

On 26 September 2008, Tymoshenko suggested holding early parliamentary and presidential elections as a way out of the crisis. Tymoshenko said in parliament she would accept any conditions of Our Ukraine "in order to preserve Ukraine's strategic orientation, to preserve the parliament and not to throw the country into a new crisis." Talks were on track to reforge the orange coalition by early October 2008. But no coalition was formed on 8 October and in the evening of 8 October while visiting Italy President Yushchenko announced Ukraine's third general election in less than three years in a pre-recorded speech on Ukrainian television.

== Opposition to Presidential decree ==
Most politicians, besides the president's closest allies, denounced the decree, with even some Yushchenko sympathisers and allies from the Presidents own party, vowing to challenge his action in the courts. On 10 October the People’s Self-Defense (PSD) leader Yuriy Lutsenko announced that all democratic forces should unite into a single democratic bloc on basis of BYuT at the snap poll. Although other PSD members disagreed and rather continued to collaborate with Our Ukraine.

International reactions were also negative: the European Union did hope beforehand that there will be no snap elections and Poland’s former President Aleksander Kwaśniewski, stated that by dissolving the Verkhovna Rada, Yushchenko "shot himself in the foot."

On 16 October, after resistance, the cabinet endorsed amendments to the 2008 national budget to finance the snap elections.

Proposal by (19 October) by Yulia Tymoshenko to create a "megacoalition" and by Viktor Yanukovych (23 October) to create an "anti-crisis government" in the Ukrainian Parliament and postpone the snap elections until the threat of the 2008 financial crisis had passed lead to nothing.

On 29 October the Ukrainian parliament (Verkhovna Rada) voted against a bill to finance the early elections. On 31 October, the Verkhovna Rada refused to include a provision on funding snap parliamentary elections into a bill on immediate anti-financial crisis measures.

=== Juridical challenge of Presidential decree ===
The Kyiv District Administrative Court on 11 October 2008 suspended Yushchenko's election call, responding to a lawsuit filed by BYuT MPs. Tymoshenko refused to approve funds for the election, stating that Ukraine couldn't afford an early election and that she expected parliament to refuse the necessary funds, as well. Yushchenko appealed the suspension on the basis that he had fired the judge who gave the order beforehand. Prime Minister Tymoshenko and President Yushchenko dispatched rival security forces to the appeals and Tymoshenko's supporters planned to hold a round-the-clock vigil at the court to prevent illegal action from taking place. On 13 October President Yushchenko liquidated the Kyiv District Administrative Court altogether. On 15 October, Kyiv Regional Administrative Court suspended the president decree on liquidation of the Kyiv District Administrative after the Supreme Court of Ukraine had asked Yushchenko to cancel the decree on liquidation of the Kyiv District Administrative Court. So on 15 October Yushchenko liquidated the Kyiv District Administrative Court again. On 17 October The Kyiv Central Administrative Court has overturned the ruling of the Kyiv District Administrative Court. On 28 October The Kyiv Appeal Administrative Court cancelled the suspension of Yushchenko's election decision by the Kyiv District Administrative Court.

== End of crisis ==
On 22 October, President Yushchenko stated that the precise date for the early election could not be set until parliament (work in parliament was blocked by protests from 21 October till 24 October) approved finances for the poll and voted for legislation to help Ukraine through the 2008 financial crisis. So far parliament hasn't approved funding. On 12 November 2008 Yushchenko stated in an interview published in the Warsaw daily Rzeczpospolita that the election could no longer take place this year because anti-crisis actions had to be undertaken first.

Early December 2008 there were negotiations between Bloc Yulia Tymoshenko (BYuT) and Party of Regions to form a coalition but after Volodymyr Lytvyn was elected Chairman of the Verkhovna Rada (parliament of Ukraine) 9 December 2008 he announced the creation of a coalition between his Lytvyn Bloc, BYuT and Our Ukraine–People's Self-Defense Bloc (OU-PSD). After negotiations the three parties officially signed the coalition agreement on 16 December.

== See also ==
- 2007 Ukrainian political crisis
- 2007 Ukrainian parliamentary election
