= Second Tymoshenko government =

Government of Ukraine

Second Tymoshenko Government
- 13th Cabinet of Ukraine (since 1990)

- Date formed: 18 December 2007
- Date dissolved: 11 March 2010

People and organisations
- Head of state: Viktor Yushchenko
- Head of government: Yulia Tymoshenko
- Deputy head of government: Oleksandr Turchynov
- No. of ministers: 25
- Member party: Yulia Tymoshenko Bloc; NUNS; Lytvyn Bloc
- Status in legislature: Coalition of Democratic Forces (2007–2008); 228 / 450 (51%) Coalition of National Development, Stability and Order (2008–2010); 248 / 450 (55%)
- Opposition cabinet: Yanukovych shadow government
- Opposition party: Party of Regions; Communist Party of Ukraine; Lytvyn Bloc
- Opposition leader: Viktor Yanukovych; Petro Symonenko; Volodymyr Lytvyn

History
- Legislature term: 5 years
- Predecessor: Second Yanukovych government
- Successor: First Azarov government

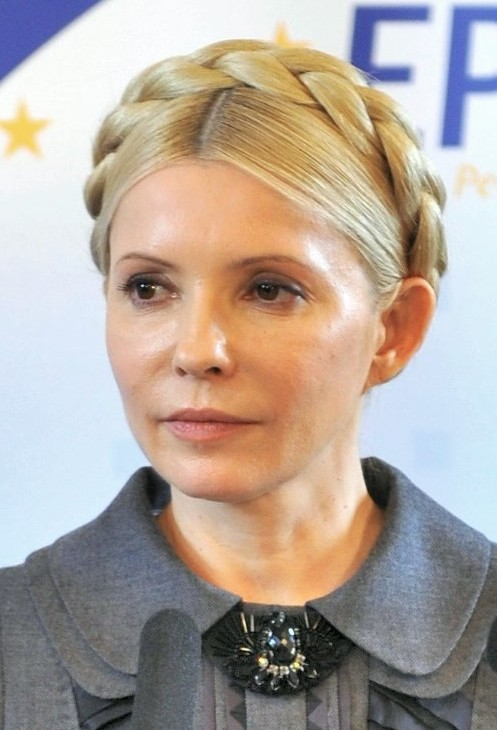

The second Tymoshenko Government was appointed on 18 December 2007 as a coalition between Bloc of Yulia Tymoshenko (BYuT) and Our Ukraine-People's Self-Defense Bloc (OU-PSD), OU-PSD is the party of then-President of Ukraine Viktor Yushchenko, following the 2007 Ukrainian parliamentary election. The government program was named: "Ukrainian breakthrough: for people, not for politicians".

On 17 December 2008 Prime Minister Yulia Tymoshenko announced a reshuffle of the cabinet after the forming of a BYuT, OU-PSD and Bloc of Lytvyn coalition following the 2008 Ukrainian political crisis. On March 3, 2010 the Ukrainian Parliament passed a motion of no confidence in the second Tymoshenko Government. A day before that the coalition had already lost the parliamentary majority. On March 11, 2010 the First Azarov Government was elected.

Since its dismissal several Ministers of the second Tymoshenko Government have been involved in criminal proceedings against them; the most noticeable outcomes of this were the imprisonments of former Prime Minister Tymoshenko and Interior Minister Yuriy Lutsenko.

== Creation ==
The appointment of the government of Ukraine was scheduled for the December 11, 2007. The session was opened late due to awaiting of the President of Ukraine who after arriving was giving the first word. At first there were 271 parliamentarians registered that morning with only Party of Regions and four people's deputies from the Communist Party being absent. During the voting for the appointment, however, the rest of the Communist Party and Lytvyn Bloc were absent together with Ivan Plyushch from Our Ukraine–People's Self-Defense Bloc. Beside that for some reason the electronic counting system of the parliament seemed to malfunction and did not count votes of two parliamentarians showing only 225 approving votes.

The creation of the new cabinet was rescheduled on December 18, but the political parties Party of Regions, Communist Party of Ukraine, and Lytvyn Bloc completely boycotted that session registering zero representatives from their parties. Only 227 people's deputies registered that day and there were five issues on agenda during that session: a) appointment of the Prime Minister of Ukraine, b) dismissal of the Prime Minister of Ukraine Viktor Yanukovych, c) dissolution of the current Cabinet of Ministers, d) formation of the new Cabinet of Ministers, e) an early termination of powers for parliamentarians elected to the Cabinet of Ministers of Ukraine. The voting on the first issue was decided to conduct without the parliamentary electronic counting system "Rada". The counting of votes started at 11 o'clock in the morning and was finished at 11:40 during the whole procedure it was found that one parliamentarian from Our Ukraine–People's Self-Defense Bloc was missing. At 12:30 the head of the counting commission Mykola Shershun announced the results.

Faction	Number of deputies	For	Against	Abstained	Didn't vote	Absent
Party of Regions Faction	172	0	0	0	0	172
Yulia Tymoshenko Bloc	156	156	0	0	0	0
Our Ukraine–People's Self-Defense Bloc	72	70	0	1	0	1
Communist Party of Ukraine Faction	27	0	0	0	0	27
Lytvyn Bloc	20	0	0	0	0	20
All factions	450	226	0	1	0	220

Before voting for his dismissal as the Prime Minister of Ukraine Viktor Yanukovych gave a speech (below is end of it):

...However, the same "orange ones", and I stress on it, carry the responsibility for ruing the stability in country, the stability that Ukraine received in 2006 after elections. Then we received the economy in ruins left by that same team. For the next year we managed to stabilize the economy and social-political situation, restore the best rates of economic growth in Europe, increase salaries and pensions. When into the opposition. We accepted that decision (noise in the session hall), and we emphasized on it. Very well that today there is onto whom put the responsibility, because the country in such condition could not work and live any longer - in the suspended state. And that laugh that now I hear from you it is unhealthy. Do not laugh at people's grief. (noise in the session hall)
Think about your responsibility which today you undertake. And remember that we will live on this land together and together we need to think how to live. That is the main issue. No need to seek how to disunite, but rather to unite. I am convinced that in it is the future of our country. And our position in relation to matters was always constructive, professional, and such will continue.
Thank you for attention.

— Viktor Yanukovych, Verbatim of 22nd parliamentary session (December 18, 2007)

The voting on the next issues was continued to be conducted without the utilization of the electronic counting system by showing hands. For the dismissal of Yanukovych all 226 parliamentarians registered in the session hall voted approvingly. The same results were obtained for the dismissal of the current Cabinet of Ministers. For the appointment of the new government 227 parliamentarians raised their hands that afternoon.

== Events ==
18 March 2009 the Cabinet of Ministers halved the salaries of the Prime Minister and all other ministers from 1 April 2009, to 1 January 2010 to fight the current economic crises of Ukraine.

On 18 June 2009 Parliament Speaker and leader of Bloc of Lytvyn Volodymyr Lytvyn stated that his party is not seeking posts in the Cabinet of Ministers even though at the time there were three posts vacant and the Transport and Communications Minister Yosyp Vinskyi turned in his resignation one day earlier. According to Lytvyn he had no intention of changing this position because he valued voters.

On 26 June 2009 Prime Minister Tymoshenko nominated Oleksandr Klymenko for coal minister, Mykhailo Zgurovsky and Yuriy Liubonenko for vice premiers, Fedir Yaroshenko for finance minister, Tariel Vasafze for transport and communications minister, and Viktor Shemchuk for justice minister.

On 16 November 2009 First Vice Prime Minister Oleksander Turchinov stated that the government's vacant ministerial posts could be filled only after the upcoming presidential elections.

== Fall ==
Newly elected President of Ukraine Viktor Yanukovych wanted to oust the current Cabinet and form a new Cabinet with his Party of Regions after his election on 7 February 2010. On February 20, 2010 Parliament Speaker Volodymyr Lytvyn stated he would announce the dissolution of the coalition the next plenary week if its activity by then was not confirmed in documents. On February 17 Lytvyn had asked the coalition to provide within ten days documents that confirmed its existence, in particular, a list of at least 226 Members of Parliament who are members. Lytvyn stated that it was possible to ensure "the effectiveness of the current coalition" or create a new coalition in parliament. Prime Minister Yulia Tymoshenko stated on February 22 she was holding negotiation "to unite in the Verkhovna Rada the democratic and pro-Ukrainian forces, all rational deputies of Our Ukraine–People's Self-Defense Bloc, the Lytvyn Bloc and Yulia Tymoshenko Bloc". If the current Cabinet could not be preserved Tymoshenko has stated she would go into Parliamentary opposition. During a Cabinet of Ministers meeting on February 24, 2010 Tymoshenko stated “I am certain that Our Ukraine group leaders ... will stand firmly in the defense of Ukraine and everything Ukrainian. I am certain that these leaders will not change their ideology or beliefs and join a majority coalition led by Party of Regions” (the Yulia Tymoshenko Bloc or Our Ukraine–People's Self-Defense Bloc faction where needed to form a new coalition). On February 24 Chairman of the Verkhovna Rada (Ukraine's parliament) Volodymyr Lytvyn received a document that had been drafted by the Party of Regions faction that had been submitted for examination by all factions, except the Yulia Tymoshenko Bloc, according to the Party of Regions the document was not the draft of a new coalition agreement but "a document submitted to the head of the Lytvyn Bloc faction in the process of talks so that he can consider this draft and we proposed that our colleagues consider this coalition agreement and make their amendments and remarks, if they deem it necessary".

On 2 March 2010 Chairman Lytvyn announced in parliament that the government had collapsed “In line with the constitution of Ukraine ... I announce that the coalition in parliament has ceased its activity". 37 (of the 55) Our Ukraine–People's Self-Defense Bloc faction members had voted for the continuation of the coalition. Ivan Kyrylenko, leader of the Yulia Tymoshenko Bloc faction, blamed the Lytvyn Bloc for the collapse of the coalition and according to Prime Minister Tymoshenko "The coalition was disbanded illegally", she also blamed the Lytvyn Bloc and "Our Ukraine, including the leader of Our Ukraine who announced the position of the faction".

On 1 March 2010 Prime Minister Tymoshenko demanded a vote of no confidence in the government in parliament. Ukraine's parliament held a vote of no confidence in the government on March 3, 2010, in which the cabinet was dismissed with 243 lawmakers voting in favour out of the 450. Before the vote and on March 3 Prime Minister Tymoshenko stated "If the dismissal of the government is passed today, at that very same moment our government will leave the cabinet. Our political force will cross into the opposition".

Until a new coalition was formed the government remained in place, as acting ministers; thus the ministers stayed on till March 11, 2010 when the First Azarov Government was elected.

== Achievements ==
According to Tymoshenko, the protection of Ukraine from financial and economic collapse amid the global crisis is the main achievement of the work of the government she had led. On 13 May 2010, Prime Minister Mykola Azarov claimed that ninety percent of decisions taken by the second Tymoshenko government had not been implemented in Ukraine.

On March 18, 2010, Accounting Chamber Head Valentyn Symonenko accused the second Tymoshenko government of falsifying budget indicators and noted a rise in the debt load on the budget in 2010 compared with 2009.

== Composition ==
Prime Minister Tymoshenko resigned from the post of Prime Minister on March 4, 2010. Oleksandr Turchynov was empowered to fulfill the Prime Minister's duties until a new government was formed on 4 March 2010, his reign lasted a week.

Party key	Fatherland
Party key	Our Ukraine
Party key	Reforms and Order
Party key	People's Movement of Ukraine
Party key	People's Self-Defense

Office	Incumbent	Party
Prime Minister	Yulia Tymoshenko	
First Vice Prime Minister	Oleksander Turchinov	
Vice Prime Minister (on issues of preparation to the UEFA Euro 2012)	Ivan Vasyunik	
Vice Prime Minister (on issues of European integration)	Hrihoriy Nemyrya	
Vice Prime Minister	vacant	
Minister of Education and Science	Ivan Vakarchuk	
Minister of Transport and Communications	Yosyp Vinskyi (till June 23, 2009)	
Minister of Culture and Tourism	Vasyl Vovkun	
Minister of Economics	Bohdan Danylyshyn	
Minister of Labor and Social Policy	Lyudmila Denysova	
Minister of Defense	Yuriy Yekhanurov (till June 5, 2009)	
Minister of Health Safety	Vasyl Knyazevych	
Minister of the Cabinet of Ministers	Petro Krupko	
Minister of Regional Development and Construction	Vasyl Kuybida	
Minister on Communal Living	Oleksiy Kucherenko	
Minister of Internal Affairs	Yuriy Lutsenko (till January 28, 2010)	
Minister of Agrarian Policy	Yuriy Melnyk	
Minister of Industrial Policy	Volodymyr Novytskyi	
Minister of Justice	Mykola Onishchuk	
Minister of Foreign Affairs	Volodymyr Ohryzko (till March 3, 2009); Petro Poroshenko (since October 9, 2009)	
Minister of Family, Youth and Sport	Yuriy Pavlenko	
Minister of Finance	Viktor Pynzenyk (till February 17, 2009)	
Minister of Coal Industry	Viktor Poltavets	
Minister of Fuel and Energy	Yuriy Prodan	
Minister of Environmental Protection	Hryhoriy Filipchuk; Deputy - Serhiy Rybalka (politician)	
Minister of Emergencies and Minister of the Protection of the Population from the Chornobyl disaster	Volodymyr Shandra	

=== Changes ===
- Minister of Transport and Communications Yosyp Vynskyi was dismissed by the Ukrainian parliament on June 23, 2009. Vynskyi has submitted his resignation statement on June 17, 2009 due to serious disagreements with Prime Minister Yulia Tymoshenko. Vynskyi stated: "The Prime Minister has been blocking reforms that are extremely important for the branch, as well as the allocation of funds required to build infrastructure facilities linked to Ukraine's hosting the Euro 2012 Football Championship". Tymoshenko said on ICTV television channel on June 15, 2009 that she did not rule out bringing a case against Vinsky (see accused him of attempts to misuse ₴15 million belonging to Ukrposhta for a presidential campaign of the minister). Vasyl Shevchenko, the first deputy minister, took over as acting head of the ministry.
- Yuriy Yehanurov was fired by the Ukrainian Parliament on June 5, 2009. Valeriy Ivaschenko, the first deputy minister, was appointed acting Defense Minister the same day.
- Yuriy Lutsenko was fired by the Ukrainian Parliament on January 28, 2010. The same day he was appointed by the Cabinet as first deputy Interior minister and acting Interior Minister. The Kyiv District Administrative Court suspended the government's decision until the end of an investigation into his appointment, but the Cabinet claimed it had not received any court ruling on the matter.
- On March 3, 2009 former minister Volodymyr Ohryzko was fired by the Ukrainian Parliament, Volodymyr Khandohiy was acting minister from March 3, 2009 till the appointment of Poroshenko since October 9, 2009.)
- Viktor Pynzenyk was (officially) dismissed on February 17, 2009. Ihor Umanskyi (acting since April 8, 2009)
- Viktor Poltavets asked to be dismissed due to the state of his health late June 2009, but recalled his letter of resignation on July 16, 2009; Poltavets stated he decided to resign "considering it would allow the parliamentary coalition to enhance the government thanks to the system of agreement with different political forces, however, the Verkhovna Rada of Ukraine has failed to consider the staff issues, but long absence of the head of the ministry may lead to complicated consequences".

== Criminal cases against former ministers ==
Late January 2011 the Control and Revision Office of Ukraine identified violations of law and the procedure for the use of public funds worth $12 billion in 2008–2009. Since April 2010 the General Prosecutor of Ukraine have launched several criminal case against former ministers in the Second Tymoshenko Government Early December 2010 Ukraine's Prosecutor General Viktor Pshonka had stated that there were no political reasons for the interrogations of the opposition leaders Tymoshenko, Lutsenko and Oleksandr Turchynov. But Tymoshenko has dismissed the probe against her as "terror against the opposition by President Yanukovych".

=== Yulia Tymoshenko and Yuriy Lutsenko ===
Former Prime Minister Yulia Tymoshenko and Interior Minister Yuriy Lutsenko have been jailed since October 2011 and February 2012. On 7 April 2013 a decree by President Viktor Yanukovych freed Lutsenko from prison and exempted him, and his fellow Minister in the second Tymoshenko Government Heorhiy Filipchuk, from further punishment.

=== Valeriy Ivaschenko ===
Former acting Acting Ukrainian Defense Minister Valeriy Ivaschenko was arrested on 25 August 2010 for illegally making a decision to sell Government property. In 2013 Ivashchenko claimed he was prosecuted because he refused to testify against Tymoshenko and Oleksandr Turchynov and that the accusations against him where fabricated by his former deputy minister of defence, Ihor Montrezor, who he had fired because he was “fixing dirty corrupt deals in the upper echelons of power”. Ivaschenko was sentenced to 5 years imprisonment for abuse of power on 12 April 2012. The United States Embassy in Kyiv named Ivaschenko's verdict a "latest example of selective justice in Ukraine" and it called for his release. On 14 August 2012 a Court of Appeals replaced the five-year imprisonment for Ivaschenko with a suspended sentence with a one-year probation period. On 13 February 2013 Ivaschenko was granted political asylum in Denmark. On 12 March 2013 the Higher Specialized Court of Ukraine for Criminal and Administrative Cases upheld his suspended five-year sentence.

=== Heorhiy Filipchuk ===
Environment minister in the second Tymoshenko Government, Heorhiy Filipchuk, was detained and charged with abuse of office early December 2010, Filipchuk was sentenced to 3 years imprisonment for abuse of power on 5 April 2012. Members of the German Bundestag (parliament) criticized this verdict. In June 2012, Kyiv's Court of Appeals changed the verdict against Filipchuk, giving him a two-year suspended sentence. President Viktor Yanukovych on 5 April 2013 proposed the presidential commission on pardons urgently to consider the request by Verkhovna Rada Human Rights Commissioner Valeriya Lutkovska to pardon Filipchuk. Filipchuk had asked President Yanukovych for a pardon on 5 April 2013. On 7 April 2013 a decree by Yanukovych granted this request (among others) for health reasons.

=== Bohdan Danylyshyn ===
Former economy minister Bohdan Danylyshyn was detained in the Czech Republic in October 2010 on abuse of office charges. Danylyshyn was granted political asylum by the Czech Republic in January 2011.

=== Yevhen Korniychuk ===
Former First Deputy Justice Minister Yevgen Korniychuk was detained on 22 December 2010 but was excluded from criminal proceedings on 9 December 2011 (On 15 February 2010 the investigator had changed the pre-trial restrictions from arrest to a written undertaking not to leave Kyiv).

=== Mykhailo Pozhyvanov ===
Former a deputy minister of economy Mykhailo Pozhyvanov was put on a wanted list by the Prosecutor General on 31 January 2011; since then he lives in Austria.
