= Roman Bezsmertnyi =

Ukrainian politician

- Роман Безсмертний
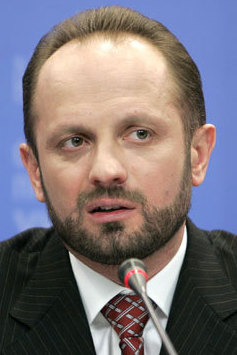
- Bezsmertnyi in 2011

Ambassador to Belarus
- In office 24 February 2010 – 1 June 2011
- Preceded by: Ihor Likhovy
- Succeeded by: Viktor Tikhonov

Deputy Prime Minister for Administrative Reform
- In office 4 February 2005 – 8 September 2005
- President: Viktor Yushchenko
- Prime Minister: Yulia Tymoshenko

People's Deputy of Ukraine
- In office 27 March 1994 – 15 June 2007

Personal details
- Born: 15 November 1965 (age 60) Motyzhyn, Makariv Raion, Ukrainian SSR, Soviet Union (now Ukraine)
- Party: Third Ukrainian Republic
- Other political affiliations: Ukrainian Republican Party; Our Ukraine; Our Ukraine–People's Self-Defense Bloc
- Education: Taras Shevchenko National University of Kyiv

Roman Petrovych Bezsmertnyi (Ukrainian: Роман Петрович Безсмертний; born 15 November 1965) is a Ukrainian politician who served as a People's Deputy of Ukraine for four terms between 1994 and 2007. He also served as deputy head of the secretariat of the Ukrainian president and as ambassador of Ukraine to Belarus. Bezsmertnyi is also (in 2005) a former Deputy Prime Minister of Ukraine, responsible for administrative and territorial reform.

== Political career ==
After graduating Kyiv University, Bezsmertnyi became a school history teacher in Makariv. Soon after Ukraine gained independence, he switched to politics and made a successful career within the Ukrainian Republican Party, becoming its member of parliament in 1994. Later he left the party but continued his career as a member of parliament. From 2002 to 2006 he was a member of the parliamentary Committee for State Development and Local Self-Governance.

Bezsmertnyi was one of the leaders of the 2004 Orange Revolution. After Viktor Yuschenko's victory on the 2004 presidential elections, Bezsmertnyi became the main organizer of the People's Union "Our Ukraine" party. The "Our Ukraine"s formal chair is Yuschenko himself, so Bezsmertnyi, as the Head of party's Political Council, became its factual leader.

In 2005 Bezsmertnyi was Deputy Prime Minister of Ukraine, responsible for administrative and territorial reform, in the first Tymoshenko government.

On 19 February 2008, Bezsmertny resigned from the "Our Ukraine" party. In a joint statement (with people's deputies, Mykhaylo Polyanchych, Ihor Kril, Viktor Topolov, Oksana Bilozir and Vasyl Petiovka) Bezsmertny declared that: "some of the leaders of the party play their own game, coming from personal interests and it has nothing to do with responsibility, pluralism, and norms of democracy."

In mid-April 2009, Bezsmertnyi rejoined the People's Union "Our Ukraine", stating: "To be acting head of the executive committee and not to be a member of the party is not right in relation to the people I am working with".

From 24 February 2010 to 3 June 2011 Bezsmertnyi was Ambassador of Ukraine to Belarus.

In July 2014, Bezsmertnyi became the party leader of Third Ukrainian Republic.

Bezsmertnyi was Ukraine's representative to the political subgroup of the Trilateral Contact Group on Ukraine of the Russo-Ukrainian War until May 2016.

From March 2016 until January 2018 Bezsmertnyi was one of the party leaders of the Agrarian Party of Ukraine.

Bezsmertnyi declared his candidacy in the 2019 Ukrainian presidential election on 31 May 2018. He did not proceed to the second round of the election; in the first round, he gained 0.14% of the votes.

In December 2018 Bezsmertnyi announced the creation of a new party late January 2019.

President Volodymyr Zelenskyy has authorised Bezsmertnyi to represent Ukraine in the working political subgroup at the Trilateral Contact Group on a Donbas settlement. On 13 August 2019 Bezsmertnyi was dismissed from his post at the Trilateral Contact Group by a decree of President Zelenskyy.

== See also ==
- Politics of Ukraine
- Cabinet of Ministers of Ukraine
