= Artur Herasymov =

Ukrainian politician

- Артур Герасимов
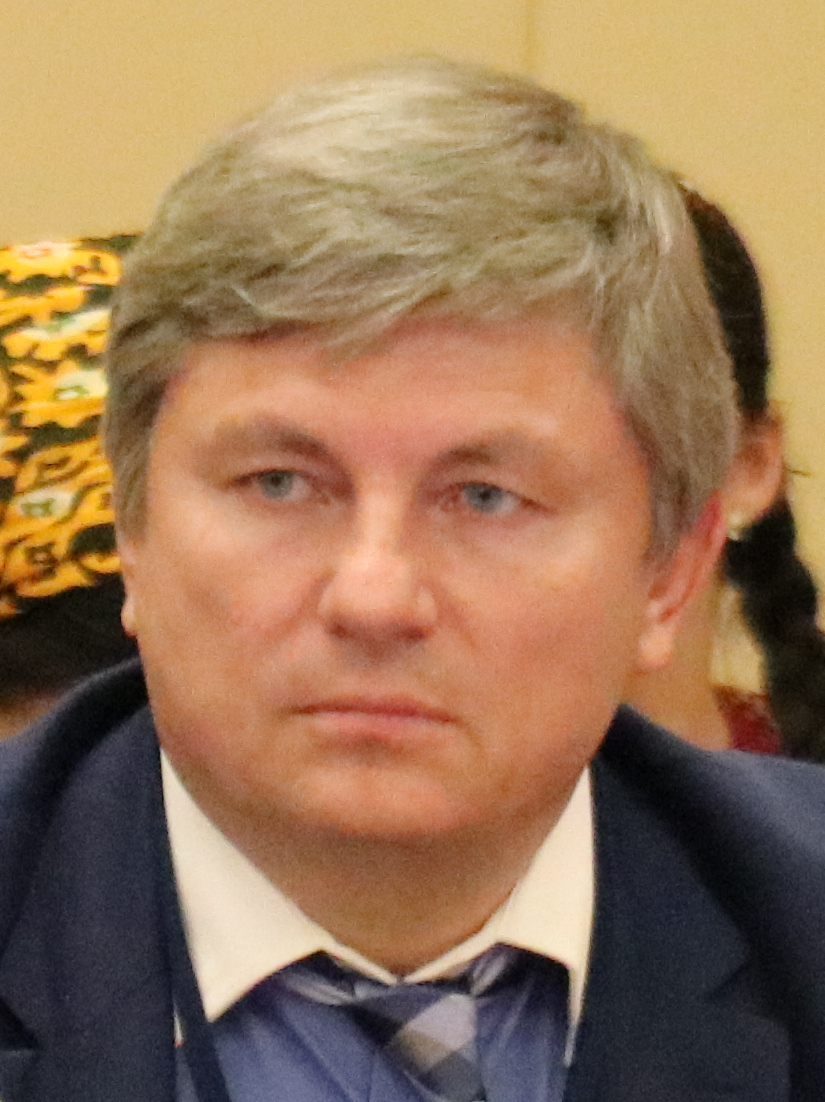
- Herasymov in 2024

Member of the Verkhovna Rada
- Incumbent
- Assumed office 27 November 2014

Representative of the President of Ukraine in the Verkhovna Rada
- In office 30 May 2016 – 3 April 2017
- Succeeded by: Iryna Lutsenko

Personal details
- Born: Artur Volodymyrovych Herasymov; 23 August 1972 (age 54) Reshetylivka, Ukraine, Soviet Union
- Party: European Solidarity

Artur Volodymyrovych Herasymov (Ukrainian: Артур Володимирович Герасимов; born on 23 August 1972) is a Ukrainian politician who is a member of the Verkhovna Rada since 27 November 2014. He was the leader of the then-Petro Poroshenko Bloc parliamentary faction from 2017 to 2019. Herasymov is currently the co-chairman of the European Solidarity faction in the Verkhovna Rada of the 9th convocation since 2019.

He had the diplomatic rank of Ambassador of Ukraine to the OSCE. He was deprived of the role by decree of President Volodymyr Zelenskyy on 11 September 2019.

== Biography ==
Artur Herasymov was born in Reshetylivka on 23 August 1972.

From 1991 to 1995, he studied and graduated from the Taras Shevchenko National University of Kyiv, Faculty of Psychology and Sociology.

Between 1994 and 1997, he was the deputy director of the "Ukrainian Marketing Group".

In 1996, he became a member of the governing bodies of the Ukrainian Marketing Association.

From 1995 to 1997, he was a postgraduate student at the Faculty of Sociology and Psychology of the Kyiv National University.

== Career ==
Between 1997 and 1999, he got promoted to the director of the "Ukrainian Marketing Group".

In 1998, he was part of the ESOMAR (European Association of Market and Public Opinion Researchers).

In 1999, he got promoted to the general director of the company.

In 2003, he was part of the American Marketing Association.

In 2012 unsuccessfully took part in the parliamentary elections as an independent candidate in the constituency No.51 situated in Horlivka in Donetsk Oblast. He was part of an unofficial association known as "Team Serhii Shakhov."

In the 2014 Ukrainian parliamentary election Herasymov was elected to the Verkhovna Rada (Ukraine's national parliament) as a member of Petro Poroshenko Bloc as number 43 on its election list.

On 30 May 2016, Herasymov became the Representative of the President of Ukraine in the Verkhovna Rada.

In 2016, he was elected deputy chairman of the Committee on Economic Issues, Science, Technology and the Environment of the OSCE Parliamentary Assembly and joined the Assembly's governing bodies. He was re-elected unanimously to that position in 2017, 2018, 2019, 2021 and 2022.

He was the chairman of the Permanent Delegation of the Verkhovna Rada to the OSCE Parliamentary Assembly, the chairman of the Subcommittee on the Defense Industry Complex and Military-Technical Cooperation of the Verkhovna Rada Committee on National Security and Defense, the Head of the group for inter-parliamentary relations with Chile, and also the deputy head of the group for inter-parliamentary relations with Poland.

On 3 April 2017, the Petro Poroshenko Bloc faction in the Verkhovna Rada elected Herasymov as chairman of the party faction. He was subsequently replaced by Iryna Lutsenko as the Representative of the President of Ukraine in the Verkhovna Rada on the same day.

On 1 November 2018, Russian sanctions were imposed against 322 citizens of Ukraine, including Herasymov.

In the 2019 parliamentary elections, he was number 11 on the "European Solidarity" party list.

On 29 August 2019, the European Solidarity faction in the Verkhovna Rada elected Herasymov as co-chairman of the faction.

Ukrainian mass media wrote about Herasymov's connection with pro-Russian terrorist Igor Bezler, one of the leaders of the Donetsk People's Republic. According to the journalistic investigation of the online publication "Ukrainska Pravda", during the 2012 election campaign, Bezler (at that time, a retired military officer and the executor of the ritual service of the local KP "Prostir") was personally responsible for the security of Herasymov in Horlivka.

=== Scandal regarding the assignment and cancellation of diplomatic rank ===
On 18 May 2019, the President of Ukraine, Petro Poroshenko, at the request of the Ministry of Foreign Affairs, awarded Herasymov the rank of Ambassador Extraordinary and Plenipotentiary of Ukraine to the OSCE.

The awarding of the highest diplomatic rank to politicians from the presidential coalition (especially Herasymov) caused criticism from the diplomatic corps. Career diplomats, particularly from Ambassador of Ukraine to Italy, Yevhen Perelyhin, stated that "assigning high-level diplomatic ranks to people who are not members of the diplomatic corps is unprofessional and offensive from a moral point of view." There were also doubts about the legality of the decision, as the decision regarding the assignment of the role was appealed in the District Administrative Court of Kyiv.

On 11 September 2019, President Volodymyr Zelenskyy, stripped Herasymov's diplomatic role, citing the decree former President Poroshenko had signed was declared "issued unreasonably".

In February 2020, Herasymov sued President Zelenskyy, demanding that his decree would be illegal and won the court case.

=== Support for Colonel Roman Chervinsky in court ===
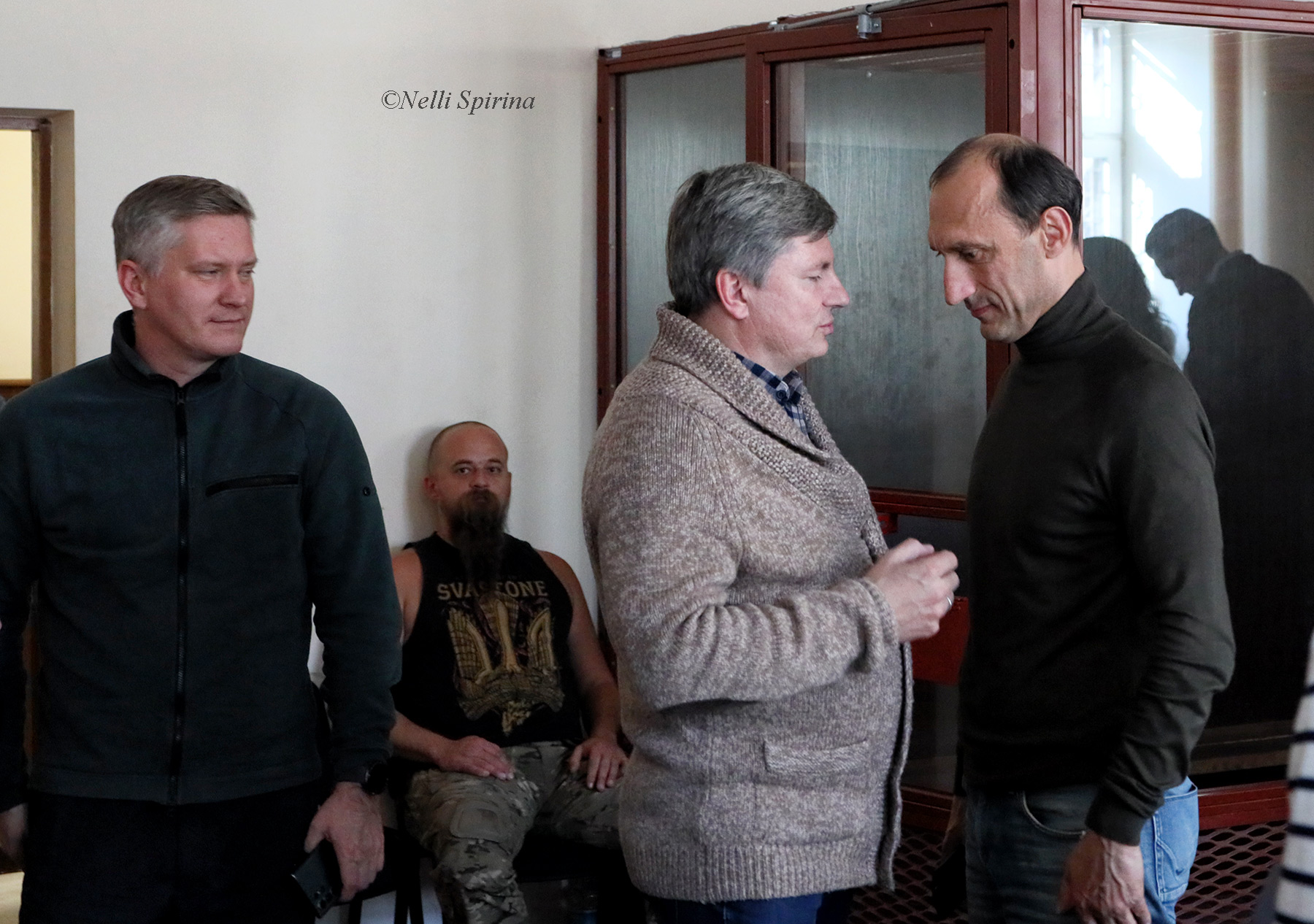
Artur Gerasimov and Roman Chervinsky in the Pechersk District Court of Kyiv. November 7, 2024

July 18, 2024 Gerasimov, together with Petro Poroshenko and all MPs from the European Solidarity parliamentary faction, filed a petition to take Colonel Chervinsky on bail. The court ignored the bail application.

== Personal life ==
=== Family ===
He is married to Nataliya Bukhalova, and has five children: Kateryna, Mariya, Oleksandr, Georgiy, and Danyla.

=== Financial status and wealth ===
According to the declaration for 2020, Herasymov only received income from receiving a deputy's salary (482,507 hryvnias), he has no money in his accounts, but he has more than a million hryvnias, 69 thousand dollars and 17 thousand euros in cash.

According to the declaration, Herasymov also has no real estate, he uses a 2018 Range Rover car free of charge. As to valuables, he has Breguet and IWC wristwatches. His family members have no cash or money in banks. Nataliya owns the corporate rights of Comcon-Ukraine LLC, Comcon Pharma-Ukraine LLC, Bukhalova Consulting, Ukrainian Marketing Group, and UMG International. She owns two apartments in Kyiv, three garages and a 2011 BMW X5 car.

==== Scandal regarding an undeclared villa in Spain ====
In April 2021, journalists of the "Schemes" program of the Ukrainian edition of Radio Liberty found out that in his property declaration for 2020, Herasymov did not indicate that he owned a villa in Spain with an area of 120 square meters. Journalistic investigation revealed that Herasymov became the owner of this property together with his wife back in 2013, however, after becoming a member of parliament, he never entered information about it in the declaration.

After the investigation was released, he reported that he had informed the National Agency for the Prevention of Corruption "about possible inaccuracies in the declaration.". The agency has opened criminal proceedings based on this fact.

On 31 December 2021, the National Agency for the Prevention of Corruption found that Herasymov had provided false information in the declaration in the amount of 1.2 million hryvnias, thereby confirming"Scheme"'s data to the investigation. In the agency's explanations, Herasymov said that this foreign property does not belong to him, as he gave it to his mother, but the agency established that he signed the property gift agreement on 14 November 2013, almost two months after its purchase on 16 September 2013.

On February 7, 2023, representatives of the NABU and the SAP presented Artur Gerasimov with a release act in the case of undeclared real estate in Spain. But later the Appeals Chamber of the High Anti-Corruption Court overturned the conviction and closed the criminal proceedings.
