= Third Ukrainian Republic (party) =

Third Ukrainian Republic Третя Українська Республіка
- Leader: Roman Bezsmertnyi.
- Founded: February 6, 1999
- Headquarters: 10a Lesya Ukrainka Boulevard in Kyiv
- Political position: Centre-left
- Colours: Red

Website
- http://www.3republic.org.ua

Third Ukrainian Republic (Ukrainian: Третя Українська Республіка, romanized: Tretia Ukrainska Respublika) is a political party in Ukraine. The party was formally named (from its creation in May 1999 till April 2010) Forward, Ukraine! (Ukrainian: Вперед, Україно!; Vpered, Ukrajino!) and (from April 2010 till July 2014) People's Self-Defense Political Party (Ukrainian: Політична партія Народна Самооборона, romanized: Politychna partiia Narodna Samooborona).

In December 2011 the party announced it would be merged into All-Ukrainian Union "Fatherland". However, in July 2014 the party was re-energised and renamed.

== History ==
=== Forward, Ukraine! electoral bloc ===
Originally, the party takes its roots from the electoral bloc "Forward, Ukraine!" that was formed on April 3, 1997. Composed out of several political formations such as the parliamentary faction "Reforms", the Christian-Democratic Party of Ukraine (leader V.Stretovych), the Christian Democratic Union, the Ukrainian Christian Democratic Party, Hromada (led by Oleksandr Turchynov), Christian Democratic Youth of Ukraine, the trade union "Our Right", the charity fund "Ukrainian Perspective", Ukrainian fund in support of reforms, and the political association "Young Ukraine". The leading section of that bloc was the parliamentary faction "Reforms" led by Serhiy Sobolyev. In June 1997 the faction changed its name to "Forward, Ukraine!" as well whose unofficial leader became the deputy speaker Viktor Musiyaka.

Right before the 1998 Ukrainian parliamentary elections however the bloc fell apart, out which was created the Reforms and Order Party of Viktor Pynzenyk. The rest of the bloc consisting of the Christian Democratic Union, the Ukrainian Christian Democratic Party and the Young Ukraine went to the elections under its original name and led by the former deputy speaker of the Ukrainian parliament (Verkhovna Rada) Viktor Musiyaka. The bloc "Forward, Ukraine!" proved to be an unsuccessful political project gathering only 1.73% at the elections and receiving no representation. Next year Viktor Musiyaka transformed the bloc into a party with the same name. In 2012 another party with the same name Ukraine - Forward! led by Natalia Korolevska copied the statute of the "Forward, Ukraine!" and also failed to place any representation in parliament in 2012.

=== Forward, Ukraine! ===
Forward Ukraine party logo

As a political party "Forward, Ukraine!" was registered by the Justice Ministry on May 13, 1999.

At the 2002 elections, the party was part of the Viktor Yushchenko Bloc Our Ukraine. "Forward, Ukraine!" in parliament was represented only by its leader Viktor Musiyaka.

At the 2006 elections it decided to participate alone gathering only 6,934 votes (0.02%).

At the 2007 elections, the party joined Viktor's Yushchenko Bloc once more within the Yuriy Lutsenko's People's Self-Defense. Being part of the Our Ukraine alliance the party received 6 out of 72 parliamentary seats that were won by the alliance. Parliamentary mandates were received by Oleh Novikov, Kateryna Lukianova, Kyrylo Kulykov, Serhiy Kharovsky, Yuriy Hrymchak, and Serhiy Lutsenko.

In an interview with the Silski Visti (Village News) newspaper on 29 January 2009 interior minister Yuriy Lutsenko declared that Civil Movement "People's Self-Defense" as an insurgent, protesting, and not very structured civil movement has ceased to exist". Lutsenko also said he was planning to direct the organisational changes of Forward, Ukraine!.

The party supported Yulia Tymoshenko as presidential candidate in the 2010 Ukrainian presidential election. The party did not support the dismissal of the second Tymoshenko Government.

=== People's Self-Defense Political Party ===
At the ninth congress of the Forward, Ukraine! Party on February 26, 2010 the decision was taken to rename the party. Justice Minister Oleksandr Lavrynovych signed a relevant decree April 20, 2010.

On August 4, 2010 party leader Yuriy Lutsenko declared that the party would participate in the 2010 local elections in collaboration with All-Ukrainian Union "Fatherland" on joined lists. But eventually the party did independently participate in the election. Now with much success, the party won no representatives in Oblast Councils (regional parliaments); its biggest success was winning seats in the city council of several towns in the Lviv Oblast.

The party announced it will be merged into All-Ukrainian Union "Fatherland" in December 2011. This process started late December 2011. As of mid-April 2013 there have been no reports about the party holding a congress to pass a decision on this merge. And the party was still registered at the Ukrainian Ministry of Justice.

The party competed on one single party under "umbrella" party "Fatherland", together with several other parties, during the 2012 parliamentary elections During the election this list won 62 seats (25.55% of the votes) under the proportional party-list system and another 39 by winning 39 simple-majority constituencies; a total of 101 seats in Parliament.

=== Third Ukrainian Republic ===
On 1 July 2014 the party was officially renamed "Third Ukrainian Republic". New party leader Roman Bezsmertnyi (that day) stated to materialise the "ideas of Yuriy Lutsenko" by active citizens who had rallied around Lutsenko". Instead, he also said that Lutsenko was not a member of the party; but he would head the party if Lutsenko would not join the party Solidarity. According to Bezsmertnyi Ukrainian President Petro Poroshenko was at the time negotiating with Lutsenko to make him party leader of Solidarity. Bezsmertnyi assured that if Lutsenko would become party leader of Solidarity he and his fellow and Third Ukrainian Republic members would "think whether to go to the polls without our leader". On 27 August 2014 Lutsenko was elected party leader of Solidarity (that party was renamed Bloc of Petro Poroshenko the same day).

The party did not participate in the 2014 Ukrainian parliamentary election.

== Elections history ==
Year	Popular vote	Percentage	Overall seats	Change	Government	Remarks
2002	Our Ukraine		1 / 450	▲1	Opposition	as Forward, Ukraine!
2006	6,934	0.02	0 / 450	▼1		as Forward, Ukraine!
2007	Our Ukraine–People's Self-Defense Bloc		6 / 450	▲6	Government	as Forward, Ukraine!
2012	United Opposition				Opposition	as People's Self-Defense Party
2014	Did not participate					

Date	Party leader	Remarks
1999–2001	Viktor Musiyaka	
2001	Volodymyr Sivkovych	
2001–2007	Viktor Musiyaka	
2007–2011	Yuriy Lutsenko	
2007–present	Roman Bezsmertnyi	

== See also ==
- Civil movement "For Ukraine"
- Yuriy Lutsenko's People's Self-Defense
