= Viktor Musiyaka =

Ukrainian politician and lawyer (1946–2019)

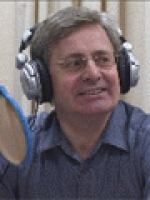
Viktor Musiyaka

Viktor Musiyaka (Ukrainian: Віктор Лаврентійович Мусіяка; 28 June 1946 – 22 July 2019) was a Ukrainian politician, leader of the party "Forward, Ukraine!", and deputy chairman of the Ukrainian parliament.

== Early life ==
Musiyaka was born soon after World War II on 28 June 1946 in a small village between Mykolaiv and Ochakiv called Bezvodne, which waas then part of the Ukrainian SSR in the Soviet Union. His father, Lavrentii Antonovych, was a peasant who served as a kolkhoz chairman, and his mother, Anastasiia Serhiivna, was a kolkhoz worker. Soon after graduating high school, he worked on factories, first at the Shipyard named after 61 Communards and then after returning from the army at the Olshansky Cement Factory near the town of Olshanske. In 1973 Musiyaka graduated the Kharkiv Law University and its aspirantura, after which he was teaching at the university. Occasionally Musiyaka headed several departments at the university and in 1992 he was granted the title of professor.

Afterwards, while serving in politics, from 1998 to 1999 he was chief scientific consultant to the Secretariat of the Verkhovna Rada, and for a year afterward deputy director for research at the Institute of Legislation of the Verkhovna Rada. From 2000 to 2002 he served as a part-time professor and head of the Department of Sectoral Legal Sciences at the National University of Kyiv-Mohyla Academy while simultaneously being Director of the Center for Commercial Law.

== Political career ==
From 1994 to 2006 Musiyaka was active in politics of Ukraine and twice was elected to the Ukrainian parliament where for sometime he served as a deputy chairman of the Verkhovna Rada. V. Musiyaka was the Chairman of the Subcommittee on Legislative Support of Political Reform, Parliamentary Reform and Organization of Parliamentary Control of the Verkhovna Rada Committee on Legal Policy.
