= Iryna Lutsenko =

Ukrainian politician

- Ірина Луценко
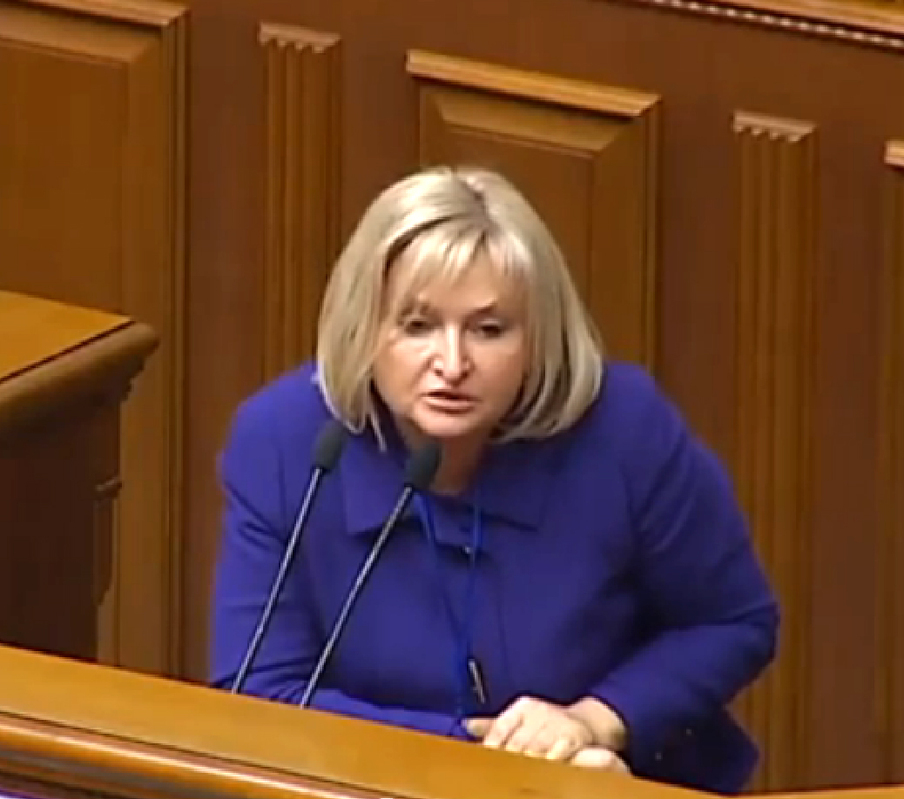

People's Deputy of Ukraine
- In office 27 January 2015 – 12 November 2019
- Constituency: Petro Poroshenko Bloc, No. 70 (2015-2019) "European Solidarity" party, No. 15 (2019)
- In office 12 December 2012 – 28 October 2014
- Constituency: Batkivshchyna, No. 18

Representative of the President of Ukraine in the Verkhovna Rada
- In office 3 April 2017 – 17 May 2019
- Preceded by: Artur Herasymov
- Succeeded by: Ruslan Stefanchuk

Personal details
- Born: Iryna Stepanivna Lutsenko; 7 February 1966 (age 60) Dubno, Ukraine, Soviet Union
- Party: European Solidarity
- Spouse: Yuriy Lutsenko

Iryna Stepanivna Lutsenko (Ukrainian: Ірина Степанівна Луценко; born on 7 February 1966) is a Ukrainian politician, who served as a Member of the Verkhovna Rada from 2012 to 2019.

She was also the Representative of the President of Ukraine in the Verkhovna Rada from 2017 to 2019.

== Early life and education ==
Iryna Lustenko was born on 7 February 1966 in Dubno, Rivne Oblast.

In 1988, she graduated from the Lviv Polytechnic Institute with a degree in Applied Mathematics.

== Career ==
From 1988 to 1991, she was a software engineer for the automated control system of the Special Design Bureau of the All-Union National Non-Profit Organization Soyuzuchpribor.

From 1991 to 1994, she was a leading specialist in the Economics Department of the Rivne Regional Executive Committee.

Between 1994 and 1998, she had been the Deputy Head of the Department of the Rivne Territorial Administration of the Antimonopoly Committee of Ukraine.

In 1996, she graduated from the Ukrainian State Academy of Water Management, a special faculty with a degree in Accounting and Audit. From 1998 to 2004, she was the head of the department of the Kyiv Regional Territorial Branch of the Antimonopoly Committee of Ukraine.

From 2004 to 2005, she was the head of the department at the Head Office of NJSIC "Oranta". From 2005 to 2008, she was Financial Director of Ukrainian Newest Telecommunications LLC.

From 2008 to 2012, she was the director of Lotos Business Center LLC.

From 2008 to 2009, she was the part-time administrative director of Ukrainian Newest Telecommunications LLC and from 2009 to 2012, part-time commercial director of the same company.

=== Member of the Verkhovna Rada ===
Before the parliamentary elections in 2012, Lutsenko was entered on the 18th place on the national list associating opposition circles centered around Batkivshchyna party. Her husband Yuriy, was in prison at the time and was not allowed to stand as a candidate.

On 12 December 2012, Lutsenko became a member of the Verkhovna Rada of the VII convocation from the All-Ukrainian Association "Batkivshchyna", No. 18 on the list. At the time, she was the Deputy Chairman of the committee, Chairman of the Subcommittee on Gender Equality of the Verkhovna Rada Committee on Human Rights, National Minorities and Interethnic Relations.

In the October 2014 Ukrainian parliamentary election, Lutsenko tried to get reelected into parliament this time by placing 70th on the electoral list of Petro Poroshenko Bloc. She was not however re-elected as the Petro Poroshenko Bloc gained only 63 seats by electoral list.

After fellow Petro Poroshenko Bloc members left the Verkhovna Rada, she returned as a People's Deputy on 27 January 2015. She was the head of the Subcommittee on International Legal Issues and Parliamentary Control of Ukraine's Fulfillment of International Obligations of the Verkovna Rada Committee on Foreign Affairs.

On 3 April 2017, Lustenko was appointed Representative of the President of Ukraine in the Verkhovna Rada.

On 21 May 2019, she was replaced by Ruslan Stefanchuk.

On 29 August 2019, she was reelected to the parliament, from the "European Solidarity" party, No. 15 on the list. She was a member of the Verkhovna Rada Committee on Environmental Policy and Nature Management.

On November 4, she announced the resignation of her parliamentary powers for health reasons. Her mandate was officially terminated on 12 November 2019.

== Controversies ==
On 17 September 2014, Lutsenko was chased out of the event by the participants of the rally under the building of the Administration of the President of Ukraine with calls of "Shame".

On December 9, 2015, as a deputy of the Petro Poroshenko Bloc faction, she repeatedly voted for herself and 3 other deputies. This case became the largest case of "piano voting" in the Verkhovna Rada in 2015.

On 5 October 2017, in the hall of the Verkhova Rada, the remark "Oleh, take away the goat, take away the goat!", addressed to the People's Deputy from the Petro Poroshenko Bloc, Oleh Nedaviaba, a native of Yenakievo, neutralized the deputy Yuriy Levchenko (member of the "Svoboda"), who opposed the presidential bill No. 7164 "On the creation of necessary conditions for the peaceful settlement of the situation in certain areas of Donetsk and Luhansk regions", which established the term of validity of the Law of Ukraine "On the creation of necessary conditions for the peaceful settlement of the situation in certain areas of the Donetsk and Luhansk regions" — 1 year from the date of entry into force.

On 7 February 2019, during the discussion of the issue of renaming the Dnipropetrovsk Oblast, Verkhovna Rada Speaker Andriy Parubiy invited her to the podium. Lutsenko came out and began to report on observers from Russia and the possible preparation of interference in the elections of the president and people's deputies. Parubiy interrupted Lutsenko and drew her attention to the fact that she mixed up the reports. Because of this, she cursed with the expletive line "Blyakha-mukha".

== Family ==
Her husband, Yuriy, whom she met while studying at the Lviv Polytechnic Institute had been a Prosecutor General of Ukraine, serving from 2016 to 2019.

The Lutsenko family has two sons, Olkesnadr (born in 1989), and Vitaliy (born in 1999).

Iryna's father, Stepan Narembik, was the head of Dubnovantajavtotrans OJSC until 2007. In 2008, for some time he was the owner of Lotus Business Center LLC, and from 2009 to 2010, he was the of Ukrainian New Telecommunications LLC (later she became the owner of both daughter Iryna).

Her mother, Stefaniya, taught English in a secondary school.
