= Mykola Martynenko =

Ukrainian politician

- Микола Мартиненко
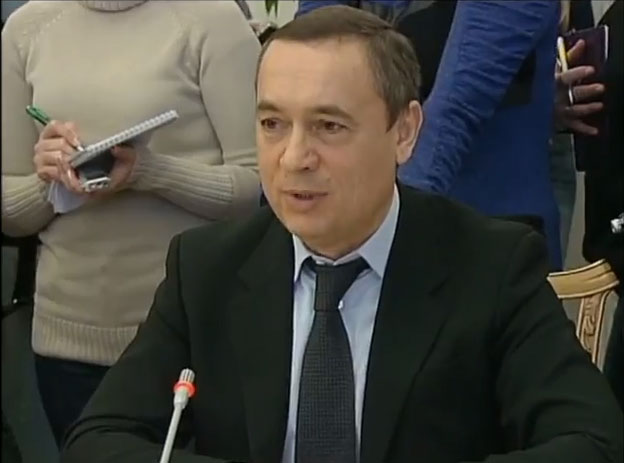
- Martynenko in 2012

People's Deputy of Ukraine
- In office 12 May 1998 – 23 December 2015
- Preceded by: Constituency established (1998)
- Succeeded by: Constituency abolished (2006)
- Constituency: Volyn Oblast, No. 21 (1998–2006); NUNS, No. 21 (2006–2007); NUNS, No. 48 (2007–2012); Batkivshchyna, No. 17 (2012–2015)

Personal details
- Born: 12 January 1961 (age 65) Svitlovodsk, Ukrainian SSR, Soviet Union (now Ukraine)
- Party: People's Front
- Other political affiliations: Our Ukraine–People's Self-Defense Bloc; Batkivshchyna

Mykola Volodymyrovych Martynenko (Ukrainian: Микола Володимирович Мартиненко; born 12 January 1961) is a Ukrainian politician who served as a People's Deputy of Ukraine from 1998 to 2015, as a member of the People's Front. From 2009 until 2011 he headed the parliamentary faction of the Our Ukraine-People's Self-Defense Bloc.

On 26 June 2020, a court in Switzerland found Martynenko guilty of money laundering, and sentenced him to 28 months in prison.

== Involvement in embezzlement in Ukraine, Switzerland and Czech Republic ==
In December 2015 Martynenko resigned from the Verkhovna Rada (Ukraine's parliament) amid a corruption scandal.

He became the first People's Deputy in the history of Ukraine who voluntarily refused the parliamentary mandate to show that he was not afraid of investigations against himself.

Ukrainian, Swiss and Czech authorities suspect Martynenko of organizing large-scale embezzlement.

On 8 October 2015 Martynenko said that the case against him was instituted without any grounds on the order of the pro-Russian energy lobby and oligarchs because while heading the parliamentary committee on fuel and energy he had defended the diversification of supplies of Russian gas and nuclear fuel, and the progressive law on the gas market adopted with the assistance of M. Martynenko did not allow billions of illegal super profits to be earned by the oligarchs

On 17 January 2017 the court ordered NABU to close the so-called "Martynenko case" within 10 days but in the opinion of the former MP NABU took an unprecedented step - deciding to illegally appeal against the court's decision which is based on the practice of the European Court of Human Rights, so it is final and can not be appealed.

On 30 March 2017 Martynenko appealed to the National Anti-Corruption Bureau, the Verkhovna Rada, the President and ambassadors of the G-7 and the European Union in Ukraine on "political persecution, gross violations of the law and presumption of innocence". Martynenko reminded that in 2015 he voluntarily retired as the people's deputy of Ukraine and refused the parliamentary immunity. "During 15 months, the detectives of NABU found out: there is no evidence of my illegal activities. However, Artem Sytnyk and Gizo Uglava do not leave their intentions to falsify the charges against me. Unfortunately, the leaders of NABU are guided not by law but by political motives, aspirations for their own PR and personal revenge."

On 19 December 2019 the case in Switzerland, in which Martynenko appears, was transferred to a Swiss court. Martynenko's defense said this had happened under pressure and at the insistence of lawyers, publishing a copy of the appeal to the Federal Criminal Court of the Swiss Confederation. Martynenko's press service explained the procrastination of the Swiss prosecutor by the fact that there was no evidence in the case, so Köli "wanted to transfer the burden of proof in court to the Ukrainian SAP, NABU and the Ukrainian court." On 26 June 2020 a Swiss court of first instance sentenced him to 12 months in prison and up to 16 months probation Martynenko's Swiss lawyer Reza Vafadar stated that "in Switzerland a person is considered innocent and not convicted until all stages of the Swiss legal system have been passed - the appeal and the federal Supreme Court. "

On 8 December 2020 a Swiss State Police officer was fined for bribery but not for abuse of power, by a Zürich court, for receiving money from a former Stasi agent to investigate the Swiss Federal Court proceedings against Martynenko. The former Ukrainian politician was convicted of money laundering six month earlier, and sentenced to a lengthy prison sentence in Switzerland.

On 28 June 2024 The Appeals Chamber of the Swiss Federal Criminal Court acquits the former Ukrainian parliamentarian Martynenko and a co-accused of charges of serious money laundering in the second instance.
