= Our Ukraine (political party) =

Our Ukraine Наша Україна
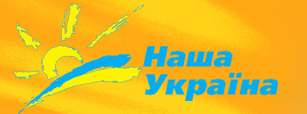
- Leader: Viktor Yushchenko
- Founded: 5 March 2005
- Headquarters: Kyiv
- Ideology: National Democracy; National liberalism; Economic liberalism; Liberal conservatism; Conservatism; Pro-Europeanism
- Political position: Centre-right
- Colours: Orange
- Verkhovna Rada: 0 / 450
- Regions (2010): 53 / 3,056

Our Ukraine (Ukrainian: Наша Україна, romanized: Nasha Ukraina), formerly known as People's Union "Our Ukraine" (Ukrainian: Народний Союз «Наша Україна», romanized: Narodnyi Soiuz "Nasha Ukraina"), is a centre-right political party of Ukraine formed in 2005. The party supported former president Viktor Yushchenko. Our Ukraine has not participated in national elections since the 2012 Ukrainian parliamentary election. And in the 2020 Ukrainian local elections the party gained no seats.

On 2 March 2013, there was an attempt to dissolve the party by Serhii Bondarchuk at one of the party congresses in Kyiv. However, the same day other sections of the party claimed this congress was illegal and the real party congress would be held on 18 May 2013. While never was officially listed under any status People's Union "Our Ukraine" was delisted as an observer in the European People's Party, according to press release of Batkivshchyna political party. Youth Union Our Ukraine is the youth wing of the party.

== History ==
=== As part of Our Ukraine Bloc ===
The party is the continuation of the electoral alliance of the Viktor Yushchenko Bloc known as "Our Ukraine". The NSNU was formally launched on March 5, 2005 by the group of politicians appointed by the incumbent President Viktor Yushchenko, but it failed to attract most constituent parties that had been members of the previous bloc, which refused to be absorbed into the newly formed party.

The constituent congress, held in the capital Kyiv and attended by 6,000 delegates from all the regions of Ukraine, elected Yushchenko as honorary chairman (who received membership card No.1). Former deputy Prime Minister Roman Bezsmertnyi was elected head of the party's Presidium and Yuriy Yekhanurov as head of the party's Central Executive Committee.

During the parliamentary elections on March 26, 2006, the party took part in the newly formed Our Ukraine bloc. In the snap parliamentary elections conducted on September 30, 2007, the party was part of the Our Ukraine–People's Self-Defense Bloc alliance, that won 72 (14,15% of the national vote) out of 450 seats in the Verkhovna Rada.

In December 2008, the Ukrainian Independent Information Agency (UNIAN) reported that the People's Union Our Ukraine and United Centre parties were to carry out a unifying congress on 17 January 2009. UNIAN also reported that the People's Democratic party may join the move. However, neither of the events happened. In October 2008, the presidium of People’s Union Our Ukraine party had already decided not to team up with any other party for the proposed snap parliamentary poll then the Our Ukraine–People's Self-Defense Bloc and had called the idea of teaming up with United Centre "impossible".

The Kyiv branch of the party decided not to take part in the party congress of June 2009 because they found the party "destructive".

In October 2009, the party stated it intended to take part in the October 2012 parliamentary elections. A March 2010 poll predicted that the party would get 1.4% of the vote in these elections (on 19 August 2009 Victor Yushchenko's support rating had already slumped to 3.8% and during the 2010 Ukrainian Presidential Election he won 5.5% of the votes).

=== Independently (since 2010) ===
During the 2010 Ukrainian local elections the party (political blocs were not permitted to compete in the election) met with total failure when it took only 2.3% of the national vote The party did quite well in the historical regions Volhynia and Galicia receiving minimal 5% of the votes up through 13.2%, but outside these regions it met with complete failure only managing to win 1.7% in Poltava Oblast, 0.9% in Zhytomyr Oblast and 0.7% in Kyiv Oblast.

A merging with other parties was discussed in September 2011 but was blocked by the party's council.

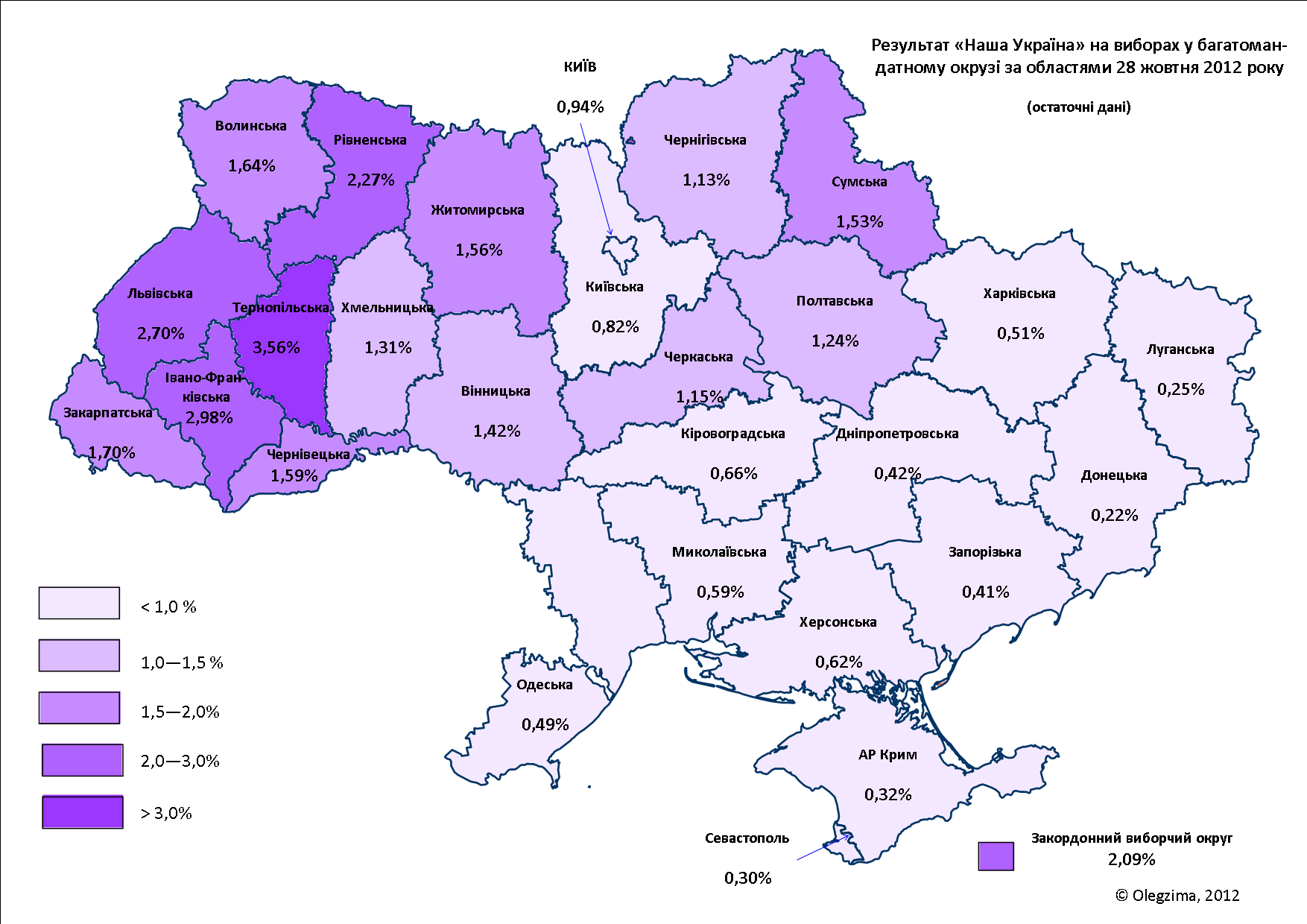
Results in the 2012 elections

In a December 2011, poll by Rating the party scored 1%. Since then, the rating in various polls of the party stayed around 1%.

The party announced that the Ukrainian People's Party would be merged into the party in December 2011. This process started mid-December 2011. Both parties were expected to be unified in February 2012. But by February 2013 Ukrainian People's Party was still an independent party. Nevertheless, they both teamed up with Congress of Ukrainian Nationalists in the 2012 Ukrainian parliamentary election. In this election this combination won 1.11% of the national votes and no constituencies and thus failed to win parliamentary representation. In this election Yushchenko headed the election list of Our Ukraine. The party itself had competed in 25 constituencies and lost in all.

The Ukrainian People's Party merged with People's Movement of Ukraine in May 2013.

=== March 2013 attempted dissolution and further history ===
On 9 February 2013, the Kyiv branch of the party, led by Sergii Bondarchuk, expelled Viktor Yushchenko from the party. The same day the political council of the party canceled this decision.

On 2 March 2013, a party congress in Kyiv dissolved Our Ukraine. However, the same day other sections of the party claimed this congress was illegal and that the "real" party congress would be held on 18 May 2013. They claimed the 2 March congress was illegitimate because its organizer, Serhiy Bondarchuk is a former member of the party. At the 2 March congress Bondarchuk urged to dissolve all current Ukrainian right wing extra-parliamentary parties and the creation of a single right-wing party. Bondarchuk tried unsuccessfully to remove the registration of Our Ukraine at the Ministry of Justice; they did not accept his documents. The remains of Our Ukraine re-registered its party members. (Note: Bondarchuk started (in March 2013) an initiative group to discuss the idea of creating a new political party.) On 6 September 2013, the party was deprived of its "observer status" in the European People's Party because "it did no more comply with the principles that the party declared when it joined the European People's Party". (Note: On 6 September 2013 the fellow Ukrainian party UDAR was granted "observer status" in the European People's Party.)

The party did not participate in the 2014 Ukrainian parliamentary election, it had intended to have a candidate in one single-seat constituency, but his registration was cancelled.

In October 2017, the Committee of Voters of Ukraine prepared an appeal to the National Agency on Corruption Prevention with a request to check the activities of 21 parties including the Movement of New Forces and Our Ukraine because of the presence of signs of shadow financing. The reason for initiating the verification of Our Ukraine was the lack of reporting on the Agency's website for the second quarter of 2017.

Our Ukraine did not participate in the 2019 Ukrainian parliamentary election.

Our Ukraine gained no seats in the 2020 Ukrainian local elections.

== Election results ==
Parliamentary since 1994 (year links to election page)
Year	Bloc	Votes	%	Mandates
2006	Our Ukraine	3,539,140	13.95	81 (0)
2007	Our Ukraine–People's Self-Defense Bloc	3,301,282	14.15	72 (0)
2012		226,482	1.11	0 (0)
