= Our Ukraine – People's Self-Defense Bloc =

Political alliance in Ukraine

Our Ukraine – People's Self-Defense Bloc Блок "Наша Україна–Народна Самооборона"
- Leader: Viktor Yushchenko
- Parliamentary leader: Mykola Martynenko
- Founded: 2001
- Dissolved: 15 December 2012
- Headquarters: Kyiv
- Ideology: National Democracy; Liberalism; Conservatism; Reformism
- European affiliation: European People's Party (observer only; NSNU and Rukh as separate member parties)
- Colours: Orange

Website
- www.razom.org.ua

The Our Ukraine – People's Self-Defense Bloc (Ukrainian: Блок Наша Україна – Народна Самооборона, romanized: Blok Nasha Ukraina – Narodna Samooborona, NUNS; until 2007 named Our Ukraine Bloc) was an electoral alliance active in Ukraine from 2001 until 2012, associated with former President Viktor Yushchenko. Since 2005, the bloc had been dominated by a core consisting of the People's Union "Our Ukraine" party and five smaller partner parties. On 17 November 2011, the Ukrainian Parliament approved an election law that banned the participation of blocs of political parties in parliamentary elections. Since then several members of the Bloc have since merged with other parties.

The Our Ukraine Bloc was most closely associated with the Orange Revolution and continued to use orange as its political colour even after the Orange Revolution had ended. In July 2007, the old Our Ukraine bloc was reorganized into the Our Ukraine – People's Self-Defense Bloc for the 2007 parliamentary election in September 2007.

== History ==
The original Our Ukraine Bloc formed in Kyiv, Ukraine in 2001 in preparation for the 2002 parliamentary elections as the Electoral Bloc of Viktor Yushchenko "Our Ukraine". At the time of its formation Viktor Yushchenko led the bloc. Over years the alliance changed its name, becoming:

- in 2002: Bloc of Viktor Yushchenko "Our Ukraine" (BVYNU)
- in 2006: the Our Ukraine Bloc (BNU)
- in 2007: the Our Ukraine – People's Self-Defense Bloc (BNU-NS)

=== Ukrainian parliamentary election, 2002 ===
At the 2002 legislative elections, won 23.6% of the popular vote and 112 out of 450 seats. It was the first time when Communists failed to take the first place in vote. Final poll results in 2002 had predicted the bloc to win 27-28% of the total votes. The alliance included the following parties:

- Congress of Ukrainian Nationalists
- Liberal Party of Ukraine
- Youth Party of Ukraine
- People's Movement of Ukraine
- Party of Christian-Popular Union
- Our Ukraine (originally)
- Republican Christian Party
- Solidarity
- Ukrainian People's Movement
- Forward, Ukraine!

Top 10 members

- Viktor Yushchenko (unaffiliated)
- Oleksandr Stoyan (unaffiliated)
- Hennadiy Udovenko (People's Movement of Ukraine)
- Yuriy Kostenko (Ukrainian People's Movement)
- Viktor Pynzenyk (Reforms and Order Party)
- Lilia Hryhorovych (People's Movement of Ukraine)
- Oleksandr Slobodyan (Ukrainian People's Movement)
- Ivan Zayets (Ukrainian People's Movement)
- Borys Tarasyuk (Reforms and Order Party)
- Mykola Zhulynskyi (Liberal Party of Ukraine)

In September 2002, the bloc was negotiating with nine pro-presidential (Kuchma) factions to form a coalition, a draft of a coalition agreement prepared by Our Ukraine faction member Yuri Kostenko and Labor Ukraine leader Serhiy Tyhypko was received by all faction leaders on 20 September 2009 (except by the leaders of the Socialist Party of Ukraine, the Communist Party and the Bloc Yulia Tymoshenko). However the coalition never materialised.

Between 2002 and 2004, the parliamentary faction of the bloc gradually lost members and by September 2005 it had 44 members (in May 2002 this number had been 119).

=== Ukrainian parliamentary election, 2006 ===
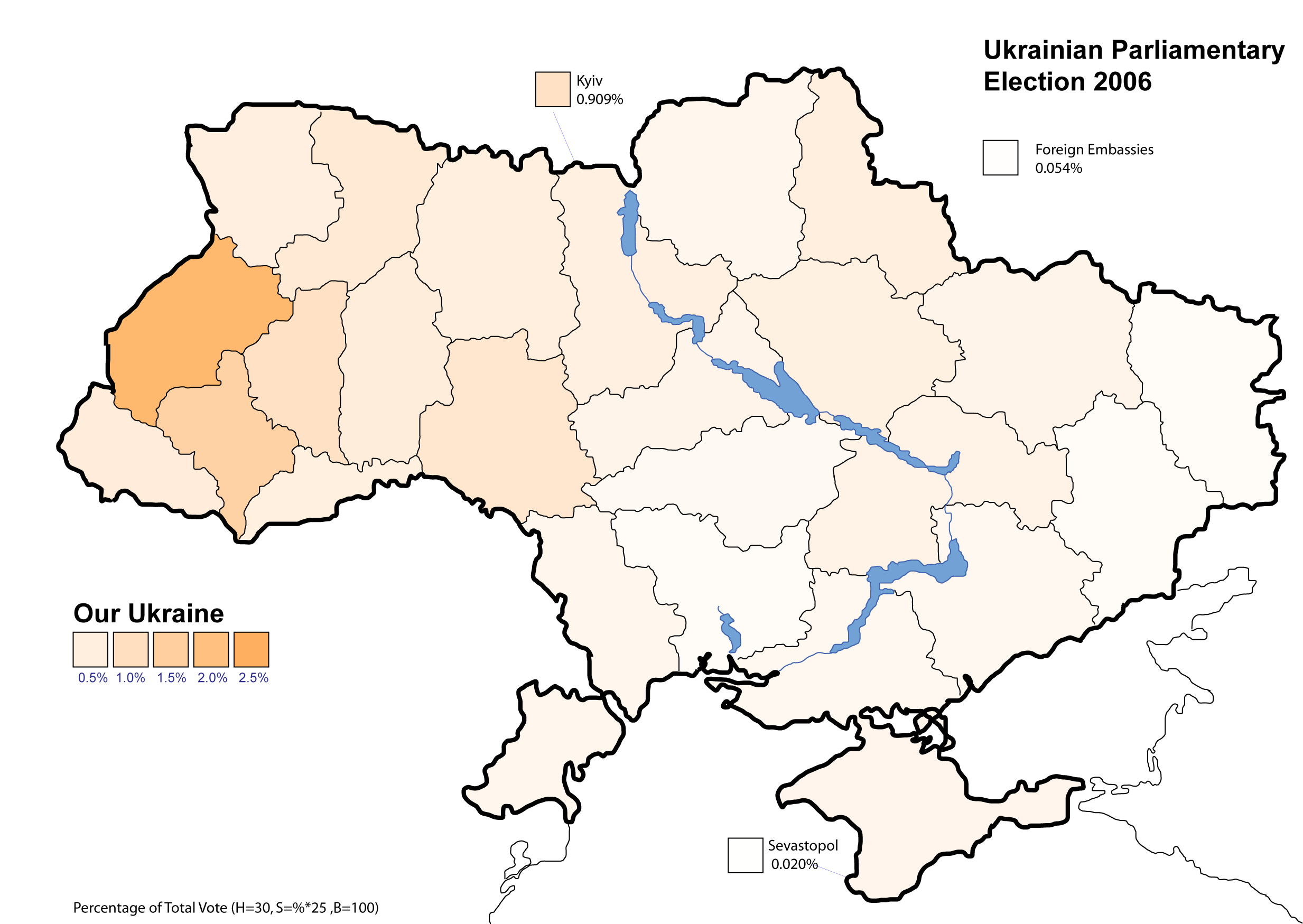
A map showing the results of Our Ukraine in Ukraine's oblasts during the 2006 parliamentary election.

During the election campaign some Yulia Tymoshenko Bloc members suspected Our Ukraine to be responsible for leaflets aimed against Yulia Tymoshenko, like fake invitations to celebrate her birthday at McDonald's.

The "Our Ukraine" bloc was soundly defeated in the 2006 Ukrainian parliamentary election with only 13,95% of the recorded vote and came in third place behind the Yulia Tymoshenko Bloc- 22% and 156 seats, and the Party of Regions-33% and 175 seats. It won 81 out of 450 seats.

The alliance included the following parties:

- People's Union Our Ukraine (40)
- Party of Industrialists and Entrepreneurs of Ukraine (7)
- People's Movement of Ukraine (10)
- Christian Democratic Union (3)
- Ukrainian Republican Party Assembly (3)
- Congress of Ukrainian Nationalists (3)
- Unaffiliated members (15)

Following the elections there has been calls for Ukraine's President Viktor Yushchenko who was closely aligned and spokesperson for Our Ukraine during the March Parliamentary election to resign from Our Ukraine and to stand independent.

Initially the Our Ukraine Bloc intended to join the Alliance of National Unity coalition and five of its ministers where initially appointed into the Cabinet of Ministers; Justice Minister Roman Zvarych, Family and Sports Minister Yuriy Pavlenko, Emergency Situations Minister Viktor Baloha, Culture Minister Ihor Likhovyy, and Health Minister Yuriy Polyachenko. Only 30 of the 80 deputies from Our Ukraine Bloc voted for approval of this Cabinet on 10 August 2006. However Our Ukraine Bloc did not join the coalition and it wanted the Communist Party to leave the coalition before they would enter it. Meanwhile, several parties member of the Bloc announced they would go into opposition and would never join the coalition. By November 2006 the five Our Ukraine Bloc ministers where dismissed by parliament or withdrawn by Our Ukraine Bloc.

Top 10 members

- Yuriy Yekhanurov (Our Ukraine)
- Anatoliy Kinakh (PPPU)
- Borys Tarasyuk (People's Movement of Ukraine)
- Olha Herasymiuk (unaffiliated)
- Ruslana Lezhychko (unaffiliated)
- Viacheslav Kyrylenko (unaffiliated)
- Ksenia Lyapina (Our Ukraine)
- Mykola Katerynchuk (Our Ukraine)
- Ruslan Knyazevych (unaffiliated)
- Lilia Hryhorovych (Our Ukraine)

=== Ukrainian parliamentary election, 2007 ===
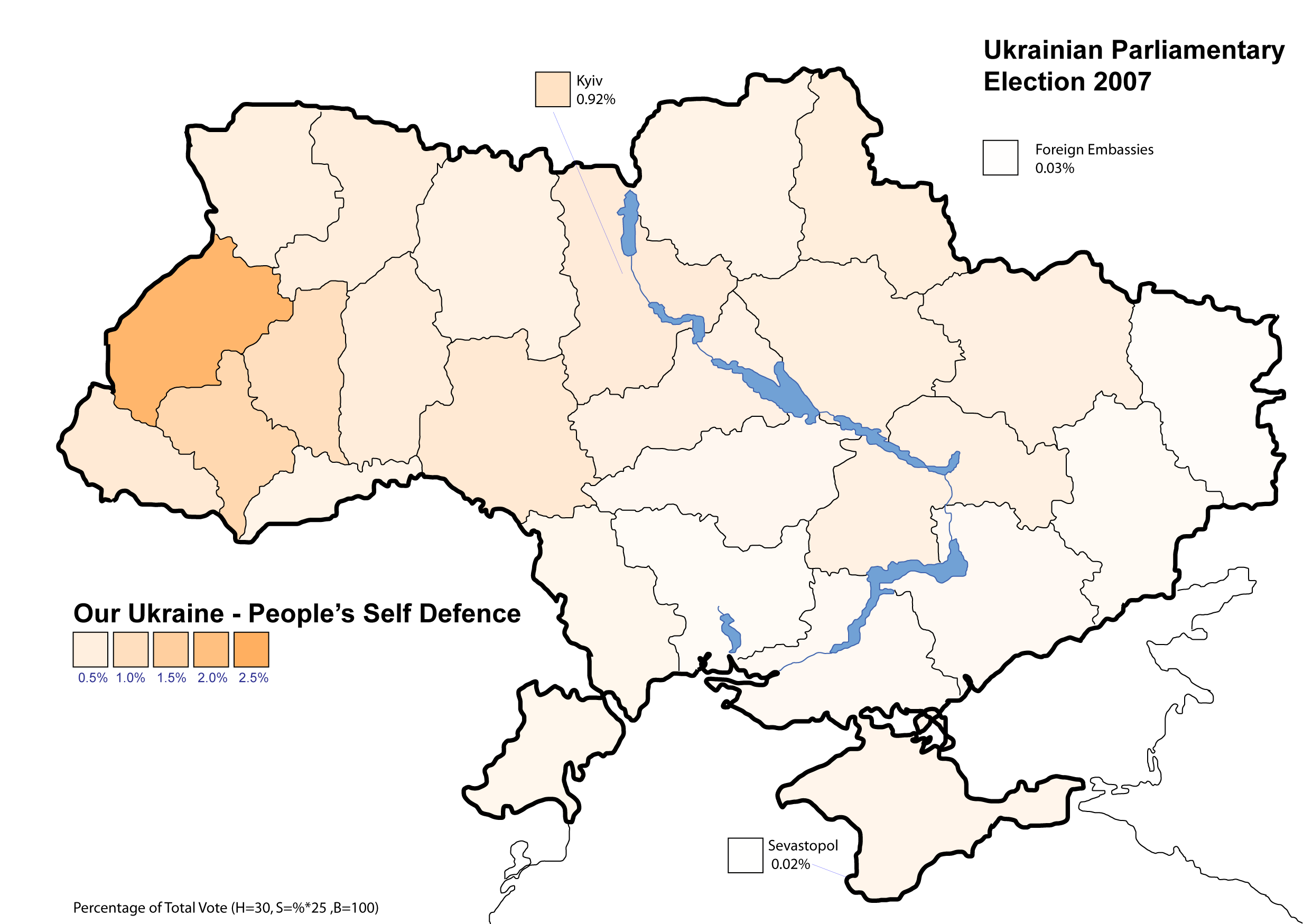
A map showing the results of Our Ukraine (percentage of total national vote) per region for the 2007 parliamentary election.

On 5 July 2007, 10 parties signed up to form the Our Ukraine – People's Self-Defense Bloc for the 2007 parliamentary election in September 2007. The Congress of Ukrainian Nationalists refused to join the Our Ukraine – People's Self-Defense Bloc in August 2007 and instead did not run in the elections.

In these elections the Our Ukraine – People's Self-Defense Bloc came third, after the Yulia Tymoshenko Bloc and the Party of Regions. Our Ukraine-People's Self Defense bloc won 72 seats and received 14.16% of the vote, 236,964 fewer votes in 2007 than the Our Ukraine bloc received in 2006, representing an overall swing of +0.20%.

The alliance included the following parties:

- People's Union "Our Ukraine"
- Forward, Ukraine!
- People's Movement of Ukraine
- Ukrainian People's Party
- Ukrainian Republican Party Assembly
- Christian Democratic Union
- European Party of Ukraine
- PORA
- Motherland Defenders Party

On 15 October 2007, despite the Party of Regions gaining the most seats of all participating political parties, Our Ukraine – People's Self-Defense Bloc and the Yulia Tymoshenko Bloc agreed to form a majority coalition in the new parliament of the 6th convocation. On 29 November, a coalition was signed between the Yulia Tymoshenko Bloc and Our Ukraine – People's Self-Defense Bloc (representing 45% of the national vote). On 18 December 2007, Yulia Tymoshenko, with a margin of two votes, was elected Prime Minister.

The member parties had planned to merge into a single party in December 2007, but on 16 November 2007 People’s Self-Defense decided to end its participation in the process of forming a united party since then that process remained unclear.

=== Disintegration and creation of United Centre ===
In February 2008, several prominent members resigned from the party. Viktor Baloha, Head of the President's Secretariat resigned on 15 February (to lift the issue of the correlation between the authorities as the President’s Chief of Staff and as a member of the OU-PSD presidium). Roman Bezsmertny, high ranked party official, along with people’s deputies, Mykhaylo Polyanchych, Ihor Kryl, Viktor Topolov, Oksana Bilozir and Vasyl Petevka resigned on 20 February, in a joint statement the declared that: "some of the leaders of the party play their own game, coming from personal interests and it has nothing to do with responsibility, pluralism and norms of democracy." Some of them formed United Centre who wanted to participate in the next parliamentary election independently. One of the main goals at the time was: "assisting President Viktor Yuschenko to realize its program of actions".

=== 2008 Ukrainian political crisis ===
On 21 October 2008, the presidium of People’s Union Our Ukraine party decided not to team up with any other party for the upcoming snap parliamentary poll and called the idea of teaming up with United Center Party "impossible". According to UNIAN the People’s Union Our Ukraine and United Centre parties will carry out a unifying congress on 17 January 2009. The People’s Democratic party may join the move.

On 23 October the Christian Democratic Union left the alliance and became part of the Leonid Chernovetskyi Bloc.

After a coalition was formed mid-December 2008 between Our Ukraine – People's Self-Defense Bloc (OU-OSD), Bloc of Yulia Tymoshenko (BYuT) and Lytvyn Bloc (LB) Yushchenko told journalists: "The fact is that the so-called coalition was formed on basis of political corruption, this coalition will be able to work only if the Communist Party will join it. Speaking about such a type of coalition, it is even more shameful." Victor Yushchenko also stated that Yulia Tymoshenko's desire to keep the Prime Minister's job was the main motive for creating the coalition and that he wanted to expel the Our Ukraine – People's Self-Defense Bloc lawmakers who supported the creating of the OU-PSD, BYuT and LB coalition from the list of members of parliament. According to the President Our Ukraine decided earlier at a party confession that it was impossible to resume its coalition with BYuT. Yushchenko described this as "a positive process, a process of purification. I have long waited that our people decide on their political choice, on their place in the party. They have made their choice, and I respect it".

=== Viktor Yanukovych presidency ===
During the January 2010 presidential election some bloc members did not endorse the bloc leader Viktor Yushchenko: the Christian Democratic Union, the European Party of Ukraine, the Civil Movement "People's Self-Defense" and Forward, Ukraine! endorsed Yulia Tymoshenko.

Early in March 2010, 37 (of the 55) Our Ukraine – People's Self-Defense Bloc faction members had voted for the continuation of the Second Tymoshenko Government coalition. The faction did reserve the right to negotiate a possible majority coalition with other parliamentary factions apart from the Yulia Tymoshenko Bloc; according to faction leader Mykola Martynenko the faction had offered to appoint its representative to the post of prime minister to prevent the concentration of power in one pair of hands and the Yulia Tymoshenko Bloc faction had flatly refused to surrender the post of prime minister.

On 11 March 2010 the Our Ukraine- People's Self Defense faction officially announced that it would be in opposition to the newly formed coalition. Martynenko stated the faction "did not intend 'to play under a scenario,' which proposes changes to the law on the regulations amending a procedure for the creation of the coalition".

On 12 May 2010 the parliamentary faction officially went into opposition.

The Our Ukraine - People's Self-Defense faction wanted to expel its seven members who backed ratification of the 2010 Ukrainian–Russian Naval Base for Natural Gas treaty in May 2010. In October 2010 one deputy of the Our Ukraine – People's Self-Defense Bloc faction joined the Lytvyn Bloc faction.

Twelve parliamentarians were expelled from the fraction in September 2011 for joining the governing coalition and/or for voting for the 2010 Ukrainian–Russian Natural Gas treaty. However, since only one of those twelve left the faction when Oleksandr Omelchenko left voluntary. Also in September, faction leader Mykola Martynenko joined the Front of Changes.

=== Dissolution ===
On 17 November 2011 the Ukrainian Parliament approved an election law that banned the participation of blocs of political parties in parliamentary elections. Therefore, the bloc could not participate in the 2012 parliamentary election. Our Ukraine and Ukrainian People's Party, Ukrainian Republican Party "Sobor" and People's Self-Defense Political Party (formally Forward, Ukraine!) have since merged with other parties. The People's Movement of Ukraine campaigned on one single party list during the 2012 parliamentary elections with (among others) former members of the Bloc Yulia Tymoshenko - the All-Ukrainian Union "Fatherland" and the Reforms and Order Party.

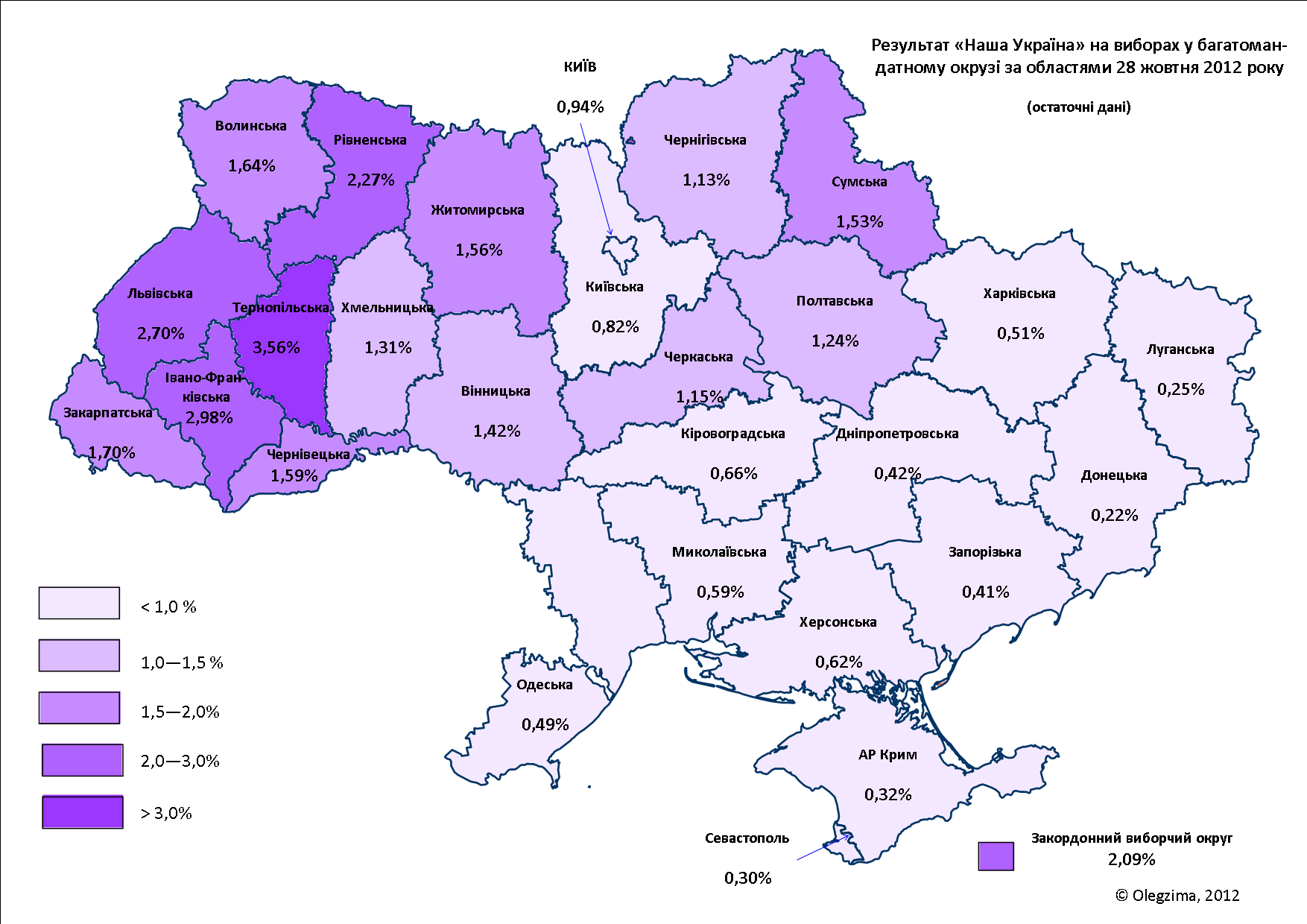
Results in the 2012 elections for former core party of the alliance People's Union "Our Ukraine"

The core party of the alliance, the People's Union "Our Ukraine", teamed up with the Congress of Ukrainian Nationalists and with the Ukrainian People's Party in the 2012 Ukrainian parliamentary election. Former leader of Our Ukraine – People's Self-Defense Bloc Viktor Yushchenko headed this election list. In these election this combination won 1.11% of the national votes and no constituencies and thus failed to win parliamentary representation.

By late November 2012 the Our Ukraine – People's Self-Defense Bloc faction consisted of 63 lawmakers of the original 72 elected in September 2007.

== Bloc's electoral results ==
Parliamentary (year links to election page)
Year	Votes	%	Mandates
2002	6,108,088	23,57	112
2006	3,539,140	13,95	81
2007	3,301,282	14,15	72

Presidential since 2004 (year links to election page)
Year	Candidate	Votes	%
2004	Viktor Yushchenko	15,115,712	51.99
2010	Viktor Yushchenko	1,341,534	5.45
2010	Yulia Tymoshenko (endorsed by Christian Democratic Union, European Party of Ukraine, Civil Movement "People's Self-Defense" and Forward, Ukraine!.	11,593,357	45.47

=== Results per region ===
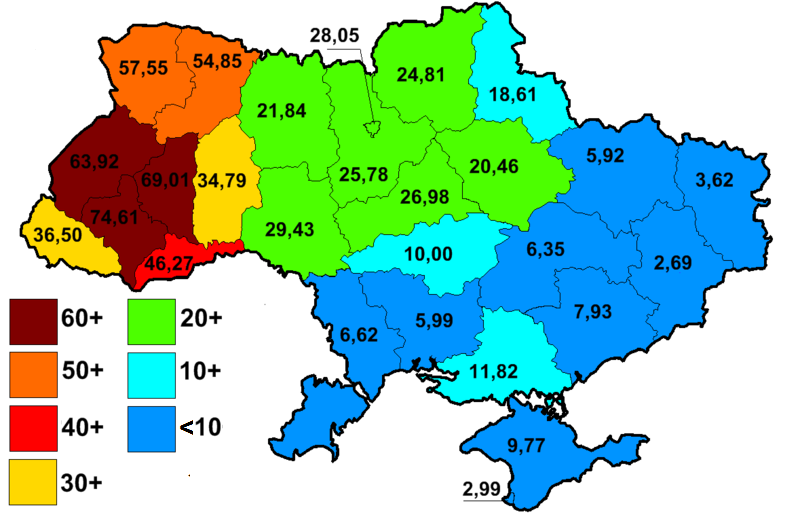
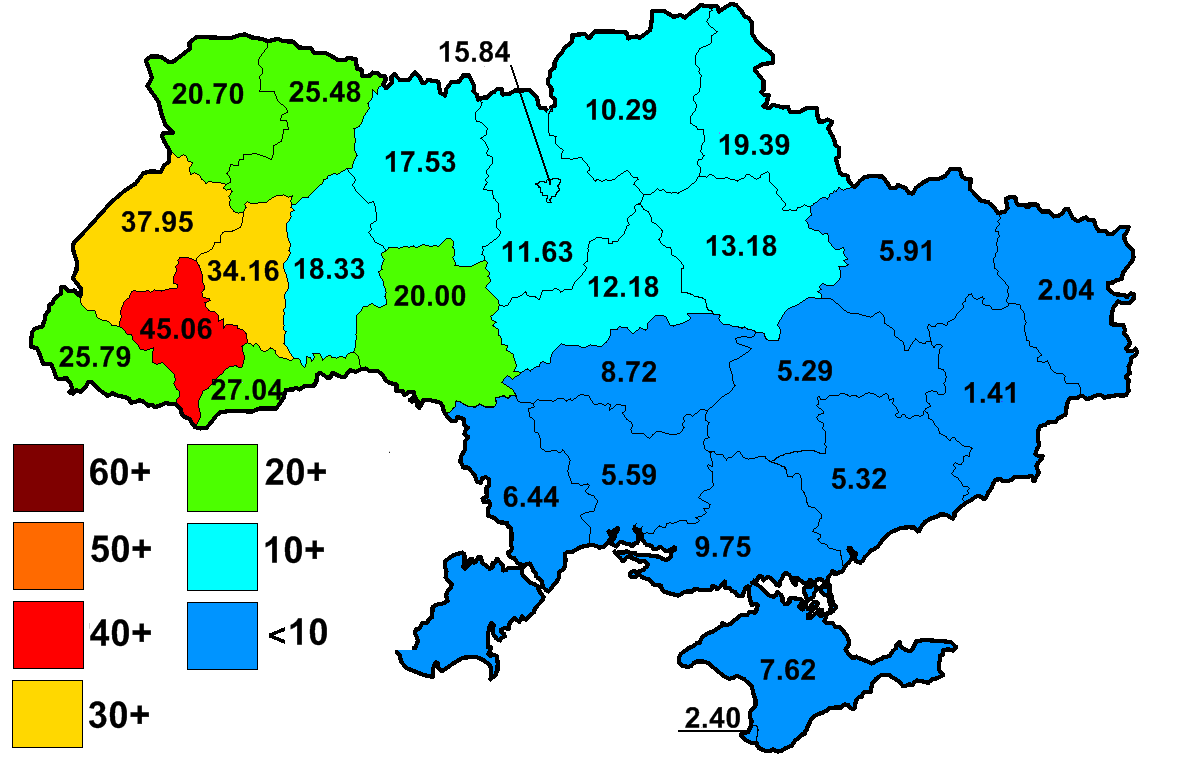
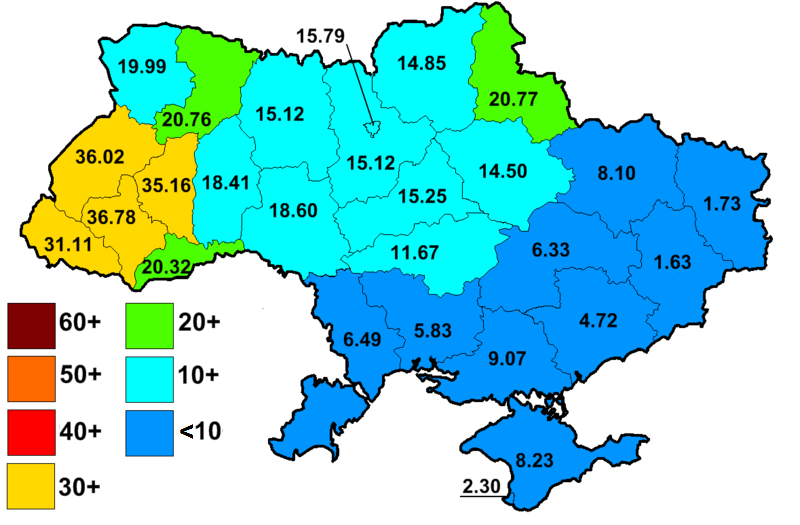
2002	2006	2007

== See also ==
- Category:Our Ukraine–People's Self-Defense Bloc politicians
- Liberalism in Ukraine
- Liberalism in Europe
