= Civil Movement "People's Self-Defense" =

Civil Movement "People's Self-Defense" Громадянський рух «Народна самооборона»
- Leader: Yuriy Lutsenko
- Ideology: Left-wing populism
- Political position: Left-wing
- International affiliation: none
- Colours: Red

Website
- http://www.samooborona.in.ua/

Civil Movement "People's Self-Defense" (Ukrainian: Громадянський рух «Народна самооборона», romanized: Hromadianskyi rukh «Narodna samooborona») is a political movement in Ukraine, headed by a former SPU member Yuriy Lutsenko.

== History ==
Yuriy Lutsenko created People's Self-Defence in January 2007 as a “broad public movement”. Its declared purpose was to secure an early parliamentary election and remove the Second Yanukovych Government. (Early elections were held on 30 September 2007.)

=== Possible dismantlement ===
In an interview with the Silski Visti (Village News) newspaper on 29 January 2009 Yuriy Lutsenko declared that "The People's Self-Defense as an insurgent, protesting, and not very structured civil movement has ceased to exist". Lutsenko also said he was planning to direct the organizational changes to the political party Forward, Ukraine!. In April 2010 Forward, Ukraine! renamed itself People's Self-Defense Political Party. Lutsenko became leader of that party.

In the spring of 2013 Lutsenko established the non-parliamentary movement "Third Republic".

== See also ==
- Yuriy Lutsenko's People's Self-Defense, electoral bloc and deputies' group
