= List of political parties in Ukraine =

There have been numerous political parties active in Ukraine in the past and present. Currently, as of 1 January 2020, there are 349 officially registered political parties in the country.

== Active ==
=== Parties represented in the Verkhovna Rada ===
==== Official factions ====
Political parties in Ukraine need to hold at least fifteen seats in parliament in order to be recognized as official parliamentary factions.

| Name | | Founded | Ideology | Political position | Verkhovna Rada | Oblast Councils | Regions | Associations |
|---|---|---|---|---|---|---|---|---|
| SN; СН | Servant of the People; Слуга народу | 2019 | Liberalism; Populism | Centre | 235 / 450 | 305 / 1,780 | 6,400 / 43,122 | European: ALDE |
| YeS; ЄС | European Solidarity; Європейська солідарність | 2000 | Liberal conservatism; Christian democracy; Pro-Europeanism | Centre-right | 27 / 450 | 283 / 1,780 | 3,905 / 43,122 | European: EPP (observer); International: IDU |
| VOB; ВОБ | Fatherland; Батьківщина | 1999 | Social democracy; Pro-Europeanism | Centre-left | 24 / 450 | 193 / 1,780 | 4,470 / 43,122 | European: EPP (observer); International: IDU |
| Holos; Голос | Holos; Голос | 2019 | Liberalism; Anti-corruption | Centre-right | 20 / 450 | 16 / 1,780 | 335 / 43,122 | European: ALDE |

==== Parliamentary groups ====
In the Verkhovna Rada, parliamentary groups are formed by deputies during a session of parliament. Usually, parliamentary groups are made up of independent deputies or deputies from parties that did not gain enough seats in parliament to form an official faction. Sometimes, they can also be formed through the splintering of official factions. Two parties in the current session of parliament, For the Future and Dovira, were originally formed as parliamentary groups after the 2019 Ukrainian parliamentary election but later expanded into full-fledged political parties.

| Party | | Founded | Ideology | Political position | Verkhovna Rada | Notes |
|---|---|---|---|---|---|---|
| PZZhM; ПЗЖМ | Platform for Life and Peace; Платформа за життя та мир | 2022 | Social democracy; Pro-Europeanism | Centre to centre-left | 21 / 450 | Mostly deputies from OPPZh. |
| Dovira; Довіра | Dovira; Довіра | 2019 | Regionalism | Big tent | 19 / 450 | |
| VU; ВУ | Restoration of Ukraine; Відновлення України | 2022 | Populism | Centre | 18 / 450 | Mostly deputies from OPPZh, but includes deputies from SN and Dovira. |
| ZM; ЗМ | For the Future; За майбутнє | 2019 | Populism; Liberalism; Economic nationalism | Centre-right | 17 / 450 | |
| Justice; Справедливість | "Justice" Deputy Association; ДО «Справедливість» | 2021 | Liberalism; Anti-corruption; Pro-Europeanism | Centre to centre-right | 11 / 450 | Split from Holos in response to leadership changes. |

==== Parties without faction status ====
Because of the use of first-past-the-post single-mandate electoral districts in Ukrainian parliamentary elections, it is possible for a political party to get fewer than fifteen seats in parliament, meaning that it is not recognized as an official faction. While these deputies were elected as representatives of their respective parties, and continue to be affiliated with their political parties during their time in office, they officially sit as independents. Often, they join parliamentary groups in order to gain more influence over the legislative process (while maintaining their affiliation to their original party).

| Party | | Founded | Ideology | Political position | Verkhovna Rada | Oblast Councils | Regions | Associations |
|---|---|---|---|---|---|---|---|---|
| Svoboda; Свобода | All-Ukrainian Union "Svoboda"; ВО «Свобода» | 1995 | Ultranationalism; Social conservatism; Right-wing populism | Far-right | 1 / 450 | 50 / 1,780 | 890 / 43,122 | |
| Self Reliance; Самопоміч | Union "Self Reliance"; Об'єднання «Самопоміч» | 2012 | Christian democracy; Liberal conservatism | Centre-right | 1 / 450 | 9 / 1,780 | 222 / 43,122 | National: Dovira; European: EPP (observer) |
| KAB; КАБ | Andriy Baloha's Team; Команда Андрія Балоги | 2008 | Populism; Pro-Europeanism | | 1 / 450 | 7 / 1,780 | 193 / 43,122 | National: For the Future |
| BTsR; БЦР | Bila Tserkva Together; Біла Церква разом | 2019 | Decentralization | | 1 / 450 | 0 / 1,780 | 9 / 43,122 | National: Trust |

=== Parties represented in Oblast Councils ===
Ukraine is made up of 24 oblasts, as well as two cities with special status (Kyiv and Sevastopol) and one autonomous republic (the Autonomous Republic of Crimea). All of these entities have oblast Councils (or city councils in the case of Kyiv and Sevastopol), which function as regional legislatures, and are the second level of government after the Verkhovna Rada. In total, there are 1,780 seats across all oblast Councils in Ukraine. These parties have representation on at least one oblast Councils, but no seats in parliament.

| Party | | Founded | Ideology/Political position | Oblast Councils | Regions | Region |
|---|---|---|---|---|---|---|
| Successful Kharkiv; Успішний Харків | Kernes Bloc — Successful Kharkiv; Блок Кернеса — Успішний Харків | 2020 | Social democracy Regionalism Centre-left | 46 / 1,780 | 433 / 43,122 | Kharkiv |
| USH; УСГ | Ukrainian Strategy of Groysman; Українська стратегія Гройсмана | 2015 | Centre to centre-left | 40 / 1,780 | 574 / 43,122 | National |
| Proposition; Пропозиція | Proposition; Пропозиція | 2020 | Regionalism | 35 / 1,780 | 549 / 43,122 | National |
| UDAR (Note: Literally "PUNCH" in reference to party leader Vitali Klitschko, a former professional boxer); УДАР | Ukrainian Democratic Alliance for Reform; Український демократичний альянс за реформи Віталія Кличка | 2010 | Centre to centre-right | 30 / 1,780 | 183 / 43,122 | National |
| RPOL; РПОЛ | Radical Party of Oleh Liashko; Радикальна Партія Олега Ляшка | 2010 | Left-wing | 27 / 1,780 | 582 / 43,122 | National |
| RD; РД | Native Home; Рідний дім | 2015 | Regionalism | 19 / 1,780 | 438 / 43,122 | Chernihiv |
| Cherkashchany; Черкащани | All-Ukrainian Union "Cherkashchany"; Всеукраїнське об'єднання «Черкащани» | 2015 | Regionalism | 18 / 1,780 | 343 / 43,122 | Cherkasy |
| Together! Разом! | Svitlychna Bloc — Together! Блок Світличної «Разом!» | 2020 | Centre to centre-right | 17 / 1,780 | 320 / 43,122 | Kharkiv |
| SCh; СЧ | Strength and Honor; Сила і честь | 2009 | Centre-right | 16 / 1,780 | 575 / 43,122 | National |
| Vilkul Bloc; Блок Вілкула | Vilkul Bloc — Ukrainian Perspective; Блок Вілкула «Українська Перспектива» | 2020 | Regionalism | 16 / 1,780 | 272 / 43,122 | Dnipropetrovsk |
| Unity; Єдність | Unity of Oleksandr Omelchenko; Єдність Олександра Омельченка | 1999 | Centre-right | 14 / 1,780 | 14 / 43,122 | Kyiv City |
| KS; КС | Symchyshyn's Team; Команда Симчишина | 2015 | Regionalism | 13 / 1,780 | 74 / 43,122 | Khmelnytskyi |
| NTZh! НТЖ! | Ihor Kolykhaiev's "We Have to Live Here!"; Партія Ігоря Колихаєва «Нам тут жити!» | 2020 | Regionalism | 13 / 1,780 | 215 / 43,122 | Kherson |
| APU; АПУ | Agrarian Party of Ukraine; Аграрна партія України | 2006 | Agrarianism | 12 / 1,780 | 313 / 43,122 | National |
| RZ; РЗ | Native Zakarpattia; Рідне Закарпаття | 2020 | Regionalism | 12 / 1,780 | 354 / 43,122 | Zakarpattia |
| DD; ДД | Trust the Deeds; Довіряй ділам | 2020 | Regionalism | 11 / 1,780 | 227 / 43,122 | Odesa |
| PH; ПГ | All-Ukrainian Union "Community Platform"; Всеукраїнське об'єднання «Платформа Громад» | 2019 | Regionalism | 11 / 1,780 | 216 / 43,122 | Ivano-Frankivsk |
| Solutions; Справи | For Tangible Solutions; За конкретні справи | 2015 | Regionalism | 10 / 1,780 | 306 / 43,122 | Khmelnytskyi |
| HS; ГС | Community Power Party; Громадська сила | 2010 | Regionalism | 9 / 1,780 | 47 / 43,122 | Dnipropetrovsk |
| United; Єднання | Volodymyr Buryak — United; Партія Володимира Буряка «Єднання» | 2020 | Regionalism | 9 / 1,780 | 62 / 43,122 | Zaporizhzhia |
| Native City; Рідне місто | Native City; Рідне місто | 2018 | Regionalism | 9 / 1,780 | 224 / 43,122 | Poltava |
| YeA; ЄА | United Alternative; Єдина Альтернатива | 2020 | Regionalism | 9 / 1,780 | 74 / 43,122 | Chernivtsi |
| KMKSZ; КМКС | Party of Hungarians of Ukraine; Партія угорців України | 2005 | Regionalism; Hungarian minority interests | 8 / 1,780 | 128 / 43,122 | Zakarpattia |
| UHP; УГП | Ukrainian Galician Party; Українська Галицька партія | 2014 | Centre-right | 7 / 1,780 | 219 / 43,122 | Western Ukraine |
| Rukh; Рух | People's Movement of Ukraine; Народний рух України | 1990 | Centre-right | 6 / 1,780 | 202 / 43,122 | National |
| NK; НК | People's Control; Громадський рух «Народний контроль» | 2015 | Centre-right | 6 / 1,780 | 79 / 43,122 | Chernivtsi |

=== Parties with local representation ===
These political parties have no seats in parliament or any regional legislature, but do have local representation on city or town councils, mayorships, or other municipal bodies. Many of these parties are local organizations and operate only in a specific city or oblast.

| Party | | Founded | Ideology/political position | Regions | Region |
|---|---|---|---|---|---|
| SL; СЛ | Power of the People; Сила Людей | 2014 | Liberalism; Pro-Europeanism | 152 / 43,122 | National |
| Order; Порядок | Order; Порядок | 2020 | Regionalism | 137 / 43,122 | Zaporizhzhia Oblast |
| HP; ГП | Civil Position; Громадянська позиція | 2005 | Economic liberalism; Pro-Europeanism | 135 / 43,122 | National |
| Victory; Перемога | Palchevsky's Victory; Перемога Пальчевського | 2020 | Centre; Russophilia | 62 / 43,122 | National |
| BVB; БВБ | Vadym Boychenko Bloc; Блок Вадима Бойченка | 2014 | Regionalism | 59 / 43,122 | Mariupol, Donetsk Oblast |
| New Faces; Нові обличчя | New Faces; Нові обличчя | 2015 | Regionalism | 53 / 43,122 | Kyiv Oblast |
| KSM; КСМ | Serhii Minko's Team; Команда Сергія Мінька | 2010 | Regionalism | 46 / 43,122 | Melitopol, Zaporizhzhia Oblast |
| ChZ! ЧЗ! | Serhii Rudyk's Team — Time for Change! Команда Сергія Рудика. Час змін! | 2014 | Regionalism | 41 / 43,122 | Cherkasy Oblast |
| EPU; ЄПУ | European Party of Ukraine; Європейська партія України | 2006 | Liberalism; Pro-Europeanism | 39 / 43,122 | National |
| New Politics; Нова політика | New Politics; Нова політика | 2001 | Regionalism | 39 / 43,122 | Eastern Ukraine |
| Bee; Бджола | Bee; Бджола | 2019 | Regionalism | 34 / 43,122 | Kamianske, Dnipropetrovsk Oblast |
| VARTA; ВАРТА | All-Ukrainian Alliance of Regional and Territorial Activists; Всеукраїнський альянс регіональних і територіальних активістів | 2020 | Ukrainian nationalism; Pro-Europeanism | 33 / 43,122 | Western Ukraine |
| UNP; УНП | Ukrainian People's Party; Українська Народна Партія | 1999 | Conservatism; Pro-Europeanism | 30 / 43,122 | National |
| PARMS; ПАРМС | Party of Local Self Government; Партія місцевого самоврядування | 2009 | Local government | 26 / 43,122 | National |
| PZU; ПЗУ | Party of Greens of Ukraine; Партія Зелених України | 1990 | Green politics | 24 / 43,122 | National |

=== Other parties ===
Currently active political parties in Ukraine with no seats in parliament nor in Oblast Councils.

| Party | | Est. | Ideology/Political position |
|---|---|---|---|
| KhS; ХС | Party of Christian Socialists; Партія Християнських соціалістів | 2018 | Christian socialism Russophilia; Left-wing |
| SDPU(o); СДПУ(о) | Social Democratic Party of Ukraine (united); Соцiал-демократична партія України (об'єднана) | 1995 | Social democracy Russophilia; Centre |
| SDPU; СДПУ | Social Democratic Party of Ukraine; Соцiал-демократична партія України | 1990 | Democratic socialism Federalism; Left-wing |
| | Ukraine – Forward! Україна – Вперед! | 1998 | Social democracy Centre-left |
| | Soyuz; Партія "Союз" | 1997 | Crimean regionalism Russophilia; Big tent |
| SelPU; СелПУ | Peasant Party of Ukraine; Селянська партія України | 1992 | Agrarianism; Centre-left to left-wing |
| Zastup; Заступ | All-Ukrainian Agrarian Association "Spade"; Всеукраїнське аграрне об'єднання "Заступ" | 2011 | Agrarianism; Left-wing |
| | Strong Ukraine; Сильна Україна | 1999 | Social liberalism Centre to centre-left |
| Vidrodzhennia; Відродження | Revival; Відродження | 2004 | Economic nationalism Russophilia; Centre |
| | Democratic Party of Ukraine; Демократична партія України | 1990 | National Democracy; Centre-right |
| RP; РП | Republican Platform; Республіканська платформа | 1990 | Liberal conservatism Civic nationalism Centre-right |
| | For Ukraine! За Україну! | 1999 | Conservatism; Centre-right |
| | Our Ukraine; Наша Україна | 2005 | National Democracy; Pro-Europeanism; Centre-right |
| DA; ДА | Democratic Alliance; Демократичний альянс | 2011 | Christian democracy Centre-right |
| NF; НФ | People's Front; Народний фронт | 2014 | National Democracy; Pro-Europeanism; Centre-right to right-wing |
| LDPU; ЛДПУ | Liberal Democratic Party of Ukraine; Ліберально-демократична партія України | 1992 | Liberalism; Centre-right |
| | Hromada; Громада | 1994 | Populism; Centre-left |
| KhDS; ХДС | Christian Democratic Union; Християнсько-Демократичний Союз | 1997 | Christian democracy Conservatism; Centre-right |
| D7; Д7 | Democratic Axe; Демократична сокира | 2018 | National liberalism |
| 5.10 | Libertarian Party "5.10"; Лібертаріанська партія «5.10» | 2014 | Libertarianism; Minarchism; Right-wing |
| RS; РС | Right Sector; Правий сектор | 2013 | Ultranationalism; Hard Euroscepticism; Right-wing to far-right |
| PVD; ПВД | Party of Free Democrats; Партія вільних демократів | 1999 | |
| IP; ІП | Internet Party of Ukraine; Інтернет партія України | 2009 | E-government |
| PND; ПНД | All-Ukrainian Party of People's Trust; Всеукраїнська партія народної довіри | 2000 | Economic nationalism |
| NC; НК | National Corps; Національний корпус | 2016 | Ultranationalism; Euroscepticism; Far-right |
| PMSBU; ПСМБУ | Political Party of Small and Medium-sized Businesses of Ukraine; Політична партія малого і середнього бізнесу України | 1999 | Economic liberalism |
| UD; УД | Ukrainian Home; Український дім | 2004 | Christian democracy |
| UNS; УНС | Ukrainian National Union; Український Національний Союз | 2009 | Far Right |
| PS; ПС | Justice Party; Партія "Справедливість" | 2011 | Social democracy |
| Aktsent; Акцент | Aktsent; Акцент | 1993 | Liberal conservatism |
| UND; УНД | Ukraine is Our Home; Україна – наш дiм | 2021 | Social conservatism |
| PPU; ППУ | Party of Pensioners of Ukraine; Партія пенсіонерів України | 1999 | |
| Volt; Вольт | Volt Ukraine; Вольт Україна | 2022 | Social liberalism Pro-Europeanism |
| PZV; ПЗВ | Motherland Defenders Party; Партія захисників Вітчизни | 1997 | |
| PPPU; ПППУ | Party of Industrialists and Entrepreneurs of Ukraine; Партія промисловців і підприємців України | 2000 | |

== Defunct ==
=== Banned parties ===
| Party | Founded | Banned | Ideology/political position | Verkhovna Rada at last election | Regions at last election |
|---|---|---|---|---|---|
| Communist Party of Ukraine (Soviet Union); Комуністична партія України (СССР) | 1918 | 1991 | Communism; Far-left | 239 / 450 | |
| Russian Bloc; Руський блок | 2001 | 2014 | Pan-Slavism; Russophilia | 0 / 450 | |
| Russian Unity; Руська Єдність | 2008 | 2014 | Russophilia; Right-wing | 0 / 450 | |
| Communist Party of Ukraine; Комуністична партія України | 1993 | 2022 | Communism; Russophilia; Far-left | 0 / 450 | |
| Communist Party of Ukraine (renewed); Комуністична партія України (оновлена) | 2000 | 2015 | Communism; Far-left | 0 / 450 | |
| Communist Party of Workers and Peasants; Комуністична партія робітників і селян | 2001 | 2015 | Communism; Far-left | 0 / 450 | |
| Union of Communists of Ukraine; Союз комуністів України | 1992 | 2015 | Communism; Anti-revisionism; Far-left | 0 / 450 | |
| Party of Shariy; Партія Шарія | 2015 | 2022 | Libertarianism; Russophilia; Right-wing | 0 / 450 | 52 / 43,122 |
| Party of Regions; Партія регіонів | 1997 | 2023 | Social democracy Russophilia; Centre-left | 185 / 450 | 1,587 / 3,056 |
| Our Land; Наш край | 2011 | 2025 | Welfarism; Russophilia; Centre | 0 / 450 | 1,892 / 43,122 |
| Ukrainian Choice – Right of the People; Український вибір — право народу | 2012 | 2022 | Conservatism; Russophilia; Right-wing | 0 / 450 | |
| Opposition Bloc; Опозиційний блок | 2010 | 2018 | Social liberalism Russophilia; Centre to centre-left | 29 / 450 | 4,026 / 158,399 |
| Opposition Platform — For Life; Опозиційна платформа – За життя | 1999 | 2022 | Social democracy Russophilia; Left-wing | 43 / 450 | 4,215 / 43,122 |
| Opposition Bloc — Party for Peace and Development; Опозиційний блок — Партія миру та розвитку | 2014 | 2022 | Social liberalism Russophilia; Centre to centre-left | 6 / 450 | 208 / 43,122 |
| Socialist Party of Ukraine; Соціалістична партія України | 1991 | 2022 | Social democracy Democratic socialism Centre-left to left-wing | 33 / 450 | |
| Progressive Socialist Party of Ukraine; Прогресивна соціалістична партія України | 1996 | 2022 | National Bolshevism; Russophilia; Far-left | 16 / 450 | |
| Derzhava; Держава | 1999 | 2022 | Socialism; Left-wing | 0 / 450 | |
| Union of Left Forces; Союз лівих сил | 2007 | 2022 | Socialist populism Left-wing | 0 / 450 | |
| Nashi; НАШI | 2015 | 2022 | Russophilia; Centre-left | 0 / 450 | |
| Left Opposition; Ліва опозиція | 2015 | 2022 | Russophilia; Left-wing to far-left | 0 / 450 | |
| Ukrainian Association of Patriots; Українське об'єднання патріотів | 2015 | 2020 | Social market economy Syncretic | 0 / 450 | |
| Volodymyr Saldo Bloc; Блок Володимира Сальдо | 2019 | 2022 | Kherson regionalism Russophilia; Centre | 0 / 450 | |
| Slavic Party; Слов'янська партія | 1993 | 2024 | Pan-Slavism; Centre-left | 2 / 450 | |
| Reforms and Order Party; Партія "Реформи і порядок" | 1997 | 2013 | Liberalism; National Democracy; Centre-right | 3 / 450 | |
| Labour Ukraine; Трудова Україна | 2000 | 2018 | Labourism; Liberalism; Centre-left | 0 / 450 | |
| Socialists; Соціалісти | 2014 | 2022 | Socialism; Left-wing | 0 / 450 | |

On 20 March 2022, in the midst of the 2022 Russian invasion of Ukraine, president of Ukraine Volodymyr Zelenskyy announced the suspension of eleven political parties with claimed ties to Russia, which would last until the end of martial law in Ukraine. Two of the suspended political parties, Opposition Platform — For Life and Opposition Bloc, have a significant presence in national politics, while the remaining nine parties are marginal. In June 2022 various court proceedings tried to ban the parties suspended on 20 March 2022. Of all the parties suspended on 20 March 2022 only the Progressive Socialist Party of Ukraine and Opposition Platform — For Life actively opposed its banning. In September 2022 the final appeals against the parties' ban were dismissed by the Supreme Court of Ukraine, meaning that the parties were fully banned in Ukraine.

=== Former parliamentary parties ===
| Individual parties | years in parliament | Block association (years) |
|---|---|---|
| Communist Party of Ukraine (Soviet Union) (succeeded by Socialist Party of Ukraine) | 1937 – 1994 | Bloc of Communists and Komsomol activists |
| People's Movement of Ukraine | 1990 – 2014 | Our Ukraine Bloc (2002 – 2006); Our Ukraine–People's Self-Defense Bloc (2007 – 2012); Fatherland-Unites Opposition (2012 – 2014) |
| Communist Party of Ukraine | 1994 – 2014 | |
| Socialist Party of Ukraine (preceded by Communist Party of Ukraine (Soviet Union)) | 1994 – 2007 | Bloc of SPU-SelPU (1998 – 2002) |
| Congress of Ukrainian Nationalists | 1994 – 2002; 2002 – 2007 | National Front (1998 – 2002); Bloc of Viktor Yushchenko (Our Ukraine) (2002–2007) |
| Peasant Party of Ukraine | 1994 – 2002 | Bloc of SPU-SelPU (1998 – 2002) |
| Ukrainian National Assembly | 1994 – 1998 | |
| Party of Labor | 1994 – 1998 | |
| Social Democratic Party of Ukraine (united) | 1994 – 2006 | |
| Democratic Party of Ukraine | 1994 – 2006 | Bloc of DemPU-DemU (2002 – 2006) |
| Ukrainian Conservative Republican Party | 1994 – 1998 | |
| Christian Democratic Party of Ukraine | 1994 – 1998 | |
| Party of Democratic Revival of Ukraine | 1994 – 1998 | |
| Social Democratic Party of Ukraine | 1994 – 1998 | |
| Ukrainian Republican Party | 1994 – 2002 | National Front (1998 – 2002) |
| Party of Economic Revival of Crimea | 1994 – 1998 | |
| Party of Regions (succeeded by Opposition Bloc) | 1997 – 2014 | For United Ukraine (2002) |
| People's Party | 1998 – 2002; 2007 – 2014 | For United Ukraine (2002); Lytvyn Bloc (2006 – 2014) |
| Union Party | 1998 – 2002; 2012 – 2014 | |
| People's Democratic Party | 1998 – 2006 | For United Ukraine (2002 – 2006) |
| Progressive Socialist Party of Ukraine | 1998 – 2002 | |
| Party of Greens of Ukraine | 1998 – 2002 | |
| Hromada | 1998 – 2002 | |
| Party "Union" | 1998 – 2002 | |
| Labour Ukraine | 2002 – 2006 | For United Ukraine (2002 – 2006) |
| Party of Industrialists and Entrepreneurs | 2002 – 2006; 2006 – 2007 | For United Ukraine (2002 – 2006); Our Ukraine bloc (2006 – 2007) |
| People's Self-Defense (also as Forward, Ukraine!) | 2002 – 2014 | Our Ukraine Bloc (2002 – 2006); Our Ukraine–People's Self-Defense Bloc (2007 – 2012); Fatherland-Unites Opposition (2012 – 2014) |
| Democratic Union | 2002 – 2006 | Bloc of DemPU-DemU (2002–2006) |
| Party of National Economic Development of Ukraine | 2002 – 2006 | |
| Ukrainian Marine Party | 2002 – 2006 | |
| Unity | 2002 – 2006 | Unity (2002–2006) |
| Social Democratic Union | 2002 – 2006 | Unity (2002 – 2006) |
| Young Ukraine | 2002 – 2006 | Unity (2002 – 2006) |
| Ukrainian Party of Justice - Union of Veterans, Handicapped, Chornobilians, Afghans | 2002 – 2006 | Unity (2002 – 2006) |
| Solidarity | 2002 – 2006 | Bloc of Viktor Yushchenko (2002 – 2006) |
| Ukrainian People's Party | 2002 – 2006; 2007 – 2012 | Bloc of Viktor Yushchenko (2002 – 2006); Our Ukraine–People's Self-Defense Bloc (2007–2012) |
| Republican Christian Party | 2002 – 2006 | Bloc of Viktor Yushchenko (2002 – 2006) |
| Youth Party of Ukraine | 2002 – 2006 | Bloc of Viktor Yushchenko (2002 – 2006) |
| Ukrainian Social Democratic Party | 2002 – 2012 | Bloc of Yulia Tymoshenko (2002 – 2012) |
| Ukrainian Platform "Assembly" | 2002 – 2006; 2006 – 2012 | Bloc of Yulia Tymoshenko (2002 – 2006); Our Ukraine–People's Self-Defense Bloc (Our Ukraine) (2006 – 2012) |
| Our Ukraine | 2006 – 2012 | Our Ukraine–People's Self-Defense Bloc (Our Ukraine) (2006 – 2012) |
| Motherland Defenders Party | 2007 – 2012 | Our Ukraine–People's Self-Defense Bloc (2007 – 2012) |
| It's time! | 2007 – 2012 | Our Ukraine–People's Self-Defense Bloc (2007 – 2012) |
| Labour Party Ukraine | 2007 – 2012 | Bloc of Volodymyr Lytvyn (2007 – 2012) |
| For Ukraine! | 2012 – 2014 | Fatherland-Unites Opposition (2012 – 2014) |
| Social Christian Party | 2012 – 2014 | Fatherland-Unites Opposition (2012 – 2014) |
| Civil Position | 2012 – 2014 | Fatherland-Unites Opposition (2012 – 2014) |

A faction of nonpartisan deputies under the name Reforms for the Future existed between 16 February 2011 and 15 December 2012. A faction of nonpartisan deputies under the name For Peace and Stability existed between 2 July 2014 and 27 November 2014. From 1998 to 2000, there was another parliamentary faction Labour Ukraine that existed without its political party until it was registered by the Ukrainian Ministry of Justice in June 2000.

The Communist Party of Ukraine (Soviet Union) was prohibited in 1991, however its members were not excluded from the Ukrainian parliament. They formed a parliamentary faction of the Socialist Party of Ukraine. For the 1994 parliamentary elections however the ban on communist parties was lifted and there were two parties with similar ideologies running for parliament the Socialist Party of Ukraine and the Communist Party of Ukraine that was reestablished in 1993.

=== Other defunct political parties ===
List of defunct political parties by founding year:

- All-Ukrainian Political Movement "State Independence of Ukraine" (1990-2003)
- Ukrainian Beer Lovers Party (1991–1997)
- Party of Economic Revival (1992-2003)
- Republican Party of Crimea (1992-1995)
- Party of Regions (1997-2014)

=== Party mergers ===
- Party of Democratic Revival of Ukraine (1990-1996), merged with People's Democratic Party in 1996.
- Toiling Congress of Ukraine (1993-1996), merged with People's Democratic Party in 1996.
- Union of Support for Republic of Crimea, merged with People's Democratic Party in 1996.
- Party of Labor (1992-2000), merged with the Party of Regions in 2000.
- Ukrainian Conservative Republican Party (1992-2001), merged with the All-Ukrainian Union "Fatherland" in 2001.
- Ukrainian People's Party "Sobor", merged with the Ukrainian Republican Party "Sobor" in 2002.
- People's Power (2004-2011), merged with the United Left and Peasants in 2011.
- Rural Revival Party (1993-2011), merged with the United Left and Peasants in 2011.
- Ukrainian Peasant Democratic Party (1991-2011), merged with United Left and Peasants in 2011.
- Front for Change (2007-2013), merged with the All-Ukrainian Union "Fatherland" in 2013.
- Reforms and Order Party (1997-2013), merged with the All-Ukrainian Union "Fatherland" in 2013.
- Ukrainian National Assembly (1994-2014), merged with the Right Sector in 2014.

=== Defunct political alliances and blocs (1998–2012) ===
The idea of electoral blocs as a loose association of parties was introduced in 1998, however it did not become popular right away. The real success of electoral blocks came in 2002 when the Bloc of Victor Yushchenko "Our Ukraine" gained the most parliamentary seats. The electoral blocs system was liquidated in 2011 forcing registration of individual parties for the next 2012 parliamentary elections. The longest existing political blocs were Our Ukraine and Bloc of Yulia Tymoshenko.

The association of parties however was transformed into a new concept of an "umbrella party" when several parties temporarily unite under such party that becomes a core party of informal electoral bloc. Below is the list of official electoral blocs in 1998 - 2012 that led to creation of their own parliamentary factions.

- Bloc of SPU-SelPU (1998–2002)
- Our Ukraine (2002–2012; Bloc of Viktor Yushchenko, Our Ukraine-People's Self-Defense Bloc)
- For United Ukraine (2002–2006)
- Bloc of Yulia Tymoshenko (2002–2012)
- Bloc of Volodymyr Lytvyn (2007–2012)

==== Minor blocs ====
The following blocs did not form their parliamentary factions due to small number of their representatives.

- Party of Labor - Liberal Party of Ukraine
- Bloc of Democratic Parties NEP
- Social Liberal Union SLOn
- Fewer Words
- Unity
- Democratic Party of Ukraine - Democratic Union

==== Kyiv Oblast/City ====
- Leonid Chernovetskyi Bloc (Disbanded itself on September 22, 2011)
  - Christian Liberal Party of Ukraine
  - Christian Democratic Union

==== Crimea ====
- For Yanukovych! (associated with Party of Regions; (only) participated in the 2006 Crimean parliamentary election)
- Solidarity (associated with Social Democratic Party of Ukraine (united))
- Krym

== Ukrainian parties prior to 1991 ==
=== Austria-Hungary ===
- Ukrainian Radical Party (1890–1950, Agrarian socialism)
- Ukrainian Social-Democratic Party (1899-1939)
- Ukrainian National Democratic Party (1899-1919, Democratic Nationalism)
- Russian National Party (1900-1939, Russophilia)

=== Russian Empire ===
- Ukrainian Social Democratic Labour Party (1905–1950, Social democracy)
- Ukrainian Socialist-Revolutionary Party (1917–1950, Socialism)
- Revolutionary Ukrainian Party (1900–1905, Socialism)
- Hromada (1859–1917, Liberalism)
- Brotherhood of Saints Cyril and Methodius (1845–1847, Liberalism)

=== Makhnovshchina ===
- Nabat Confederation of Anarchist Organizations (1918-1921)

=== Ukrainian People's Republic (1917–1921) ===
- Ukrainian Social Democratic Labour Party (1905–1950, Social democracy)
- Ukrainian Socialist-Revolutionary Party (1917–1950, Socialism)
- Ukrainian Communist Party (1920–1925, Marxism)
- Borotbists (1918–1920, Left-wing nationalism)

=== Ukrainian Soviet Socialist Republic (1918–1991) ===
- Communist Party of Ukraine (Soviet Union) (1918–1991)

=== Second Polish Republic ===
- Ukrainian National Democratic Alliance (1925-1939, Christian Democracy)
- Organization of Ukrainian Nationalists (1929-1939, Ukrainian nationalism)

== See also ==
- List of political parties by country
