= 2006 Crimean parliamentary election =

- 26 March 2006
- All 100 seats in the Verkhovna Rada of Crimea; 51 seats needed for a majority
Party	Vote %	Seats	+/–
For Yanukovych!	33.58	44	+38
Soyuz	7.87	10	New
Electoral Bloc of Kunitsyn	7.80	10	+2
KPU	6.76	9	−6
Qurultai-Rukh	6.45	8	New
Tymoshenko Bloc	6.22	8	New
People's Opposition Bloc of Natalia Vitrenko	5.12	7	New
Ne Tak	3.19	4	+1
This lists parties that won seats. See the complete results below.

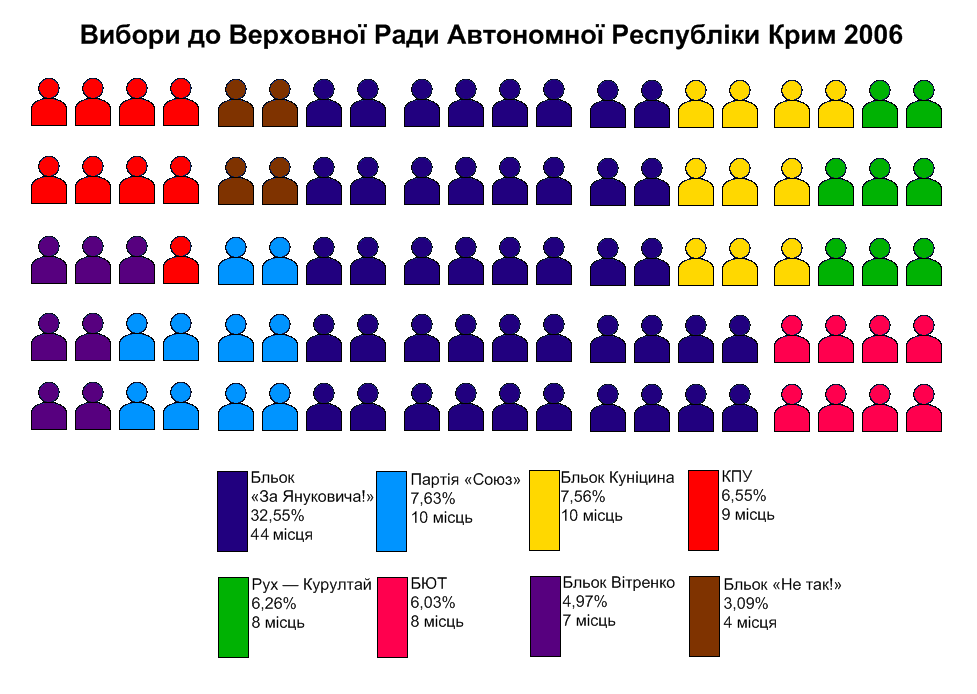

The 2006 Crimean parliamentary election was held on 26 March 2006. These were the first elections to the Verkhovna Rada of Crimea, which were conducted on the proportional election system. In order to gain representation in the Parliament of the Autonomous Republic of Crimea, the party or bloc had to get at least 3% of the vote.

== Results ==
Party	Votes	%	Seats
For Yanukovych!	324,750	33.58	44
Soyuz	76,143	7.87	10
Electoral Bloc of Kunitsyn	75,391	7.80	10
Communist Party of Ukraine	65,357	6.76	9
Qurultai-Rukh	62,416	6.45	8
Yulia Tymoshenko Bloc	60,187	6.22	8
People's Opposition Bloc of Natalia Vitrenko	49,541	5.12	7
Ne Tak	30,839	3.19	4
Lytvyn Bloc	19,120	1.98	0
For Crimea! (SPU–NPV–Vecha)	16,267	1.68	0
Our Crimea (PZV–VChNP)	12,997	1.34	0
Our Ukraine	12,416	1.28	0
Party of Greens of Ukraine	12,145	1.26	0
Communist Party of Workers	11,491	1.19	0
Crimean Tatar Bloc (NRUE–NPVSZ)	10,757	1.11	0
Socialist Party of Ukraine	9,551	0.99	0
Revival	9,516	0.98	0
Lazarenko Bloc (Hromada–SDS–SDP)	8,548	0.88	0
Party of Industrialists and Entrepreneurs of Ukraine	7,855	0.81	0
Reforms and Order Party	6,008	0.62	0
Party of Putin's Politics	5,843	0.60	0
Party of Pensioners of Ukraine	4,634	0.48	0
Green Planet	3,537	0.37	0
State – Labor Union	3,257	0.34	0
PNERU "For Crimea without corruption"	3,089	0.32	0
Bloc of Boris Oleinik and Mikhail Sirota (TPU–IU–PZ)	2,313	0.24	0
Ukrainian National Bloc of Kostenko and Plyushch	2,312	0.24	0
Russian United Bloc (PPMSB–SU)	2,302	0.24	0
Communist Party of Workers and Peasants	2,253	0.23	0
PORA	1,920	0.20	0
Crimean Bloc (ChDPU–ChLPU)	1,911	0.20	0
Christian Democratic Union	1,867	0.19	–
Human Rights Party	1,713	0.18	0
Party of Patriotic Forces of Ukraine	1,589	0.16	0
Ukrainian Republican Party "Sobor"	1,578	0.16	0
Evgeniy Marchuk – Unity (PS–Unity–PSZhU)	1,364	0.14	0
Third Force	1,298	0.13	0
Labour Ukraine	1,287	0.13	0
Union. Chernobyl. Ukraine	1,256	0.13	0
Patriots of Ukraine	1,121	0.12	0
Congress of Ukrainian Nationalists	1,027	0.11	0
Power to the People (VPDP–PZPU)	975	0.10	0
Forward, Ukraine!	935	0.10	0
Ecological Salvation Party	905	0.09	0
New Politics	837	0.09	0
All-Ukrainian Party of People's Trust	681	0.07	0
Ukrainian Conservative Party	472	0.05	0
Against all	33,569	3.47	–
Total	967,140	100.00	100
Valid votes	967,140	96.95	
Invalid/blank votes	30,435	3.05	
Total votes	997,575	100.00	
Registered voters/turnout	1,542,002	64.69	
Source: Politika-Crimea

== 2010 majority coalition ==
On 28 May 2010 a majority coalition was formed between the Party of Regions, the Bloc of Vitrenko, the Soyuz Party, the Social Democratic Party of Ukraine (united), as well as members of the Block of Kunitsin and six independent deputies. Coalition consists of 68 deputies.

Note: The Opposition Electoral bloc "NOT SO!" really represents the Social Democratic Party of Ukraine (united) at the Crimean peninsula. In 2010 the bloc was known as the Solidarity. The People's Movement of Ukraine "Rukh" in Crimea is known as the Kurultai-Rukh. The Kunitsyn's bloc in the council is represented by a deputy faction of "Krym".

By the summer of 2010 the council consisted of 16 members that quit their respective blocs and are considered as independent: For Yanukovych! - 12, BYuT - 3, Vitrenko - 1.
