= People's Control (political party) =

- President: Dobrodomov Dmytro Yevhenovych
- Founded: 2015
- Headquarters: Ukraine; Kyiv
- Ideology: Center-right
- Colours: Red; Gray

Website
- nkontrol.org.ua

People's Control (Civic Movement "People's Control") is a Ukrainian political party led by the Member of Parliament Dobrodomov Dmytro, the former director of the media holding ZIK. It was founded in 2015.

== History ==
The movement emerged in Lviv in 2012 as an initiative by well-known investigative journalist Dobrodomov Dmytro Yevhenovych. Its goal was to expose corrupt officials, dishonest schemes in state and municipal governance, and analyze decisions made in the city and country. Due to significant public resonance, the movement expanded its activities, addressing issues like public transportation, roads, and utilities.

During the Revolution of Dignity, the organization became one of the co-organizers of the Lviv Maidan Committee, providing informational and legal support for citizens and students. At the same time, the movement, along with its coordinator Andriy Mysyk, managed to organize a coordination center and resting space for nearly 10,000 participants in the protests in Kyiv.

After the Maidan's victory and the start of the war in Eastern Ukraine, in cooperation with "People's Self-Defense of Lviv", assistance centers for military personnel were created, operating on a volunteer basis to collect and coordinate supplies for the needs of the Ukrainian army and volunteer battalions.

In 2014, during the parliamentary elections, the leader of the movement Dobrodomov Dmytro Yevhenovych became an MP as an independent candidate. He soon announced the creation of the Civic Movement "People's Control". MPs Andriy Antonishchak, Bohdan Matkivsky, and Oleh Musiy (all BPP) also participated in the party.

Later, the party decided to participate in the local elections on October 25, 2015.

On September 2, 2015, a new inter-factional association "People's Control" was created in the Verkhovna Rada, consisting of Dobrodomov Dmytro Yevhenovych, Oleh Musiy, Bohdan Matkivsky, and Andriy Antonishchak.

The publication Leviy Bereg notes that Dobrodomov's political activity is curated by Deputy Head of the Presidential Administration of Ukraine Vitaliy Kovalyuk. The financial side is possibly sponsored by the main financier of the All-Ukrainian Union "Svoboda" Ihor Krivetsky.

== Regional leaders ==
- Pavlo Danylchuk — Volyn. Deputy of the Lutsk City Council.
- Volodymyr Volovodyuk — Vinnytsia.
- Oleksandr Pinkovsky — Cherkasy.
- Olena Vasylenko — Dnipropetrovsk.
- Svitlana Pakholchuk — Zhytomyr.
- Volodymyr Hergelyuk — Ivano-Frankivsk.
- Serhiy Mykhailyonok — Kirovohrad. Deputy of the Kropyvnytskyi City Council, 6th convocation. Head of the information-analytical center "Pereveslo".
- Valeriy Veremchuk – Lviv. Head of the deputy group in the Lviv City Council.
- Taras Borovsky – Kyiv, human rights activist.
- Dmytro Silman – Rivne.
- Olena Abakumova – Ternopil.
- Oksana Korniychuk – Khmelnytskyi.
- Hryhoriy Vanzuryak – Bukovyna. Head of the Hlybotska District Council. Brother of MP of the 7th convocation Vanzuryak Roman Stepanovych.
- Valeriy Altgause – Kherson.
