= Yuriy Karmazin Bloc =

Yuriy Karmazin Bloc Блок Юрія Кармазіна
- Founded: December 2005
- International affiliation: None

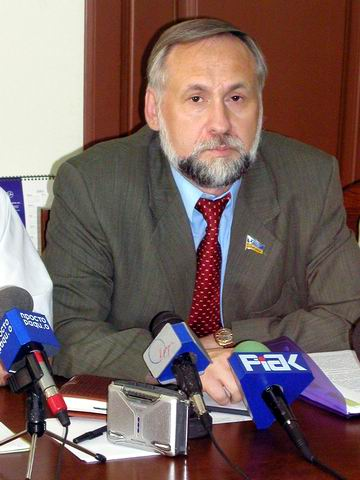
Yuriy Karmazin in May 2002

The Yuriy Karmazin Bloc (Ukrainian: Блок Юрія Кармазіна) was an electoral alliance in Ukraine created in December 2005.

At the 2006 parliamentary elections the alliance won 0,65% of the popular vote and no seats.

The alliance had the following members:

- All-Ukrainian Party of Peace and Unity
- Party of Defenders of Homeland
- Party "National Democratic Union "Ukraine"
