= National-Democratic Association "Ukraine" =

Political party

The National-Democratic Association "Ukraine" (Ukrainian: Партія Національно-демократичне об'єднання Україна, romanized: Partiia Natsionalno-demokratychne obiednannia Ukraina) is a political party in Ukraine registered on September 1, 2000.

The party did not participate in the Ukrainian 2002 parliamentary elections.

In the 2006 elections, the party failed as part of the electoral alliance Yuriy Karmazin Bloc to win parliamentary representation.

In the 2007 elections, the party failed again as part of the All-Ukrainian Community to win parliamentary representation.

In the 2010 local elections National-Democratic Association "Ukraine" won a few seat in city councils in Western Ukraine.

The party did not participate in the 2012 parliamentary elections. And again did not participate in the 2014 Ukrainian parliamentary election.
