= Conscience of Ukraine =

Political party in Ukraine

Conscience of Ukraine (Ukrainian: Совість України) is a political party in Ukraine registered in March 2005.

== Electoral history ==
The party did not participate in the 2006 Ukrainian parliamentary elections, in the 2007 elections, the party failed as part of the All-Ukrainian Community to win parliamentary representation.

During the 2010 Ukrainian local elections the party won representatives in municipalities and did particularly well in Poltava (winning 74% of the votes and it won the Mayoral election with 61% of the votes). But Poltava Mayor Oleksandr Mamay officially joined the ranks of the Party of Regions in July 2012. During the same 2010 elections Volodymyr Groysman was re-elected Mayor of Vinnytsia as a candidate of the party with 77.81% of the votes.

The party did not participate in the 2012 parliamentary elections. Again the party did not participate in the 2014 Ukrainian parliamentary election.

In 2015 Ukrainian local elections Mamay was re-elected (as Mayor) in Poltava as again a candidate of Conscience of Ukraine with 62.9% in a second round of Mayoral election.
