= Yurii Karmazin =

Ukrainian politician and judge (1957–2022)

- Юрій Кармазін
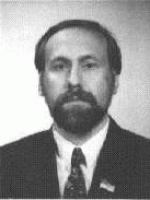

Member of the Verkhovna Rada
- In office 23 November 2007 – 12 December 2012
- In office 11 May 1994 – 25 May 2006

Personal details
- Born: 21 September 1957 Zvenyhorodka, Cherkasy Oblast, Ukrainian SSR, USSR
- Died: 9 November 2022 (aged 65)
- Party: Motherland Defenders Party

Yurii Karmazin (Ukrainian: Юрій Анатолійович Кармазін; 21 September 1957 – 9 November 2022) was a Ukrainian politician and judge. Karmazin served four terms as a People's Deputy of Ukraine.

== Biography ==
Born on 21 September 1957, in Zvenyhorodka, Cherkasy region of Ukrainian SSR. Graduated from Odesa University. In 1982 was appointed prosecutor assistant of Odesa region. From 1985 until 1992 Karmazin worked as a prosecutor of the Prymorskyi district of Odesa. In 1993 he was elected a judge of the Odesa Regional Court, which he stayed for one year.

At the parliamentary elections in 1994 and 1998, he was elected as a People's Deputy (from Districts No. 299 and No. 134). In July 2000 he joined the faction Solidarity.

On 22 May 1999, he was elected as the head of the Motherland Defenders Party. On 31 October of that same year, he participated in the first round of presidential elections. There he was ranked 10th out of 13, gaining 90,793 votes (0.35%).

In the winter of 2000–2001, Karmazin took an active part in the action "Ukraine without Kuchma". In 2002, he was a lawyer of a Russian businessman Konstantin Grigorishin.

At the parliamentary elections on 31 March 2002, Karmazin was listed as number 17 on the "Our Ukraine" Bloc list and was elected to the Ukrainian parliament for the third time.

In 2005, Karmazin said in an interview to the Boulevard newspaper that he was against Prime Minister Viktor Yanukovych, and that he won't live in one country with him. In the same interview, he told how a certain superior force came down on him, giving him instructions for his future activities.

In the 2006 Ukrainian local elections he failed to win a seat in the Odesa City Council (for the Yuriy Karmazin Bloc).

At the parliamentary elections in March 2006, Karmazin headed the nominal electoral bloc Yuriy Karmazin Bloc, but did not pass to the parliament. He also lost the Kyiv mayor elections, taking fourth place with 5.45% of the vote.

On 30 September 2007, Karmazin participated in the 2007 parliamentary elections under the number 58 of the election list of Our Ukraine – People's Self-Defense" parties bloc and was elected a Deputy of the Verkhovna Rada (Ukrainian parliament) for the fourth time.

Karmazin did not participate in elections to the Ukrainian parliament in 2012, as he was refused to be registered. In the 2013 by-election in district No. 94 in Kyiv Oblast he did take part as an independent candidate, but he failed to win.

Karmazin did participate in the 2014 Ukrainian parliamentary election as he headed the list of the party Green Planet. This party gained 0,23% of the vote and no seats.

In November 2015 he joined the leadership of the "Far-right forces" movement, the organizer of an anti-government protest in February 2016, whose headquarters were located in "Kazatsky" hotel. The campaigners demanded the resignation of the government of President Petro Poroshenko and the release of political prisoners, they themselves were accused of destructive and provocative actions, beneficial to Russian media and the Russian authorities. By the end of the month, the protests stopped.

In January 2018, Karmazin held a press conference in which he provided documents that he said confirmed the relationship between ICU company and the American financier, deputy chairman of the inaugural committee of Donald Trump, Elliott Broidy. ICU denied that its company or any of its affiliates had any relationship with Broidy, stating that "Yuri Soloviev is not acquainted with Elliott Broidy and has never had any business dealings with him."

In May 2018, Karmazin proclaimed himself the hetman of all Ukrainian Cossacks.

Karmazin officially became a presidential candidate in February 2019. In the election he gained 0.08% of the vote.

In the 2019 Ukrainian parliamentary election Karmazin failed to get elected in district No. 198 located in Cherkasy Oblast. In this election he gained 4.21% of the votes in the constituency, while winner Serhiy Rudyk won with 28.91%.

Karmazin died on 9 November 2022, at the age of 65.

== Awards ==
- Honored Lawyer of Ukraine (1996).
- Judicial Counsellor III Class
- Honorary Worker of the Prosecutor's Office of Ukraine.
