= All-Ukrainian Community =

Ukrainian electoral bloc

The All-Ukrainian Community (Ukrainian: Всеукраїнська громада) was an electoral bloc in Ukraine. In the 30 September 2007 elections, the bloc failed to win parliamentary representation winning only 0,05% of the votes.

== Member parties ==
The All-Ukrainian Community contains several parties:

- All-Ukrainian Party of Peace and Unity
- National-Democratic Association "Ukraine"
- Conscience of Ukraine
- Political Party of Small and Medium-sized Businesses of Ukraine
