= Electoral Bloc of Kunitsyn =

Political bloc in Crimea, Ukraine

The Electoral Bloc of Kunitsyn (Ukrainian: Блок Куніцина) was a political alliance in Crimea led by Serhiy Kunitsyn.

It consisted of:

- People's Democratic Party (Narodno-Demokratychna Partiya)
- Democratic Party of Ukraine (Demokratychna Partiya Ukrayiny)
- Party of the State Neutrality of Ukraine (Partiya derzhavnoho neitralitetu Ukrayiny)

== Conclusion ==
At the parliamentary election, 26 March 2006, it won 7.63% of the popular vote and 10 seats in the regional parliament.
