= Party of Regions =

Pro-Russian political party in Ukraine

Party of Regions Партія регіонів Партия регионов
- Leader: Collective leadership
- Executive secretary: Borys Kolesnikov
- Founders: Mykola Azarov; Yukhym Zvyahilsky; Volodymyr Rybak
- Founded: 26 October 1997 (28 years, 349 days)
- Banned: 21 February 2023 (3 years, 231 days)
- Succeeded by: Opposition Bloc (mainly); Our Land (partial); Revival (partial)
- Headquarters: Kyiv
- Newspaper: Vremya Regionov
- Youth wing: Young Regions
- Membership (2013): 450,000
- Ideology: Social democracy Regionalism; Russophilia; Euroscepticism; Catch-all party
- Political position: Centre-left
- National affiliation: For United Ukraine! (until 2002)
- European affiliation: Progressive Alliance of Socialists and Democrats (Cooperation, until 2014)
- Oligarch association: Donetsk Clan
- Colours: Blue; White
- Slogan: Strong regions, strong country, rich people! (Russian: «Сильные регионы, крепкая страна, богатые люди!») (Ukrainian: «Сильні регіони, міцна країна, багаті люди!»)
- Verkhovna Rada (2012): 185 / 450 (41%)
- Regions (2010): 1,587 / 3,056 (52%)

Party flag

Website
- partyofregions.ua

The Party of Regions (Ukrainian: Партія регіонів, romanized: Partiia rehioniv, pronounced [ˈpɑrt⁽ʲ⁾ijɐ reɦiˈɔn⁽ʲ⁾iu̯]; Russian: Партия регионов, romanized: Partiya regionov) was a pro-Russian political party in Ukraine formed in late 1997 that was the largest party in Ukraine between 2006 and 2014.

Since the Revolution of Dignity, the party has not competed in elections and members have slowly dispersed; the last election in which the party participated was the 2012 Ukrainian parliamentary election. The best-known former party members are former prime minister Mykola Azarov and former president of Ukraine Viktor Yanukovych; both fled to Russia in February 2014 after Euromaidan.

The Ukrainian Eighth Administrative Court of Appeal banned the party on 21 February 2023.

== History ==
=== Party of Regional Revival of Ukraine ===
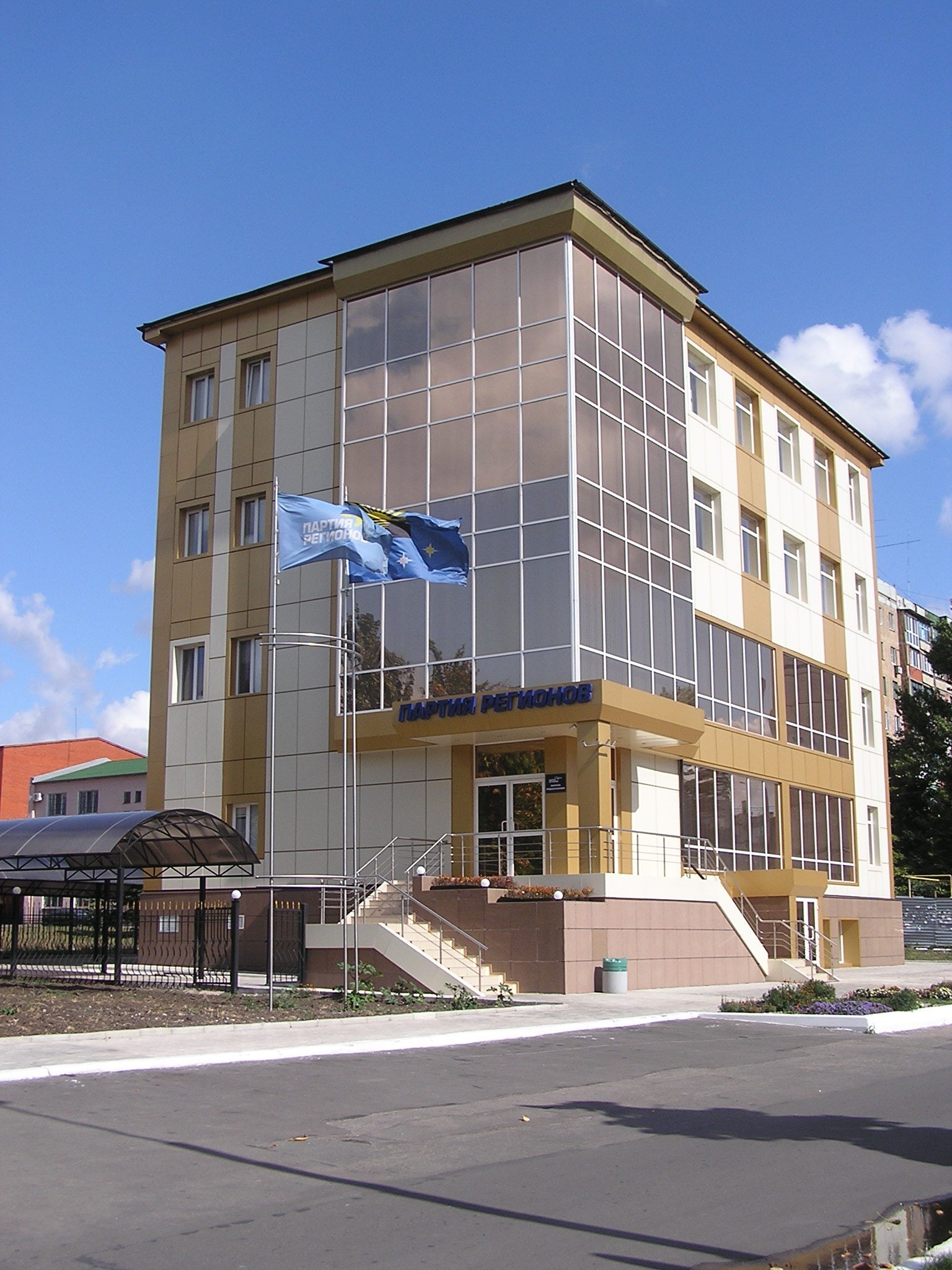
The office of Party of Regions in Makiivka, 2009

The founding congress of the Party of Regional Revival of Ukraine (the predecessor of the Party of Regions) was held on 26 October 1997 in Kyiv. The first leader of the party was mayor of Donetsk, Volodymyr Rybak. On 6 November 1997, the Party of Regional Revival of Ukraine was registered at the Ukrainian Ministry of Justice, and on the 27th of that month the 1st Party Congress took place, which adopted the electoral party list and platform for the next elections. On 13 January 1998, a parliamentary faction was created in the parliament of Ukraine. It was known as the Party of Regional Revival of Ukraine and was headed by Gennadiy Samofalov.

During the 1998 parliamentary elections, the Party of Regional Revival of Ukraine won 0.90% of the votes. A single party representative was elected to the Ukrainian Parliament by winning one constituency in the regular elections. The party was among the top 10 in Chernivtsi and Donetsk Oblasts. Volodymyr Rybak was the winner of constituency number 45 in Donetsk Oblast.

During the 2nd Party Congress that took place in two stages during the spring of 1999, the party decided to support candidate Leonid Kuchma for the next presidential elections. It was recommended that the candidate should include in his election campaign some of the Party of Regional Revival of Ukraine's policy proposals, including one on granting the Russian language official status. In the summer of 1999, the party entered the "Our choice – Leonid Kuchma" electoral bloc, consisting of 23 parties and led by Yevhen Kushnaryov, who endorsed incumbent president Leonid Kuchma in the presidential election of 1999.

=== Creation of the Party of Regions ===
On 17 November 2000, the 3rd Extraordinary Party Congress adopted the merger of five political parties, For Beautiful Ukraine (led by Leonid Chernovetsky), All-Ukrainian Party of Pensioners (A. Kapusta), Party of Labor (Valentyn Landyk), Party of Solidarity of Ukraine (Petro Poroshenko), and Party of Regional Revival of Ukraine (Volodymyr Rybak), into a new one under the name of Party of Regional Revival "Labor Solidarity of Ukraine". The co-leaders of the new political group became Valentyn Landyk, Petro Poroshenko, and Volodymyr Rybak. Also, shortly before the merger, the Party of Solidarity of Ukraine was completely abandoned by one of its key components, the Peasant Party of Ukraine, which dissolved its union with Solidarity. On February 21, 2001, the Ministry of Justice registered the newly established Party of Regional Revival "Labour Solidarity of Ukraine".

On March 3, 2001, at the 3rd Party Congress, the party changed its name to Party of Regions. At the congress Mykola Azarov, who at that time was chairman of the State Tax Administration of Ukraine, was elected the party leader but soon resigned in December 2001. Azarov was replaced by his deputy and at that time Vice Prime Minister Volodymyr Semynozhenko. In an interview with the newspaper Den (Ukrainian: День) on 6 March 2001, Azarov said that he agreed to become the chairman for a brief period "until the party nominated a leader who will claim the office of the President of Ukraine in 2004". In December 2001 the Party of Regions member Ihor Yushchko was appointed Minister of Finance of Ukraine. On 21 March 2001, the Ministry of Justice re-registered the party under the number 939 with the older date of registration.

On 23 May 2001, the party signed an agreement of partnership and cooperation with the party Labour Ukraine (Serhiy Tihipko), and on 7 June 2001, with the Agrarian Party of Ukraine.

"Regions of Ukraine" was the parliamentary wing of the Party of Regions and was created at the end of March 2001 after several deputies defected from their original faction. Critics claimed the deputies were "lured away" from those other factions by pressure, and analysts claimed most of them had nothing to do with the new party. Nine out of seventeen members of the faction had their political and business roots in the Donetsk region. In July 2002 the party had a faction of 24 people (one deputy left the faction later).

On 20 March 2001, Solidarity announced it would "be as a single bloc". Eventually the Solidarity party became part of the Viktor Yushchenko Bloc Our Ukraine during the 2002 parliamentary elections.

During the Ukrainian parliamentary election the party was a member of the For United Ukraine electoral bloc. It was then led by Volodymyr Semynozhenko.

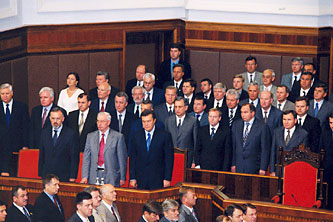
The first government of Viktor Yanukovych

From 21 November 2002 until 7 December 2004, Viktor Yanukovych was Prime Minister of Ukraine. At a congress held on 19 April 2003, Yanukovych was elected party leader, succeeding Semynozhenko. At that time, the party had 20 seats in parliament.

=== Electoral breakthrough ===
The party shifted its political ideology to the left and became much more populist in nature before the 2004 Ukrainian presidential election and, as a result, Yanukovych won over a large part of the Communist party's electorate in eastern Ukraine. The party's stated platform included making Russian a second official language in Ukraine, moving towards a pro-Russian foreign policy, and increasing social spending. It also advocated a regionalist ideology, and many members supported making Ukraine a federation.

The Party of Regions moved into opposition after Viktor Yanukovych, its chosen candidate, lost the 2004 presidential election. Yanukovych first claimed an electoral victory, but strong allegations of electoral fraud triggered a series of events commonly known as the Orange Revolution. In the re-run of the presidential election ordered by the country's Supreme Court, Viktor Yanukovych lost the election to Viktor Yushchenko.

The Party claimed to be a victim of a political persecution campaign organized by the new government, in part because Borys Kolesnykov, the head of the regional party branch and of the Donetsk Oblast Council, was arrested in April 2005 and charged with criminal extortion. The Party of Regions claimed this was an act of political repression, while the authorities believed that Kolesnykov had links to organized crime and his arrest was a purely criminal matter. The Council of Europe called the investigation "in full compliance with European standards". Kolesnykov has since been cleared of charges and released from pre-trial detention.

The party signed a collaboration agreement in 2005 with Russia's "United Russia".

American consultant Paul J. Manafort has advised the party and Yanukovych since 2005.

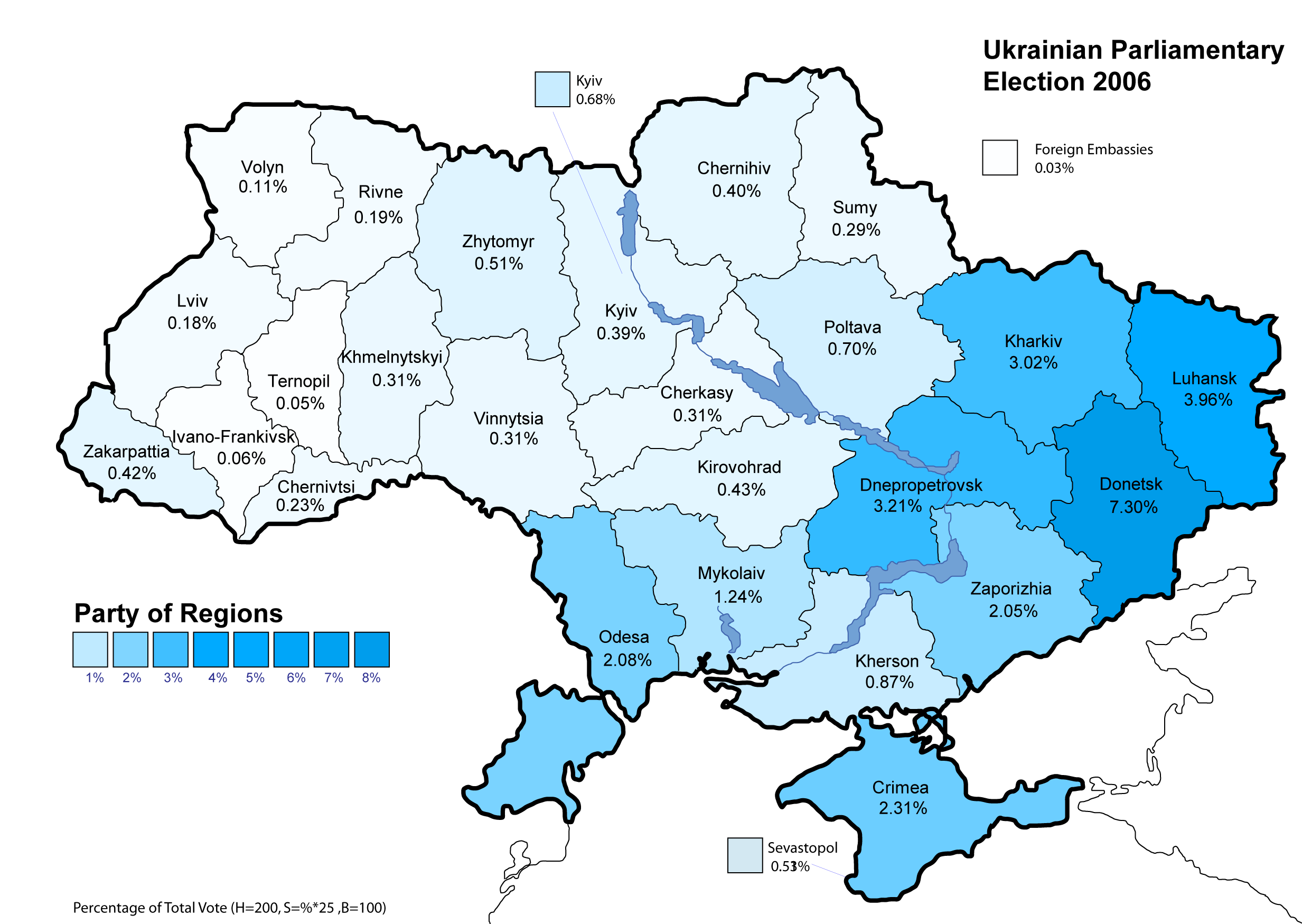
Map showing the results of POR the percentage of total national vote per region for the 2006 parliamentary election.

==== 2006 parliamentary election results ====
In the parliamentary elections held on 26 March 2006, the party gained 32.14% of votes and won 186 (out of 450) seats in the Verkhovna Rada (the Ukrainian Parliament), forming the largest parliamentary group. On 6 July 2006, the Socialist Party of Ukraine abandoned the "Orange Coalition" between Our Ukraine and the Yulia Tymoshenko Bloc following the failure of each bloc to reach agreement on the formation of a governing coalition.

On 10 July 2006, a new parliamentary majority called the "anti-crisis coalition", led by the Party of Regions and including the Socialist Party and the Communist Party, was formed, nominating Viktor Yanukovych to the post of prime minister. The coalition remained in office until the special parliamentary elections held in September 2007.

In the 2006 Crimean parliamentary election, the Party of Regions was part of the For Yanukovych! election bloc.

On 19 January 2007, Yevhen Kushnaryov, a high-ranking member of the Party of Regions, died in Izium as a result of an accidental gunshot wound received while hunting.

In mid-2007, the Ukrainian Republican Party and Labour Ukraine merged into and became part of the Party of Regions.

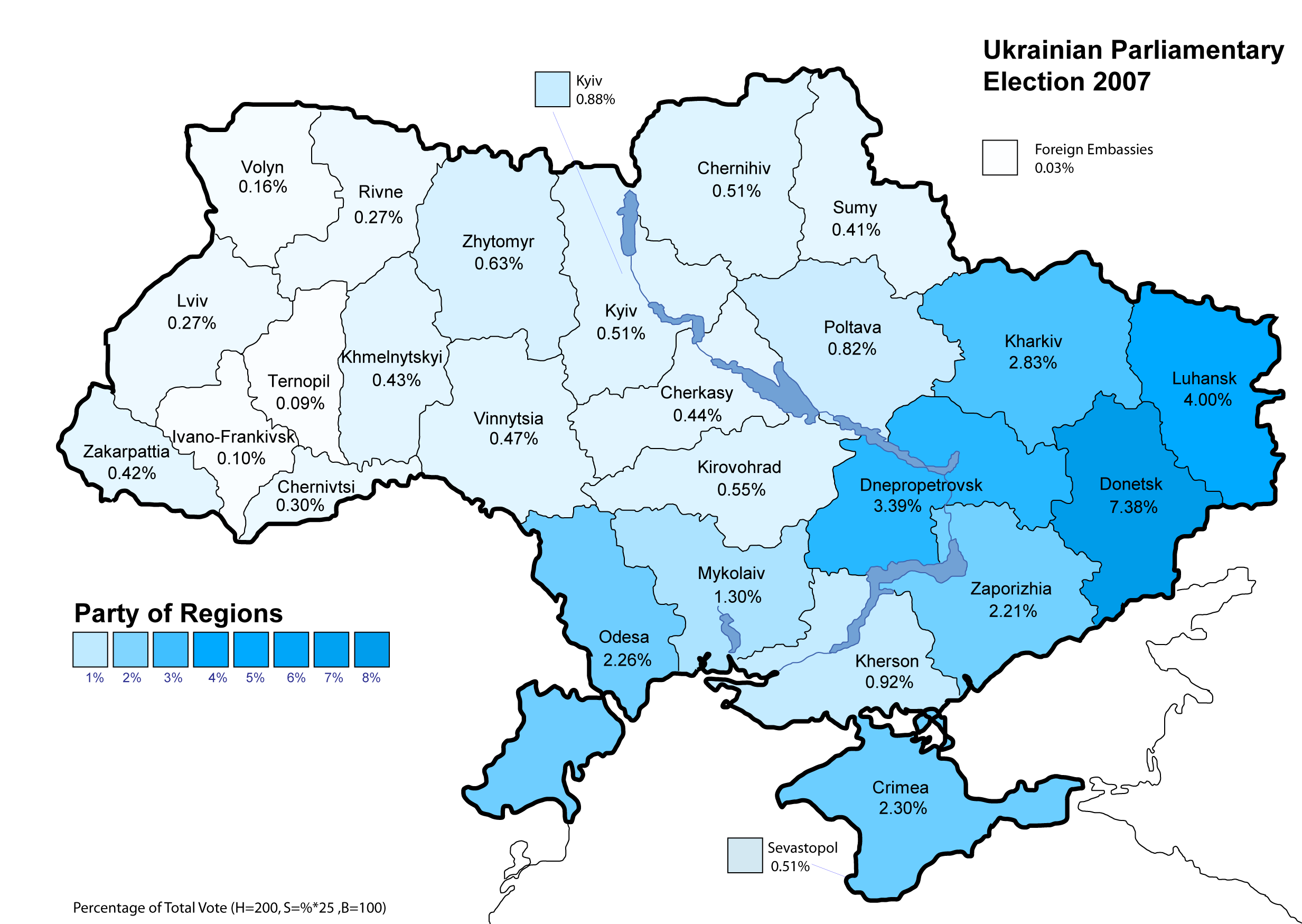
Map showing the results of the Party of Regions (percentage of total national vote) per region for the 2007 parliamentary election.

==== 2007 parliamentary election results ====
In the parliamentary elections held on 30 September 2007, the party won 175 seats (losing 11 seats) out of 450 seats with 34.37% of the total national vote. The party received the highest number of votes, with a swing of +2.23% in comparison to the 2006 vote.

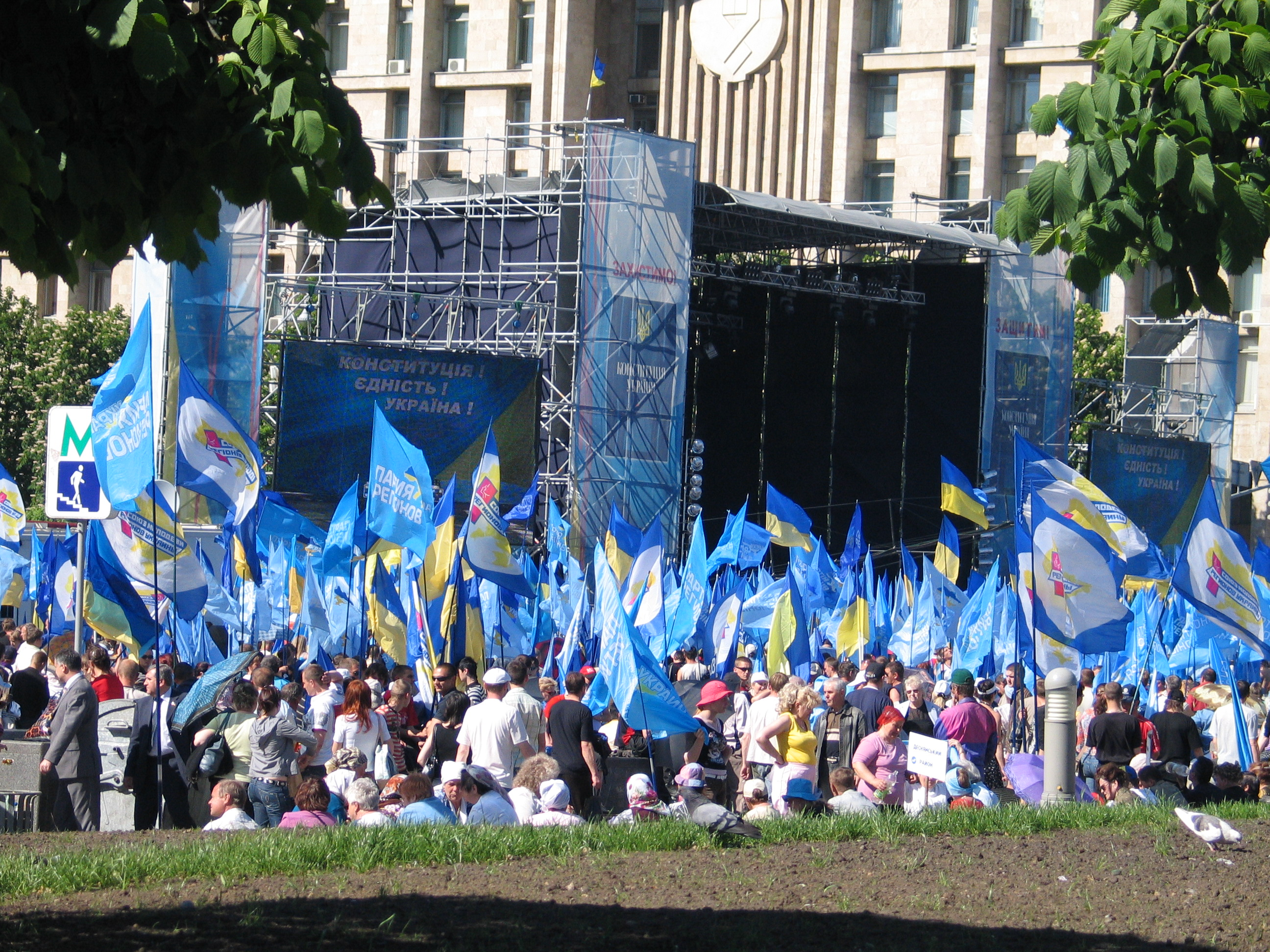
Rally in support of the Party of Regions in Kyiv, 2007

Following the formation of a governing coalition between Our Ukraine and the Yulia Tymoshenko Bloc and the election of Yulia Tymoshenko as prime minister on 18 December 2007, the Party of Regions formed the parliamentary opposition.

On 13 March 2009, Victor Yanukovych stated the Party of Regions was ready to unite into a coalition with its archrivals the Yulia Tymoshenko Bloc (BYuT). He noted: "We are ready to unite, but only on the base of the program on struggle with crisis". The previous day, the deputy leader of the Bloc of Yulia Tymoshenko faction, Andriy Portnov, said that the union of his political force with the Party of Regions was highly improbable, but that it could be possible after the next Ukrainian presidential elections. Prime Minister Yulia Tymoshenko stated on 17 March 2009 that her bloc was ready to join efforts with the Party of Regions to pass certain bills in the Ukrainian parliament (Verkhovna Rada). Tymoshenko said, "You are a representative of the Regions Party, [and] I represent the BYuT. It's time to join efforts for the benefit of the country." On 30 March 2009, Victor Yanukovych stated he did not believe in the possibility of forming a coalition with the Yulia Tymoshenko Bloc in the current parliament. At the same time, he added that "it would be necessary to agree on main issues" concerning amendments to the Constitution of Ukraine involving local self-government reform, judicial reform and clear division of authority among President, government and parliament. According to Yanukovych, talks with the BYuT were still ongoing in late May 2008.

In early June talks to build a national unity government to address the economic crisis collapsed, and Yulia Tymoshenko accused Yanukovych of betrayal, saying: "He unilaterally, without warning anyone, quit the negotiation process, making a loud political statement, killing the merger and the chances for Ukraine."

In September 2009 Member of Parliament Vasyl Kiselev was expelled from the party and the political council of the Party of Regions. Kiselev was expelled "for violation of provisions and demands of the charter of the Party of Regions and harming the reputation of the party."

In September 2009 Mykola Azarov announced the creation of the Anti-Fascist Forum of Ukraine, the chairmen of which were Dmytro Shentsev (member of parliament for Kharkiv) and the head of the Luhansk Region State Administration, Valeriy Holenko.

=== Yanukovych presidency ===
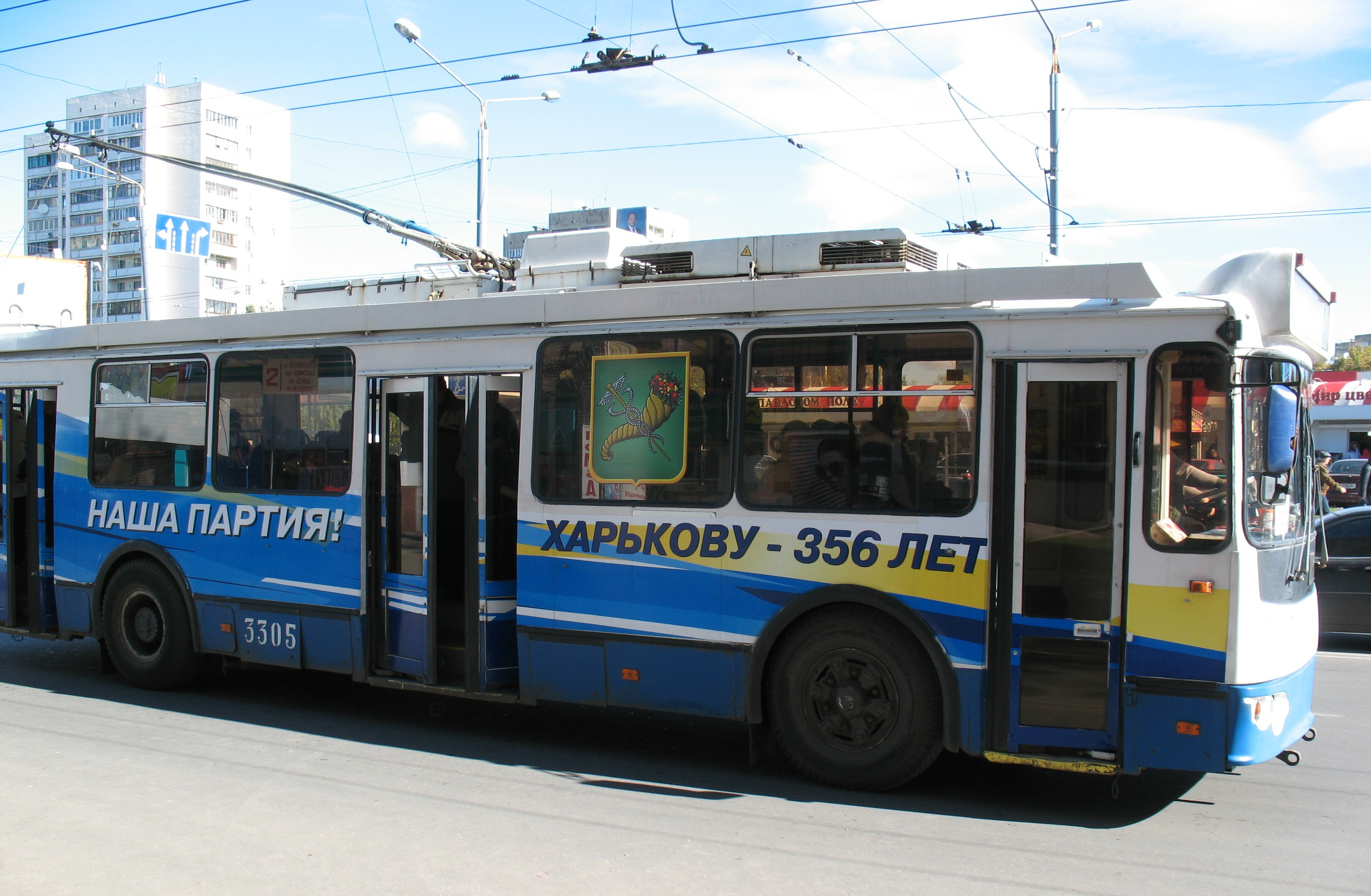
Electoral campaign for the Party of Regions says in Russian "Our Party!" (Kharkiv, 31 October 2010)

The Party of Regions endorsed Viktor Yanukovych as their candidate for the 2010 presidential election. The party intended to create a new coalition in the Verkhovna Rada and form a new government if Yanukovych won the 2010 presidential elections. Yanukovych was elected President of Ukraine on 7 February 2010. On 19 February the Ukrainian parliament terminated the powers of Ukrainian Member of Parliament (MP) Yanukovych, in his place #179 on the electoral list of the Party of Regions at the 2007 early parliamentary elections. Tamara Yehorenko was registered as an MP by the Central Election Commission of Ukraine on 26 February. On 3 March, Ukrainian President Yanukovych suspended his membership in the Party — Yanukovych was barred by the Constitution from heading a political party — and handed over leadership in the party and in the parliamentary faction to Mykola Azarov. Nine days later Azarov handed it to Oleksandr Yefremov. On 11 March 2010, together with Bloc Lytvyn and Communist Party of Ukraine, the party joined the first Azarov Government. The Party of Regions elected Azarov as its new Chairman at its 12th congress on 23 April 2010.

Seven extra deputies (four of whom were Bloc Yulia Tymoshenko (BYuT) members) joined the Party of Regions faction in October 2010. In March 2011 five more former BYuT deputies joined the faction. By late November 2012 the Party of Regions faction consisted of 195 lawmakers (20 more than the 175 elected in September 2007).

During the 2010 Ukrainian local elections, the party won majorities on most regional and city councils as well as most of the mayoralties (except in Western Ukraine), and in the 2010 Crimean parliamentary election (where it won over 70% of the seats). It was the only party that won representatives in all Ukrainian oblasts where elections were held, and it won the most votes in all but four of those oblasts (the four oblasts where it did not were situated in Western Ukraine). In Crimea, particularly in 2010–2014, the Party of Regions was nicknamed "Makedonians" because the Crimean Prime Ministers Vasyl Dzharty and Anatolii Mohyliov were associated with the "Makiivka-Donetsk clan."

In September 2010, the party was planning to sign a memorandum on cooperation with China's Communist Party. On 14 October 2010, the Party of Regions formed a cooperative arrangement with the Socialists and Democrats European parliamentary group.

During Yanukovych's presidency, both he and the Party of Regions were accused of trying to create a "controlled democracy" in Ukraine and of trying to "destroy" the main opposition party BYuT to do so, but both denied those charges.

==== 2012 parliamentary election results ====
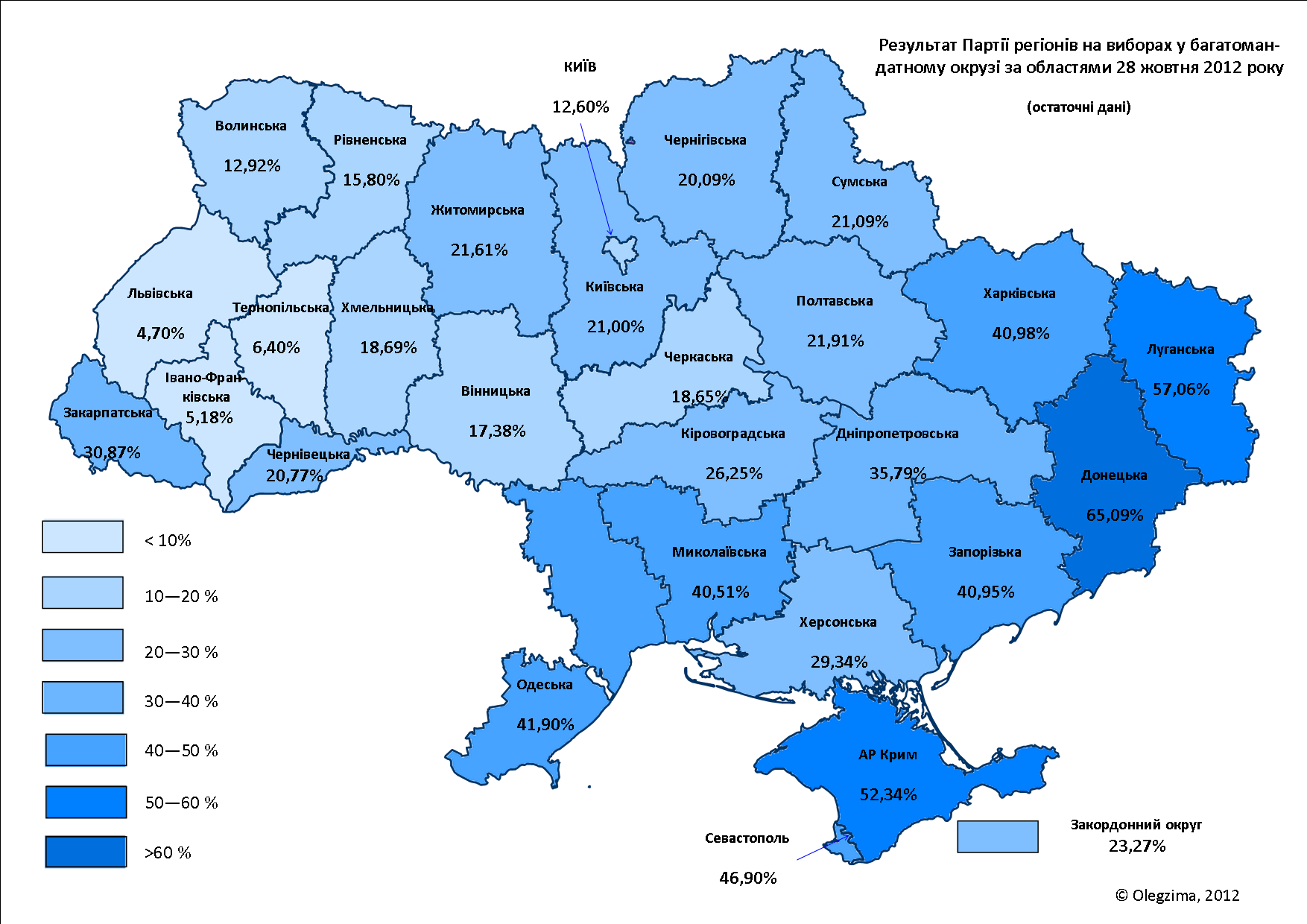
Results in the 2012 elections

In August 2011 Strong Ukraine and People's Party announced that both parties aimed to merge with the Party of Regions. The merger between People's Party and Party of Regions did not materialise, but Strong Ukraine and Party of Regions merged on 17 March 2012. Former Strong Ukraine leader Serhiy Tyhypko was unanimously elected Party of Regions deputy chairman and member of the Party of Regions political council the same day. Party of Regions parliamentarian Olena Bondarenko had stated in early March 2012 that Party of Regions, Strong Ukraine party and "another party" planned to hold a unity congress on 17 March. No additional third party merged with the Party of Regions on 17 March 2012; according to Ukrainian media Tyhypko had personally prevented a merger of United Centre with the Party of Regions in March 2012.

In October 2011 a cooperation agreement was signed in Astana between the Kazakhstani Nur Otan and the Party of Regions.

In late 2011, the party's popularity dropped in opinion polls below 20%, mainly because the party was losing votes to the Communist Party of Ukraine.

In April 2012, the top PR consultancy Burson-Marsteller was hired to represent the interests of the Party of Regions, "to help them communicate its activities as the governing party of Ukraine, as well as to help it explain better its position on the Yulia Tymoshenko case", as explained by Robert Mack, a senior manager at Burson-Marsteller.

In the October 2012 parliamentary elections the party won 72 seats and 30% of the votes under party-list proportional representation (falling from 34% in 2007 and 32% in 2006) and another 115 by winning 115 simple-majority constituencies (it had competed in 204 of the 225 constituencies); this sum gave them a total of 187 seats and 41.56% of the 450 seats in the Ukrainian Parliament. The party had lost about 2 million voters compared with the previous election. On 12 December 2012 the party formed a parliamentary faction of 210 deputies.

At least 18 Party of Regions deputies have criminal ties, according to Hennadiy Moskal, deputy head of Parliament's Committee on Organized Crime and Corruption.

In June 2013, 148 people's deputies of Ukraine signed a letter to the Polish Sejm asking to recognize the Volhynian tragedy as a genocide. A total of 119 of those parliamentarians were members of Party of Regions, while other 23 were from the Communist Party of Ukraine.

=== Post-Yanukovych presidency ===
==== Revolution of Dignity ====
From November 2013, protests against Yanukovych's rule evolved into the largest democratic mass movement in Europe since 1989, known as Euromaidan which led to the Revolution of Dignity. Two main goals of Euromaidan were the removal of President Yanukovych and the calling of snap elections. In late January 2014, the party's symbol and activities were banned in the Chernivtsi, Ternopil, and Ivano-Frankivsk regions, although there was no legal basis for these bans, since in Ukraine only a court can ban the activities of a political force. The Party of Regions faction in Zhytomyr announced its dissolution on 19 February 2014.

On 22 February 2014, the Ukrainian parliament voted for the resolution on self-removal of Viktor Yanukovych, as President of Ukraine. Out of the 38 PoR deputies present, 36 voted in favor of ousting Yanukovych, while two did not take part in the vote. Simultaneously, both Yanukovych and former Prime Minister Mykola Azarov fled to Russia. In a written statement the next day, the party denounced Yanukovych, stating they "strongly condemn the criminal orders that led to human victims, an empty state treasury, huge debts, shame before the eyes of the Ukrainian people and the entire world." On 24 February 2014, faction leader Oleksandr Yefremov declared that the party was moving into the opposition. 77 of its MPs had left the faction in the preceding days. On 25 February 2014, Anatoliy Kinakh and 32 other mostly former PoR deputies created the parliamentary faction Economic Development.

On 28 March 2014, Yanukovych asked the Party of Regions to exclude him. The next day, at a party congress, the party nominated Mykhailo Dobkin as its presidential candidate for the 2014 Ukrainian presidential election. The congress expelled many former leaders from the party including Yanukovych, Azarov, former First Deputy Prime Minister Serhiy Arbuzov, ex-chairman of the Ministry of Revenue and Duties Olexander Klimenko, former Energy Minister Eduard Stavitskyi, ex-governor of the Donetsk region Andrew Shishatskiy, and Valery Konovalyuk. On 7 April 2014, the political council of the party also expelled Sergiy Tigipko, Oleh Tsariov, and Yuriy Boiko from the party.

Mykhailo Dobkin was the Party of Regions' candidate in the snap presidential election of 25 May 2014, and received only 3 percent of the vote.

On 3 June 2014, another twenty Party of Regions deputies left the party's parliamentary faction. Including this change, the faction's strength was reduced from 210 deputies (at its highest point on 12 December 2012) to 80 deputies by 6 June 2014. As a result, it became the second biggest faction in parliament after the 85 member-strong Batkivshchyna faction. On 2 July 2014, the 32 member-strong new parliamentary faction For Peace and Stability, composed mostly of former Party of Regions MPs, was formed. In the following months many former members of the Party of Regions became objects of the so-called "trash bucket challenge", where Ukrainian officials dumped images of the former PoR members into garbage bins and other trash containers.

==== Criminal case against deputies/party members support for separatism ====
On September 17, 2014, amidst the ongoing war in Donbas, a group of 24 people's deputies of Ukraine from the Party of Regions and the Communist Party of Ukraine met with Sergey Naryshkin, the chairman of the Russian State Duma. On September 25, 2014, the Central Investigation Administration of the Ukrainian Ministry of Internal Affairs opened a criminal case against those deputies, charging them with infringement on the territorial integrity of Ukraine.

The Ukrainian press claimed that during the days around the February 2014 Ukrainian revolution, several party members called for the disintegration of Ukraine and for a union with the Russian Federation. News outlets claimed that Oleksandr Yefremov, leader of the Ukrainian parliamentary faction, was in full support of these proposed actions, and that Vladimir Konstantinov, chairman of the Supreme Council of the Autonomous Republic of Crimea went to Luhansk to support these actions.

==== 2014 parliamentary election, disintegration and ban ====
On 14 September 2014, the Party of Regions officially announced their choice not to participate in the 2014 parliamentary elections; the party deemed the election as lacking legitimacy because the residents of the Donbas could not vote in the election. Many individual members of Party of Regions ended up as candidates of the Opposition Bloc. As of 2026, the Party of Regions has not participated in elections since the 2012 Ukrainian parliamentary election.

By the summer of 2015, most representatives of the party in 2014 had become members of Opposition Bloc, Revival or Our Land. Others continued their political careers in other parties (mostly Petro Poroshenko Bloc). According to Ukrainian media research from February 2016, 22% of the Petro Poroshenko Bloc representatives in regional councils and 12% of the party's parliamentary deputies were former members of the Party of Regions. In the 2020 local elections, former Party of Regions members ran mainly as candidates of the Opposition Platform — For Life, Opposition Bloc, Kernes Bloc — Successful Kharkiv, Trust Deeds and Servant of the People parties.

Following the 2014 annexation of Crimea by Russia and Vladimir Konstantinov's announcement that the Party of Regions Crimean branch would be reorganized, many of its members joined the United Russia party. Officially — according to the TASS news agency and Konstantinov — there is no succession of the United Russia Crimean branch from the Party of Regions Crimean branch, but according to several local news resources from Sevastopol, the transfer was in fact organized by former activists of the Party of Regions and Russian Unity.

As of July 2019, the Party of Regions' former website redirected to “Golos Pravdy”, a pro-Russia blog website which the Atlantic Council considers to be linked to Fancy Bear and which is run by politicians that fled Ukraine in 2014.

After the Russian invasion of Ukraine in 2022, many former members of the Party of Regions supported the Russian side. A number of city leaders in Russian-occupied territories were accused of collaboration and high treason for their cooperation with the Armed Forces of the Russian Federation. For instance, Galina Danilchenko, a deputy in Melitopol who was part of the Party of Regions and the Opposition Bloc, was proclaimed by the Russians as “acting mayor of the city” on 12 March 2022 with support from the Russian army. The mayor of Melitopol, Ivan Fedorov, had been arrested by the Russian military the previous day. In Kupiansk, mayor Gennady Matsegora of the Opposition Platform — For Life party voluntarily surrendered the city to the Russian armed forces. Many former members of the Party of Regions on the ground were also appointed by Russian troops as heads of civil administrations in the occupied territories.

On 21 February 2023, the Eighth Administrative Court of Appeal banned the Party of Regions. This ban was initiated by the Ministry of Justice and the Security Service of Ukraine. Because of the Russo-Ukrainian War (leading to loss of Ukrainian government control in parts of the country), no local elections have been held in some areas since the 2010 Ukrainian local elections; as such, the Party of Regions deputies in those territories still have their mandate.

== Election results ==
Verkhovna Rada
Year	Party-list			Constituency / total	Overall seats won	Seat change	Government
Year	Popular vote	%	Seats / total	Constituency / total	Overall seats won	Seat change	Government
1998	241,262	0.94%	0/225	2/220	2 / 450	New	minority support
2002	For United Ukraine bloc		6/225	25/225	31 / 450	▲29	coalition government
2006	8,148,745	32.78%	186/450	—N/a	186 / 450	▲155	coalition government
2007	8,013,895	34.94%	175/450	—N/a	175 / 450	▼11	opposition
2012	6,116,746	30.00%	72/225	113/220	185 / 450	▲10	government
2014	No participation	0%	0/225	0/198	0 / 450	▼185	extra parliamentary

Presidency of Ukraine
Election year	Candidate	First Round		Second Round		Result
Election year	Candidate	# of overall votes	% of overall vote	# of overall votes	% of overall vote	Result
1999	Leonid Kuchma	9,598,672	37.99	15,870,722	57.70	Won
2004	Viktor Yanukovych	11,008,731	40.47	12,848,528	44.85	Lost
2010	Viktor Yanukovych	8,686,642	35.92	12,481,266	49.55	Won
2014	Mykhailo Dobkin	546,138	3.07	—N/a		Lost

Date	Party leader
1997–2001	Volodymyr Rybak
2001–2002	Mykola Azarov
2002–2003	Volodymyr Semynozhenko
2003–2010	Viktor Yanukovych
2010–2014	Mykola Azarov

== Issue stances ==
The Party of Regions has been described as center-left or left-leaning. The party is associated with other left-wing parties such as Volodymyr Lytvyn's People's Party and the Communist Party of Ukraine. All three parties have combined a pro-Russian orientation with populist, redistributive policies.

In 2011, the party asserted it had a pragmatic approach to Ukrainian EU membership and the country's foreign economic interests; it said it supported "[walking] the path of European integration and the implementation of respective standards in the social and economic spheres". Yet, given the European financial crisis at the time, the party saw the issue of Ukraine's accession to the EU as "purely theoretical."

The party accepts Ukrainian as the only state language in Ukraine, but also claims to promote "both the development of the state Ukrainian language and languages of other nationalities residing on the territory of Ukraine".

The Party of Regions supports the cancellation of a number of benefits for deputies of the Ukrainian parliament. Leading party members have stated the party "would mercilessly expel corrupt officials from its ranks".

In November 2013 Party of Regions MP Oleh Tsariov demanded a criminal investigation into the activities of the United States Department of State-led TechCamp in Ukraine because he believed it was engaged in "preparations for inciting a civil war" because during training "instructors share their experience of Internet technologies, which are aimed at shaping public opinion and enhancing the protest potential and which were used to organize street protests in Libya, Egypt, Tunisia and Syria".

The Party of Regions lost much of its policy influence amid the 2014 revolution in Ukraine. 72 deputies left the party; the remaining deputies either supported key opposition demands like impeaching Yanukovich, firing Zakharchenko and the General Prosecutor or did not vote.

On 23 February 2014, the party faction of Verkhovna Rada published a statement blaming everything wrong on "Yanukovych and his inner circle", accusing him in particular of giving out "criminal orders", and lamenting that the whole party had been "in effect hostage of one corrupt family".

On 7 April 2014, the party presented its new economic doctrine, which consisted of policies including setting minimal taxes and fees, maximum investor protection, increasing investment attractiveness, deregulation and simplification of licensing procedures, the establishment of a transparent tax system and tax cuts, decreasing the inspections of small and medium-sized businesses, maintaining a 15-year preferential tax system in agriculture, the introduction of effective direct subsidies to farmers to compete on the world market, and a compensation of 50% of new fixed assets in crop.

=== Political program ===
==== European integration ====
On the question of European integration, different views exist within the party. On the one hand, President Viktor Yanukovych, who was a member of the party, has repeatedly underlined his pro-European stances. On the other hand, experts have described the Party of Regions as eurosceptic. The Party's official stance is for increased European integration, but within a framework that is favorable to Ukraine.

==== Domestic policy ====
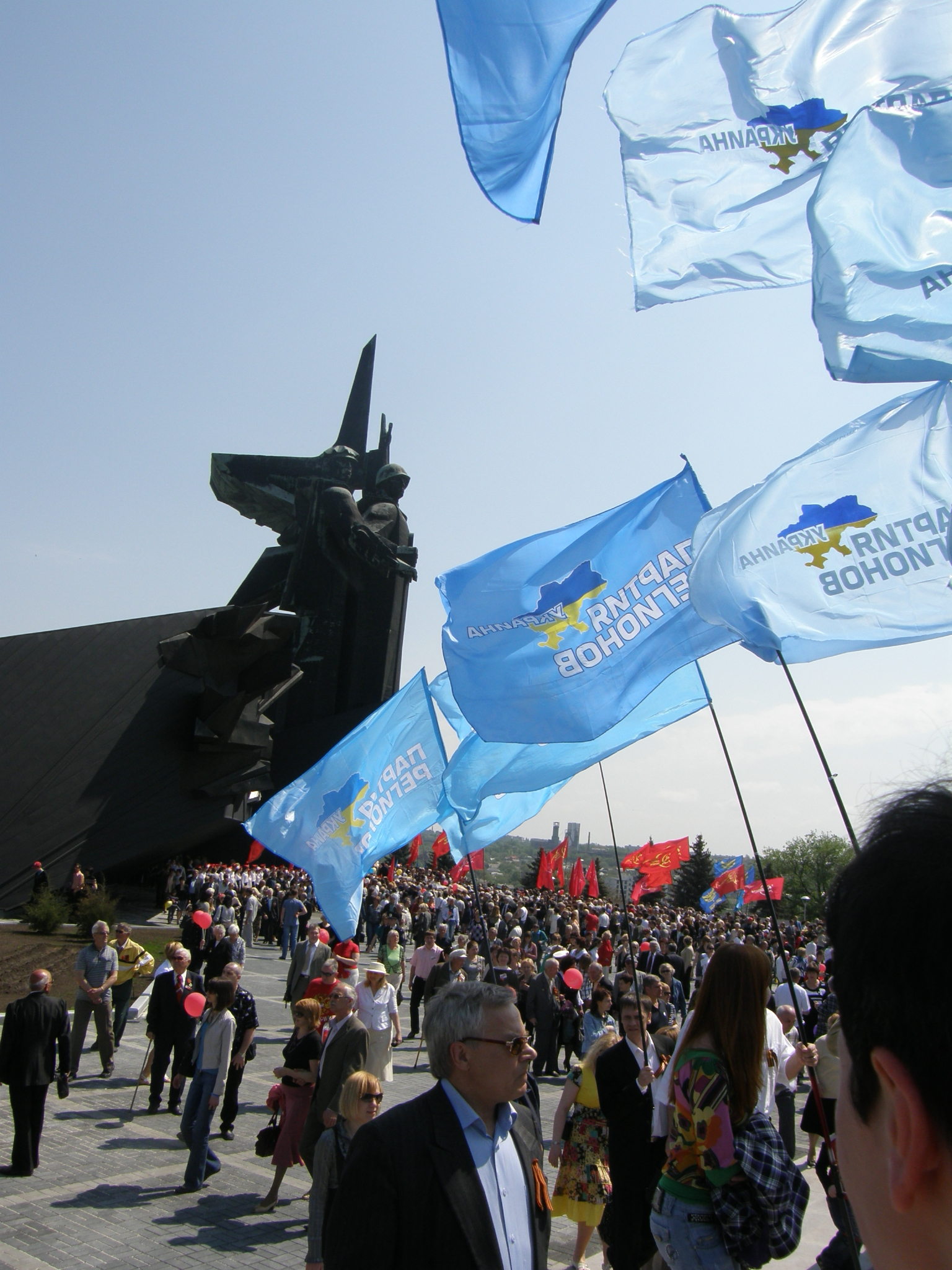
Party of Regions flags in Donetsk, 2010

The party supports policies including affordable housing funded through state mortgages with a 3% annual percentage rate, social contracts with employers, financial aid for newborns, perinatal centers in each region, and the upgrading of maternity homes.

The party supports plans for at least 75 percent placement in higher-educational institutions, a minimum-wage student stipend, a minimum 20-percent annual raise in educator salaries, and universal Internet access. In labor issues, the party supports fully subsidizing employers of the disabled, orphans, single mothers, and workers over age 50; training the unemployed for occupations with labor shortages; providing internships to students; giving young professionals their first job; and a median salary of ₴8,000 by 2017.

The party supports a median salary of ₴8,000 for physicians and ₴5,500 for other medical personnel, reducing basic-medicine prices by 30 percent, providing access to medicines to patients with cancer, heart disease, tuberculosis, and HIV/AIDS, mobile medical facilities in all rural areas, treatment, and rehabilitation for people with limited physical abilities and new pools, stadiums, ice arenas, and sports fields in all regions.

The party supports comfortable, affordable housing; security for senior citizens; the repayment of all deposits in the Sberbank of the USSR up to ₴5,000 by 2017; a minimum pension of 20 percent over the poverty threshold, and significant pension increases for military and law-enforcement personnel. In the environmental sector, the party supports the completion of the Shelter Project for the Chornobyl Nuclear Power Plant by 2015, as well as the installation of 20,000 centralized water-purification systems and recycling plants in each region.

==== National economy ====
Economically, the Party of Regions' core policy proposals are a gradual reduction of corporate income tax, the introduction of tax holidays for IT and innovation projects, and an increase in affordable bank loans for domestic manufacturers. In the energy sector, the Party of Regions advocates: increasing the extraction of domestic coal, oil, and shale gas; developing the shelf gas fields; enhancing the use of solar, wind, and hydropower; and modernizing power plants so they can efficiently use domestic coal and other fuel sources. The Party of Regions also has a rural focus, with proposed policies including the creation of 1,500 agricultural cooperatives, the construction of new crop storage sites, government-set prices for land and rent. In addition to a rural emphasis, the Party of Regions' infrastructure policy also includes: the construction of more modern automobile roads; a new speed rail link between the capital and regions; more affordable aviation transportation; the construction and redevelopment of airports, seaports and rail stations; and the development of more metro stations and commuter rail links.

==== Government and society ====
The Party of Regions' stated civil policy priorities include intellectual freedom, freedom of speech, equal opportunities for women and men in all spheres of life, and granting the Russian language the status of the second state language (while maintaining legislative support for Ukrainian).

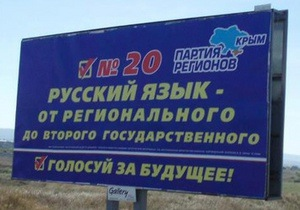
Billboard of the Party of Regions in the Crimea

The Party also emphasizes regional policies, such as an increase in local government power and a shift of the state budget towards funding local councils and their initiatives. The Party promotes the idea of a Ukrainian shift towards a contract army with an abolition of compulsory conscription.

== Selected members ==
- Mykola Azarov – Chairman
- Oleksandr Yefremov – Deputy Chairman of the Party of Regions on Relations with the Parliament of Ukraine
- Petro Pysarchuk

== Vremya Regionov ==
The Party of Regions published a nationwide weekly newspaper (Russian: "Время Регионов", romanized: Vremya Regionov, lit. 'Time of the Regions'). The newspaper was published in Kyiv from 24 August 2008. It was released (on Thursdays) in Ukrainian and Russian online.

== International cooperation ==
The party has previously had international cooperation agreements with the following parties:

- Russia: United Russia
- EU: Progressive Alliance of Socialists and Democrats
- Kazakhstan: Nur Otan
- Azerbaijan: New Azerbaijan Party
- Armenia: Republican Party of Armenia and Prosperous Armenia
- Kyrgyzstan: Ar-Namys
- Cyprus: Progressive Party of Working People
- Poland: Democratic Left Alliance
- China: Chinese Communist Party
- Vietnam: Communist Party of Vietnam

== See also ==
- Viktor Yanukovych
- Rinat Akhmetov
- Yevhen Kushnaryov
- Alliance of National Unity
- 2006 Ukrainian political crisis
- 2007 Ukrainian political crisis
- 2008 Ukrainian political crisis
- Opposition Bloc
- Opposition Bloc (2019)
- Opposition Platform — For Life
- Politics of Ukraine
