= For Yanukovych! =

Political alliance in Crimea, Ukraine

"For Yanukovych!" (Ukrainian: За Януковича!, Russian: За Януковича!) was a political alliance in Crimea (an autonomous republic within Ukraine) between the Party of Regions and the Russian Bloc during the 2006 Crimean parliamentary election.

At the election the alliance won 32.55% of the popular vote and 44 seats out of the 100 seats in the Verkhovna Rada of Crimea (more the 3 times as much as any other contender). However, according to opinion polls, from then its ratings did fall. After the elections members of the alliance tried to remove the speaker of the Verkhovna Rada of Crimea Anatoliy Hrytsenko also a member of For Yanukovych!

In the 2010 Crimean parliamentary election the Party of Regions and the Russian Bloc run separately. The Party of Regions won 80 seats during the 2010 election; the Russian Bloc none.
