= European Solidarity =

Political party in Ukraine

European Solidarity Європейська солідарність
- Abbreviation: ЄС; YeS
- Leader: Petro Poroshenko
- Founder: Petro Poroshenko
- Founded: 5 May 2000
- Split from: Social Democratic Party of Ukraine (united)
- Headquarters: Kyiv
- Membership (2020): "Tens of thousands" (Note: According to the party.)
- Ideology: Liberal conservatism Christian democracy National Democracy; Anti-corruption; Pro-Europeanism
- Political position: Centre-right
- European affiliation: European People's Party (associate)
- International affiliation: International Democracy Union
- Colours: Blue; Yellow
- Slogan: Time to Unite
- Verkhovna Rada: 26 / 450
- Regions: 3,906 / 43,122

Website
- eurosolidarity.org

European Solidarity (Ukrainian: Європейська солідарність, romanized: Yevropeiska solidarnist [jeu̯roˈpɛjsʲkɐ sol⁽ʲ⁾iˈdɑrn⁽ʲ⁾isʲtʲ], ЄС or YeS) is a political party in Ukraine. It has its roots in a parliamentary group called Solidarity dating from 2000 and has existed since in various forms as a political outlet for Petro Poroshenko. The party with its then name Petro Poroshenko Bloc won 132 of the 423 contested seats in the 2014 Ukrainian parliamentary election, more than any other party.

In August 2015, the Ukrainian Democratic Alliance for Reform (UDAR) merged into the party. In May 2019, the UDAR undid this merge. In October 2017, the party had about 30,000 members; former members of Party of Regions are denied membership. In the 2019 Ukrainian parliamentary election, the party won 23 seats on the nationwide party list and 2 constituency seats.

Initially formed as a social democratic party, it shifted to the centre-right during the formation of Petro Poroshenko Bloc in 2014. Since then, it has been described as Christian democratic, liberal conservative, conservative, liberal, and civic nationalist. Regarding their foreign stances, they support the membership of Ukraine in the European Union and a peaceful end to the Russo-Ukrainian War. In its program, they stated their support for decentralisation and anti-corruption among other principles.

== History ==
=== Solidarity (2000–2013) ===
The party started in 2000 as a parliamentary faction called "Solidarity", set up by Petro Poroshenko, until then a member of the Social Democratic Party of Ukraine (united) faction. Taras Kuzio claims that this happened with the help of then President Kuchma, who allegedly wanted to limit the influence of the SDPU(u). Many deputies elected in 1998 for the Peasant Party of Ukraine and Hromada joined the new parliamentary faction. Based on his parliamentary faction Poroshenko eventually established the Party of Ukraine's Solidarity. In 2000 that party merged into what would become the Party of Regions (later to become for a period the biggest party of Ukraine) and Poroshenko became a Party of Regions deputy.

In 2001, Poroshenko expressed interest in the creation of the Our Ukraine Bloc. However, in order to receive quote in Our Ukraine he had to join the bloc with his whole party. The Party of Ukraine's Solidarity failed to break away from the Party of Regions, therefore Poroshenko decided to create a new phantom party with a similar name, the party "Solidarity". At the 2002 parliamentary elections Solidarity was able to join Our Ukraine. Top party members who received a parliamentary mandate on party list of the Our Ukraine electoral bloc in 2002 were Volodymyr Plyutynsky, Volodymyr Makeyenko, Eduard Matviychuk, Anatoliy Korchynsky, while a single constituency in Vinnytsia Oblast was won by Petro Poroshenko.

After 2002, Solidarity stopped participating in elections. In 2004, the party left Our Ukraine, and was represented by 23 deputies in the Verkhovna Rada (the forming of new factions whose parties were not directly elected into parliament was not unique in Ukraine at the time.) In March 2013 the Ministry of Justice asked the Central Election Commission of Ukraine for evidence that Solidarity had not been involved in elections since 2003.

On 17 June 2013, Fatherland member of parliament Yuriy Stets became head of the party. Stets was a member of the united opposition's political council.

On 16 October 2013, a court cancelled the registration certificate of Solidarity. The party could have challenged this on appeal, but did not and was legally eliminated on 31 December 2013 "due to lack of reporting". and because for more than 10 years had not participated in any election.

=== Petro Poroshenko Bloc (2014–2019) ===
"Solidarity" Petro Poroshenko Bloc logo

Early in 2014, Poroshenko became leader of the National Alliance of freedom and Ukrainian patriotism "OFFENSIVE", which was renamed "All-Ukrainian Union Solidarity". By doing so, Poroshenko de facto prolonged the life of Solidarity and de facto merged the National Alliance of freedom and Ukrainian patriotism "OFFENSIVE" into Solidarity (legally the original party "Solidarity" does not exist anymore). National Alliance of freedom and Ukrainian patriotism "OFFENSIVE" was registered in May 2000 under the name All-Ukrainian Party of Peace and Unity (Ukrainian: Всеукраїнська партія миру i єдності, HPEM). It was not allowed to participate in the electoral alliance "Rainbow" in the Ukrainian 2002 parliamentary elections. In the 2006 elections, the party failed as part of the electoral alliance Yuriy Karmazin Bloc to win parliamentary representation. In the 2007 elections, the party failed again as part of the All-Ukrainian Community to win parliamentary representation. After this election (the party) "All-Ukrainian Party of Peace and Unity" was renamed National Alliance of Freedom and Ukrainian patriotism "OFFENSIVE". National Alliance of freedom and Ukrainian patriotism "OFFENSIVE" did not participate in the 2012 parliamentary elections.

In May and June 2014, Ukrainska Pravda characterised the party ("All-Ukrainian Union Solidarity") as "a myth with no website, unknown phone numbers and non existing addresses". At the 2014 presidential election, Poroshenko was elected President of Ukraine.

During a 27 August 2014 party congress, the "All-Ukrainian Union Solidarity" changed its name to "Bloc of Petro Poroshenko" (Ukrainian: Блок Петра Порошенка, Blok Petra Poroshenka), and elected the former Minister of Internal Affairs, Yuriy Lutsenko, as the new leader of the party.

On 2 September, Vitali Klitschko, then parliamentary leader of the Ukrainian Democratic Alliance for Reform, stated that since his party and the Petro Poroshenko Bloc had agreed to joint participation in parliamentary elections on 29 March 2014, the two parties were in discussion about running a joint list at the October 26 parliamentary election. On 15 September it became clear that 30% of the Petro Poroshenko Bloc election list would be filled by members of UDAR and that UDAR leader Klitschko was at the top of this list; Klitschko vowed not to resign as incumbent Mayor of Kyiv, but on 21 November he gave up his seat in the new parliament. According to political scientist Tadeusz A. Olszański (in mid-September 2014) this deal with UDAR "enables it to use that party's large-scale structures, which the Poroshenko Bloc itself lacks".

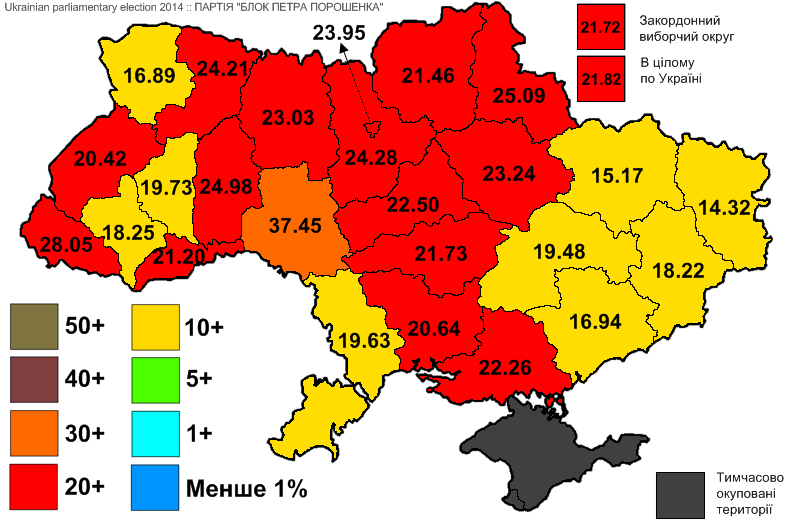
Party support (% of the votes cast) in different regions of Ukraine (in the 2014 parliamentary election)

The party won the parliamentary election with 132 seats, beating the runner-up People's Front, who won 82 seats. People's Front was first in the nationwide party vote (22.14% against 21.81%) but the party won 69 constituency seats while People's Front won only 18. On 27 November 2014, the party formed a parliamentary faction of 145 people (at the opening session of the new parliament).

Top 10 politicians on the party list to the Ukrainian parliament: 1. Vitaliy Klychko, 2. Yuriy Lutsenko, 3. Olha Bohomolets, 4. Volodymyr Hroysman, 5. Mustafa Dzhemilev, 6. Yuliy Mamchur, 7. Maria Matios, 8. Mykola Tomenko, 9. Iryna Herashchenko, 10. Vitaliy Kovalchuk.

On 21 November 2014, the party became a member of the coalition supporting the second Yatsenyuk government and endorsed nine new ministers for the government.

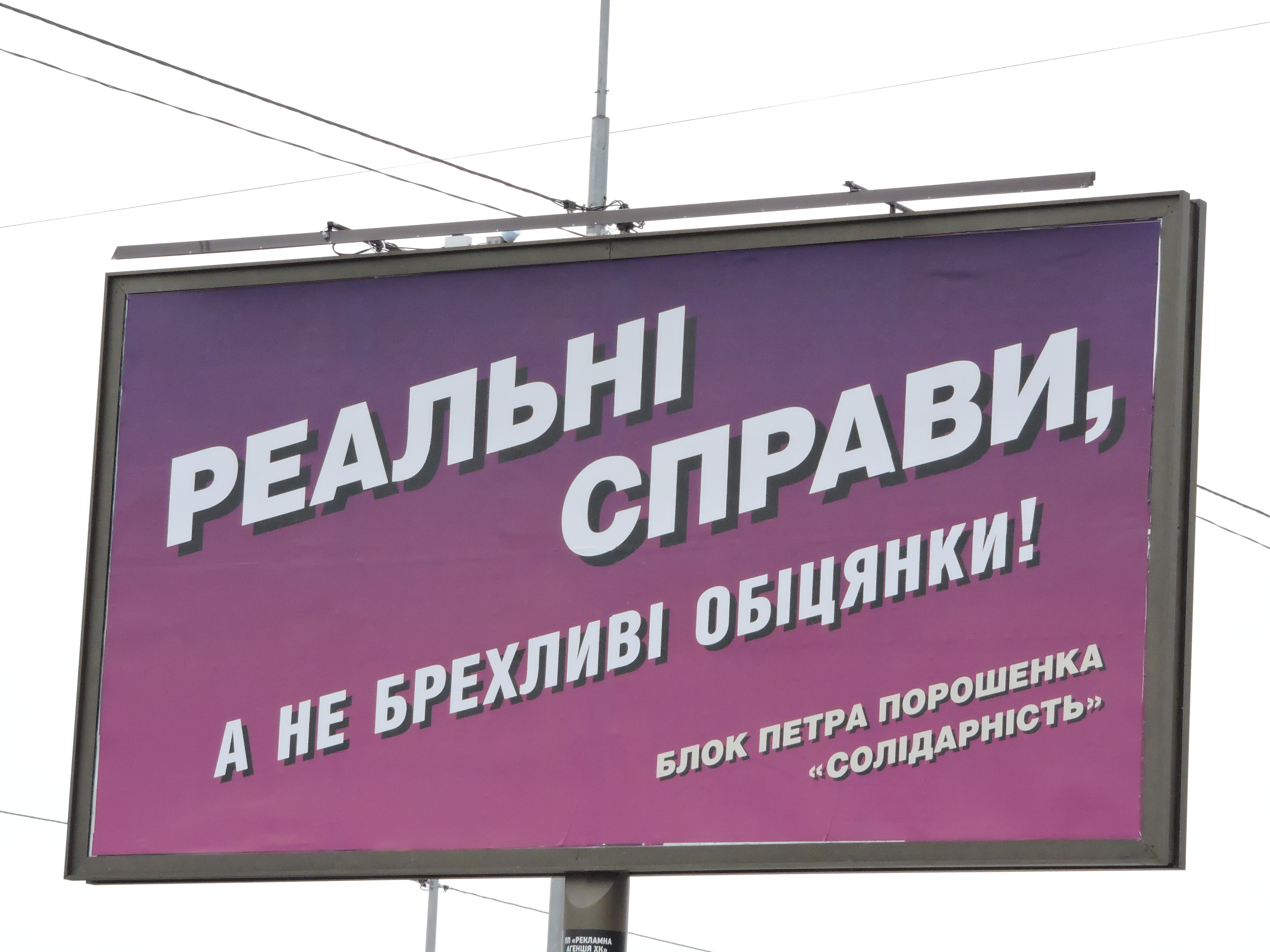
"Real change, not false promises" – a Petro Poroshenko Bloc billboard in Saltivka

In March 2015, "Solidarity" was added to the name "Bloc of Petro Poroshenko". On 28 August 2015 UDAR and Petro Poroshenko Bloc officially merged into Petro Poroshenko Bloc. UDAR party leader Vitali Klitschko became so the new party leader.

The party was one of the winners of the 2015 Ukrainian local elections. It did well in West and central Ukraine and Kherson Oblast region.

According to Ukrainian media research of February 2016 22% of the parties' representatives in regional councils and 12% of the parties' parliamentary deputies were former members of the Party of Regions.

Following the fall of the second Yatsenyuk government, the party joined the coalition that supports the 14 April 2016 installed Groysman Government. In the weeks prior to this 11 MPs had switched to the faction making forming the coalition possible.

Klitschko resigned as Petro Poroshenko Bloc chairman (on 26 May) after a new law barring him as head of the Kyiv City State Administration to be chairman or a member of a political party took effect on 1 May 2016.

On 18 May 2019, Klitschko announced that UDAR would take part in the 2019 Ukrainian parliamentary election autonomously.

=== European Solidarity (from 2019) ===
Results of the 2019 elections

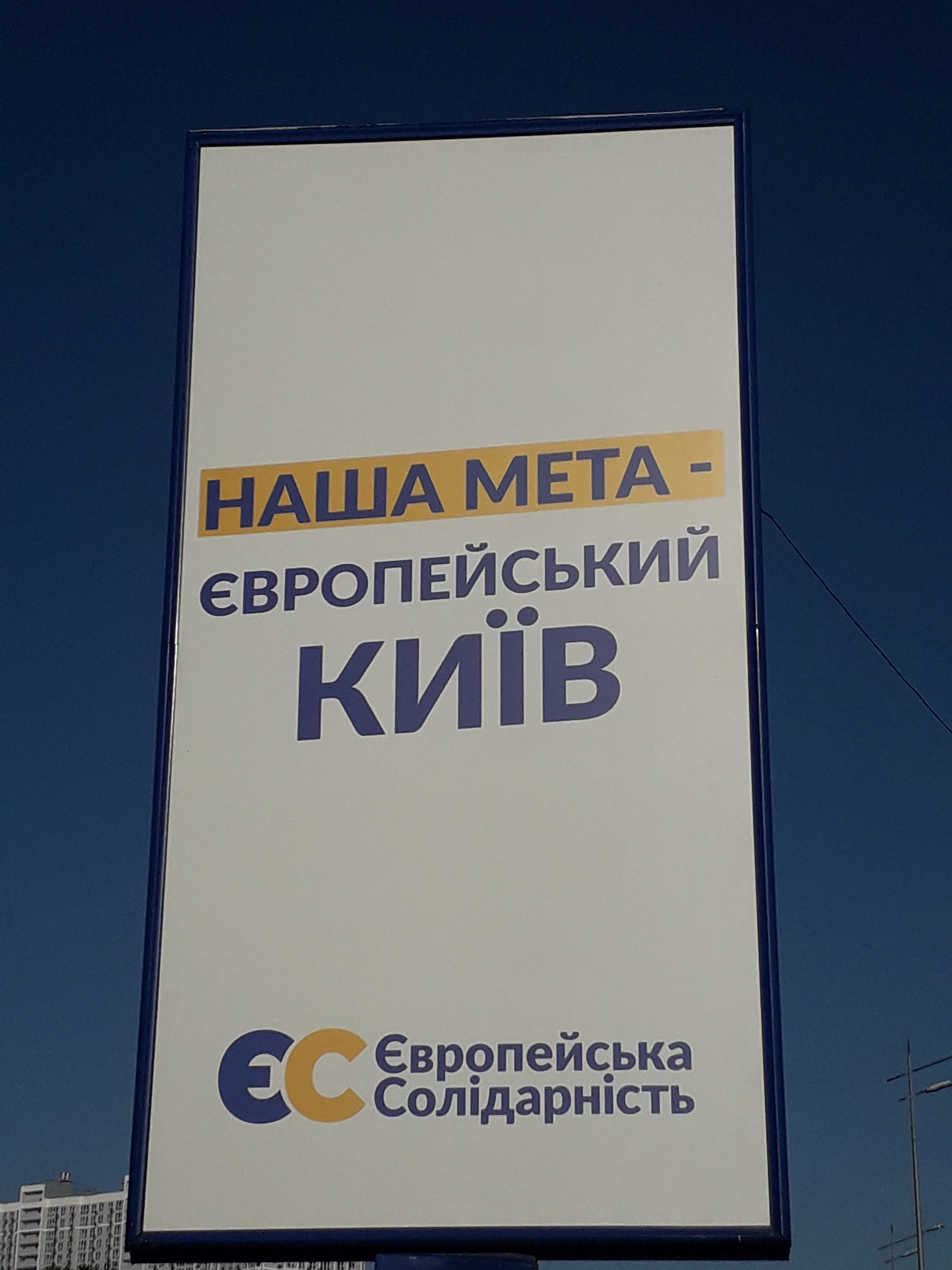
European Solidarity poster in 2020. The text reads "our goal is a European Kyiv".

The party changed its name to its current form on 24 May 2019. According to party leader Poroshenko this had to be done in order to bring in a new leadership of the party and to win the 2019 Ukrainian parliamentary election.

Top 10 politicians on the party list to the Ukrainian parliament in these elections were 1. Petro Poroshenko, 2. Andriy Parubiy, 3. Iryna Herashchenko, 4. Mykhailo Zabrodskyi, 5. Sofia Fedyna, 6. Mustafa Dzhemilev, 7. Yana Zinkevych, 8. Oleh Synyutka, 9. Akhtem Chyihoz, 10. Ivanna Klympush-Tsintsadze.

In the 2019 parliamentary election, European Solidarity scored badly, dropping to 8.10% of votes and electing 23 MPs (37% of which were women) on the nationwide party list and winning 2 constituency seats. The party voted against the confidence vote in the new Honcharuk Government.

In June 2020, former Secretary of the National Security and Defense Council during Poroshenko's presidency Oleksandr Turchynov became head of the 2020 Ukrainian local elections headquarters of the party. In this election European Solidarity did well in West and central Ukraine and it significantly improved on its 2019 parliamentary election result in all Ukrainian oblasts. 3,543 people won seats in local councils on behalf of the party, that is about 10.73% of the available seats.

== Ideology and positions ==
The party officially decries populism and advocates for pragmatism and realism. According to Oleg Varfolomeyev of the Eurasia Daily Monitor the party is a liberal party (and UDAR was as well). According to Bohdan Butkevych of The Ukrainian Week, the party does not have an ideological unity. Due to the fact the party was created shortly before the 2014 Ukrainian parliamentary election and then its "party list was drawn up by taking almost anyone who was ready and willing to invest their own resources". Hence, its parliamentary faction consists of people who "have very different interests, methods of getting into parliament and plans". (Hence) the party's MPs tend not to vote alike.

The party broadly reflects Poroshenko's ideology. On 27 August 2014, newly elected party leader Yuriy Lutsenko stated that the Petro Poroshenko Bloc should help Poroshenko implement his election promises. Official party positions include:

- Open list elections
- Decentralization
- Creating a public television network
- Bringing attention to the plight of the Crimean Tatars
- Enforcing Ukrainian as the sole official language
- Membership of Ukraine in the European Union
- Welfare and social protection for poor citizens
- Law enforcement reform and creation of an independent judiciary
- Ending corruption
- Ensuring Ukraine's territorial integrity
- Energy independence for Ukraine
- Abolishing the immunity of senior officials
- Privatizing all Ukrainian coal mines and liquidate or mothball all mines that cannot be privatized, with social support for the workers of the liquidated or mothballed mines and the population of these territories
- Legislation to restrict religions whose leadership reside in aggressor states, e.g. Russia.

== Party leaders ==
Solidarity

Date	Party leader
2001–2001	Mykhailo Antonyuk
2001–2002	Petro Poroshenko
2013	Yuriy Stets

All-Ukrainian Party of Peace and Unity/National Alliance of freedom and Ukrainian patriotism "OFFENSIVE"

Date	Party leader
2000–????	Lyudmyla Yankovska
2013–????	Ivanenko Yuriyovych, Sekel Mikhailovich, Yuri Khorlikov

Petro Poroshenko Bloc

Date	Party leader
2014–2015	Yuriy Lutsenko
2015–2019	Vitali Klitschko

European Solidarity

Date	Party leader
since 2019	Petro Poroshenko

== Election results ==
Election results for Solidarity, All-Ukrainian Party of Peace and Unity, Petro Poroshenko Bloc and European Solidarity political party.

=== Verkhovna Rada ===
Solidarity

Election	Party leader	Performance					Rank	Government
Election	Party leader	Votes	%	± pp	Seats	+/–	Rank	Government
2002	Petro Poroshenko	6,108,088	23.57% (Our Ukraine Bloc)	New	5 / 450	New	New	Opposition

All-Ukrainian Party of Peace and Unity

Election	Party leader	Performance					Rank	Government
Election	Party leader	Votes	%	± pp	Seats	+/–	Rank	Government
2006	Yurii Karmazin	165,881	0.65% (Yuriy Karmazin Bloc)	New	0 / 450	▼5	▼13th	Extra-parliamentary
2007	Lydia Porechkina	12,327	0.05% (All-Ukrainian Community)	▼0.60	0 / 450	0	▼19th	Extra-parliamentary

Petro Poroshenko Bloc

Election	Party leader	Performance					Rank	Government
Election	Party leader	Votes	%	± pp	Seats	+/–	Rank	Government
2014	Yuri Lutsenko	3,437,521	21.82%	New	132 / 450	▲132	▲1st	Coalition government

European Solidarity

Election	Party leader	Performance					Rank	Government
Election	Party leader	Votes	%	± pp	Seats	+/–	Rank	Government
2019	Petro Poroshenko	1,184,620	8.10%	▼13.72	25 / 450	▼107	▼4th	Opposition

=== Presidential elections ===
Election	Candidate	First round		Second round		Result
Election	Candidate	Votes	%	Votes	%	Result
2014	Petro Poroshenko	9,857,308	54.70%			Elected ✓
2019	Petro Poroshenko	3,014,609	15.95%	4,522,450	24.45%	Lost ✗

=== Local councils ===
Election	Performance				Rank
Election	%	± pp	Seats	+/–	Rank
2015	5.61%	New	8,764 / 158,399	New	2nd
2020	9.21%	▲3.60	3,906 / 43,122	▼4858	6th
