= Political Party of Small and Medium-sized Businesses of Ukraine =

Political party in Ukraine

The Political Party of Small and Medium-sized Businesses of Ukraine (Ukrainian: Політична партія малого і середнього бізнесу, romanized: Politychna partiia maloho i serednoho biznesu) is a political party in Ukraine registered on April 1, 1999.

In the Ukrainian 2002 parliamentary elections the party failed as part of the electoral alliance "Against All" to win parliamentary representation.

The party did not participate in the 2006 elections.

In the 2007 elections, the party failed again as part of the All-Ukrainian Community to win parliamentary representation. In the 2012 Ukrainian parliamentary election the party competed in/for 2 constituencies (seats); but it won in none and thus missed parliamentary representation. The party did not participate in the 2014 Ukrainian parliamentary election.
