= Motherland Defenders Party =

Political party in Ukraine

Motherland Defenders Party Партія захисників Вітчизни
- Founded: 1997
- Headquarters: Kyiv
- Colours: Raspberry
- Verkhovna Rada: 0 / 450

Website
- karmazin.org.ua

The Motherland Defenders Party (Ukrainian: Партія захисників Вітчизни, romanized: Partiia zakhysnykiv Vitchyzny) is a political party in Ukraine registered in July 1997.

== Election results ==
The party ran independent in the 1998 Ukrainian parliamentary elections in which it won 0.30% of the votes and no seats. During his presidential bid in 1999, party leader Yuriy Karmazin complained about the "Jewish-controlled media". The party did not participate in the 2002 parliamentary elections.

At the 2006 parliamentary elections the party was part of the Yuriy Karmazin Bloc alliance that won 0,65% of the popular vote and no seats.

In the parliamentary elections on 30 September 2007, the party was part of the Our Ukraine–People's Self-Defense Bloc alliance, that won 72 out of 450 seats.

In the 2010 local elections the party won 1 representative in the regional parliaments of the Lviv Oblast.

In the October 2012 parliamentary elections party leader Yuriy Karmazin registration was refused by the Central Election Commission of Ukraine (it stated it had received two applications to be a candidate in two different single-mandate constituencies) and thus the party decided not to recognize the elections.

The party did not participate in the 2014 Ukrainian parliamentary election.
