= Kateryna Soliar =

Ukrainian journalist, television presenter (born 1987)

- Катерина Соляр
- Born: Kateryna Valeriivna Solovykh; 8 May 1987 (age 39); Zhovti Vody, Dnipropetrovsk Oblast, Ukrainian SSR, Soviet Union
- Citizenship: Ukraine
- Occupations: Journalist; television presenter; videoblogger

Kateryna Valeriivna Soliar (Note: According to the official Romanization of Ukrainian language. Also spelled Kateryna Valeriyivna Solyar) (née Solovykh; Ukrainian: Катерина Валеріївна Соляр, born 8 May 1987) is a Ukrainian journalist, TV presenter, vlogger and radio presenter. Since 2020, she has been working on 24 Kanal, Radio MAXIMUM and Lux FM. She gained some prominence online thanks to statements about the civic position of the singer from Ukraine Svitlana Loboda on the 24 Kanal during the Russian invasion of Ukraine.

== Biography ==
She graduated from the East European University of Economics and Management.

From 2014 to 2015, she worked as a correspondent and radio presenter at Kyiv 98 FM.

From 2015 to 2017, she was a journalist, and later the TV presenter of the morning program "Ranok po-Kyivskyi".

Since 2020, she has been working on 24 Kanal. Host of the author's project "Burning" (Підгорає) and "Such cases" (Такі справи) and also a co-host of the "Cross-examination" (Перехресний допит) program. She has interviewed Oleksii Arestovych, Evgeny Chichvarkin, Kira Rudyk, Mykhailo Podoliak, and Oleksiy Honcharenko.

Signed against the participation of pro-Russian TV announcers in the "United News" telethon.

In addition to working on television, she runs her own YouTube channel.
