= Misanthropic Division =

International Ukraine-based neo-Nazi group

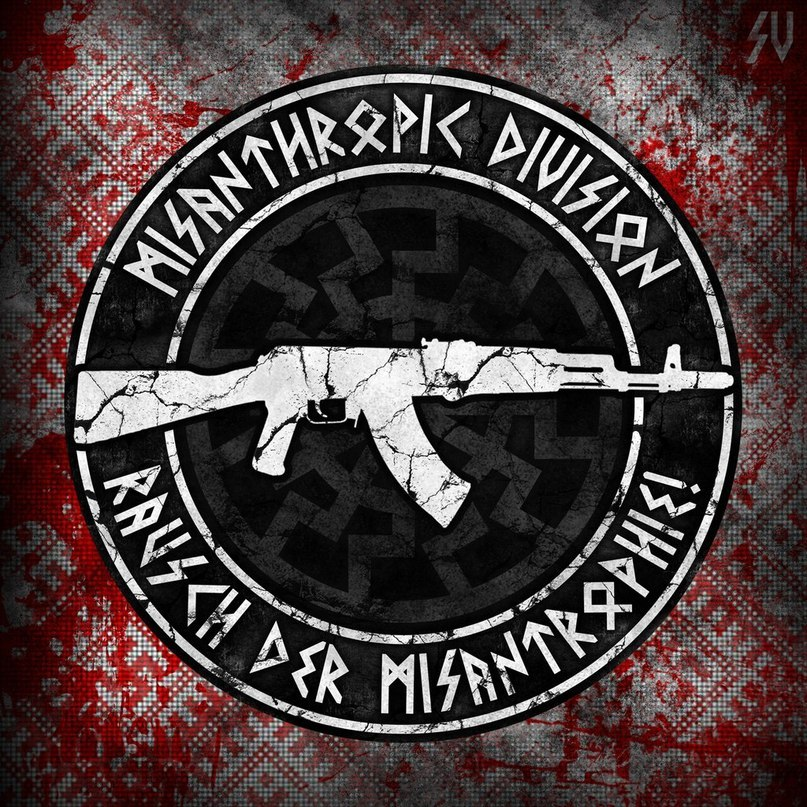
- Emblem of the Misanthropic Division
- Founded: 2014
- Country: Ukraine
- Size: 500–600 (2016)
- Nickname: Phoenix
- Motto: "Töten für Wotan" (Killing for Odin)
- Engagements: Euromaidan; 2014 Odesa clashes; War in Donbas; Russian Invasion of Ukraine
- Website: http://misanthropicdivision.com/

Insignia
- Flag

The Misanthropic Division (Ukrainian: Мізантропік Дівіжн, romanized: Mizantropik divizhn), also known as Phoenix since 2016, is an international neo-Nazi group based in Ukraine which has been described as a paramilitary organization, or as a movement. They originated in 2014 to take part in the Euromaidan protests against the government of Viktor Yanukovych, with some members later fighting alongside the Azov Battalion and UAF in the Donbas region against Russian-backed separatists. Chapters of the group have also been reported to exist in other countries. According to researcher Natalia Yudina, it is not a centralized organization, and it has neither a rigid structure nor permanent leaders.

According to Stanford University's Mapping Militants Project, the group had disavowed militant activities by 2021 but remained active on social media. As of 2022 the status of the group is unclear, according to The Intercept, which states "It's hard to tell how real it is, and how sizeable."

== History ==
=== Revolution of Dignity ===
The group formally originated on 31 October 2014 in Kyiv to participate in the Revolution of Dignity protests under the auspices of the Social-National Assembly, although it had already started to organize by 2013. While they participated in the 1 December 2013 Revolution of Dignity riots in Kyiv city, they simultaneously took part in conflicts in Kharkiv and Odesa. During the unrest in Kharkiv in 2014, which escalated into armed clashes, they claimed responsibility for the killing of two pro-Russian opponents. The Kyiv Post reported in 2015 that the Misanthropic Division had been created as an informal group by Russian fighters serving in the Right Sector's military unit.

=== Russo-Ukrainian War ===
After the war began in eastern Ukraine, some members of the group participated on the Ukrainian side, the group having ties to the Azov Battalion. In October 2016, people claiming to belong to the group claimed responsibility for the killing of separatist Spartan Battalion leader Arsen Pavlov, in a video released from Donetsk Oblast. However, the leadership of the group denied responsibility and accused a man by the name of Dima Kravtsov, a member of the Chernihiv Company, of faking the video.

==== Russian invasion of Ukraine ====
After the beginning of the 2022 Russian invasion of Ukraine, the Misanthropic Division advertised on Telegram for foreign volunteers to join them "for victory and Valhalla". The Intercept reported that the Ukrainian International Legion mourned a combat casualty on Facebook of a French volunteer who appeared to be connected to the Misanthropic Division, who was also mourned by the Misanthropic Division Telegram channel. In reporting this The Intercept detailed a number of uncertainties about the current nature of the Misanthropic Division – including the extent of its association with the Azov regiment, its size, and "how real it is". The author wrote "It may be that the Misanthropic Division is not a real-world unit with a leader and a chain of command so much as a twisted military clique that anyone online can claim".

=== Other activities ===
Flag of the Misanthropic Division movement, with their motto "Töten für Wotan" (Killing for Odin) and two Totenköpfe

Ukrainian news site Zaxid.net claimed in 2016 that the Misanthropic Division possesses around 500–600 supporters in Ukraine, about 1/3 of whom were actively participating in combat in Donbas. The group has also developed branches in several other countries, including Germany, Czech Republic, Spain, Portugal, the United States, and Belarus.

Inside Ukraine, as of 2016 there are ties with the Azov Regiment, but relations with the Right Sector have decayed over time, with the Misanthropic division accusing them of "Jewish collaborationism". Euromaidan Press reports that they have also criticized them for accepting Crimean Tatars, which they declare to be "racially alien elements" to Ukraine. They have additionally maintained close connections to other far-right organizations globally, including the German Third Way party, the Italian CasaPound, and the British National Action.

According to Russian think tank the SOVA Center, in early 2016 the group announced its termination, but then later in August it announced its revival. SOVA reported that by 2017 there were "several autonomous organizations and cells" behind the Misanthropic Division brand.

The Misanthropic Division was classified by Russia as an extremist group in 2015, and in 2016 it was reported that a member of the group had been charged in Russia, and that searches were being conducted on other members of the group.

They have claimed responsibility for multiple clashes with LGBT activists in the city of Lviv.

In October 2019, a new political party named "Society for the Future" was created from the group S14. According to the co-founder this party was a project of several groups from Ukraine, including "Phoenix".

== Ideology ==
According to Stanford University's Mapping Militants Project, the Misanthropic Division is a nihilistic neo-Nazi paramilitary organization with similar ideological views to the Azov movement. According to the group's leadership, the end goal of the group is Ukraine's complete independence from both Russia and the European Union. The group published a 14-point statement in 2015, stating that their goals were foremost the defense of Ukraine in the Anti-terrorist Operation Zone and the defense of the European race, as well as promoting neo-Paganism and rejection of Abrahamic belief. They have, however, also criticized certain neo-Pagan groups and movements for opposing all political violence.

== See also ==
- Far-right politics in Ukraine
- Neo-Nazism § Ukraine
