= Bolshaya Sadovaya Street =

Bolshaya Sadovaya Street (Russian: Большая Садовая улица) may refer to the following streets in Russia:

- Bolshaya Sadovaya Street (Moscow)
- Bolshaya Sadovaya Street (Rostov-on-Don)
- Bolshaya Sadovaya Street (Saratov)

== See also ==
- Sadovaya Street (disambiguation)
