= Sadova =

Sadova may refer to:

== Place name ==
- Sadová, a village in the Czech Republic
- Sadová (Brno), part of Brno, Czech Republic
- Sadova, Călărași, a commune in Călărași district, Moldova
- Sadova, Dolj, a commune in Dolj County, Romania
- Sadova (river), a river in Suceava County, Romania
- Sadova, Suceava, a commune in Suceava County, Romania

== Surname ==
- Feminine form of the surnames Sadov (Russian) or Sadovyi (Ukrainian)
  - Kateryna Kit-Sadova, Ukrainian politician and businesswoman
  - Natalya Sadova, Russian discus thrower
