= Sadovaya Street (disambiguation) =

Sadovaya Street is a street in St. Petersburg, Russia.

Sadovaya Street (Russian: Садовая улица, Garden Street) may also refer to the following streets in Russia:

- Sadovaya Street (Arkhangelsk)
- Sadovaya Street (Ryazan)
- Sadovaya Street (Samara)
- Sadovaya Street (Tarusa)

== See also ==
- Bolshaya Sadovaya Street (disambiguation)
- Sadova
- Garden Street
- Commons:Category:Sadova streets in Ukraine
