= Orchard Road (disambiguation) =

Orchard Road or Orchard Street may refer to:

== Roads ==
- Orchard Road, Singapore
- Orchard Road (Illinois), Northeast Illinois, United States
- Orchard Street, Manhattan, New York City, United States

== Other uses ==
- Orchard Street, a novel by Maurice Gee
- Orchard Road Presbyterian Church, Singapore
- "Orchard Road" (song), 1983 song by Leo Sayer
- Orchard Street (film), a 1955 silent short film directed by Ken Jacobs

== See also ==
- Garden Street (disambiguation)
