= Garden Street =

Garden Street may refer to:

- Garden Street (Brompton), Kent, England
- Garden Street (Santa Barbara), California, United States
- Sadovaya Street (English: "Garden Street"), Saint Petersburg, Russia
- Trädgårdsgatan (English: "Garden Street"), Stockholm, Sweden

== See also ==
- Orchard Street (disambiguation)
- Sadova (disambiguation)
