= Opinion polling for the 2019 Ukrainian parliamentary election =

In the run up to the 2019 Ukrainian parliamentary elections, various carried out opinion polling to gauge voter intention in Ukraine. The results of the polls are displayed in this article.

The date range for these opinion polls is from the previous parliamentary election, to the day of the election. The general election was held on 21 July 2019.

== Polling ==
=== Graphical summaries ===
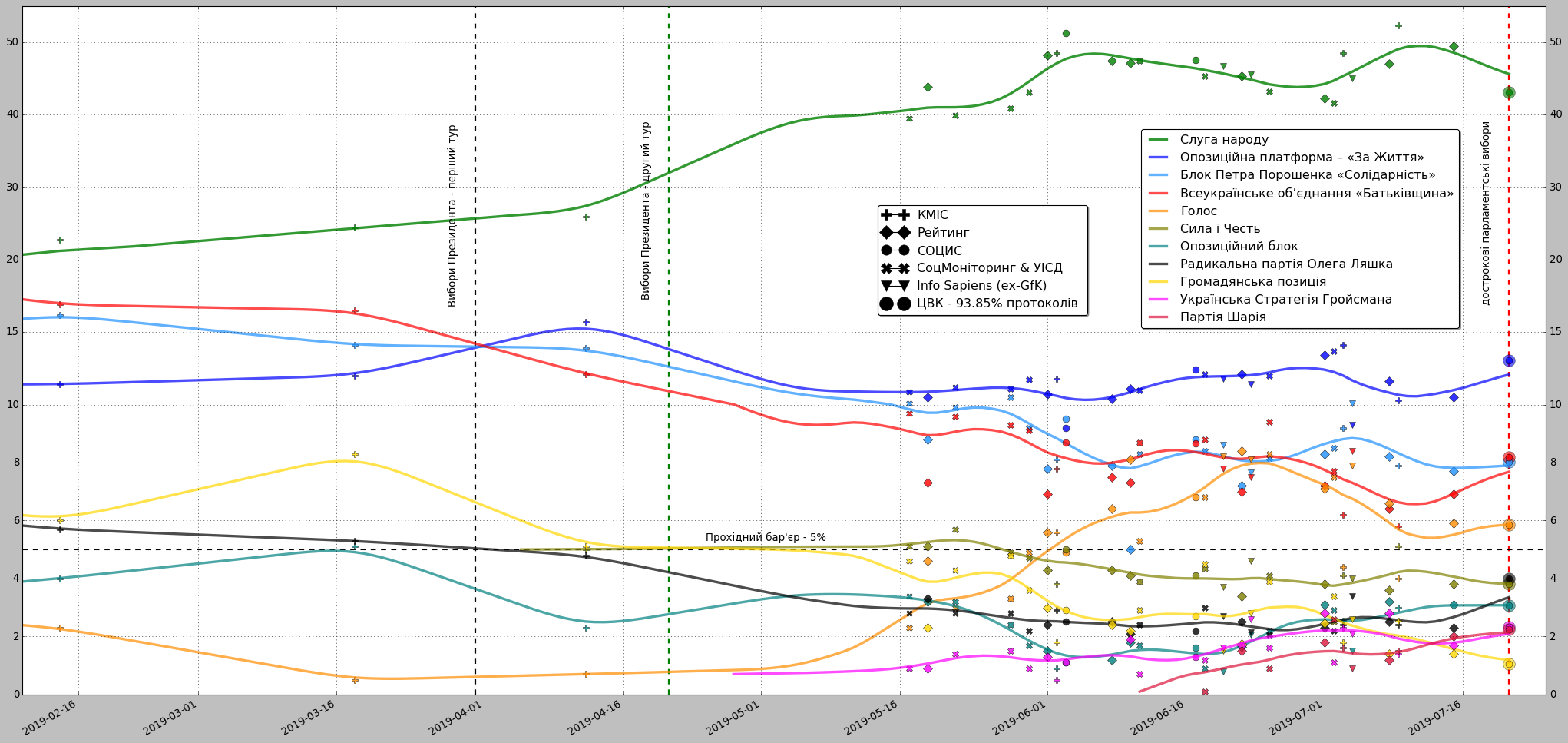
Opinion polls prior to the Ukrainian parliamentary election

=== Poll results ===
In 2019
Polling Firm/Link	Last date of polling	Servant of the People (political party)	Opposition Platform — For Life	European Solidarity	All-Ukrainian Union "Fatherland"	Voice (Ukrainian political party)	S&H	Opposition Bloc — Party for Peace and Development	US	Civil Position	Radical Party of Oleh Lyashko	Svoboda (political party)	Party of Shariy	Any other	Sample size
Rating	13.07.19 – 17.07.19	49.5	10.5	7.7	6.9	5.9	3.8	3.1	1.7	1.4	2.3	2.2	2.0		2500
Razumkov Centre	12.07.19 – 17.07.19	44.4	13.3	7.5	8.5	6.8	4.5	2.5	2.0	1.9	3.3	1.8	0.8		2018
Info Sapiens	09.07.19 – 16.07.19	45.7	8.1	11.2	7.7	8.1	4.8	2.5	1.8	0.6	1.5	2.9	1.9		1178
Seetarget	08.07.19 – 16.07.19	45.4	15.2	6.4	6.7	4.5	3.8	2.0	3.3	3.8	2.0	1.8	2.1		1205
Active Group	14.07.19 – 15.07.19	40.8	10.3	8.2	6.6	6.6	4.6	5.4	3.1	3.2	4.5	-	-		2800
IAP, Socioprognoz	08.07.19 – 15.07.19	42.2	15.1	9.8	8.3	4.9	3.0	2.0	1.7	3.3	3.6	1.6	-		2004
KIIS	03.07.19 – 13.07.19	52.3	10.3	7.9	5.8	4.0	5.1	3.0	1.3	2.5	2.4	1.5	1.5		2004
Razumkov Centre	05.07.19 – 11.07.19	41.5	12.5	8.3	7.0	8.8	4.6	3.8	2.0	1.8	2.4	2.5	1.2		2018
Rating	06.07.19 – 10.07.19	47.0	11.6	8.2	6.4	6.6	3.6	3.2	2.8	1.4	2.5	2.1	1.2		2000
CSEP	05.07.19 – 10.07.19	39.0	12.1	7.9	7.3	7.4	3.8	2.6	5.1	2.8	2.5	0.8	2.0		1800
SM & UICD	03.07.19 – 10.07.19	42.5	15.1	8.1	7.6	4.8	4.6	2.3	1.5	4.8	2.3	2.0	1.4		3019
FIP	05.07.19 – 09.07.19	41.9	15.3	7.9	7.2	4.8	3.0	2.0	3.6	3.7	4.3	1.6	1.6		1201
Active Group	06.07.19 – 08.07.19	39.2	12.5	9.7	7.1	4.8	3.7	5.3	3.2	3.3	3.6	-	-		
Seetarget	01.07.19 – 07.07.19	42.5	14.5	8.2	7.2	7.5	3.2	2.4	2.5	3.4	1.9	1.9	1.5		2009
FIP	30.06.19 – 07.07.19	40.9	14.3	7.9	7.0	7.2	3.1	1.9	3.8	3.9	2.3	2.3	2.1		2008
Research & Branding Group	29.06.19 – 07.07.19	44.8	9.6	7.0	8.4	7.8	4.2	3.7	1.2	4.3	2.7	2.5	1.1		2000
Info Sapiens	27.06.19 – 07.07.19	45.2	9.3	10.1	8.4	7.9	4.0	1.5	2.1	2.6	3.4	2.4	0.9		880
KIIS	25.06.19 – 07.07.19	48.5	14.1	9.2	6.2	4.4	4.1	2.5	2.3	1.8	2.4	1.6	1.6		2004
SM & UICD	28.06.19 – 04.07.19	41.6	13.7	8.5	7.7	7.5	2.5	2.9	1.1	3.4	2.2	2.0	2.6		1000
Sociopolis	27.06.19 – 04.07.19	45.4	10.9	8.3	6.6	7.0	3.9	4.3	2.2	2.5	1.8	1.5	1.4		2308
Rating	29.06.19 – 03.07.19	42.3	13.4	8.3	7.2	7.2	3.8	3.1	2.8	2.4	2.4	2.3	1.8		
IAP, Socioprognoz	21.06.19 – 03.07.19	43.3	13.5	7.9	8.1	7.5	3.3	2.1	1.8	3.7	3.8	2.0	-		
Active Group	28.06.19 – 30.06.19	42.1	9.6	9.3	8.0	7.8	2.9	5.3	2.2	3.5	3.8	-	-		
Edison Research	23.06.19 – 27.06.19	43.5	10.8	9.5	5.7	8.2	3.1	4.5	1.6	1.8	3.1	1.2	1.7		
SM & UICD	22.06.19 – 27.06.19	43.2	12.0	8.2	9.4	8.3	4.1	2.2	1.6	3.9	2.1	1.8	0.9		
Info Sapiens	15.06.19 – 25.06.19	46.7	11.8	8.6	7.8	8.2	3.7	0.8	1.6	1.5	2.7	1.4	0.7		
Rating	20.06.19 – 24.06.19	45.3	12.1	7.2	7.0	8.4	3.4	1.7	1.7	1.7	2.5	1.8	1.5		
SM & UICD	15.06.19 – 21.06.19	47.4	11.0	8.1	8.4	6.9	3.9	1.9	1.1	3.6	2.8	1.7	0.1		

Polling Firm/Link	Last date of polling	Servant of the People (political party)	Opposition Platform — For Life	All-Ukrainian Union "Fatherland"	European Solidarity	Voice (Ukrainian political party)	S&H	Civil Position	Radical Party of Oleh Lyashko	Opposition Bloc — Party for Peace and Development	Svoboda (political party)	US	Any other
Edison Research	20.06.19 – 24.06.19	44.9	11.0	5.5	9.6	8.5	3.5	2.1	3.1	3.2	1.6	1.7	
Rating for IRI	13.06.19 – 23.06.19	50	12	6	7	8	4	1	2	2	2	2	
DI & Razumkov Centre	13.06.19 – 20.06.19	42.7	10.5	10.2	9.8	6.4	5.2	4.1	2.0	2.5	1.7	1.6	
SOCIS	14.06.19 – 19.06.19	47.6	12.4	8.8	8.7	6.8	4.1	2.7	2.2	1.6	1.7	1.3	
Edison Research	15.06.19 – 18.06.19	40.6	12.6	7.8	7.3	10.7	4.4	3.3	4.0	1.3	2.3	1.7	
Active Group	14.06.19 – 17.06.19	42.3	9.8	8.4	8.3	6.1	4.5	3.3	4.1	4.3	3.0	2.5	
SM & UICD	08.06.19 – 14.06.19	47.5	11.0	8.7	8.3	5.3	3.9	2.9	2.4	1.7	1.5	0.7	
Rating	08.06.19 – 12.06.19	47.1	11.1	7.3	5.0	8.1	4.1	2.2	2.1	1.8	2.1	1.9	
SM & UICD	07.06.19 – 10.06.19	49.8	10.3	9.0	8.7	5.9	4.0	4.0	2.0	0.7	0.7	1.1	
Edison Research	10.06.19 – 13.06.19	45.6	10.5	5.0	7.5	9.5	4.8	3.5	4.7	2.7	1.4		
Rating	06.06.19 – 09.06.19	47.5	10.4	7.5	7.9	6.4	4.3	2.4	2.5	1.2	1.0	1.4	
SM & UICD	01.06.19 – 07.06.19	43.1	11.7	9.1	9.2	4.9	4.7	3.6	2.2	1.7	1.7	0.9	
KIIS	26.05.19 – 07.06.19	48.5	11.8	7.8	8.1	5.6	3.8	1.8	2.9	0.9	1.9	0.5	
SOCIS	29.05.19 – 06.06.19	51.3	9.2	8.7	9.5	4.9	5.0	2.9	2.2	1.1	1.5	1.1	
Rating	29.05.19 – 03.06.19	48.2	10.7	6.9	7.8	5.6	4.3	3.0	2.4	1.5	1.2	1.3	
SM & UICD	24.05.19 – 31.05.19	40.9	11.1	9.3	10.5	3.3	4.9	4.8	2.7	2.4	2.3	1.5	

Polling Firm/Link	Last date of polling	Servant of the People (political party)	Opposition Platform — For Life	Petro Poroshenko Bloc "Solidarity"	All-Ukrainian Union "Fatherland"	S&H	Civil Position	Voice (Ukrainian political party)	Radical Party of Oleh Lyashko	Opposition Bloc — Party for Peace and Development	Self Reliance (political party)	Decided
IAP	21.05.19 – 29.05.19	38.8	12.4	8.9	8.3	4.7	4.1	4.5	3.2	1.9	1.8	
SM & UICD	20.05.19 – 23.05.19	39.9	11.2	9.9	9.6	5.7	4.3	3.0	2.8	3.2	2.0	
Rating	16.05.19 – 21.05.19	43.8	10.5	8.8	7.3	5.1	2.3	4.6	3.3	3.2	1.1	
Rating & SM & UICD	30.04.19 – 10.05.19	39.9	10.9	10.6	9.1	5.1	5.0	0.9	3.3	3.5	2.0	
KIIS	9.04.19 – 14.04.19	25.9	15.7	13.9	12.1	5.0	5.1	0.7	4.8	3.4	1.4	

In 2019
Polling Firm/Link	Last date of polling	Servant of the People (political party)	All-Ukrainian Union "Fatherland"	Petro Poroshenko Bloc "Solidarity"	Opposition Platform — For Life	Civil Position	Radical Party of Oleh Lyashko	Self Reliance (political party)	Opposition Bloc — Party of Peace and Development	Nashi (political party)	Decided
IAP	19.03.19 – 26.03.19	26.1	20.1	13.5	13.8	8.0	4.7	2.6	2.3	1.4	
ICOM, New Image Marketing Group	16.03.19 – 24.03.19	24	17	14	13	5	6	-	7	-	
Rating, Razumkov Centre, KIIS	5.03.19 – 14.03.19	24.8	17.6	14.7	9.2	9.3	5.3	2.5	4.4	1.6	
KIIS	14.03.19 – 22.03.19	24.4	16.5	14.1	12.0	8.3	5.3	1.9	5.1	1.3	
UCI, SM	11.03.19 – 18.03.19	26.4	18.2	12.7	12.7	11.0	6.4	CP	4.2		
IAP	8.03.19 – 16.03.19	25.8	19.9	13.5	14.6	7.5	4.8	2.8	1.9	1.4	
Rating	09.03.19 – 15.03.19	22.4	19.1	15.8	10.2	7.9	6.1	3.2	3.2	1.3	
SOFIA	04.03.19 – 11.03.19	19.2	13.9	10.3	10.9	6.9	4.4	1.2	2.6	1.2	
IAP	18.02.19 – 27.02.19	24.7	19.3	13.1	13.5	7.0	5.1	3.2	2.5	2.6	
UCI, SM	20.02.19 – 01.03.19	23.2	18.0	15.6	10.8	8.5	5.5	4.0	2.6	3.2	
Rating	19.02.19 – 28.02.19	21.5	18.7	14.2	10.5	6.2	4.4	5.5	1.7	2.8	
Sofia	20.02.19 – 26.02.19	21.2	18.2	10.3	12.9	7.5	4.9	4.7	2.0	2.6	63
UCI, SM	16.02.19 – 23.02.19	21.9	17.8	12.6	11.0	9.7	6.0	5.8	2.9	3.3	
KIIS	08.02.19 – 20.02.19	22.7	16.9	16.2	11.4	6.0	5.7	3.7	4.0	1.5	
Sociopolis	08.02.19 – 15.02.19	21.4	17.7	15.1	10.4	8.9	6.0	3.0	2.2	2.7	

Polling Firm/Link	Last date of polling	All-Ukrainian Union "Fatherland"	Servant of the People (political party)	Petro Poroshenko Bloc "Solidarity"	Civil Position	Radical Party of Oleh Lyashko	Opposition Platform — For Life	Self Reliance (political party)	Opposition Bloc — Party of Peace and Development	Nashi (political party)	Decided
Razumkov Centre	07.02.19 – 14.02.19	15.4	18.0	14.9	8.0	5.0	6.6	3.0	2.5	2.0	74
KIIS	31.01.19 – 10.02.19	18.0	24.6	14.2	6.3	6.2	10.3	3.7	2.3	2.9	44
Rating, «Info Sapiens», SM	19.01.19 – 30.01.19	21.2	19.0	13.0	8.6	6.5	10.5	3.8	2.6	3.3	63
IAP	17.01.19 – 25.01.19	20.7	12.4	11.7	10.7	8.8	11.8	4.4	2.9	2.3	39
Active Group	18.01.19 – 22.01.19	19.7	19.0	14.7	6.2	7.0	4.0	5.9	7.6	2.2	46
2018
IAP	26.12.18 – 04.01.19	19.4	12.9	11.4	11	9.1	11.7	4.5	2.9	3.2	
UCI, SM	16.12.18 – 22.12.18	19.0	14.8	10.9	11.7	8.4	11.3	5.3	2.7	5.0	55
Sofia	16.12.18 – 25.12.18	19.5	12.6	9.6	9.0	7.3	13.0	4.3	2.5	4.8	65
DI & Razumkov Centre	19.12.18 – 25.12.18	19.4	11.4	14.1	8.1	6.8	10.4	3.9	3.2	3.9	59
Rating	16.11.18 – 10.12.18	21.7	12.4	9.8	7.8	6.5	3.9	4.0	9.5	4.2	60
IAP, Socioprognoz	07.12.18 – 18.12.18	25.0	-	13.3	12.9	9.9	13.5	5.0	3.0	4.0	56
Seetarget	01.12.18 – 06.12.18	21.8	12.9	10.1	7.7	9.2	11.9	5.2	2.8	2.6	62
UCI, SM	01.12.18 – 10.12.18	20.4	12.9	11,0	11.5	7.9	11.6	5.8	2.1	5.3	71
KIIS	23.11.18 – 03.12.18	23.4	13.0	11.2	9.1	8.0	11.3	3.6	2.0	4.1	56
USF	11.18	22.1	11.7	8.3	10.0	7.1	3.7	4.5	7.7	5.8	-
Sofia	19.11.18 – 22.11.18	20.3	9.2	9.5	7.5	6.9	18.9	5.5	OP-FL	3.9	61

In 2018
Polling Firm/Link	Last date of polling	All-Ukrainian Union "Fatherland"	Petro Poroshenko Bloc "Solidarity"	Self Reliance (political party)	Opposition Bloc	FL	Nashi (political party)		Svoboda (political party)	Agrarian Party of Ukraine	Civil Position	Servant of the People (political party)	UKROP	Decided
2018 Kerch Strait incident
Sociopolis	08.11.18 – 16.11.18	20.6	6.7	4.5	8	4.3	4.1	4.7	2.7	1.1	8.4	11.8	2.9	56.6
Rating for IRI	29.09.18 – 14.10.18	21	11	5	10	6	-	6	4	2	10	10	4	
KIIS, Rating, Razumkov Centre	16.10.18 – 02.11.18	22.8	8.5	4.6	9.7	4.3	5.2	7.4	3.2	1.5	10.3	12.0	3.8	59
KIIS, Rating, UICI, SM	18.09.18 – 16.10.18	21.4	9.1	5	11.3	5.4		8.1	3.4	1.7	10.5	9.8	1.6	72.3
Sofia	27.09.18 – 06.10.18	19.5	10.8	6.1	11.2	6.3	2.9	7.4	3.1	1.3	9.9	-	1.5	55
PPI	29.09.2018	21.9	10.3	3.1	8.5	4.3	-	5.5	1.9	2.2	4.8	13.3	1.0	49

In 2018
Polling Firm/Link	Last date of polling	All-Ukrainian Union "Fatherland"	Petro Poroshenko Bloc "Solidarity"	Self Reliance (political party)	Opposition Bloc	FL		Svoboda (political party)	Civil Position	Servant of the People (political party)	Decided
KIIS	08.09.18 – 23.09.18	19.6	11.2	4.1	10.1	9.3	8.1	3.5	9.3	8.2	47
KIIS (NDI)	07.18	20	7	3	13	7	12	2	10		40
Rating	10.09.18 – 18.09.18	20.4	8.6	5	8.5	9.3	6.7	3.9	9.1	12	68.5
IAP, UCI, SM	11.09.18 – 18.09.18	17.9	9.7	5.9	8.2	9.6	8.1	3.6	10.7	9.4	75
SOCIS, KIIS & Razumkov Centre	30.08.18 – 09.09.18	14.5	7.5	3.4	7.3	5.2	5.2	2.6	8	10	
DI & Razumkov Centre	16.08.18 – 22.08.18	18.5	7.7	4.1	7.1	8.7	6.4		9.4	6.4	
Seetarget	26.07.18 – 17.08.18	18.6	10.7	5.9	11.2	8.4	9.9	3.4	12.2		
Rating	20.07.18 – 03.08.18	19.5	6.5	4.3	11.4	7.2	7.0	4.1	11.2	10.5	58
IAP, UCI, SM (only cities 100k+)	07.07.18 – 11.07.18	19.3	9.3	5.6	12	12	7.6	4.6	12.7		71
GFK	30.06.18 – 08.07.18	18	8	3	9	8	8	3	11	10	67.5
Sofia	18.06.18 – 29.06.18	16.8	10.9	5.5	18.2		9.1	4.3	10.5	7.0	56
Sofia	18.06.18 – 29.06.18	16.1	11.0	5.4	13.8	7.0	8.2	4.5	10.4	8.6	55
Socis, "SM"	16.06.18 – 24.06.18	18.8	6.7	6.8	11.6	5.9	10.4	5.1	10.4		52
Rating	16.06.18 – 24.06.18	17	7.4	5.1	10.7	9.6	8.2	3.8	10.5	10.4	73.2
KIIS	07.06.18 – 21.06.18	19.5	7.3	3.5	10.5	10.3	9.7	3.8	14.4	5.2	67.2
KIIS	07.06.18 – 21.06.18	21.6	7.9	4.6	11.4	10.5	11.1	4.6	15.9		67.2
DI & Razumkov Centre	19.05.18 – 25.05.18	17.9	11.1	7.2	12.7	11.6	11.2	4.7	15.2	7.1	49
SOCIS	11.05.18 – 22.05.18	14.7	13.4	6.5	8.4	6.5	7.6	4.3	10.5	10.9	76.8
IAP	19.04.18 – 04.05.18	24.6	14.7	8.1	11.8	12.7	11.8	4.1	12.3		54
Sofia	19.04.18 – 30.04.18	16.5	12.7	7.0	14.1	7.6	8.7	4.9	11.9	-	61
Socis	19.04.18 – 25.04.18	17.1	12.4	5.8	11.4	8.4	8	2.3	12.9	12.5	62.8
Rating	10.04.18 – 22.04.18	15.6	7.6	5.2	9.6	8.2	8	3.8	9.7	9	62.8
KIIS	05.04.18 – 19.04.18	14.4	9.9	3.6	9.3	9.3	11.4	2.4	11.5	8.4	
Rating	15.03.18 – 31.03.18	18	10	8	11	9	10	4	10	6	51
IAP, UCI, SM	06.03.18 – 18.03.18	23	15	9	12	12	11	4	12		48.2
KIIS	05.02.18 – 21.02.18	22.5	6.6	6	12.4	10.3	13.7	5.8	9.4		65.7
Razumkov Centre	15.12.17 – 14.12.17	11	9	7	6	9	6	3	7	4	65
GFK Ukraine	15.11.17 – 14.12.17	19	12	6	14	13	8	5	10		43

In 2017
Polling Firm/Link	Last Date of Polling	All-Ukrainian Union "Fatherland"	Petro Poroshenko Bloc "Solidarity"	Self Reliance (political party)	Opposition Bloc	FL		Svoboda (political party)	Civil Position	Movement of New Forces	People's Front (Ukraine)	Decided
DI & Razumkov Centre	15.12.17 – 19.12.17	17.5	13.1	9.9	9.3	13.5	9.3	4.9	11.1	2.5	-	49
"KIIS"	02.12.17 – 14.12.17	17.2	13.4	7.4	10.7	10.2	10.2	5.4	8.8	3.1	1.8	57
"Rating"	22.11.17 – 30.11.17	16.8	14.5	6.5	9.4	8.9	7.7	5.6	6.8	-	-	
IAP, "Socioprognoz", "Kiev Press Club" and "Mediakhab"	14.11.17 – 24.11.17	18.1	15.3	7.4	9.2	13.1	12.6	6.3	8.6	3.4	-	55
Sofia	05.10.17 – 13.10.17	17.8	13.2	8.4	15.8	7.2	7.4	6.1	6.9	-	-	55.6
Razumkov Centre	06.10.17 – 11.10.17	10	13.6	5.9	8.6	6.8	6.5	4.2	8.9	-	-	
Socis	05.10.17 – 11.10.17	14.1	16.9	9.3	10.4	9.8	8.9	3.7	11.4	2.5	2	69.8
IRI	14.09.17 – 10.10.17	19	10	6	8	10	6	4	8	2	2	48
NDI, NED, GAC, USIAD, Sweden Gov.	05.09.17 – 17.09.17	14	11	11	10	14	13	6	3	4	-	67
IAP, "Socioprognoz", "Kiev Press Club" and "Mediakhab"	12.09.17 – 25.09.17	18.4	16.0	6.9	9.7	13.2	12.6	6.5	7.3	4.7	-	54
Sofia	06.08.17 – 12.08.17	16.7	14.1	9.8	15.0	8.5	10.5	5.1	9.1	2.7	-	46
GfK Ukraine & Center for Insights in Survey Research	09.06.17 – 07.07.17	20	8	6	8	10	10	6	6	3	1	52
"Social Monitoring" & Ukrainian institute social survey Yaremenko	20.07.17 – 29.07.17	18.0	13.3	5.7	11.4	12.1	10.5	6.2	6.7	2.5	-	52
Z&B Global	12.07.17 – 19.07.17	16.5	15.4	9.1	8.9	9.8	7.8	6.7	6.3	1.9	2.0	54
DI & Razumkov Centre	09.06.17 – 13.06.17	14.3	11.9	7.4	10.7	9.8	9.3	5.5	10.6	2.3	2.2	61
Rating for FOCUS	22.05.17 – 31.05.17	19.2	14.1	9.5	14.5	12.8	13.1	9.2	10.7	-	-	59
Rating	19.05.17 – 25.05.17	13.2	11.3	7.1	10.4	8.2	8.9	6.4	7.6	2.2	0.9	62
Rating	21.04.17 – 05.05.17	14.5	10.4	8.2	10.9	8.9	9.2	4.3	7.5	2.6	1.2	59
Sofia	26.05.17 – 01.06.17	14.0	12.7	8.1	13.4	8.2	10.1	5.1	7.3	2.9	0.9	62
Rating	12.05.17 – 20.05.17	13.9	10.2	7.1	10.4	9.2	9.5	6.6	7.7	1.7	0.9	61
Razumkov Centre	21.04.17 – 26.04.17	13.0	11.3	8.0	7.5	9.9	9.7	4.9	11.1	1.6	1.5	64
Z&B Global	03.04.2017 – 12.04.2017	19.0	15.7	11.0	12.7	13.3	9.9	5.8	8.5	(Note: Less than 4%)	-	63.5
NAN Ukraine	21.02.17 – 25.02.17	16.9	10.5	10.5	9.3	6.4	15.7	4.9	2.2	4.9	2.0	40.7
Active Group	24.02.17 – 03.03.17	17.9	12.4	10.2	11.4	11.8	10.1	4.9	8.4	-	-	-
2016
DI & Razumkov Centre	16.12.16 – 20.12.16	13.2	11.9	9.1	10.8	6.8	9.3	3.7	6.5	5.6	2.2	64
Rating	08.12.16 – 18.12.16	16	11.8	8.6	11.7	5.9	8.5	5.9	6.7	2.7	1.6	60
KIIS	03.12.16 – 12.12.16	18.3	11.9	7.6	12.2	10.4	9.8	5	4.8	4.1	1	54
UIF	21.11.16 – 28.11.16	17	14.6	11.7	8.8	5.4	9.7	5.9	4.3	7.4	–	47
Rating, SOCIS	24.11.16 – 02.12.16	15.5	14.1	9.8	11.2	8.8	9.1	4.9	7.1	4.1	1	65
Rating	10.11.16 – 17.11.16	17.4	12.6	7.4	11.1	6.2	8.4	6.1	5.6	3.1	1.1	59
Razumkov Centre	04.11.16 – 09.11.16	14.5	15.8	10.6	12.6	6	7.5	3.7	5	2.5	1.5	64
KIIS	04.11.16 – 13.11.16	19.1	13.2	6	10.1	8.1	9	5.5	6.1	3	0.9	44

Polling Firm/Link	Last Date of Polling	All-Ukrainian Union "Fatherland"	Petro Poroshenko Bloc "Solidarity"	Self Reliance (political party)		Wave (Note: Kasko, Sakvarelidze, Chumak)		Svoboda (political party)	Civil Position	Ukrainian Democratic Alliance for Reform	Democratic Alliance (Ukraine)	Decided	Others
Rating	28.09.16 – 07.10.16	16.6	12.9	9.2	10.9	2	11.2	6.5	6.6	–	0.9	61	23.2
KIIS	16.09.16 – 26.09.16	15.4	14.5	10.3	13.1	1.9	9.6	3.9	6.0	–	1.0	41	24.5
CSI Sofia	26.08.16 – 05.09.16	14.4	15.0	9.0	15.6	6.8	9.4	5.1	3.7	1.2	0.6	55.1	19.2
Rating	18.08.16 – 23.08.16	18.3	9.1	11	12.6	3.1	11	5.6	3.8	–	0.2	58.5	25.3
УIСД	05.07.2016 – 16.07.2016	17.9	13.8	14.7	15	5.1	13.7	7.2	–	–	–	57.8	12.6
VIP-Kонсалтинг	30.06.16 – 07.07.16	17.1	10.9	13.8	8.0	4.6	10.0	6.1	1.8	–	0.5	78.9	27.2
SOFIA	29.06.16 – 08.07.16	15.4	14.6	10.1	18.7	6.2	10.2	5.7	3	0.7	0.6	–	14.8
Rating	28.05.16 – 14.06.16	17.7	13.5	11.1	17.2	3.6	9.9	4.9	3.7	–	–	55	18.4

Polling Firm/Link	Last Date of Polling	People's Front (Ukraine)	Petro Poroshenko Bloc "Solidarity"	Self Reliance (political party)	Opposition Bloc		All-Ukrainian Union "Fatherland"	Svoboda (political party)	Strong Ukraine	Civil Position	Right Sector	UKROP	Mikheil Saakashvili	Decided	Others
KIIS	20.05.16 – 02.06.16	1.1	13.0	11.1	11.9	11.2	22.0	4.3	1.7	5.1	–	1.8	2.8	53.8	15.2
DI	11.05.16 – 16.05.16	1.6	11.9	12.7	10.9	10.1	14.4	4.3	2.3	7.2	2.2	1.8	3.2	55.7	17.4
Razumkov Centre	22.04.16 – 26.04.16	0.9	14.3	13.6	14.7	10.3	10.1	5.8	0.8	2.4	0.8	2.5	6.6	60.8	17.2
Rating	14.01.16 – 22.01.16	1.2	10.4	11.6	12.8	8.2	15.1	4.6	–	3.5	1.2	3.5	11.6	57	17.5
KIIS	23.02.16 – 08.03.16	2.5	10.9	11.4	12.1	11.6	20.5	5.8	1.1	5.6	0.7	2.2	4.5	56.0	15.4
Razumkov Centre	19.02.16 – 24.02.16	2.0	11.1	11.2	11.3	6.6	9.1	3.7	0.8	2.9	1.6	2.7	5.8	72.5	5.2
Gorshenin Institute	08.02.16 – 17.02.16	2.9	9.7	15.6	12.8	12.5	14.0	8.6	–	6.1	–	6.3	12.2	?	11.5
KIIS	05.02.16 – 16.02.16	2.5	16.6	11.8	14.2	10.3	15.1	6.2	1.0	5.3	0.9	3.9	3.6	41.3	12.5
Rating	14.01.16 – 22.01.16	0.9	14.3	11.7	13.5	5.5	11.6	6.9	1.5	2.8	2.0	4.7	11.6	61.1	14.8
2015
Rating	01.12.15 – 10.12.15	1.0	16.5	12.2	12.2	7.9	12.3	7.8	2.1	4.1	2.3	5.1		56.8	13.8
Rating	03.10.15 – 12.10.15	1.1	19.8	10.2	14.0	6.1	15.1	5.4	2.2	4.2	4.0	4.1		64.6	11.6
KIIS	17.09.15 – 27.09.15	1.3	19.9	12.8	11.0	7.4	18.8	3.2	2.0	4.0	6.4	2.2		58.4	10.9
KIIS	27.06.15 – 09.07.15	2.8	23.5	12.2	7.2	10.2	22.7	3.9	2.1	5.5	5.4	–		56.4	2.6
Rating	03.06.15 –13.06.15	3.4	20.5	13.1	12.7	7.9	12.4	4.8	2.6	7.1	6.6	–		56.2	5.8
Rating	19.05.15 – 29.05.15	4.1	21.2	15.8	9.7	12.0	15.3	4.6	2.6	5.4	4.1	–		39.2	4.5
Razumkov Centre	06.03.15 – 12.03.15	7.9	24.4	16.1	11.8	7.8	7.6	3.1	3.4	4.7	–	–		57.9	7.9
KIIS	26.02.15 – 11.03.15	6.6	26.7	17.1	10.2	8.4	11.5	4.1	–	4.8	5.2	–		61.8	2.8
2014
Rating	06.11.14 – 13.11.14	24.5	23.5	12.7	8.5	7.0	6.1	4.4	2.7	1.7	2.1	–		67	3.4
Ukrainian parliamentary election, 2014	26.10.2014	22.14	21.82	10.97	9.43	7.44	5.68	4.71	3.11	3.10	1.80	–	–	–	–

== See also ==
- Opinion polling for the 2019 Ukrainian presidential election
