= Opinion polling for the 2019 Ukrainian presidential election =

In the run up to the 2019 Ukrainian presidential election, various organisations carried out opinion polling to gauge voting intention in Ukraine. The results of such polls are displayed in this article.

The date range for these polls are from the previous presidential election to 31 March 2019. On 26 November 2018, Ukraine's parliament set the presidential vote for 31 March 2019.

== First round ==
=== Graphical summaries ===
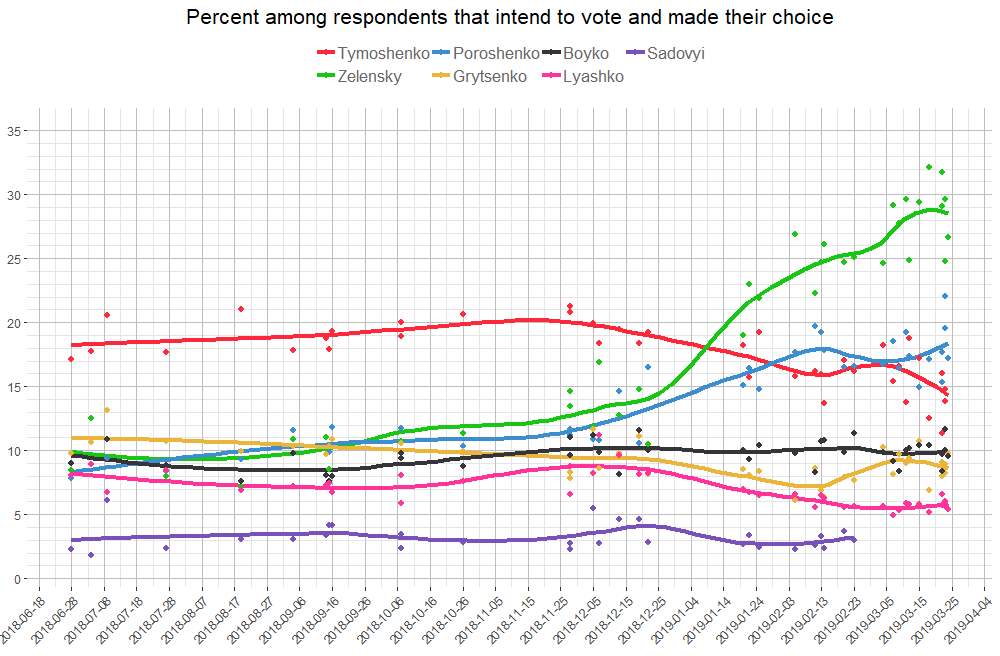

=== Exit polls ===
Pollster	Title	Polling stations	Margin of error^{[1]}	Sample size^{[2]}	Zelenskyy SP	Poroshenko Ind.	Tymoshenko FA	Boyko Ind.	Hrytsenko CP	Liashko RP	Vilkul OB-PDP	Smeshko Ind.	Koshul. Svoboda	Shevch. UKROP
TSN	Ukrainian Exit Poll for 31 March 2019	600	± 0.7 pp	20,000	30.1	18.5	14.0	9.1	7.6	5.0	3.7	6.6	–	–
Razumkov Centre, Foundation "Democratic Initiatives" & KIIS	National Exit Poll 2019	400	± 2.5 pp	19,431	30.6	17.8	14.2	9.7	7.1	4.7	4.0	6.5	1.7	0.5
SOCIS	SOCIS Exit Poll	430	± 0.8 pp	15,405	29.3	19.2	13.8	9.2	7.9	4.6	3.3	6.7	2.3	0.6

=== 2019 after candidates registration ===
Pollster	Date	Margin of error^{[1]}	Sample size^{[2]}	Zelenskyy SP	Tymoshenko FA	Poroshenko Ind.	Boyko Ind.	Hrytsenko CP	Liashko RP	Vilkul OB-PDP	Smeshko Ind.	Koshul. Svoboda	Shevch. UKROP	Decided
Rating	22–27 Mar	± 1.8 pp	3,000	26.6	17.2	17.2	9.5	9.8	5.4	4.0	3.5	1.9	0.9	77
Razumkov Centre	21–26 Mar	± 2.3 pp	2,017	24.8	14.8	22.1	10.0	8.2	6.0	4.6	3.7	1.5	1.5	75
Foundation "Democratic Initiatives", KIIS	20–26 Mar	± 3.7 pp	1,600	27.6	12.8	18.2	11.1	8.4	5.2	4.0	4.4	1.7	0.5	64
IAP	19–26 Mar	± 2.2 pp	2,000	29.0	18.7	16.5	12.6	8.9	4.3	3.2	1.8	1.5	1.1	71
UICI, SM	18–26 Mar	± 1.7 pp	4,040	29.1	16.0	15.3	8.4	9.0	5.7	6.1	2.9	1.9	1.6	68
Info Sapiens for Greenberg Quinlan Rosner Research	16–25 Mar	± 4.0 pp	1,075	27	15	19	11	10	4	2	3	1		81
BDM	16–23 Mar	± 1.6 pp	5,013	25.7	18.8	12.7	7.6	11.3	5.2	8.6	1.5	–	2.5	70
KIIS	14–22 Mar	± 3.3 pp	2,004	32.1	12.5	17.1	10.4	6.9	5.2	5.7	4.4	1.2	0.7	
Found UP	18–20 Mar	± 3.0 pp	1,486	18.9	17.2	15.9	7.9	9.2	10.6	9.1	–	–	–	73
UCI, SM	11–18 Mar	± 2.2 pp	2,047	29.4	17.2	14.9	10.4	10.7	5.8	4.9	2.1	1.8	–	–
SC of M.Dragomanov	9–18 Mar	± 2.3 pp	1,800	20.5	12.1	17.3	8.4	7.7	5.5	3.7	4.3	3.5	2.1	75
PPI	16–17 Mar	± 1.5pp	164,590	34.0	12.9	14.2	11.1	6.1	6.6	4.6	2.1	1.3	1.3	80
IAP	8–16 Mar	± 2.2 pp	2,016	26.5	18.6	17.1	13.8	8.8	4.8	2.8	1.2	1.4	1.5	63
Rating	9–15 Mar	± 2.0 pp	2,500	24.9	18.8	17.4	10.2	9.4	5.8	3.5	3.1	2.2	1.3	6
16.03.2019 - Taruta withdraws to support Tymoshenko
Total; Rating; Razumkov Centre; KIIS	5–14 Mar	± 0.8 pp	15,000	27.7	16.6	16.4	8.4	9.7	5.3	4.0	3.7	1.6	1.3	68
Total; Rating; Razumkov Centre; KIIS	5–14 Mar	± 0.8 pp	15,000	26.6	17.3	16.1	8.3	10.0	5.7	3.9	3.5	–	–	–
Total; Rating; Razumkov Centre; KIIS	5–14 Mar	± 0.8 pp	15,000	26.2	16.8	16.8	7.8	10.6	5.2	4.3	3.6	–	–	–
Total; Rating; Razumkov Centre; KIIS	5–14 Mar	± 0.8 pp	15,000	31.4	15.8	16.5	9.3	8.6	5.3	3.8	4.1	–	–	–
SOCIS, Yanus	9–14 Mar	± 2.1 pp	2,000	29.6	13.8	19.2	10.0	9.0	5.9	3.1	2.8	1.4	1.5	62
BDM	8–13 Mar	± 2.2 pp	2,016	25.9	17.9	13.3	6.1	9.8	6.2	7.9	1.0	0.8	3.3	66
USP	7–13 Mar	± 2.2 pp	2,000	24.9	19.0	17.3	9.0	10.6	5.4	3.1	2.5	1.2	2.0	76
SOFIA	4–11 Mar	± 2.2 pp	2,014	23.1	14.7	12.4	12.0	7.4	4.5	2.1	2.4	1.6	1.4	
Found UP	4–10 Mar	± 1.5 pp	3,986	23.5	15.9	15.8	8.2	9.1	10.5	9.1	3.5	–	–	61
SOCIS	5–10 Mar	± 2.1 pp	2,000	27.7	14.8	19.6	9.6	8.2	4.8	2.8	3.4	2.3	1.6	56.4
Rating	1–7 Mar	± 1.5 pp	5,000	24.7	18.3	16.8	9.9	10.3	5.7	2.7	3.3	1.4	1.3	
Info Sapiens for Greenberg Quinlan Rosner Research	23 Feb – 4 Mar	± 3.6 pp	1,308	24	13	20	8	8	6					

Pollster	Date	Margin of error^{[1]}	Sample size^{[2]}	Zelenskyy SP	Tymoshenko FA	Poroshenko Ind.	Boyko Ind.	Hrytsenko CP	Liashko RP	Sadovyi OS	Vilkul OB-PDP	Murayev "Ours"	Shevch. UKROP	Smeshko Ind.	Koshul. Svoboda	Decided
07.03.2019 - Dobrodomov withdraws to support Hrytsenko
07.03.2019 - Kryvonos withdraws to support Poroshenko
07.03.2019 - Murayev withdraws to support Vilkul
03.03.2019 - Hnap withdraws to support Hrytsenko
01.03.2019 - Sadovyi withdraws to support Hrytsenko
UCI, SM	20 Feb – 1 Mar	± 2.1 pp	2,197	25.2	16.9	17.5	9.3	7.2	4.4	3.0	2.3	3.9	2.2	2.6	1.1	
Rating	19–28 Feb	± 2.0 pp	2,500	25.1	16.2	16.6	11.3	7.7	5.6	3.0	1.5	2.5	1.8	2.5	1.7	
IAP	18–27 Feb	± 2.2 pp	2,022	25.2	17.9	15.4	13.8	7.0	4.9	2.6	2.6	2.6	1.7	1.3	1.3	64
Sofia	20–26 Feb	± 2.2 pp	2,012	22.9	19.3	15.1	14.0	8.0	5.4	2.6	2.1	3.1	2.4		1.0	65
UCI, SM	16–23 Feb	± 2.2 pp	2,047	27.3	18.8	18.2	10.9	8.8	6.1	4.0	2.6	3.9	1.7	2.4	0.8	63
BDM	14–19 Feb	± 2.2 pp	2,074	20.0	17.8	12.0	6.4	7.1	8.6	3.9	5.7	4.5	4.8	2.3	1.9	66
SOCIS	8–18 Feb	± 2.1 pp	2,000	24.7	15.9	19.2	10.7	6.9	6.5	3.3	1.1	1.8	3.9	2.7	0.9	64
PPI	16 Feb	± 0.5 pp	46,227	30.1	15.4	15.2	10.5	4.9	5.9	3.1	2.3	1.7	1.8	1.2		75
Sociopolis	8–15 Feb	± 2.0 pp	2,409	25.1	15.4	14.6	10.3	8.2	5.9	2.3	2.0	2.7	1.8	1.6	–	64
Razumkov Centre	7–14 Feb	± 2.3 pp	2,016	19.9	13.8	16.8	7.1	7.3	4.8	2.2	1.8	1.7	1.6	2.2	0.9	74
KIIS	31 Jan – 10 Feb	± 3.3 pp	2,007	26.9	15.8	17.7	9.8	6.1	6.6	2.3	1.6	2.9	2.2	2.4	1.3	60
Found UP	28 Jan – 10 Feb	± 1.5 pp	4,851	18.2	15.2	15.6	7.2	6.1	12.2	3.1	7.4	3.2	3.2	–		48

=== 2019 until candidates registration ===
Pollster	Date	Margin of error^{[1]}	Sample size^{[2]}	Zelenskyy SP	Tymoshenko FA	Poroshenko Ind.	Boyko Ind.	Hrytsenko CP	Liashko RP	Vilkul OB-PDP	Sadovyi OS	Murayev "Ours"	Shevch. UKROP	Vakarchuk Ind.	Koshul. Svoboda	Smeshko Ind.	Decided
08.02.2019 - CEC finishes registering candidates
Info Sapiens for Greenberg Quinlan Rosner Research	1–7 Feb	± 2.3 pp	1,759	28	15	18	9	8	6	2	3	1	1		1	1	–
BDM	1–6 Feb	± 1.6 pp	4,073	17.0	21.3	10.8	4.5	8.9	9.7	5.7	3.8	5.4	4.6	–	1.8	1.8	63
SC of M.Dragomanov	25 Jan – 2 Feb	± 2.3 pp	1,800	18.2	14.5	17.2	8.4	5.2	4.5	3.7	3.9	3.5	2.1	2.7	0.5	2	73
Found UP	18–31 Jan	± 2.5 pp	5,520	18.5	17.1	16.9	8.4	6.9	11.9	8.7	2.0	2.3	2.1	–			54
Rating, Info Sapiens, SM	19–30 Jan	± 1.0 pp	10,000	21.9	19.2	14.8	10.4	8.4	6.5	1.8	2.4	3.4	2.2	–	1.0		63
USP	27–29 Jan	± 2.0 pp	2,500	17.6	20.2	11.9	12.8	9.4	7.2	3.9	3.6	3.2	3.2	–	2.3		71
SOCIS, KIIS, Razumkov Centre	16–29 Jan	± 0.9 pp	11,000	23	15.7	16.4	9.3	8.1	6.7	2.4	3.4	2.7	3.5	–	1.3		66
Rating	16–24 Jan	± 1.3 pp	6,000	19	18.2	15.1	10.0	8.5	7.0	2.6	2.7	3.6	2.9	2.4	1.5		62
29.01.2019 - Poroshenko announces he will seek re-election
28.01.2019 - Vakarchuk declines to participate in election
IAP	17–25 Jan	± 2.2 pp	2,004	12.6	20.2	11.9	11.9	10.7	9.0	-	4.7	2.4	4.1	-	-		61
Active Group	18–22 Jan	± 2.2 pp	5,000	20.5	20.8	14.4	4.8	6.8	7.6	5.0	3.8	2.8	2.1	2.5	1.9		54
SC of M.Dragomanov	10–17 Jan	± 2.3 pp	1,800	9.4	17.4	17.1	5.4	5.3	10.1	2.6	5.1	0.9	3.8	2.7	0.6		68
BDM	3–14 Jan	± 2.2 pp	2,123	13.6	22.6	10.3	4.7	9.3	9.5	5.6	3.5	5.9	3.9	3.6	2.0		61

=== 2018 ===
After Kerch Strait incident
Pollster	Date	Margin of error^{[1]}	Sample size^{[2]}	Tymoshenko FA	Zelenskyy SP	Poroshenko BPP-S	Boyko OP-FL	Hrytsenko CP	Liashko RP	Vakarchuk Ind.	Sadovyi OS	Murayev "Ours"	Shevch. UKROP	Vilkul OB	Koshul. Svoboda	Decided
31.12.2018 - Presidential campaign begins
IAP	26 Dec – 4 Jan 2019	± 2.2 pp	2,016	19.3	12.9	11.3	11.6	11.1	9.1	–	4.5	2.9	4.2	2.8		63
Found UP	17 Dec – 4 Jan 2019	± 2.5 pp	5,312	18.1	12.8	15.1	6.2	8.1	13.5	3.2	2.2	4.8	3.0	6.3	1.6	69
Rating for IRI	13–27 Dec	± 2.0 pp	2,400	19	13	13	11	10	8	3	3	4	5	–	1	53
UCI, SM	16–22 Dec	± 2.2 pp	2,045	18.6	15.0	10.7	11.8	11.2	8.3	4.6	4.7	5.4	4.2	1.9	0.6	57
KIIS	30 Nov – 14 Dec	± 2.2 pp	2,034	18.4	17.0	10.9	9.9	8.6	11.2	4.3	2.7	3.7	5.1	1.6	0.3	62
KIIS	30 Nov – 14 Dec	± 2.2 pp	2,034	21.4	21.9	11.8	14.2	12.4	13.0	sup.Hryts.	sup.Hryts.	sup.Boyko	sup.Zel.	sup.Boyko	1.0	
KIIS	30 Nov – 14 Dec	± 2.2 pp	2,034	21.9	21.9	12.1	14.5	sup.Vakar.	14.0	10.1	sup.Vakar.	sup.Boyko	sup.Zel.	sup.Boyko	0.4	
KIIS	30 Nov – 14 Dec	± 2.2 pp	2,034	21.7	23.3	11.8	14.9	sup.Sadovyi	14.0	sup.Sadovyi	8.7	sup.Boyko	sup.Zel.	sup.Boyko	0.7	
SOCIS	16–25 Dec	± 2.2 pp	2,003	19.3	12.5	14.4	8.1	9.6	9.5	4.1	4.6	3.4	5.5	1.5	1.3	62
SOFIA	16–25 Dec	± 2.3 pp	2,017	20.3	13.6	11.2	13.1	9.5	7.6	3.7	3.5	4.8	4.0	2.4	0.2	64
DI & Razumkov Centre	19–25 Dec	± 2.3 pp	2,017	19.0	11.5	15.5	9.8	8.0	7.8	3.4	3.0	3.8	3.7	2.3	0.9	59
SC of M.Dragomanov	12–21 Dec	± 2.3 pp	1,800	17.3	11.9	14.4	6.4	7.1	5.6	5.1	2.7	2.3	3.7	–	–	
Rating	16 Nov – 10 Dec	± 0.5 pp	40,000	20.8	13.4	11.1	9.6	7.8	6.6	4.6	2.8	4.5	4.2	–	1.2	61
IAP, Socioprognoz	7–18 Dec	± 2.3 pp	2,022	24.5	–	13.1	13.1	12.7	10.8	–	6.4	3.4	4.3	–	-	61
Fond UP	10–18 Dec	± 2.5 pp	5,488	17.3	12.0	14.0	7.3	10.4	13.2	3.1	2.1	5.3	3.0	6.9	1.6	60
BDM	1–13 Dec	±1.6 pp	4,053	21.8	11.8	8.3	6.2	8.5	7.8	6.5	3.8	6.5	4.0	4.7	2.5	62
UCI, SM	1–10 Dec	± 2.1 pp	2,198	20.7	12.3	11.3	11.6	12.0	8.5	3.9	5.7	6.4	4.1	1.8	0.8	75
UCI, SM	1–10 Dec	± 2.1 pp	2,198	23.5	–	13.5	15.2	14.1	10.1	-	7.3	7.1	–	2.4		67
KIIS	23 Nov – 3 Dec	± 3.3 pp	2,000	21.2	14.6	11.6	11.0	8.2	8.7	3.8	2.2	4.1	3.9	1.6	0.9	56
Fond UP	1–30 Nov	± 2.5 pp	4,512	19.5	9.6	14.3	9.1	7.8	12.6	4.0	2.8	6.8	3.0	4.5	0.6	60
BURI	26 Nov – 1 Dec	± 2.2 pp	2,020	18.1	8.7	14.5	17.9	7.6	8.0	6.6	2.3	–	2.2	4.5	2.9	65
Rating	29 Sep – 14 Oct	± 2.0 pp	2,400	21	12	12	9	11	6	6	3		3	1	–	65
USF	Nov 2018	± 2.0 pp	2,500	22.4	11.8	10.5	4.5	10.8	7.5	-	3.6	6.2	3.3	–	–	

In 2018
Pollster	Date	Tymoshenko FA	Hrytsenko CP	Boyko Ind.	Vakarchuk Ind.	Zelenskyy SP	Poroshenko BPP-S	Liashko RP	Rabinovich FL	Sadovyi OS	Tyahnybok Svoboda	Murayev "Ours"	Taruta "Osnova"	Nalyv. "Justice"	Bezsm. Ind.	Vilkul Ind.	Decided
Before Kerch Strait incident
Sociopolis	8–16 Nov	21.8	9.1	9.1	7.3	13.9	9.2	5.9	5.3	3.4	1.2	4.7	1.2	1.1	2.1	-	67
Sofia	19–22 Nov	20.3	9.0	17.6	7.3	9.9	10.3	6.7	–	3.9	1.5	3.5	1.0	1.1	0.6	1.9	57
SC of M.Dragomanov	27 Oct – 4 Nov	20.1	9.6	8.8	6.8	13.3	15.1	7.2	3.6	3.1		4.9	–	-	-	-	50
BDM	1–13 Nov	17.2	6.8	8.1	6.5	8.9	9.5	7.2	3.8	4.0	2.7	5.1	2.2	2.2	1.3	2.7	62
KIIS, Rating, Razumkov Centre	16 Oct – 2 Nov	20.7	9.9	8.7	5.5	11.4	10.3	7.6	3.7	2.9	0.7	5.1	1.3	1.4	1.4	-	64
Rating for IRI	29 Sep – 14 Oct	20	11	10	5	12	12	6	6	3	3	–	1	1	1	1	50
BURI	25–31 Oct	16.3	7.2	11.4	5.6	7.3	12.3	6.6	7.6	2.3	–	–	–	-	-		70
KIIS, Rating, UICI, SM	18 Sep – 16 Oct	18.9	9.9	9.8	7.0	10.7	9.9	8.0	4.9	3.5	2.6	–	1.2	1.0	0.9		70
Practics of Government	Oct 2018	21	10	7	6	12	13	6	7	4	2	3	–	-	-		70
Active Group	19–22 Oct	21.4	9.0	5.8	7.4	13.8	12.4	6.4	3.3	4.0	2.1	3.1	1.9	2.1	1.4	1.9	59
UIoPO	2–15 Oct	22.2	7.2	8.0	-	-	17.6	7.9	3.7	3.9	–	–	–	-	-		59
Active Group	5–7 Oct	19.4	15.8	4.2	6.1	11.0	14.1	8.8	4.3	4.7	0.5	5.2	1.5	-	-		59
BDM	1–11 Oct	16.0	6.4	7.3	4.3	8.7	9.2	8.4	4.8	2.8	2.6	6.9	2.0	2.5	0.8	3.1	61
Sofia	27 Sep – 6 Oct	18.6	9.8	16.8	9.5	7.8	11.9	6.2	-	3.7	2.5	5.3	0.7	0.8	0.6		54
Sofia	27 Sep – 6 Oct	19.4	10.0	10.7	9.6	8.1	11.3	7.4	5.9	3.7	2.6	3.4	0.9	0.9	0.7		55
PPI	29 Sep	17.9	6.2	7.6	8.8	14.0	9.9	5.7	3.2	1.8	1.5	–	0.7	0.7	1.2	1.8	71
KIIS	8–23 Sep	19.3	10.9	8.1	8.4	11.8	11.9	6.7	7.5	4.2	1.6	–	1.0	0.5	1.0		52
KIIS (NDI)	July 2018	20	12	10	8		9	11	6	4	–	–	–	-	-		47
Rating	10–18 Sep	20.2	10.1	8.7	7.6	11.9	10.4	8.0	8.3	3.7	2.9	–	1.8	1.7	1.1		64
IAP, UCI, SM	11–18 Sep	18.0	10.4	7.6	8.7	8.5	9.9	7.6	8.8	4.1	3.2	–	0.8	1.1	0.4		56
BDM	27 Aug – 12 Sep	22.8	8.1	17.0	9.3	10.2	9.8	9.1	–		1.5	–	2.3	2.1	-		54
SOCIS, KIIS & Razumkov Centre	30 Aug – 9 Sep	19.1	11.1	10.6	11.3	11.7	12.5	7.7	6.4	3.3	2.4	–	–	-	-		58
DI & Razumkov Centre	16–22 Sep	22.5	9.7	7.8	7.0	8.3	9.4	7.3	8.6	3.2	1.9	–	0.7	1.3	1.0		62
Seetaerget	26 Jul – 17 Aug	17.9	13.8	11.2			9.1	9.8	6.2	3.4	1.7	–	–	3.9	-		53
BDM	2–16 Jul	18.6	9.3	12.9	–	12.2	8.7	8.9		5.2	2.1	4.3	3.5	2.1	1.6		57
GFK	3–22 Jul	23.1	15.5	10.7	8.8	1.4	8.1	10.4	8.5	2.9	1.7	2.0	–	–	1.0		41
BURI	25–31 Jul	17.9	16.5	14.0	–	–	14.2	12.8	15.1	4.2	5.4	–	–	–	-		57
UCI, SM	17–27 Jul	20.3	14.8	12.3	–	–	8.3	10.3	8.0	4.7	4.1	–	–	–	–		51
Rating	29 Jul – 3 Aug	17.7	10.7	8.9	8.0	8.0	8.3	8.5	5.9	2.3	2.1	–	0.9	1.9	1.7		62
BDM	12–25 Jul	16.9	11.5	11.0	7.2	9.7	7.4	9.6	3.2	4.7	2.6	6.1	2.0	–	1.3		56
Practics of Government	31 May – 1 July 2020	16	14	6	9	11	13	5	5	–	4	–	–	–	–		55
IAP, UCI, SM	7–11 Jul	20.5	13.1	10.9	–	–	9.4	6.8	10.9	4.6	4.3	–	–		1.2		54
BDM	27 Jun – 10 Jul	16.4	11.6	11.8	9.6	8.7	6.8	9.4	5.9	3.9	3.3	–	2.0	–	1.7		55
BDM	27 Jun – 10 Jul	18.8	13.7	19.4	10.5	9.7	7.7	11.1	-	5.3	3.8	–	–	–	-		50
Rating	22 Aug – 5 Sep	17.1	9.7	8.9	6.8	8.5	7.8	8.1	3.7	2.2	2.6	4.2	1.5	–	1.2		51
Gfk	30 Jun – 8 Jul	18	11	9	11	12	9	9	6	2	2	2	2	–	2		56
Sofia	18–29 Jun	16.2	10.5	12.1	9.2	10.2	11.7	10.0	6.7	5.5	3.8	–	–	–	–		57
Sofia	18–29 Jun	16.6	10.6	15.9	9.3	10.9	11.7	10.5	-	5.5	3.8	–	–	–	–		56

Pollster	Date	Tymoshenko FA	Boyko OB	Poroshenko BPP-S	Liashko RP	Groysman BPP-S	Sadovyi OS	Rabinovich FL	Savchenko Ind.	Hrytsenko CP	Tyahnybok Svoboda	Vakarchuk ind	Zelenskyy SP	Decided
Rating	14–24 Jun	15.9	10.5	8.6	8.6	–	3.4	7.6	–	11.7	2.8	8.6	9.3	52
KIIS	7–21 Jun	19.5	10.2	8.5	10.7	–	2.4	7.5	–	12.6	2.7	7.4	8.3	48
KIIS	7–21 Jun	21.8	10.6	10.5	13.2	–	3.9	8.4	–	16.0	2.6	–	–	39
BDM	2–14 Jun	17	13	10	9	–	6	6	–	9	4	9	7	55
SOCIS	11–22 Jun	13.7	8.3	12.4	7.1	–	4.1	5.0	–	10.4	3.0	10.8	9.8	69
DI & Razumkov Centre	19–25 May	19.4	12.3	11.1	10.8	3.2	5.1	8.0	1.3	13.7	4.4	8.2	7.3	52
BDM	12–24 May	20.7	21.9	8.4	12.1		5.3	–	–	11.9	3.3	8.0	5.7	49
BDM	12–24 May	18.1	8.9	7.0	10.8	3.8	4.0			11.0	2.3	7.9	6.3	52
Sofia	19–30 Apr	15.4	13.7	13.3	10.8	–	6.6	7.3	2.3	11.9	3.5	9.2	–	61
KIIS	5–19 Apr	16.1	8.6	12.2	12.2		3.3	8.8	–	12.7	–	9.6	10.8	49
BDM	19 Apr – 4 May	18.3	7.6	8.4	10.7	4.7	3.7	–	2.9	8.9	2.7	7.0	4.5	51
Socis	19–25 Apr	17.2	12.6	15.3	9.5	–	4.5	–	–	14.9	2.5	13.4		51
Rating	10–22 Apr	16.7	11.1	10.9	9.9		3.9	7.6	–	12.8	2.1	10.8	9.8	51
Socis, Yanus	1–14 Apr	16	10	15	9	–	7	8	–	17	3	16		51
BDM	1–14 Apr	24	11	10	11	–	9	-	6	5	4			58
BURI	19–30 Mar	12.2	5.7	11.6	8	6.4	4.4	9.1		6.7		6.1	8.6	
Sofia	2–13 Mar	21	14	14	10	–	6	9	1	11	6			52
BDM	2–13 Mar	21	11	10	11	5	9	11	4	6	3			52
IAP, UCI, SM	6–18 Mar	23	12	15	11	–	8	12	–	12	4			43
KIIS	21–28 Feb	25	10	10	16	4	5	10	–	13	4			39

=== 2017 ===
In 2017
Pollster	Date	Tymoshenko FA	Boyko OB	Poroshenko BPP-S	Liashko RP	Groysman BPP-S	Sadovyi OS	Rabinovich FL	Savchenko Ind.	Hrytsenko CP	Tyahnybok Svoboda	Vakarchuk Ind.	Decided
Rating	12–28 Dec	18.7	11.7	15.6	8.7	–	6.4	8.3	–	9.7	3.9	–	54
DI & Razumkov Centre	15–19 Dec	17.4	7.9	15.2	9.6	4.4	7.0	11.7	1.8	11.6	4.2		
Rating	22–30 Nov	15.8	7.0	13.8	8.0	4.6	4.6	8.4		8.3	4.7	9.6	54
Sofia	1–10 Dec	18.4	13.4	18.8	6.8	–	6.3	9.7	–	9.0	2.9	11.6	68
KIIS	2–14 Dec	20.5	9.5	16.9	9.2	3.6	8.5	7.8	–	12.8	3.2	–	38
SOCIS, Rating, Razumkov Centre, KIIS	28 Oct – 14 Nov	14.4	9.3	16.1	7.5	–	5.0	7.9	–	9.3	3.0	12.1	61
SOCIS	5–11 Oct	13.5	8.6	16.9	9.5		5.3	8.7	1.4	9.3	-	14.8	62
Sofia	5–13 Oct	18.0	13.3	13.9	7.4	2.2	6.9	7.3	0.8	8.8	3.4	3.8	56
Razumkov Centre	6–11 Oct	10.1	8.2	16.8	7.6	4.9	4.8	7.1	1.0	8.6	3.6	8.0	62
Sofia	4–13 Sep	18.1	15.0	17.1	8.8	1.5	7.2	8.3	–	7.1	4.1	3.7	54
"Social Monitoring" & Yaremenko	20–29 Aug	18.5	12.1	15.6	11.1	3.9	6.1	12.1	1.6	8.6	4.9		60
Rating	19–25 May	15.2	8.5	11.6	8.5	2.4	6.6	7.8	1.8	7.2	3.9	3.8	67
Sofia	26 May – 1 Jun	14.0	13.1	13.4	9.5	–	5.7	7.8	2.3	8.4	3.5	5.7	62
Rating for FOCUS	22–31 May	20.5	13.9	16.5	13.2	–	10.3	14.1	–	13.8	5.4		59
Rating	12–20 May	15.0	10.2	12.0	9.6	–	7.6	10.1	1.3	10.1	4.8		64
SOCIS	Apr 2017	16	8	18	14	–	8	17	–	14	6	12	50
Razumkov Centre	21–26 Apr	12.5	7.7	13.5	10.3	4.5	5.8	10.6	3.2	11.8	3.8		62
Active Group	24 Feb – 3 Mar	17.0	9.5	14.5	9.9	–	7.2	10.3	–	8.4	–		–

=== 2016 ===
In 2016
Pollster	Date	Tymoshenko	Poroshenko	Sadovyi	Savchenko	Boyko	Saakashvili	Liashko	Yarosh	Hrytsenko	Tyahnybok	Groysman	Rabinovich	Tihipko	Symonenko	Decided
DI & Razumkov Centre	16–20 Dec	13.7	14.6	5.5	3.3	10.3	–	7.5		8.9	1.8	5.2	6.3			63
Rating	8–18 Dec	17.7	13.5	8.4	1.8	10.4	–	8.8		8.1	4.9	–	7.3			61
KIIS	3–12 Dec	18.1	12.5	5.5	2.7	11.9	–	8.3		7.5	4.4	1.6	9.3			56
UICI Social monitoring	24 Nov – 2 Dec	18.7	18.7	10.2	0.5	11.9	1.5	10.0		7.8	5.4	3.7	10.3			59
Rating, SOCIS	24 Nov – 2 Dec	14.6	14.7	6.8	2.4	10	–	9.2		7.8	3.1	–	9.2			66
Rating	10–17 Nov	17.7	14.3	7.3	2.4	10.2	–	9.9		8.2	4.5	–	7.5			60
KIIS	4–13 Nov	24	17.9	6.8	–	9.1	–	9.6		9.8	4.1	–	10.6			50
Razumkov Centre	4–9 Nov	13.8	19.4	6.8	–	11.3	–	7.2		5.9	3.3	3.8	–			62
CSI Sofia	26 Aug – 5 Sep	16.9	15.4	8.7	–	15.0	5.4	9.7		7.8	3.8	–	–			58.5
Rating	18–23 Aug	17.7	10.7	8.9	5.6	11.5	–	9.8		7.5	4.3	–				60.5
Socio Stream AG	9–27 Jun	15.8	14.1	6.8	9.8	10.3	2.6	7.7		6.8	3.4	–	11.1			57
Gfk Ukraine	13–28 Jun	22	14	12	–	16	–	16		12	2	–	–			50
SOFIA	29 Jun – 8 Jul	16.1	13.3	9.5	12.9	15.8	7.2	7.5		5	2.8	–	0.7			55
КМІС	20 May – 2 Jun	24.3	14.0	12.9		11.8		12.5	2.6	9.8	3.9			–	–	39.8
КМІС	20 May – 12 Jun	21.0	13.5	10.9		8.4		14.6	4.0	12.7	2.9			–	–	53
КМІС	23 Feb – 8 Mar	22.6	16.2	10.4		8.8		11.2	4	8.4	3.6			4	2.2	54.7
КМІС	5–16 Feb	17.1	22.8	10.7		9.6		11.5	6.5	8.8	2.9			3.2	1.3	39.8
Rating	14–22 Jan	13.6	22.3	12.4		10.4		5.4	3.1	5.5	6.1			3.5	–	63.0

=== 2015 ===
Pollster	Date	Tymoshenko	Poroshenko	Sadovyi	Boyko	Liashko	Hrytsenko	Yarosh	Tihipko	Symonenko	Tyahnybok	Yatsenyuk	Klitschko	Decided	Other
Rating	3–12 Oct	15.5	25.5	9.0	12.4	6.6	6.0	4.4	3.3	–	4.2	0.7	–	65.8	12.3
КМІС	17–27 Sep	20.5	25.3	8.6	8.8	7.7	8.1	7.9	–	–	2.4	–	–	54.1	10.7
КМІС	27 Jun – 9 Jul	25.6	26.9	7.9	4.4	8.5	8.5	5.7	–	–	2.2	2.4	1.3	54.3	6.7
Rating	3–13 Jun	13.1	31.6	8.4	7.5	6.2	7.6	4.8	2.5	–	2.7	2.0	–	58.1	13.6
КМІС	19–29 May	17.0	32.0	9.0	3.5	9.9	6.5	3.9	3.9	1.0	2.8	–	–	41.1	10.4
Razumkov Centre	6–12 Mar	6.1	31.8	10.7	6.2	6.1	5.9	4.2	3.6	4.3	1.8	4.7	0.8	61	13.8
КМІС	26 Feb – 11 Mar	11.6	35.2	11.4	2.8	7.7	7.1	5.0	2.4	1.6	2.5	5.2	–	63	7.4

=== 2014 ===
Pollster	Date	Tymoshenko	Poroshenko	Liashko	Hrytsenko	Tihipko	Symonenko	Tyahnybok
SOCIS	Sep 2014	7	53	11	8	6	3	3
SOCIS	Aug 2014	6	50	15	9	6	3	4
SOCIS	July 2014	7	49	16	6	6	3	3
2014 elections	25 May 2014	12.81	54.70	8.32	5.48	5.23	1.51	1.16
2010 elections	17 Jan 2010	25.05	–	–	1.2	13.06	3.6	1.4

== Second round ==
=== Exit polls ===
Title Pollster	Polling stations	Margin of error^{[1]}	Sample size^{[2]}	Zelenskyy SP	Poroshenko Ind.
National Exit Poll 2019; Razumkov Centre; Foundation "Democratic Initiatives"; KIIS	300	± 3.0 pp	13,000	73.2	25.3
Ukrainian Exit Poll for 31 March 2019; TSN	600	± 0.7 pp	20,000	72.7	27.3
Exit-poll PPI; PPI	11,100		586,677	75.2	23.1

=== Zelenskyy vs Poroshenko ===
Poll	Date	Zelenskyy SP	Poroshenko Ind.	Hard to say / against all	Will not vote
KMIC	9–14 Apr	48.4	17	28.3	6.3
Edison Research	11–13 Apr	55.1	30.9	11.6	2.3
Rating	5–10 Apr	51.0	20.8	17.8	10.3
Before the first round
SORA, СоцМоніторинг, УІСД	31 Mar	49.4	19.8	19.2	11.6
Razumkov Centre	21–26 Mar	36.5	22.7	31.2	9.6
Fama	16–22 Mar	40.1	19.2	23.5	17.2
КМІС	14–22 Mar	43.0	17.6	27.6	11.8
УІСД, СоцМоніторинг	11–18 Mar	41	18.2	18.2	22.5
Rating	9–15 Mar	39	19	19	23
Rating, КМІС, Razumkov Centre	5–14 Mar	39	18	20	23
Rating	19–28 Feb	42	24	15	19
УІСД, СоцМоніторинг	16–23 Feb	38.1	20.5	16.0	25.4
Razumkov Centre	7–14 Feb	32.2	19.1	37.5	11.2
КМІС	31 Jan – 10 Feb	39.6	18.1	29.4	12.9
PPI	18 Feb	70	30		
Sociopolis	8–15 Feb	42	18		
Razumkov Centre	7–14 Feb	32	19		
KIIS	31 Jan – 10 Feb	40	18		
Rating	16–24 Jan	34	20		
BDM	3–14 Jan	30	13		
2018
Rating	13–27 Dec	29	14		
DI & Razumkov Centre	19–25 Dec	22	17		
KIIS	23 Nov – 3 Dec	28	12		
Sociopolis	8–16 Nov	32	13		
DI & Razumkov Centre	19–25 Dec	22	17		
КМІС	23 Nov – 3 Dec	28	12		
КМІС, Rating, Razumkov Centre	16 Oct – 2 Nov	28	15		
Active Group	19–22 Oct	29	18		

=== Zelenskyy vs Tymoshenko ===
Poll	Date	Zelenskyy SP	Tymoshenko FA
Sociopolis	8–15 Feb	36	22
PPI	18 Feb	66	33
Razumkov Centre	7–14 Feb	28	18
KIIS	31 Jan – 10 Feb	36	22
Rating	16–24 Jan	29	24
Rating	13–27 Dec	23	24
BDM	3–14 Jan	24	26
2018
DI & Razumkov Centre	19–25 Dec	21	20
Rating	16 Nov – 10 Dec	26	25
KIIS	23 Nov – 3 Dec	23	22
Sociopolis	8–16 Nov	28	25
BDM	1–13 Nov	18	22
KIIS, Rating, Razumkov Centre	16 Oct – 2 Nov	23	26
Active Group	19–22 Oct	23	27

=== Zelenskyy vs Boyko ===
Poll	Date	Zelenskyy SP	Boyko Ind.
Sociopolis	8–15 Feb	39	18
PPI	18 Feb	69	30
Rating	16–24 Jan	33	17
2018
Sociopolis	8–16 Nov	30	19
BDM	1–13 Nov	26	12
BDM	1–13 Nov	25	15
Active Group	19–22 Oct	29	12

=== Zelenskyy vs Hrytsenko ===
Poll	Date	Zelenskyy SP	Hrytsenko CP
Sociopolis	8–15 Feb	37	20
Sociopolis	8–16 Nov	27	22
Active Group	19–22 Oct	26	20

=== Zelenskyy vs Vakarchuk ===
Poll	Date	Zelenskyy SP	Vakarchuk ind
Sociopolis	8–16 Nov 2018	25	16
Active Group	19–22 Oct 2018	25	13

=== Poroshenko vs Tymoshenko ===
Poll	Date	Poroshenko Ind.	Tymoshenko FA
Sociopolis	8–15 Feb	19	28
PPI	18 Feb	42	55
Razumkov Centre	7–14 Feb	20	22
KIIS	31 Jan – 10 Feb	19	27
Rating	16–24 Jan	18	29
2018
Rating	13–27 Dec	13	26
BDM	3–14 Jan	12	26
DI & Razumkov Centre	19–25 Dec	16	22
Rating	16 Nov – 10 Dec	15	29
KIIS	23 Nov – 3 Dec	12	23
Sociopolis	8–16 Nov	12	27
BDM	1–13 Nov	12	25
KIIS, Rating, Razumkov Centre	16 Oct – 2 Nov	14	29
KIIS, Rating, UICI, SM	18 Oct – 16 Nov	15	31
Active Group	19–22 Oct	18	27
PPI	29 Sep	34	66
BDM	27 Aug – 12 Sep	10	19
BDM	02–16 Aug	13	23
Gfk	30 Jun – 8 Jul	9	20
BDM	12–24 May	13	27
Sofia	19–30 Apr	23	32
KIIS	5–19 Apr	12	23
BDM	1–14 Apr	16	30
BDM	1–14 Apr	16	28
2017
Rating	12–28 Dec	23	30
Rating	22–30 Dec	21	27
Rating	19–25 May	24	32
2016
Rating	10–17 Nov 2016	16	27
Rating	June 2016	15	20
2015
Rating	Oct 2015	25	19

=== Poroshenko vs Boyko ===
Poll	Date	Poroshenko Ind.	Boyko Ind.
Sociopolis	8–15 Feb	23	25
PPI	18 Feb	47	52
KIIS	31 Jan – 10 Feb	23	20
Rating	16–24 Jan	23	21
2018
DI & Razumkov Centre	19–25 Dec	20	14
KIIS	23 Nov – 3 Dec	15	19
Sociopolis	8–16 Nov	15	23
BDM	1–13 Nov	16	15
KIIS, Rating, Razumkov Centre	16 Oct – 2 Nov	17	20
KIIS, Rating, UICI, SM	18 Oct – 16 Nov	20	20
Active Group	19–22 Oct	21	15
PPI	29 Sep	44	56
BDM	27 Aug – 12 Sep	13	16
BDM	02–16 Aug	18	20
Gfk	30 Jun – 8 Jul	11	16
BDM	12–24 May	18	22
Sofia	19–30 Apr	27	32
Before 2018
Rating	19–25 May 2017	28	26
Rating	10–17 Nov 2016	23	17

=== Poroshenko vs Hrytsenko ===
Poll	Date	Poroshenko Ind.	Hrytsenko CP
Sociopolis	8–15 Feb	18	28
Rating	16–24 Jan	28	18
BDM	3–14 Jan	11	26
2018
DI & Razumkov Centre	19–25 Dec	15	22
Sociopolis	8–16 Nov	12	26
BDM	1–13 Nov	11	24
KIIS, Rating, Razumkov Centre	16 Oct – 2 Nov	14	26
KIIS, Rating, UICI, SM	18 Oct – 16 Nov	14	23
Active Group	19–22 Oct	18	25
Gfk	30 Jun – 8 Jul	7	26

=== Poroshenko vs Vakarchuk ===
Poll	Date	Poroshenko Ind.	Vakarchuk ind
KIIS	23 Nov – 3 Dec	11	24
Sociopolis	8–16 Nov	12	28
Active Group	19–22 Oct	17	25

=== Tymoshenko vs Boyko ===
Poll	Date	Tymoshenko FA	Boyko Ind.
Sociopolis	8–15 Feb	28	21
PPI	18 Feb	56	44
KIIS	31 Jan – 10 Feb	29	16
BDM	3–14 Jan	27	14
2018
DI & Razumkov Centre	19–25 Dec	24	12
Rating	16 Nov – 10 Dec	29	16
KIIS	23 Nov – 3 Dec	24	15
Sociopolis	8–16 Nov	28	19
BDM	1–13 Nov	25	16
KIIS, Rating, Razumkov Centre	16 Oct – 2 Nov	25	16
KIIS, Rating, UICI, SM	18 Oct – 16 Nov	30	17
Active Group	19–22 Oct	29	11
PPI	29 Sep	63	37
BDM	27 Aug – 12 Sep	20	17
Gfk	30 Jun – 8 Jul	20	12
BDM	12–24 May	26	21
Sofia	19–30 Apr	33	28
Rating	19–25 May	36	28
Rating	10–17 Nov 2016	30	15

=== Tymoshenko vs Hrytsenko ===
Poll	Date	Tymoshenko FA	Hrytsenko CP
Sociopolis	8–15 Feb	25	26
KIIS	31 Jan – 10 Feb	25	21
BDM	3–14 Jan	25	17
2018
DI & Razumkov Centre	19–25 Dec	20	21
Rating	16 Nov – 10 Dec	26	21
KIIS	23 Nov – 3 Dec	21	20
Sociopolis	8–16 Nov	26	21
BDM	1–13 Nov	21	16
KIIS, Rating, Razumkov Centre	16 Oct – 2 Nov	27	20
KIIS, Rating, UICI, SM	18 Oct – 16 Nov	25	27
Active Group	19–22 Oct	26	21
BDM	27 Aug – 12 Sep	18	16
BDM	02–16 Aug	20	17
Gfk	30 Jun – 8 Jul	16	20
BDM	12–24 May	23	20

=== Tymoshenko vs Vakarchuk ===
Poll	Date	Tymoshenko FA	Vakarchuk ind
KIIS	23 Nov – 3 Dec	23	19
Sociopolis	8–16 Nov	26	24
BDM	1–13 Nov	22	14
Active Group	19–22 Oct	29	21

=== Tymoshenko vs Murayev ===
Poll	Date	Tymoshenko FA	Murayev "Ours"
BDM	3–14 Jan 2019	26	16

=== Hrytsenko vs Boyko ===
Poll	Date	Hrytsenko CP	Boyko Ind.
KIIS, Rating, UICI, SM	18 Oct – 16 Nov	31	16
Active Group	19–22 Oct	25	13
BDM	02–16 Aug	22	19
Gfk	30 Jun – 8 Jul	23	10
BDM	12–24 May	25	23

=== Hrytsenko vs Vakarshuk ===
Poll	Date	Hrytsenko CP	Vakarchuk ind
Active Group	19–22 Oct	21	21

== Regional polls ==
=== Donetsk Oblast ===
Pollster	Date	Margin of error^{[1]}	Sample size^{[2]}	Boyko Ind.	Zelenskyy SP	Tymoshenko FA	Poroshenko Ind.	Liashko RP	Vilkul OB-PDP	Hrytsenko CP	Smeshko Ind.	Decided
Seetarget	28 Feb – 7 Mar 2019	± 3.5 pp	804	35.3	26.1	8.5	7.7	5.2	3.7	2.2	0.7	47
Seetarget	2–10 Feb 2019	± 3.5 pp	807	30.9	27.9	5.9	15.5	2.1	2.7	4.5	0.6	58

=== Luhansk Oblast ===
Pollster	Date	Margin of error^{[1]}	Sample size^{[2]}	Boyko Ind.	Zelenskyy SP	Tymoshenko FA	Poroshenko Ind.	Liashko RP	Vilkul OB-PDP	Hrytsenko CP	Smeshko Ind.	Decided
Seetarget	7–13 Mar 2019	± 4.2 pp	602	43.0	25.2	8.1	4.7	6.2	3.0	4.2	0.8	51
Seetarget	28 Feb – 7 Mar 2019	± 3.5 pp	800	49.4	25.7	7.1	5.5	4.7	0.4	2.4	1.2	49

=== Kharkiv Oblast ===
Pollster	Date	Margin of error^{[1]}	Sample size^{[2]}	Boyko Ind.	Zelenskyy SP	Tymoshenko FA	Poroshenko Ind.	Hrytsenko CP	Liashko RP	Vilkul OB-PDP	Smeshko Ind.	Decided
Seetarget	22 Feb – 1 Mar 2019	± 3.5 pp	801	28.3	21.2	12.7	7.9	7.3	3.2	1.9	1.9	33
Seetarget	3–13 Feb 2019	± 3.5 pp	802	29.2	20.1	11.4	8.7	7.4	3.4	2.1	1.0	33

=== Kyiv Oblast ===
Pollster	Date	Margin of error^{[1]}	Sample size^{[2]}	Zelenskyy SP	Tymoshenko FA	Poroshenko Ind.	Hrytsenko CP	Boyko Ind.	Liashko RP	Smeshko Ind.	Vilkul OB-PDP	Decided
Seetarget	1–7 Mar 2019	± 3.5 pp	807	25.1	18.2	17.9	8.2	6.9	4.8	2.8	1.4	78

=== Odesa Oblast ===
Pollster	Date	Margin of error^{[1]}	Sample size^{[2]}	Boyko Ind.	Zelenskyy SP	Tymoshenko FA	Poroshenko Ind.	Hrytsenko CP	Liashko RP	Vilkul OB-PDP	Smeshko Ind.	Decided
Seetarget	1–7 Mar 2019	± 3.5 pp	805	25.7	24.9	15.8	7.3	6.8	6.1	2.0	0.3	28
Seetarget	2–10 Feb 2019	± 3.5 pp	804	24.7	24.2	19.6	7.4	3.0	6.8	2.1	0.0	33

=== Lviv Oblast ===
Pollster	Date	Margin of error^{[1]}	Sample size^{[2]}	Poroshenko Ind.	Zelenskyy SP	Tymoshenko FA	Hrytsenko CP	Liashko RP	Boyko Ind.	Vilkul OB-PDP	Smeshko Ind.	Decided
Seetarget	18–25 Feb 2019	± 3.5 pp	803	27.9	15.4	14.8	10.0	3.7	2.9	0.3	1.6	27

== See also ==
- Opinion polling for the 2019 Ukrainian parliamentary election
- Opinion polling for the next Ukrainian presidential election
