= Sadovyi (surname) =

Sadovyi (Ukrainian: Садовий) or Sadovy (Russian: Садовый) is an East Slavic surname. Notable people with the surname include:

- Andriy Sadovyi (born 1968), Ukrainian politician
- Liza Sadovy, British actress
- Yevgeny Sadovy (born 1973), Russian swimmer

== See also ==
- Sadovy (disambiguation)
