= Kateryna Kit-Sadova =

Ukrainian art critic and businesswoman (born 1974)

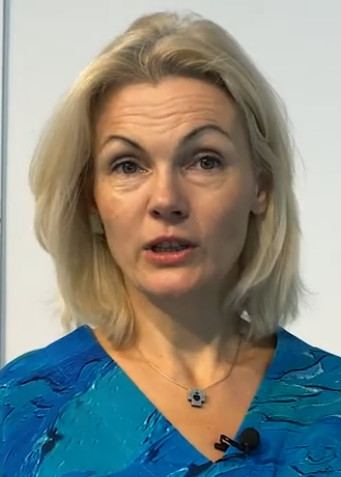
- Kit-Sadova in 2021
- Born: 30 September 1974 (age 52); Kalush, Ukrainian SSR, Soviet Union
- Occupations: Art critic, businesswoman
- Title: co-owner of TRK Lux media
- Spouse: Andriy Sadovyi
- Children: 5

Kateryna Orestivna Kit-Sadova (Ukrainian: Катерина Орестівна Кіт-Садова; born 30 September 1974) is the wife of Andriy Sadovy, the mayor of Lviv, co-owner of the media holding TRK Lux media, which includes radio stations Radio Maximum, Nostalgie, Lux FM, website Zaxid.net, TV channels Football 24, Channel 24, and advertising agency "Lux".

== Biography ==
Kateryna Sadova was born in Kalush, Ivano-Frankivsk region on 30 September 1974. In 1997, she graduated from Lviv National Academy of Arts. During her studies, she met her future husband, Andriy Sadovyi. After graduation, she worked at the Center of Modern Art.

In 2001, she married Sadoviy and they had their first child the following year, after which she became a stay-at-home mother. Sadoviy became Lviv mayor in 2006. The family has five sons. Sadova was ranked as the richest wife of Ukrainian mayors, as well as the richest woman in Western Ukraine.
