= Zaxid.net =

Ukrainian news website

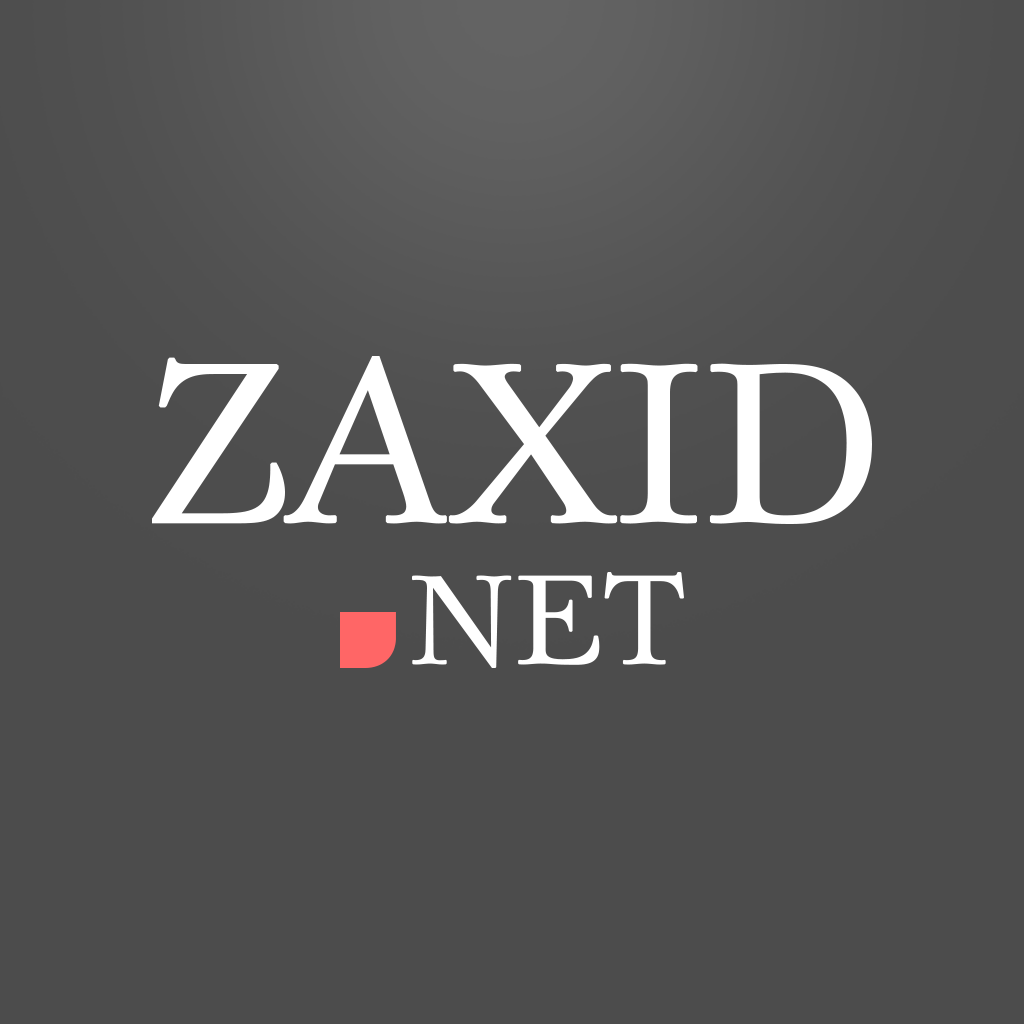
- Website type: News and opinion website
- Available in: Ukrainian
- Headquarters: Lviv, {{{location_country}}}
- Owner: Television and Radio Company Luks
- Key people: Andriy Sadovyi
- Employees: 24 (2025)
- Website: zaxid.net
- Commercial: Yes
- Launched: 4 May 2007; 19 years ago
- Current status: Active

Zaxid.net (from Ukrainian Захід 'West') is a Ukrainian news and opinion website that focuses on coverage of Western Ukraine. The website was founded in 2007 and is associated with Lviv mayor Andriy Sadovyi. It was described as liberal-conservative.

== History ==
Zaxid.net was founded on 4 May 2007, coinciding with Lviv City Day. At the time, there were three news sites based in the city, but they functioned like a wire service, targeting audiences across Ukraine. In contrast, Zaxid.net was established as a regional news and analysis website. Up to 2011, the content was presented in Ukrainian, Russian, and Polish. Since 2011, only the Ukrainian language remained.

In May 2010, the site was bought by the Television and Radio Company Luks, which also owned the TV channel 24 Kanal. The company is indirectly majority-owned by Lviv mayor Andriy Sadovyi. Previously, his connection to Zaxid.net was only alleged.

In 2018, the main office of Zaxid.net was blocked by activists attempting to break inside. The site's journalists claimed they had received threats from 'nationalist groups,' which the media outlet asserted was a reprisal for its reporting.

In 2020, Zaxid.net won a defamation lawsuit filed against it by the National Union of Artists of Ukraine after it published an article alleging that the Union expelled its members improperly and its leadership engaged in corruption.

== Chief editors ==
No.	Name	Term			Ref.
No.	Name	Start	End	Duration	Ref.
1	Ihor Balynskyi	4 May 2007	18 March 2009	1 year, 10 months and 14 days	
2	Svitlana Zhabiuk	18 March 2009	31 August 2011	2 years, 5 months and 13 days	
3	Tetiana Solntseva	31 August 2011	17 October 2013	2 years, 1 month and 17 days	
4	Oleh Onysko	17 October 2013	6 March 2023	9 years, 4 months and 17 days	
5	Yaroslav Ivanochko	6 March 2023	Incumbent	3 years, 6 months and 16 days	

== Reception ==
The audience of the media is roughly 60% male. In 2025, based on a SimilarWeb analysis Zaxid.net was the 19th most popular news website in Ukraine. A poll of Ternopil residents found that 44% of respondents were aware of the site. According to the Zaxid.net chief editor, 30–35 thousand Lviv citizens visited the site daily in 2017.

Following the Revolution of Dignity, the Ukrainian Parliament repealed the law on regional languages. In response, Zaxid.net published an article arguing that Ukraine should respect 'linguistic needs of the residents of the East', which was criticized by the Ukrainian linguist Iryna Farion. In March 2022, Russia blocked access to the Zaxid.net website.
