= Sadova, Suceava =

Sadova German: Sadowa
- Commune
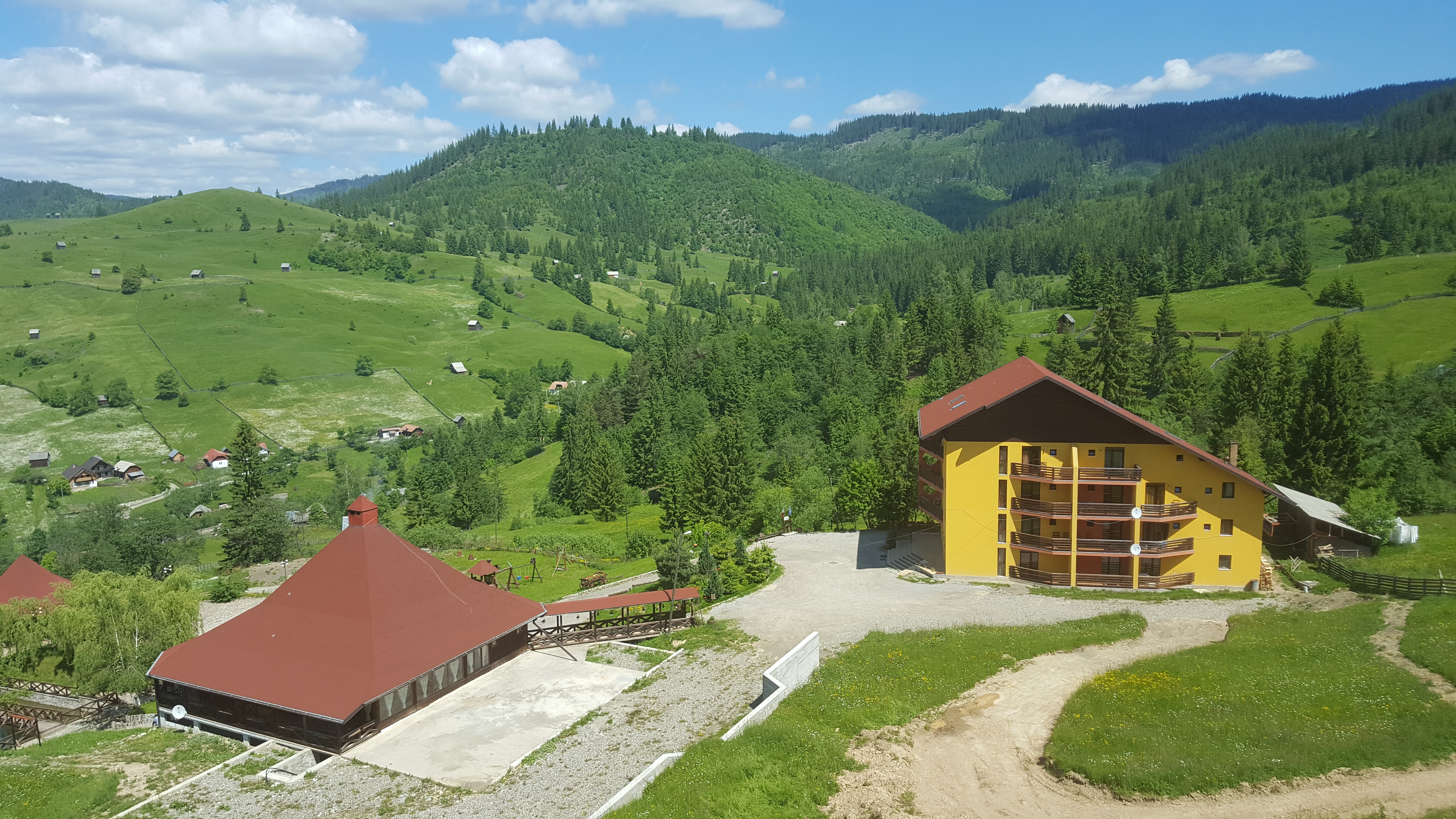
- Rural landscape in Sadova

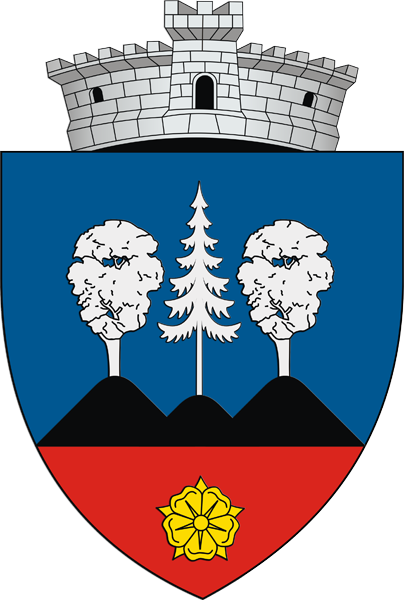
- Coat of arms

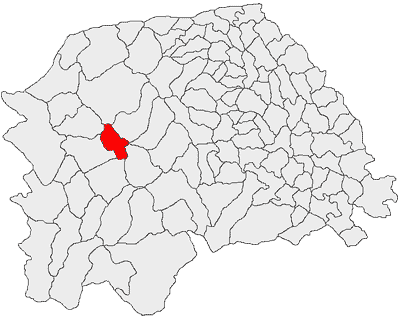
- Location in Suceava County

- Location in Romania
- Coordinates: 47°34′N 25°19′E
- Country: Romania
- County: Suceava

Government
  - Mayor (2024–2028): Otcu Mihai Constantinescu (PNL)
- Area: 67 km^{2} (26 sq mi)
- Elevation: 733 m (2,405 ft)
- Population (2021-12-01): 2,389
  - Density: 36/km^{2} (92/sq mi)
- Time zone: UTC+02:00 (EET)
  - Summer (DST): UTC+03:00 (EEST)
- Postal code: 727470
- Area code: (+40) x30
- Vehicle reg.: SV
- Website: comunasadova.ro

Sadova (German: Sadowa) is a commune located in Suceava County, in the historical region of Bukovina, northeastern Romania. It is composed of a single village, namely Sadova. In the past, that is from the modern period up until the mid-20th century, the commune was inhabited by a German minority, more specifically by Bukovina Germans (German: Bukowinadeutsche or Buchenlanddeutsche).

== Administration and local politics ==
=== Communal council ===
The commune's current local council has the following political composition, according to the results of the 2020 Romanian local elections:

Party	Seats	Current Council
National Liberal Party (PNL)	8	
People's Movement Party (PMP)	1	
Social Democratic Party (PSD)	1	
Independent politician (Zbranca Gavril)	1	

== Gallery ==
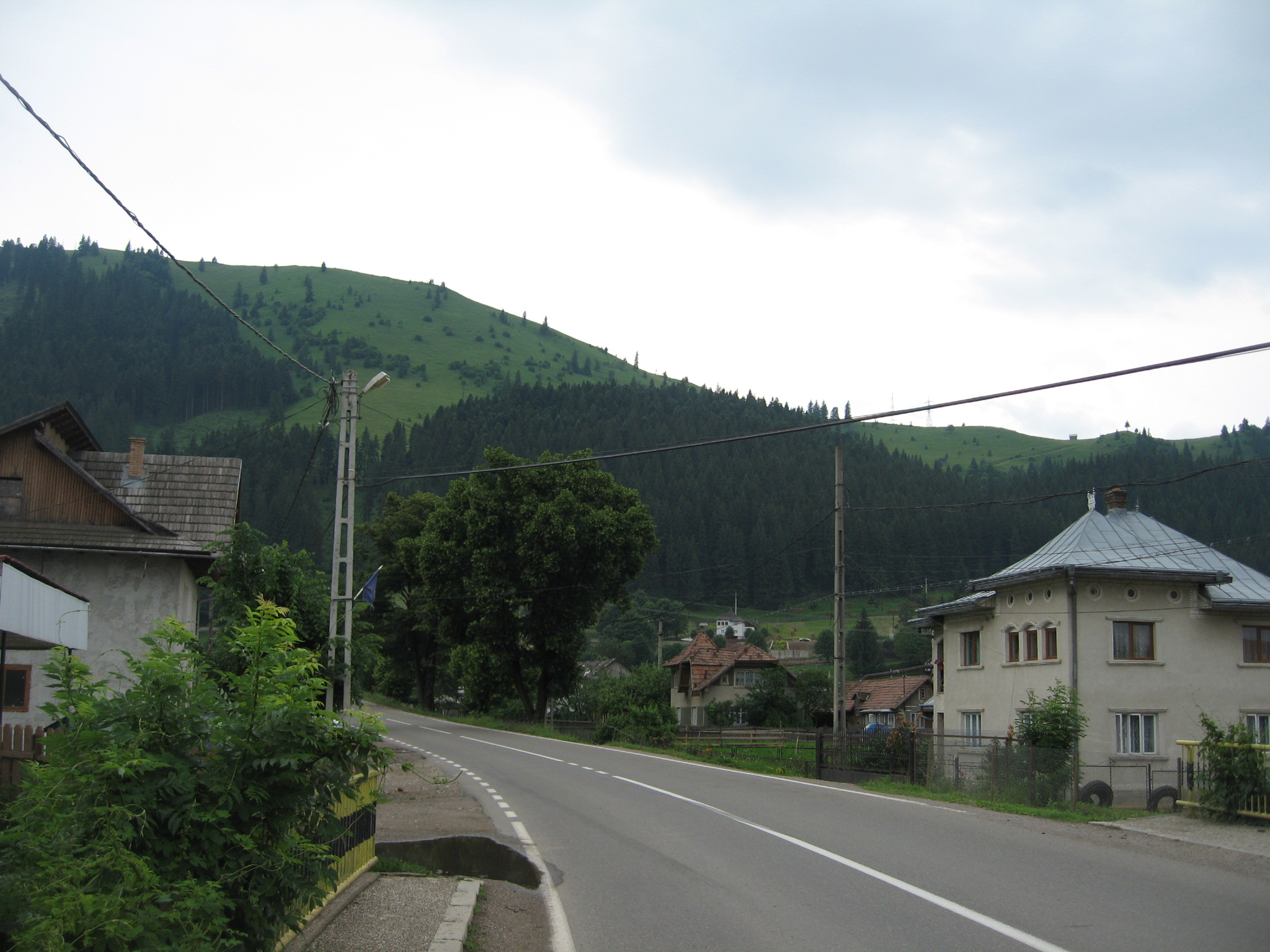
Landscape from Sadova, Suceava County, Romania

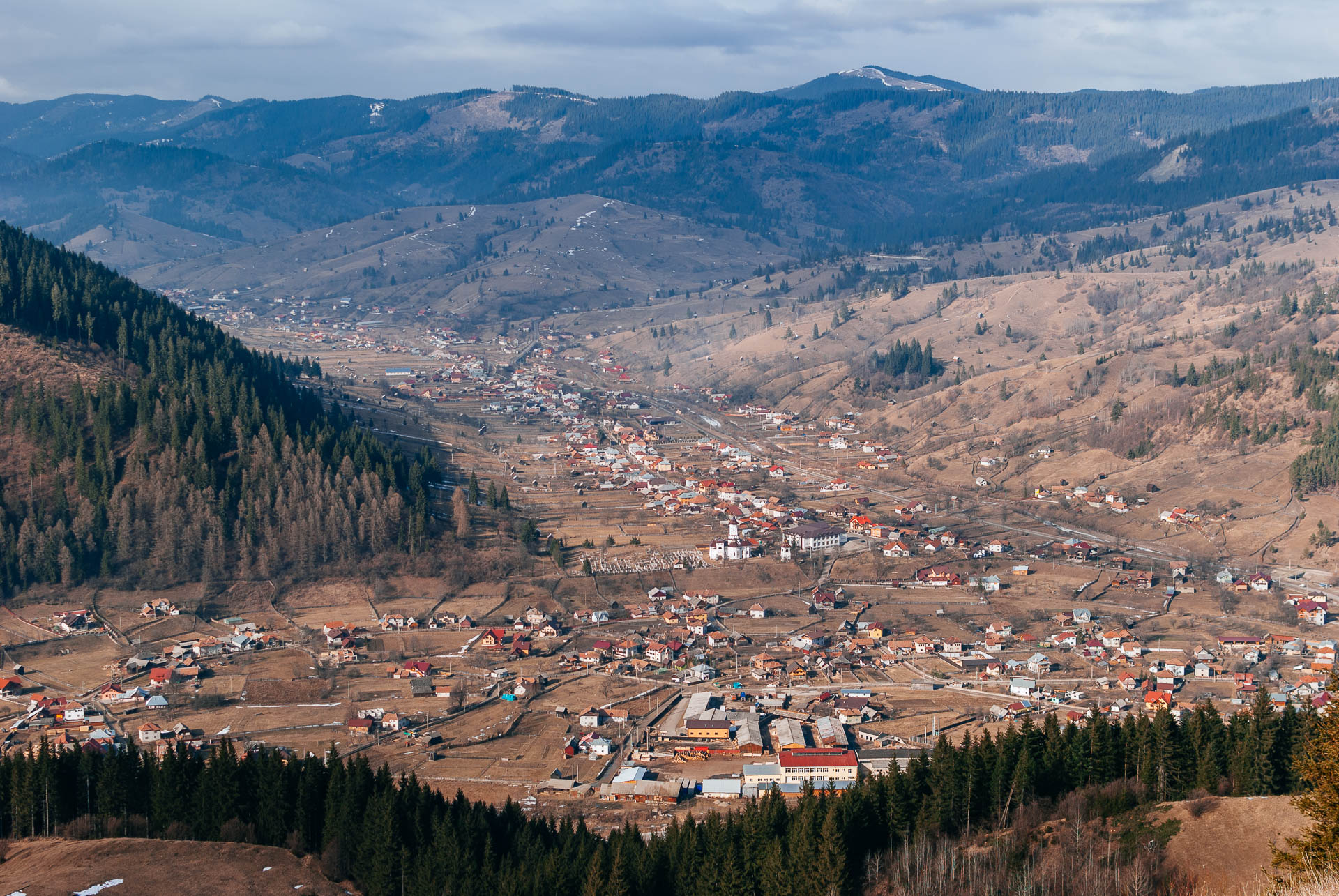
Panoramic view of Sadova

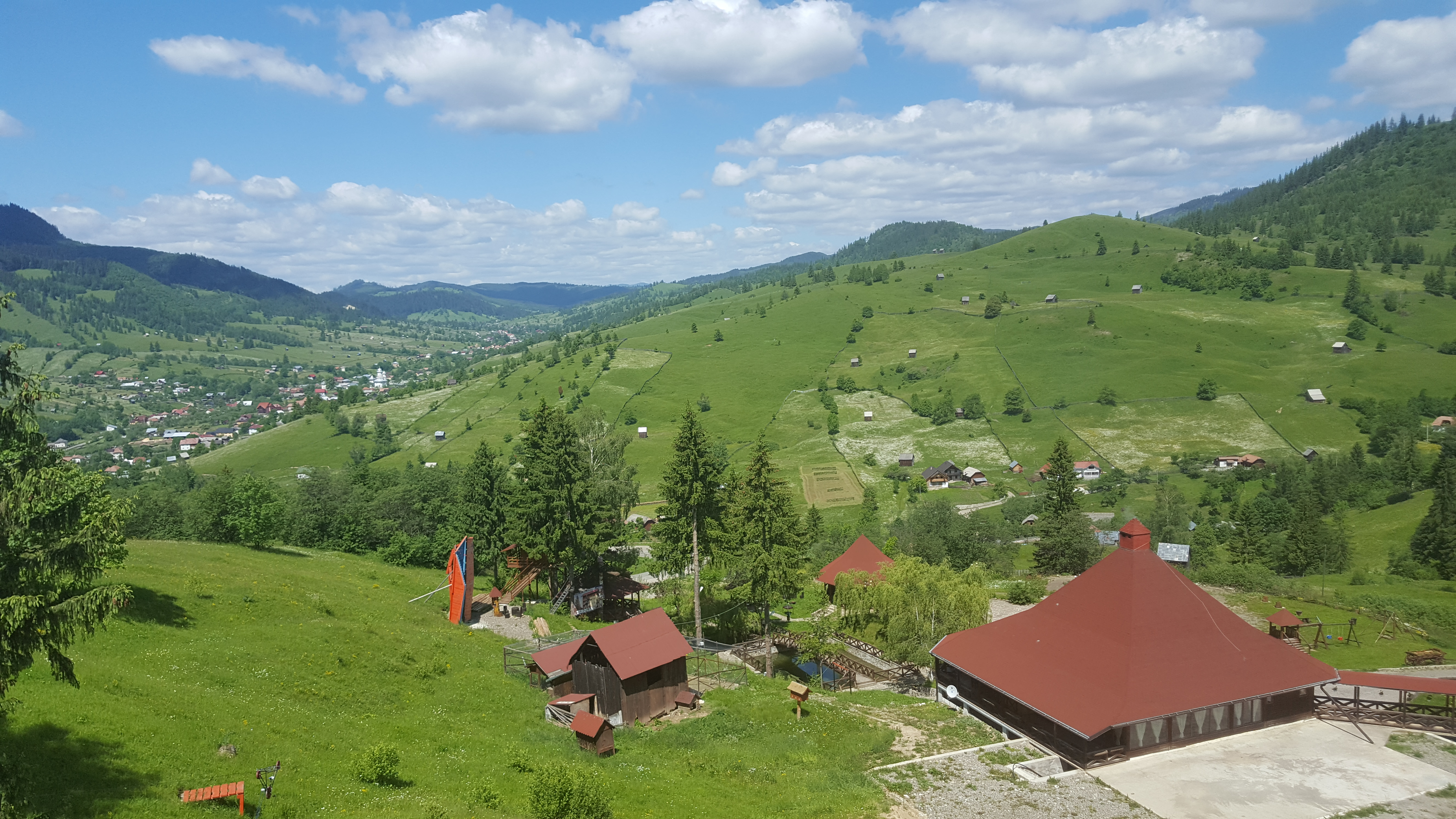
View over Sadova from a pension

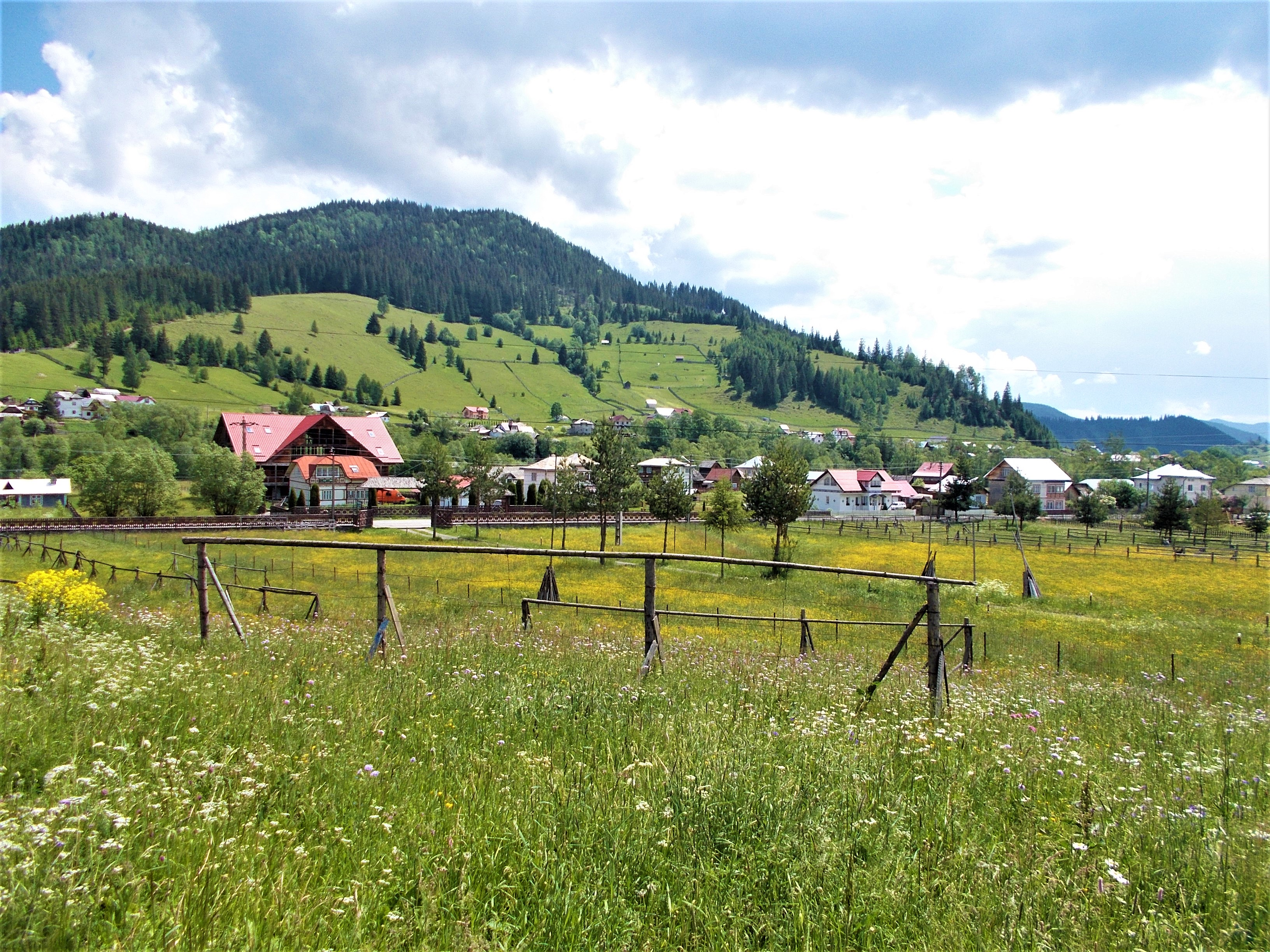
Landscape from Sadova

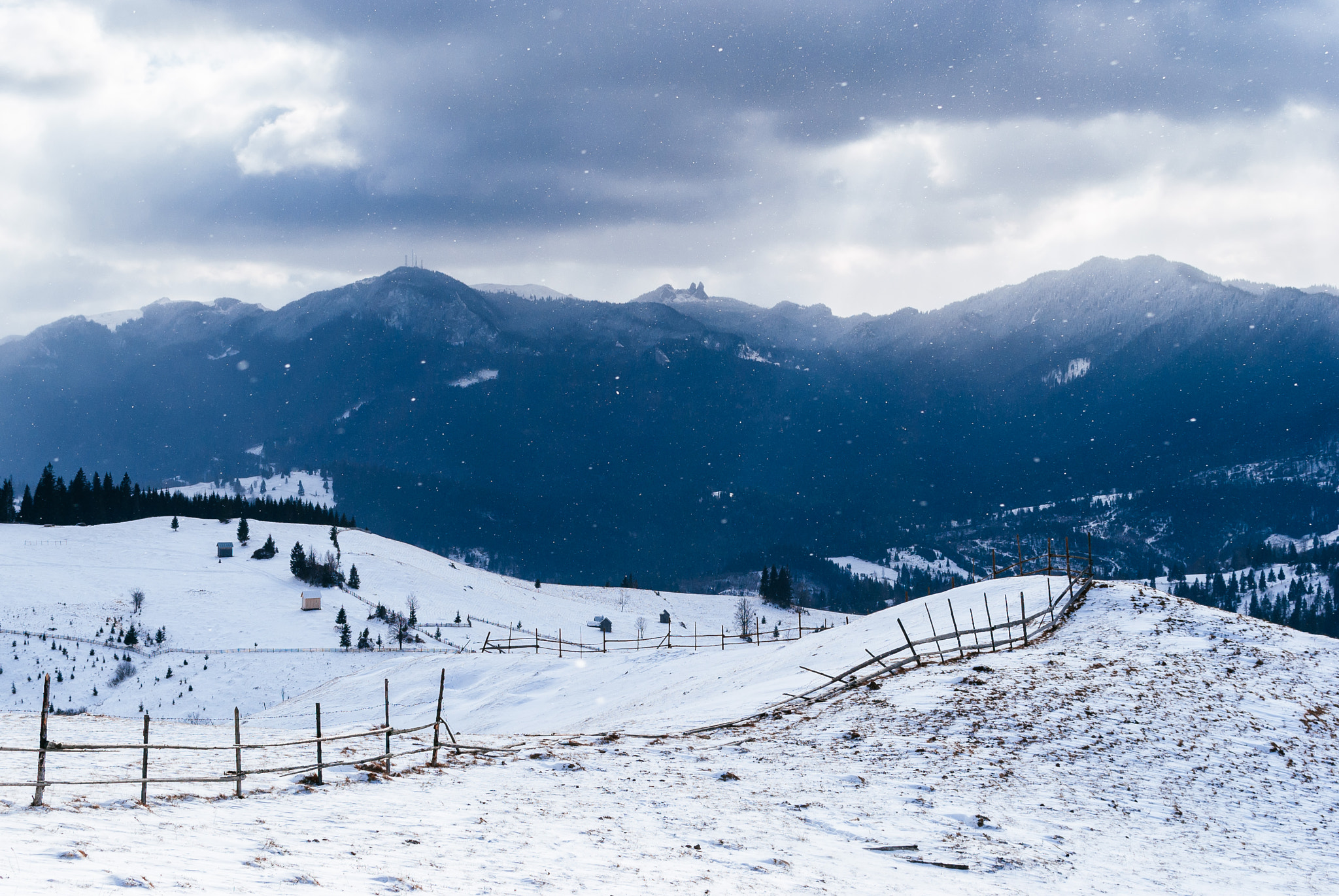
Winter in Sadova

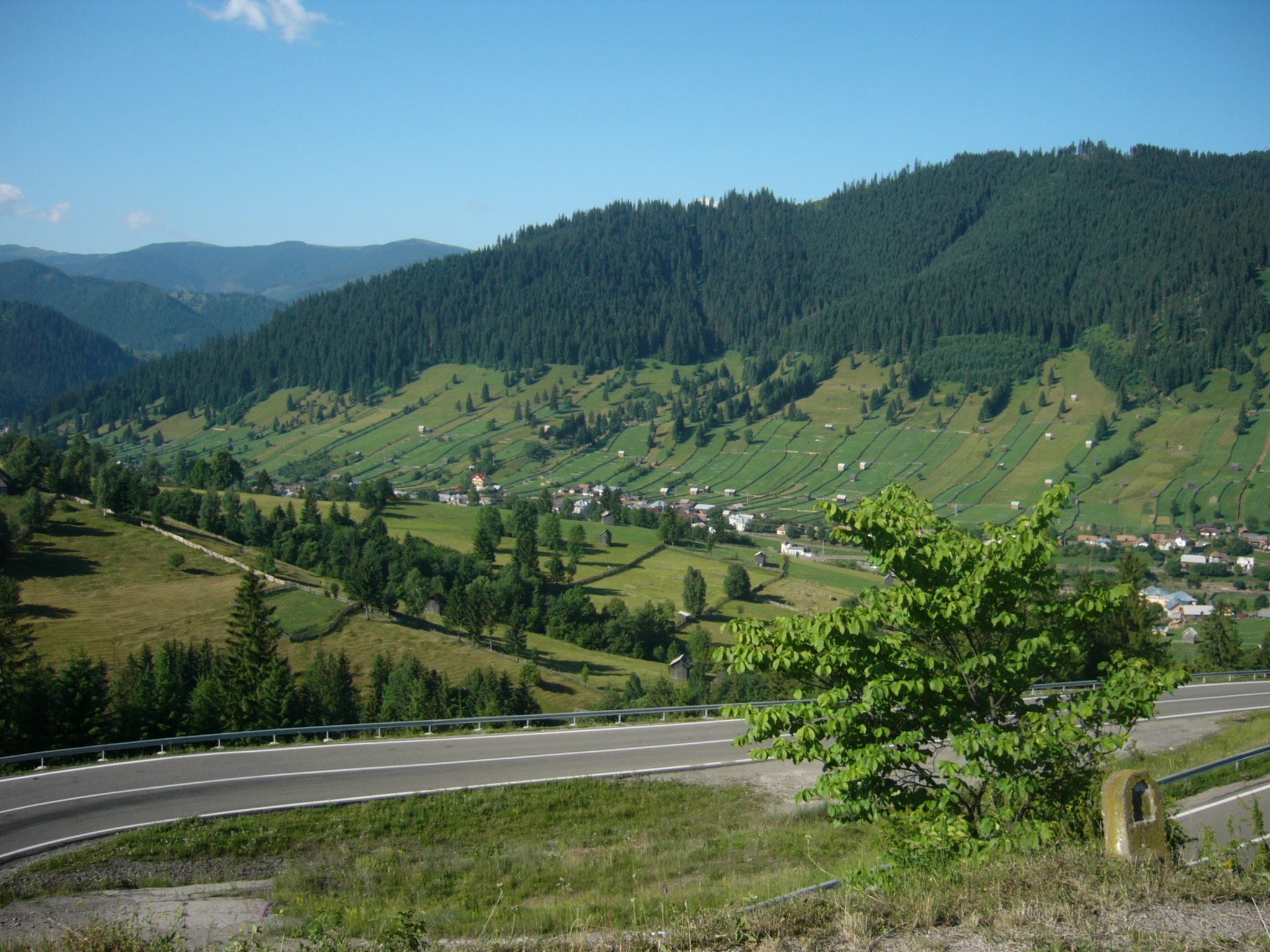
Overview of Sadova and its surroundings

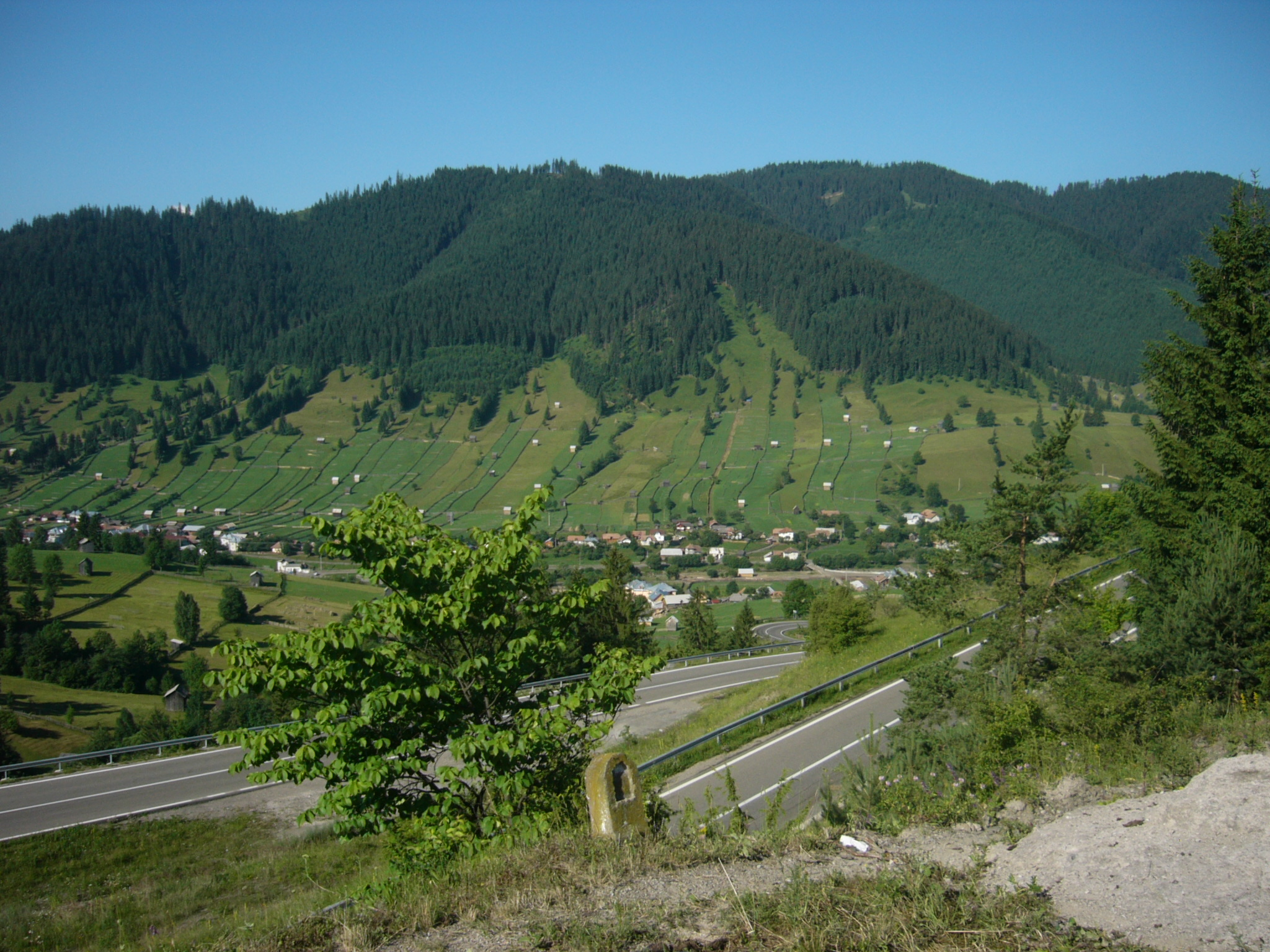
Overview of Sadova and its surroundings
