= 24 Kanal =

Ukrainian TV channel

- Country: Ukraine
- Headquarters: Kyiv, Ukraine

Programming
- Language: Ukrainian
- Picture format: 16:9 (576i, SDTV); 16:9 (1080i, HDTV)

Ownership
- Owner: Lux Television and Radio Company

History
- Launched: March 1st, 2006

Links
- Website: 24tv.ua

24 Kanal (Ukrainian: 24 Канал, lit. 'Channel 24') is a Ukrainian 24/7 TV channel. Originally called News Channel 24, it is the part of the Lux Television and Radio Company, a media conglomerate in Ukraine. Channel 24 programming covers politics, the economy, sports and celebrities. The station has been broadcasting continuously in Ukraine since 2006.

The channel is owned by TRK Lux Media which is controlled by Kateryna Kit-Sadova (the wife of Lviv Mayor Andriy Sadovyi).

== Ratings ==
Channel 24 was launched in March 2006. Its average share of daily viewership in Ukraine is 1.1%, and its Nielsen average is 0.17%.

== Schedule ==
News reports are broadcast daily every hour in the morning and every two hours in the afternoon and evening. On weekends, news reports are broadcast every two hours from 9 am until 10 pm (UTC+2).

== Internet presence ==
In October 2008, the TV channel launched 24tv.ua, a news and information website. Its editor-in-chief is Olha Konsevych. The website is regularly among the top twenty most visited websites in Ukraine, and among the top five most visited news websites in Ukraine.

Channel 24 has an official app available on Android and iOS devices.

== Satellite info ==
- Satellite — Amos 3/7
- Orbit position — 4°W
- Frequency — 11175 MHz
- Polarization — horizontal (H)
- SR — 30000
- FTA (Free To Air)
- FEC — 3/4
