= Andriy Sadovyi =

Ukrainian politician (born 1968)

- Андрій Садовий
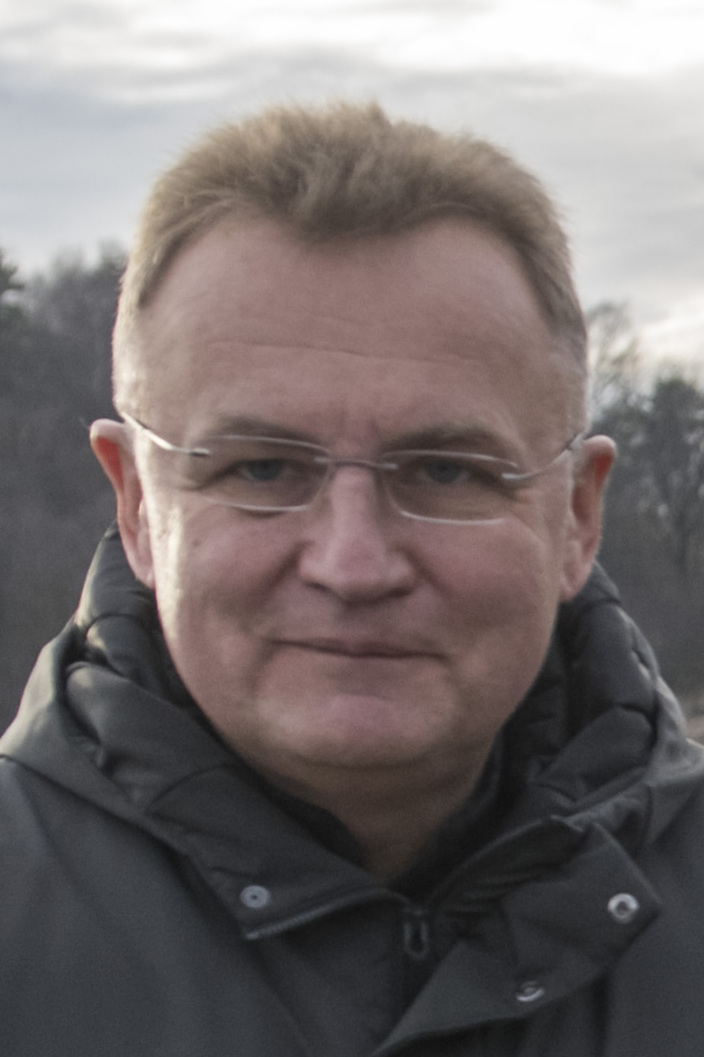
- Sadovyi in 2025

Mayor of Lviv
- Incumbent
- Assumed office 26 March 2006
- Preceded by: Zinoviy Siryk (acting)

Personal details
- Born: 19 August 1968 (age 58) Lviv, Ukrainian SSR, Soviet Union
- Party: Self Reliance (since 2013)
- Other political affiliations: Independent (2010—2013); Our Ukraine (2006—2010)
- Spouse: Kateryna Kit-Sadova
- Children: 5
- Education: Lviv Polytechnic; Academy of State Governance

Andriy Ivanovych Sadovyi (Ukrainian: Андрій Іванович Садовий; born 19 August 1968) is a Ukrainian politician and businessman who has served as the mayor of Lviv, the administrative centre of the Lviv Oblast of western Ukraine, since 2006.

He is the former leader of the Self Reliance political party, and co-founder of "Lux" media holding. Sadovyi was a candidate in the 2019 Ukrainian presidential election from 8 January until 1 March 2019, when he decided to withdraw.

== Early life and education ==
Andriy Sadovyi was born on 19 August 1968 in the city of Lviv. He graduated from the Lviv Technical School of Radioelectronics in 1987. He performed his military service from 1987 to 1989 in the Soviet Army.

Sadovyi graduated from Lviv Polytechnic in 1995 with a degree in electrical engineering, became qualified as an economist specializing in finance in 1997, and graduated from the National Academy for Public Administration under the President of Ukraine with a master's degree in public administration in 1999.

== Early career ==
In 1989, Andriy Sadovyi began working as an adjuster of radio-electronic devices at the Lvivprylad Manufacturers. In 1992–1995 he was a deputy director of the Lviv branch of Social Adaptation of Youth Fund under the auspices of the Cabinet of Ministers of Ukraine.

From 1997 to 2005 he was the chairman and head of the board of joint-stock company Pivden'zakhidelectromerezhbud. From 1997 to 2001 he was the head of the board of the Lviv District Development Fund. From 2002 to 2003 Sadovyi was a director of the Lviv Development Institute that publishes the Ukrainian-wide Misto journal. Since 2002, Sadovyi has been the head of the board of the joint-stock Radio&TV company TRK Lux. Since 2005 he has been the head of social organization Self Reliance.

== Mayor of Lviv (2006–) ==
On 26 March 2006, Sadovyi was elected the city mayor of Lviv. On 31 October 2010, he was re-elected for a second term to the post of mayor of Lviv. Andriy Sadovyi was a member of Our Ukraine until 2010. In the 2010 local elections he was elected as a nominee from the Republican Christian Party.

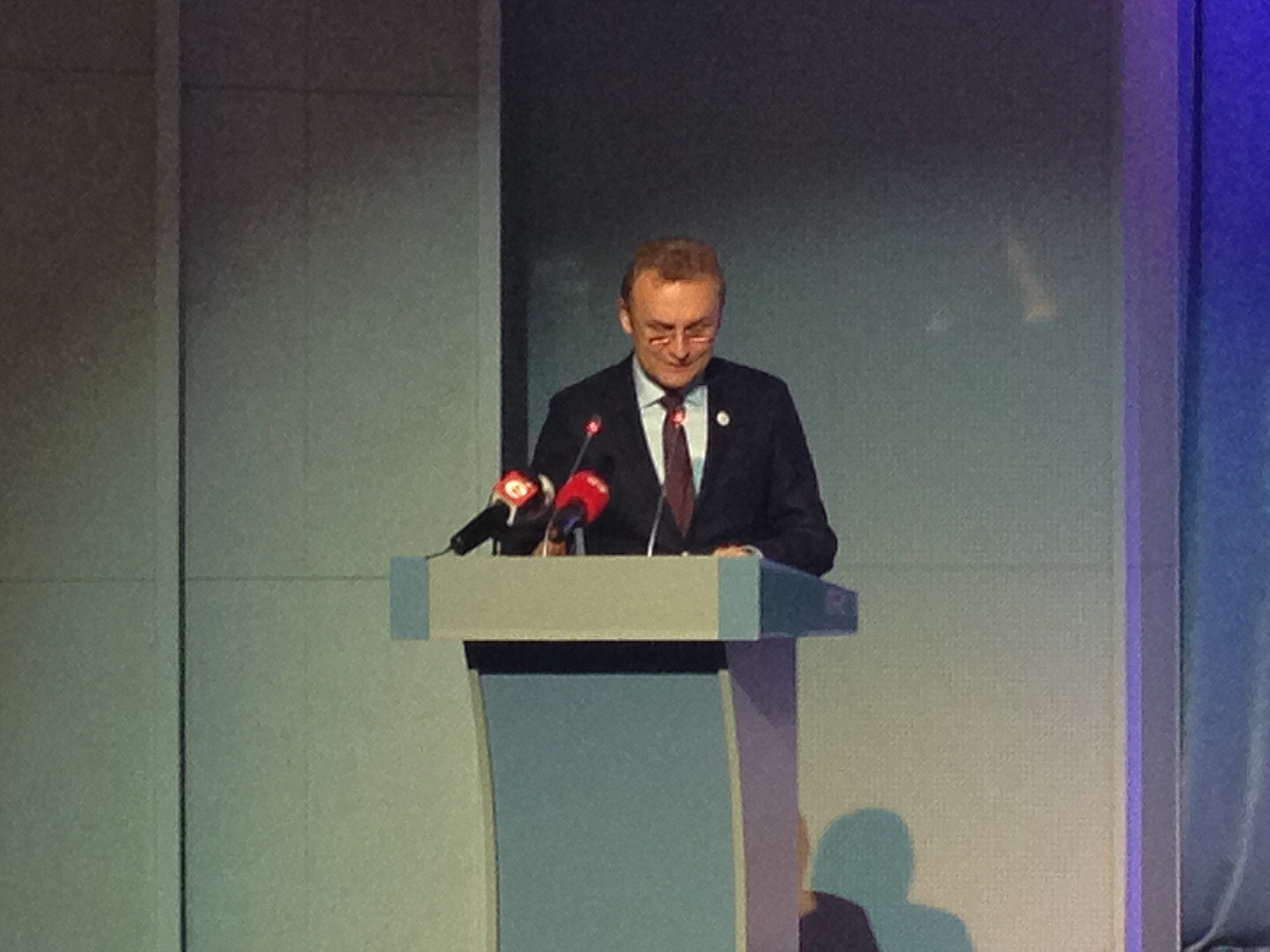
Sadovyi speaking at the party congress of Self Reliance, 2014

In October 2012, Sadovyi called for creating a new political party, Self Reliance, which was registered in late December 2012. The name stems from societies that existed before World War I in Galicia and which were revived after World War II as credit unions in the United States.

At 11:30 pm on 25 July 2014 Sadovyi's house was hit by a high-explosive anti-tank (HEAT) warhead of an RPG-18. The combatant who fired the RPG is unknown, and Sadovyi was not home at the time of the explosion, which damaged the roof, beams, and windows. At 8:45 pm on 26 December 2014, the house was hit again. On that day, Sadovy and his family were reportedly at the Bukovel Resort. Walls, windows and doors were damaged. At 10:50 pm on 29 October 2015, a grenade was thrown into the courtyard of the Sadovyi's house. Sadovyi and his family were at home at the time of the explosion, however nobody was hurt and no damage was caused. The attacker was arrested.

Led by Sadovyi, the party Self Reliance finished third in the Ukrainian parliamentary election in October 2014. The party won 33 seats. Sadovyi decided to remain as mayor of Lviv instead of taking a seat in parliament.

In the summer of 2016, the Lviv Gribovitsky landfill was closed on court-order, after a fire erupted on-site and claimed the lives of four. The closure led to the dumping of Lviv garbage inside the city and in other area not equipped for this purpose. In November 2016, Sadovyi launched a new tram route that connected the central part of the city with the Sykhiv district. On October 17, 2016, a Center for the provision of services to combatants was opened in Lviv. In addition, the Lviv City Council, at Sadovy's initiative, decided to allocate ₴400 million in 2017-2020 for material assistance to anti-terrorist operation participants, including ₴100,000 for each soldier; the city undertook to facilitate the allocation of land to anti-terrorist operation participants outside the city, or to provide monetary compensation, as well as to provide housing for the families of war victims, the seriously wounded and orphans. The decision was made by 53 votes "for", "against" 0.

In March 2017 Sadovyi announced the signing of a memorandum on the termination of Lviv's trash block. However, in June 2017, due to the severity of the problem – more than 9,000 tons of garbage had accumulated in and around the city – the issue was handed-over to the Lviv Regional State Administration for two years.

Self Reliance announced on 3 October 2018 that Sadovyi was their candidate in the 2019 Ukrainian presidential election. He was a candidate in the election from 8 January until 1 March 2019, when he decided to withdraw to support the candidacy of Anatoliy Hrytsenko. Hrytsenko had already asked Sadovyi about 1 year prior to support his candidacy, Sadovyi eventually withdrew from the presidential election due to his low rating in opinion polls. Registration of Sadovyi's candidacy was officially cancelled on 5 March 2019. In these election Hrytsenko did not proceed to the second round of the election; in the first round he placed fifth with 6.91% of the votes.

In the 2019 Ukrainian parliamentary election Self Reliance lost all its parliamentary seats except for one single seat won in a constituency. In October 2019 Oksana Syroyid succeeded Sadovyi as party leader of Self Reliance.

On 21 November 2019, the Special Anti-Corruption Prosecutor's Office of Ukraine announced they suspected Sadovyi of abuse of power. The stated that the Lviv city authorities had sold for $2.2 million a plot of land in Lviv Oblast that is not a part of the (city of) Lviv. According to the prosecutors, the plot was also sold at a lower cost than it should have been and without an auction, causing $3.86 million in monetary damages to the Riasne-Ruske village and the state. If found guilty, Sadovyi and other suspects could be sentenced from three to six years in prison.

During the COVID-19 pandemic in Ukraine Lviv mayor Sadovyi was accused of lack of preparedness of Lviv despite numerous photo opportunities with medical staff and equipment. A World Health Organization (WHO) team visiting Lviv in March 2020 were refused permission to establish a western Ukraine laboratory as Sadovyi and his staff wished to control data and information flow, contrary to WHO standards. Several media stories have highlighted serious shortcomings in Lviv city.

In March 2019, a dormitory for orphans was opened. In addition to accommodation, children can get professional legal and psychological assistance.

In March 2019 Sadovyi stated that he would not take part in the next election of mayor of Lviv. But in August 2020 he announced he would run for mayor of Lviv again in the October 2020 local elections. Sadovy was reelected in the second round of the Lviv mayoral election of 22 November 2020 with 62.25% of the vote (he had gained 40.09% in the first round). Runner up Oleh Synyutka got 37.75% of the vote.

In December 2024, Sadovyi became the first Ukrainian mayor to visit Taiwan. On his five-day visit to Taiwan, Sadovyi thanked the Taiwanese government for its new US$5 million donation to renovate a rehabilitation center in Lviv.

=== Criticism ===
For an extended period, Sadovyi has been unable to resolve the Lviv garbage crisis, which has led to periodic calls for his resignation.

In late 2017, former Lviv City Council member, Bohdan Pankevych, accused Sadovyi of not supporting the adoption of a resolution «regulating the language of service to citizens in the provision of services, trade, and information about goods and services, and the placement of advertising information.» Pankevych reported that the resolution was simply not included in the session’s agenda, as requested by Mayor Sadovyi.

The media holding "Lux, " owned by Sadovyi’s wife, has been accused by some activists of supporting russification.

Blogger and representative of the International Public Organization «Ukrainian Community» in Lviv, Yuri Sytnyk, as well as part of the Lviv community, link Andriy Sadovyi’s media career to deceiving the depositors of «Halytski Investments» joint-stock company, with which Andriy had connections, and gaining control over a significant number of enterprises in Lviv Oblast as a result.

Ihor Churkin, the owner of Lviv Bus Factory, states that Lviv’s mayor owes the plant 70 million hryvnias for 40 trolleybuses and buses and has not paid a single penny, leading to the actual halt of the plant’s production.

According to the information from Galician political analyst Yuri Sytnyk, the mayor of Lviv is associated with the Russian oligarch Mikhail Fridman, through whom he has connections to the Russian establishment.

In 2019, Andriy Sadovyi was accused of selling the city community’s land to the investment company STR at an undervalued price for the construction of an industrial park in 2015. The Specialized Anti-Corruption Prosecutor’s Office (SAP) claims that this deal caused damage to the state and citizens in the amount of over 93.5 million hryvnias.

In 2021, the National Agency on Corruption Prevention compiled and sent to court 14 administrative protocols against Andriy Sadovyi.

In 2021, one of the scandals that affected Andriy Sadovyi’s reputation was the international music festival Alfa Jazz Fest. The scandal arose due to the festival’s general sponsor, the company with Russian capital, «Alfa-Bank».

In 2023, Lviv City Council member, Oleksiy Reznik, and the editorial team of the Lviv information agency "Vholos, " filed a request with the State Bureau of Investigations demanding the opening of a criminal investigation regarding Mayor Andriy Sadovyi′s bonuses to his deputies. Statements were submitted about the need to initiate criminal proceedings related to Andriy Sadovyi’s activities.

== Personal life ==
He is married to Kateryna Kit-Sadova, and has five sons: Ivan, Tadey, Mykhailo, Yosyp and Anthony.

His wife owns large shares in various television and radio broadcasters (including Channel 24).

Sadovyi has been engaged in social activity since 1997. He is a founder and the head of a board of the social organization Lviv Development Institute, head of the Management Council of Metropolitan Andrey Sheptyts’kyi Art and Culture Fund of Greek Church of Ukraine (2000–2002), member of Ukrainian-Polish Cooperation Capital. In 2003, he was elected a deputy head of the "Mosty na Skhid" Institute Council (Poland).

== See also ==
- List of mayors of Lviv
