= 2019 Ukrainian presidential election =

Election of Volodymyr Zelenskyy

- 31 March 2019 (first round); 21 April 2019 (second round)
- Opinion polls
- Turnout: 62.88% (first round) ▲3.00pp 61.42% (second round)
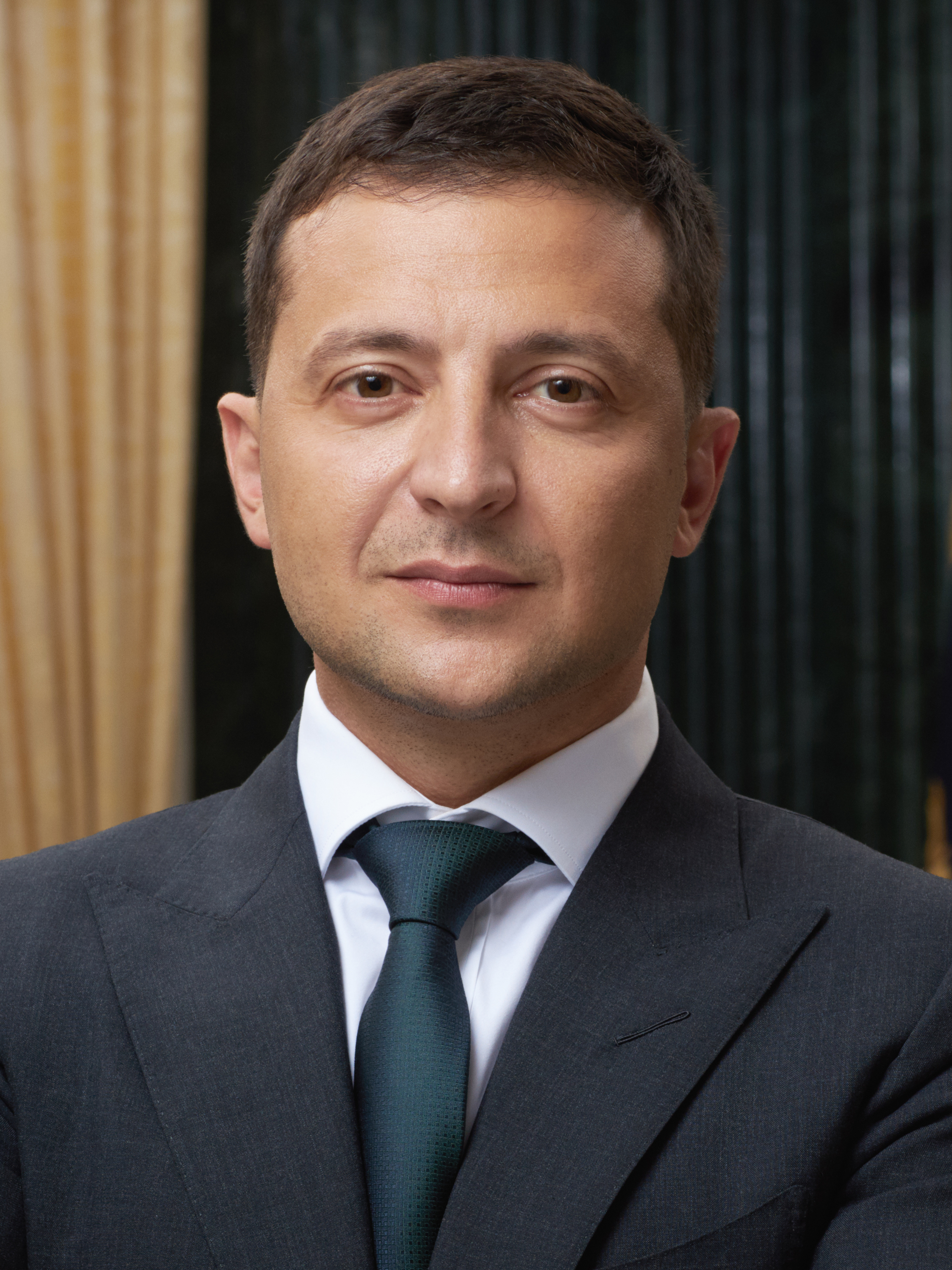

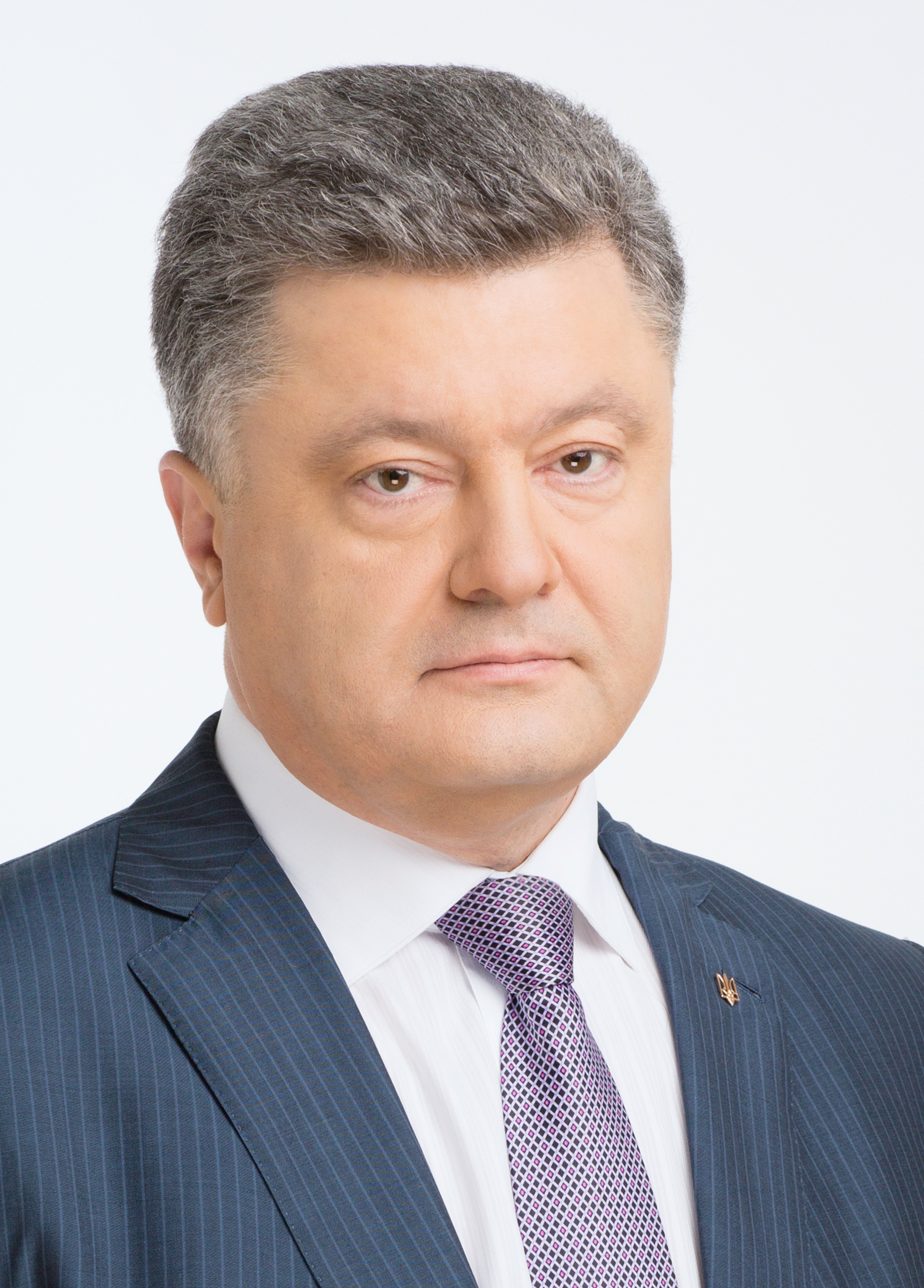
Nominee	Volodymyr Zelenskyy	Petro Poroshenko
Party	Servant of the People	Independent
Alliance		BPP
Popular vote	13,541,528	4,522,450
Percentage	74.96%	25.04%
President before election
Petro Poroshenko
BPP
Elected President
Volodymyr Zelenskyy
Servant of the People

Presidential elections were held in Ukraine on 31 March 2019. As none of the 39 candidates on the ballot received an absolute majority of the initial vote, a runoff was held on 21 April between the top two vote-getters: Volodymyr Zelenskyy, a television personality, and Petro Poroshenko, the incumbent president. The Central Election Commission (CEC) announced that Zelenskyy won the second round with 73.22% of the total vote (or 74.96% of the valid vote). The elections were recognized as free and fair by the Organization for Security and Co-operation in Europe.

Poroshenko became the third incumbent Ukrainian president to directly lose reelection, after Viktor Yushchenko in 2010 and Leonid Kravchuk in 1994 (only Leonid Kuchma has ever won reelection, in 1999). Zelenskyy was sworn in as the sixth President of Ukraine in May 2019.

== Background ==
According to Ukrainian law, the election of the President of Ukraine must take place on the last Sunday of March of the fifth year of the term of the incumbent president which in this cycle fell on 31 March 2019. The Ukrainian parliament had to approve the date of the presidential election no later than 100 days before the election day which it did on 26 November 2018.

== Candidates ==
According to Ukrainian law, a presidential candidate must be a citizen of Ukraine who is at least 35 years old, can speak the (state) Ukrainian language and has lived in Ukraine for the last ten years prior to election day. Candidates were nominated by a political party, or by self-nomination. Candidates also had to submit a declaration of income for the year preceding the election year. This document was then scrutinized by the National Agency for Prevention of Corruption, which subsequently published the results of the audit. Nominations could be submitted from 31 December 2018 to 4 February 2019. The end of the registration period was 9 February 2019. After a potential candidate provided the required documentation to the CEC, this body had five days to register the candidate or to refuse to do so.

Candidates were required to pay a nomination deposit of ₴2.5 million (approx. US$90,000); only the two candidates that progressed to the second round of voting would get this deposit back (the other deposits would be transferred to the state treasury).

By the end of the registration period on 9 February 2019, the CEC had registered 44 candidates for the elections. This meant that the largest number of candidates participated in the elections. In total, 92 people submitted documents to the CEC to participate in the elections. Five candidates withdrew. The CEC refused to register 47 people, most for their failure to pay the deposit.

Candidates could withdraw their candidacy, but not later than 23 days before the election. On 8 March, the CEC approved the final list of candidates. There were a total of 39 candidates for the first round of the election.

=== Registered candidates ===
Name	Party	Nomination	Position(s)	Registration	Notes
Ihor Shevchenko	Independent	Self-nominated	Minister of Ecology and Natural Resources (2014–2015)	4 January 2019	Shevchenko had declared his intention for candidacy on 13 November 2018, but also stated he would not participate in the elections if a new candidate appears who "better meets the requirements." He submitted documents to the CEC for registration as a presidential candidate on 31 December 2018 (which was also the first day of the electoral campaign).
Serhiy Kaplin	Independent	Social Democratic Party	People's Deputy of Ukraine (2012–2019); Leader of the Social Democratic Party (2015–2018)	8 January 2019	In October 2017, Kaplin had already stated his intention to take part of the election as the leader of the Socialist Party of Ukraine. But the legal chairman of this party was Illia Kyva. He filed documents to the CEC for registration as a presidential candidate on 3 January 2019.
Vitaliy Skotsyk	Independent	Self-nominated	Leader of the Agrarian Party of Ukraine (2014–2018)	8 January 2019	Skotysyk filed documents with the CEC 3 January 2019 for registration as the Agrarian Party of Ukraine's presidential candidate. But the next day the Agrarian Party stated he had been expelled from the party the previous September for "actions that harm the authority and discredit the governing body of the party and the party as a whole".
Valentyn Nalyvaichenko	Spravedlyvist	Spravedlyvist	Head of the Security Service of Ukraine (2006–2010, 2014–2015); People's Deputy of Ukraine (2012–2014); Leader of Spravedlyvist (2016–2019)	8 January 2019	Nominated by his party on 3 January 2019.
Vitalii Kuprii	Independent	Self-nominated	People's Deputy of Ukraine (2014–2019)	15 January 2019	
Anatoliy Hrytsenko	Civil Position	Civil Position	Minister of Defence (2005–2007); Leader of Civil Position (2008–2019)	15 January 2019	Civil Position nominated Hrytsenko as a candidate on 11 January. His candidacy is supported by the European Party of Ukraine, Native Land, Alternative and Wave. Andriy Sadovyi and Dmytro Gnap withdrew their candidacies in a bid to support Hrytsenko. On 5 March, Hrytsenko said he was in talks with five other candidates (Smeshko, Koshulynskyi, Dobrodomov, Bezsmertnyi and Kryvenko) on joining forces in the election.
Hennadiy Balashov	5.10	5.10	People's Deputy of Ukraine (1998–2002)	18 January 2019	On 21 May 2018, Balashov released a video on his official website titled "Will Balashov Run for President?" in which he asks the audience if they're "capable of raising money" for his campaign, yet doesn't say whether he will participate in the election. On 19 September 2018 he clearly announced his intention to run on behalf of his party 5.10.
Olha Bohomolets	Independent	Self-nominated	People's Deputy of Ukraine (2014–2019)	18 January 2019	Candidate in the 2014 Ukrainian presidential election.
Oleksandr Shevchenko	UKROP	UKROP	People's Deputy of Ukraine (2014–2019)	21 January 2019	
Roman Nasirov	Independent	Self-nominated	Head of the State Fiscal Service (2015–2017); People's Deputy of Ukraine (2014–2015)	22 January 2019	
Yuriy Boyko	Opposition Bloc	Self-nominated (Note: De facto nominated by the Opposition Platform — For Life.)	Deputy Prime Minister of Ukraine (2012–2014); People's Deputy of Ukraine (2007–2010, 2014–present); Minister of Fuel and Energy (2006–2007, 2012–2014)	22 January 2019	Candidate for the Opposition Platform — For Life alliance. His nomination was announced on 17 November. Because Opposition Platform – For life was not yet registered as a party in January 2019 it could not nominate him as a presidential candidate.
Yulia Tymoshenko	Batkivshchyna	Batkivshchyna	People's Deputy of Ukraine (1997–2000, 2002–2005, 2006–2007, 2014–present); Prime Minister of Ukraine (2005; 2007–2010); Leader of the Batkivshchyna (1999–present)	25 January 2019	In October 2017, Tymoshenko announced that she intended to participate. On 20 June 2018 she officially declared that she would take part in the election. On 16 March fellow candidate Serhiy Taruta pledged his campaign team would support Tymoshenko, however, his name was not taken off the ballot. She was endorsed by the Peasant Party of Ukraine.
Oleh Liashko	Radical Party of Oleh Liashko	Radical Party of Oleh Liashko	People's Deputy of Ukraine (2006–2019); Leader of the Radical Party of Oleh Liashko (2011–present)	25 January 2019	
Oleksandr Vilkul	Opposition Bloc – Party for Development and Peace	Opposition Bloc – Party for Development and Peace	People's Deputy of Ukraine (2006–2010, 2014–2019); Deputy Prime Minister of Ukraine (2012–2014); Governor of the Dnipropetrovsk Oblast (2010–2012)	25 January 2019	Nominated by Opposition Bloc – Party for Development and Peace (the recently renamed Industrial Party of Ukraine) on 20 January 2019. Vilkul had been already nominated by his party Opposition Bloc on 17 December 2018. But a Ukrainian court ruled three days before (in response to a lawsuit filed by People's Deputy of Ukraine for OB Serhiy Larin) that OB's congress at which Vikul was to be nominated could not "reorganize the party by any means". On 18 December 2018, the website of OB stated that therefore all the decisions made at the congress were invalid.
Arkadiy Kornatskiy	Independent	Self-nominated	People's Deputy of Ukraine (2014–2019)	25 January 2019	
Oleksandr Moroz	Socialist Party of Oleksandr Moroz	Socialist Party of Oleksandr Moroz	Chairman of the Verkhovna Rada (1994–1998, 2006–2007); Leader of the Socialist Party of Ukraine (1991–2011); Leader of the Socialist Party of Oleksandr Moroz (2016–present); People's Deputy of Ukraine (1990–2007)	25 January 2019	Declared his candidacy on 11 December 2018.
Illia Kyva	Socialist Party of Ukraine	Socialist Party of Ukraine	Leader of the Socialist Party of Ukraine (2017–2019)	25 January 2019	Kyva was nominated by his party on 3 November 2018.
Ruslan Koshulynskyi	Svoboda	Svoboda	Deputy Chairman of the Verkhovna Rada of Ukraine (2012–2014); People's Deputy of Ukraine (2012–2014)	28 January 2019	On 14 October 2018, Oleh Tyahnybok, chairman of the party All-Ukrainian Union Svoboda, announced he would not be running for president and that the party had instead decided to nominate Koshulynskyi as the candidate of nationalist political forces. On 19 November 2018, fellow Ukrainian nationalist political organizations Organization of Ukrainian Nationalists, Congress of Ukrainian Nationalists, Right Sector and C14 endorsed Koshulynskyi's candidacy.
Oleksandr V. Danylyuk	Spilna Sprava	Self-nominated	Advisor of the Minister of Defense (2014)	28 January 2019	
Serhiy Taruta	Osnova	Osnova	People's Deputy of Ukraine (2014–present); Governor of Donetsk Oblast (2014); Leader of Osnova (2017–2019)	29 January 2019	Taruta was nominated by Osnova on 22 September 2018. He withdrew from the running on 16 March to support Yulia Tymoshenko, however, his name will feature on the ballot.
Volodymyr Zelenskyy	Independent	Servant of the People	Showman, screenwriter, actor, and art-director of Kvartal 95	30 January 2019	Announced his candidacy during his comedy show on 31 December 2018.
Ihor Smeshko	Strength and Honor	Self-nominated	Head of the Security Service of Ukraine (2003–2005); Advisor to the President of Ukraine (2014–2019)	30 January 2019	Announced his intention to run on 13 January 2019.
Inna Bohoslovska	Independent	Self-nominated	People's Deputy of Ukraine (1998–2002, 2007–2014); Leader of the Viche (2001–2007)	30 January 2019	
Mykola Haber	Patriotic Party of Ukraine	Self-nominated	People's Deputy of Ukraine (1998–2002); Leader of the Patriotic Party of Ukraine (1998–present)	1 February 2019	
Yuriy Derevyanko	Volia	Volia	People's Deputy of Ukraine (2012–2019)	1 February 2019	Nominated by the party Volia on 27 January.
Roman Bezsmertnyi	Independent	Self-nominated	Ambassador of Ukraine to Belarus (2010–2011); Deputy Prime Minister of Ukraine (2005–2006); People's Deputy of Ukraine (1998–2005, 2006–2007)	4 February 2019	Declared his candidacy on 31 May 2018.
Viktor Bondar	Revival	Revival	People's Deputy of Ukraine (2014–present); Leader of the Revival (2015–2019)	4 February 2019	Filed documents to the CEC on 31 January.
Viktor Kryvenko	People's Movement of Ukraine	People's Movement of Ukraine	People's Deputy of Ukraine (2014–2019); Leader of the People's Movement of Ukraine (2017–2021)	5 February 2019	Kryvenko was chosen as the People's Movement of Ukraine candidate on 10 January 2019.
Ruslan Rihovanov	Independent	Self-nominated	Acting Head of Sevastopol Sea Fishing Port	5 February 2019	
Serhiy Nosenko	Independent	Self-nominated	Investment consultant	5 February 2019	
Vasyl Zhuravlev	Stability	Stability	Leader of the Stability (2016–present)	6 February 2019	
Andriy Novak	Patriot	Patriot	Chairman of the Committee of Economists of Ukraine (2010–present); Leader of the Ukrainian Party (2012–2013)	6 February 2019	Nominated by the Patriot party on 24 January 2019.
Yurii Tymoshenko	Independent	Self-nominated	People's Deputy of Ukraine (2014–2019)	6 February 2019	Yulia Tymoshenko called for Yurii Tymoshenko's registration to be annulled because they share the same surname and initials, which could confuse voters. On 6 March, two individuals were arrested for attempting to bribe Yurii Tymoshenko to withdraw from the elections.
Petro Poroshenko	Independent (Note: The President of Ukraine is expected to be independent, and suspend all political activities during his term, and thus officially, Poroshenko was unaffiliated and self-nominated candidate, however, de facto he remained the BPP member, and was formally nominated by the party during its forum on 29 January 2019.)	Self-nominated	President of Ukraine (2014–2019); Minister of Economic Development and Trade (2012); Minister of Foreign Affairs (2009–2010); Secretary of the National Security and Defense Council of Ukraine (2005); People's Deputy of Ukraine (1998–2014, 2019–present)	7 February 2019	In July 2018, the deputy head of Poroshenko's parliamentary bloc announced that an election campaign team had been formed for Poroshenko, and that it was very likely that he would participate in the elections. Poroshenko announced his participation in the elections on 29 January 2019. Serhiy Krivonos withdrew his candidacy in support of Poroshenko.
Yurii Karmazin	Motherland Defenders Party	Self-nominated	People's Deputy of Ukraine (1994–2006, 2007–2012)	7 February 2019	
Yulia Lytvynenko	Independent	Self-nominated	Journalist; TV presenter	7 February 2019	
Oleksandr Vashchenko	Independent	Self-nominated	Economist	7 February 2019	
Volodymyr Petrov	Independent	Self-nominated	Political analyst YouTuber	7 February 2019	Candidate in the 2012 Ukrainian parliamentary election. At the time of registration, Petrov was under house arrest and being investigated for alleged harassment of a female student.
Oleksandr Solovyev	Reasonable Force	Reasonable Force	Leader of the Reasonable Force (2016–present)	8 February 2019	The CEC initially refused to register him on 2 February because a point in his election manifesto was interpreted as "encroaching on Ukraine's territorial integrity." After making corrections to his manifesto, he resubmitted documents and was registered.

=== Candidates who withdrew ===
- Andriy Sadovyi: Mayor of Lviv; his party Self Reliance announced on 3 October 2018 that Sadovyi was its candidate in the election. The CEC registered Sadovyi as a candidate on 8 January. In February Sadovyi talked about withdrawing his candidacy in favour of supporting Anatoliy Hrytsenko as a united candidate from "democratic, anti-corruption forces". He made the decision to withdraw on 1 March and declared his support for Hrytsenko.
- Dmytro Gnap: Journalist; Gnap was nominated by the party Power of the People on 20 January, and became a registered candidate on 8 February. He withdrew from the election on 2 March, also in favor of Anatoliy Hrytsenko.
- Serhiy Krivonos: veteran of the War in Donbas; Krivonos was nominated by the party Soldiers of the Anti-Terrorist Operation and subsequently registered by the CEC on 5 February. On 6 March he announced that he was withdrawing from the elections to support incumbent president Petro Poroshenko.
- Yevheniy Murayev: People's Deputy of Ukraine; on 10 January 2019, Murayev's party Nashi nominated him for president. The CEC registered his candidacy on 15 January. On 7 March he pulled out of the election in favor of Oleksandr Vilkul. He also announced that Vilkul's Opposition Bloc and Nashi would soon merge.
- Dmytro Dobrodomov: People's Deputy of Ukraine and leader of the People's Control Party was a registered candidate since 25 January. He withdrew from the election on 7 March in favor of Anatoliy Hrytsenko.

=== Registration denied ===
The CEC rejected 47 applications (mostly for failure to pay the deposit of ₴2.5 million) of potential candidates, including:

- Petro Symonenko: Leader of the Communist Party of Ukraine. His nomination was announced at the party's congress on 1 December 2018. Legally the Communist Party of Ukraine is not banned, but the Ministry of Justice is allowed to prohibit it from participating in elections. The CEC refused to register him as a candidate on 2 February because the statute, name, and symbolism of the Communist Party of Ukraine did not comply with 2015 decommunization laws.
- Nadiya Savchenko: People's Deputy of Ukraine and Hero of Ukraine. Savchenko was nominated by her party on 26 January 2019. Her bid to become a candidate was rejected by the CEC on 7 February because she failed to pay the deposit and her party didn't stamp the document regarding her nomination.

=== Potential candidates who declined to run ===
- Andriy Biletsky: People's Deputy of Ukraine and leader of political party National Corps; nominated by his party on 20 November 2018. Biletsky later said that he had no intention of participating in the "farce" of a presidential election.
- Vadim Rabinovich: People's Deputy of Ukraine and businessman. On 15 November 2018 Rabinovich announced he would not take part in the presidential election; but that he would top his party's For Life list in the following 2019 Ukrainian parliamentary elections.
- Oleh Tyahnybok: Chairman of the party All-Ukrainian Union Svoboda. On 14 October 2018, he announced that he would not be running for president and that the party had instead decided to nominate Koshulynskyi as the candidate of Ukraine's nationalist political forces.
- Michel Tereshchenko: Tereshchenko stepped down as mayor of Hlukhiv on 1 October 2018 to become a candidate. Yet, during the November–30 December-day martial law in Ukraine he resumed his position as mayor and on 3 January 2019 declared his support for candidate Andriy Sadovyi during a congress of Sadovyi's party Self Reliance.
- Svyatoslav Vakarchuk, lead vocalist of the rock band Okean Elzy. At the end of January 2019, Vakarchuk released a video in which he announced that he would not be running for president. Vakarchuk has said he does not back any of the candidates. According to an early March 2019 poll by sociological group "RATING" 64% of the electorate would have liked to see Vakarchuk among the presidential candidates. On 27 March 2019, Vakarchuk posted a video on his Facebook page calling on Ukrainians to think seriously about voting, and not to vote "for a laugh"; this was met with a response by the campaign team of presidential candidate Volodymyr Zelenskyy, who Vakarchuk's comments appeared to be directed towards.
- Mykhailo Dobkin: People's Deputy of Ukraine, former Kharkiv mayor and Governor of Kharkiv Oblast.

== Campaign ==
Analysis of candidates by the Ukrainian NGO "Chesno" found that Poroshenko had the largest campaign fund (₴415 million, about $15.4 million), followed by Yulia Tymoshenko with ₴320 million, Zelenskyy with ₴102.8 million, and Serhiy Taruta with ₴98.4 million. By comparison, in the 2010 Ukrainian presidential election, then winner Viktor Yanukovych spent over $40 million and runner-up Tymoshenko spent $36 million.

During the 2019 Ukrainian presidential election, various Ukrainian television channels supported a candidate for President of Ukraine.

Five groups supported Poroshenko:

- Petro Poroshenko's Channel 5 and Pryamiy supported Poroshenko and were very critical of Volodymyr Zelenskyy and Yulia Tymoshenko.
- Dmytro Firtash's very powerful Inter supported Yuriy Boyko and Poroshenko.
- Rinat Akhmetov's TRK Ukraina, which is owned by Akhmetov's System Capital Management Holdings, supported Poroshenko, Oleh Liashko, and Oleksandr Vilkul. Akhmetov's Opposition Bloc nominated Vilkul.
- Pro-Russia Viktor Medvedchuk's Channel 112 and NewsOne supported Poroshenko, Liashko, and Boyko. Medvedchuk's Opposition Platform — For Life nominated Boyko. The godfather of Medvedchuk's daughter is Vladimir Putin.
- Petro Dyminskyi's ZIK supported Poroshenko's allies allowing them to explain their story while they were under investigation.

Three TV groups were very critical of Poroshenko:

- Ihor Kolomoisky's 1+1 media group supported Volodymyr Zelenskyy. Zelenskyy worked for Kolomoisky's channel. According to an analysis by Ukrainian NGO Detektor Media by September 2020 1+1 was not supporting (if not hostile to) Zelenskyy and his Servant of the People party. Detektor Media claimed it was instead promoting For the Future.
- Andriy Sadovyi's Channel 24, supported Anatoliy Hrytsenko and opposed Poroshenko.
- Pro-Russia Yevheniy Murayev's Nash TV supported pro-Russia Vilkul and was against Poroshenko but neutral to Tymoshenko and Liashko.

Under the state-owned National Public Broadcasting Company, UA:Pershyi was critical of Poroshenko.

Victor Pinchuk's ICTV, Novyi Kanal and STB were neutral.

=== Debates ===
==== "not DEBATES" ====
As a part election coverage, private Ukrainian TV channel ZIK decided to create a series of debates from 19 February until 28 March day every week. The channel broadcast a total of 7 episodes with 29 out of 30 invited candidates.

==== "Espreso: Debates" ====
As a part election coverage, private Ukrainian TV channel Espreso TV decided to create a series of debates from 1 March until election day every week. The channel broadcast a total of 5 episodes with 11 out of 12 invited candidates.

==== "The Countdown" ====
UA:PBC organized a series of debates as a part of political talk show "The Countdown", where they invited 18 top rated candidates according to various polls. According to the format, each episode intended to have 3 candidates and a panel of experts, journalist and fact checkers to oppose the candidates. There total 6 episode, with only 11 out of 18 candidates attending the debates.

==== Debate at Olimpiyskyi Stadium ====
On 31 March, after the announcement of the results of the exit polls of the first round of the presidential elections of Ukraine, Poroshenko invited Zelenskyy to a public open debate. On 3 April Zelenskyy put forward a proposal for an exclusive public debate at the stadium, on which Poroshenko agreed. Poroshenko proposed to hold a debate at the stadium on Sunday, 14 April in order to hold a debate on 19 April on UA:PBC. Zelenskyy refused and Poroshenko held a press conference in front of voters and journalists alone. At 19:00 on 19 April, as previously agreed, the debate between Poroshenko and Zelenskyy began at Olimpiyskyi Stadium.

The debate on 19 April was moderated by Andriy Kulykov, a full time broadcaster for Hromadske Radio, and Olena Frolyak, the longtime presenter of the nightly news program Facts on ICTV. Kulykov had formerly been a presenter of his own show on ICTV, The Freedom of Speech, but had left the station in 2016 to work full time in radio. Frolyak coincidentally celebrated her birthday on 19 April and had to cancel vacation plans the night before when she was selected to moderate the debate. After the broadcast of the debate ended, Zelenskyy walked up to the microphone and said to the crowd: "The broadcast is over. Well? It's her birthday today! Congratulate her!" Zelenskyy then led the entire stadium to sing a Ukrainian version of happy birthday to Olena Frolyak.

==== National debate ====
The same day, 19 April, UA:PBC also held a final official debate commissioned by the Central Electoral Commission in the UA:PBC studio. Zelenskyy refused to attend the debate, leaving Poroshenko alone in the studio.

2019 Ukrainian presidential election debates
Date	Organisers	P Present I Invitee N Non-invitee																																		Refs
Date	Organisers	Ihor Shevchenko Independent	Serhiy Kaplin SDP	Vitaliy Skotsyk Independent	Andriy Sadovyi Samopomich	Valentyn Nalyvaichenko Spravedlyvist	Anatoliy Hrytsenko HP	Vitalii Kuprii Independent	Yevhen Murayev Nashi	Olha Bohomolets Independent	Hennadiy Balashov 5.10	Roman Nasirov Independent	Yuriy Boyko Independent (Note: De jure independent, however on 17 November 2018, Opposition Platform – For Life nominated Boiko for the presidency, but because OPZZh was not yet registered as a party in January 2019 it could not officially nominate him as its candidate.)	Yulia Tymoshenko Batkivshchyna	Oleh Liashko RPOL	Oleksandr Vilkul OBPPD	Oleksandr Moroz SPOM	Arkadiy Kornatskiy Independent	Ruslan Koshulynskyi Svoboda	Oleksandr Danylyuk Independent	Serhii Taruta Osnova	Volodymyr Zelenskyy SN	Inna Bohoslovska Independent	Ihor Smeshko Independent	Yuriy Derevyanko Volia	Roman Bezsmertnyi Independent	Viktor Bondar Vidrodzhennia	Viktor Kryvenko NRU	Serhii Nosenko Independent	Andrii Novak Patriot	Yurii Karmazin Independent	Yulia Lytvynenko Independent	Volodymyr Petrov Independent	Petro Poroshenko Independent	Dmytro Hnap SL	Refs
19 February	ZIK	N	N	N	N	N	N	N	P	N	N	P	N	N	N	N	N	N	N	N	N	N	N	N	N	P	N	P	N	N	N	N	N	N	N	
26 February	ZIK	P	N	N	N	N	N	N	N	N	N	N	N	N	N	N	N	N	N	N	N	N	P	P	N	N	N	N	N	N	N	N	N	N	P	
1 March	Espreso TV	N	N	N	P	N	N	N	N	N	N	N	N	N	N	N	N	N	N	N	I (Note: Initially agreed to take part, but after Sadovyi announced his candidacy withdrawal, decided to not take part in the debate.)	N	N	N	N	N	N	N	N	N	N	N	N	N	N	
5 March	ZIK	N	N	N	N	N	N	P	N	N	P	N	N	N	N	N	N	N	N	N	N	N	N	N	N	N	N	N	N	P	N	P	N	N	N	
8 March	Espreso TV	N	N	N	N	P	N	N	N	N	N	N	N	N	N	N	N	N	N	N	N	N	N	N	P	N	N	N	N	N	N	N	N	N	N	
12 March	ZIK	N	N	N	N	N	N	N	N	P	N	N	N	N	N	N	N	P	N	N	N	N	N	N	P	N	P	N	N	N	N	N	N	N	N	
15 March	Espreso TV	N	N	N	N	N	N	P	N	N	N	N	N	N	N	N	N	N	N	N	N	N	P	N	N	N	N	N	N	N	N	N	N	N	N	
18 March	UA:PBC	N	I (Note: Initially agreed to take part in the debate, but 3 hours prior to the debate he refused to do so.)	N	N	N	N	N	N	N	N	N	N	N	N	N	P	N	N	N	N	N	P	N	N	N	N	N	N	N	N	N	N	N	N	
19 March	ZIK	N	N	P	N	N	N	N	N	N	N	N	N	N	N	N	P	N	N	P	N	N	N	N	N	N	N	N	N	N	P	N	N	N	N	
20 March	UA:PBC	N	N	N	N	P	N	N	N	N	P	N	N	N	N	N	N	N	N	N	N	N	N	N	N	P	N	N	N	N	N	N	N	N	N	
22 March	Espreso TV	N	N	N	N	N	N	N	N	N	P	N	N	N	N	N	N	N	N	P	N	N	N	N	N	P	N	N	N	N	N	N	N	N	N	
22 March	UA:PBC	N	N	N	N	N	N	N	N	P	N	N	N	N	N	N	N	N	P	N	I (Note: Initially invited, however, on 16 March 2019 he withdrew his candidacy in favour of Yulia Tymoshenko, proceeding to not take part in the debate.)	N	N	N	N	N	N	N	N	N	N	N	N	N	N	
25 March	UA:PBC	N	N	N	N	N	N	N	N	N	N	N	N	N	N	I (Note: Was invited, but refused to take part.)	N	P	N	N	N	N	N	P	N	N	N	N	N	N	N	N	N	N	N	
26 March	ZIK	N	I (Note: Initially agreed to take part in the debate, but in the end, he didn't.)	N	N	N	N	N	N	N	N	N	N	N	N	N	N	N	P	N	N	N	N	N	N	N	N	N	P	N	N	N	P	N	N	
27 March	UA:PBC	N	N	N	N	N	P	N	N	N	N	N	I (Note: Was invited, but refused to take part due to the biased editorial policy of the public broadcaster and the fact of censorship.)	N	I (Note: Was invited, but refused to take part due to the fact that UA:Pershyi debates won't be watched by anyone, due to the unpopularity of the channel.)	N	N	N	N	N	N	N	N	N	N	N	N	N	N	N	N	N	N	N	N	
28 March	ZIK	N	P	N	N	N	N	P	N	N	P	N	N	N	N	N	N	N	N	N	N	N	P	N	P	P	N	N	N	N	N	N	N	N	N	
29 March	Espreso TV	P	N	N	N	N	N	N	N	N	N	N	N	N	N	N	N	N	P	N	N	N	N	N	N	N	N	P	N	N	N	N	N	N	N	
29 March	UA:PBC	N	N	N	N	N	N	N	N	N	N	N	N	P (Note: Attended, but left the debate a few minutes later, explaining that she came only to debate Zelensky and Poroshenko, declining to answer the questions of experts in the studio.)	N	N	N	N	N	N	N	I (Note: Was invited, but refused to take part due to meeting with electors. However, journalist Nataliia Sokolenko pointed out that Zelensky had a concert with his Kvartal 95 in Brovary the same day.)	N	N	N	N	N	N	N	N	N	N	N	I (Note: Was invited, but refused to take part without any explanation.)	N	
19 April (Note: Non-official debate organized by UA:PBC on Olimpiyskiy National Sports Complex.)	UA:PBC	N	N	N	N	N	N	N	N	N	N	N	N	N	N	N	N	N	N	N	N	P	N	N	N	N	N	N	N	N	N	N	N	P	N	
19 April (Note: Official debate organized by UA:PBC and commissioned by the TsVK.)	UA:PBC	N	N	N	N	N	N	N	N	N	N	N	N	N	N	N	N	N	N	N	N	I (Note: Was invited, but refused to take part.)	N	N	N	N	N	N	N	N	N	N	N	P	N	

== Endorsements ==
Endorsements from first-round candidates
First-round candidate	First round	Endorsement	Ref.
Yulia Tymoshenko	13.56%	No endorsement	
Yuriy Boyko	11.82%	No endorsement	
Anatoliy Hrytsenko	7.00%	Against Poroshenko	
Ihor Smeshko	6.11%	Against Poroshenko	
Oleh Liashko	5.55%	No endorsement	
Oleksandr Vilkul	4.20%	Against Poroshenko	
Ruslan Koshulynskyi	1.65%	No endorsement	
Yuriy Tymoshenko	0.63%	No endorsement	
Oleksandr Shevchenko	0.58%	Volodymyr Zelenskyy	
Valentyn Nalyvaichenko	0.23%	Against Poroshenko	
Olha Bohomolets	0.18%	No endorsement	
Hennadiy Balashov	0.18%	No endorsement	
Roman Bezsmertnyi	0.15%	No endorsement	
Viktor Bondar	0.12%	Volodymyr Zelenskyy	
Yulia Lytvynenko	0.11%	No endorsement	
Yuriy Derevyanko	0.10%	No endorsement	
Serhiy Taruta	0.10%	Against Poroshenko (Note: However, Taruta also added that he will vote for Zelenskyy, but refused to publicly endorse him.)	
Ihor Shevchenko	0.10%	Volodymyr Zelenskyy	
Inna Bohoslovska	0.10%	Volodymyr Zelenskyy	
Yurii Karmazin	0.09%	No endorsement	
Volodymyr Petrov	0.08%	No endorsement	
Vitaliy Skotsyk	0.08%	Volodymyr Zelenskyy	
Serhiy Kaplin	0.08%	Against both	
Oleksandr Moroz	0.07%	No endorsement	
Viktor Kryvenko	0.05%	Petro Poroshenko (Note: Kryvenko personally did not endorse anyone, instead saying that he awaits for the party congress decision.)	
Vasyl Zhuravlyov	0.05%	No endorsement	
Illia Kyva	0.03%	Against Poroshenko	
Andriy Novak	0.03%	No endorsement	
Oleksandr Vashchenko	0.03%	No endorsement	
Mykola Haber	0.03%	Volodymyr Zelenskyy	
Oleksandr Solovyev	0.03%	No endorsement	
Ruslan Rygovanov	0.03%	No endorsement	
Oleksandr Danylyuk	0.02%	Petro Poroshenko	
Vitalii Kuprii	0.02%	Volodymyr Zelenskyy	
Arkadiy Kornatskiy	0.02%	Volodymyr Zelenskyy	
Serhiy Nosenko	0.02%	No endorsement	
Roman Nasirov	0.01%	No endorsement	

Endorsements from withdrawn candidates
First-round candidate	First round	Endorsement	Ref.
Andrii Sadovyi	Anatoliy Hrytsenko	"For whoever does not steal"	
Serhiy Kryvonos	Petro Poroshenko	Petro Poroshenko	
Dmytro Gnap	Anatoliy Hrytsenko	Against Poroshenko	
Dmytro Dobrodomov	Anatoliy Hrytsenko	Against Poroshenko	
Yevhen Murayev	Oleksandr Vilkul	Against Poroshenko	

== Opinion polls ==
=== First round ===
LOESS curve for the 2019 Ukrainian presidential election, first round.

=== Second round ===
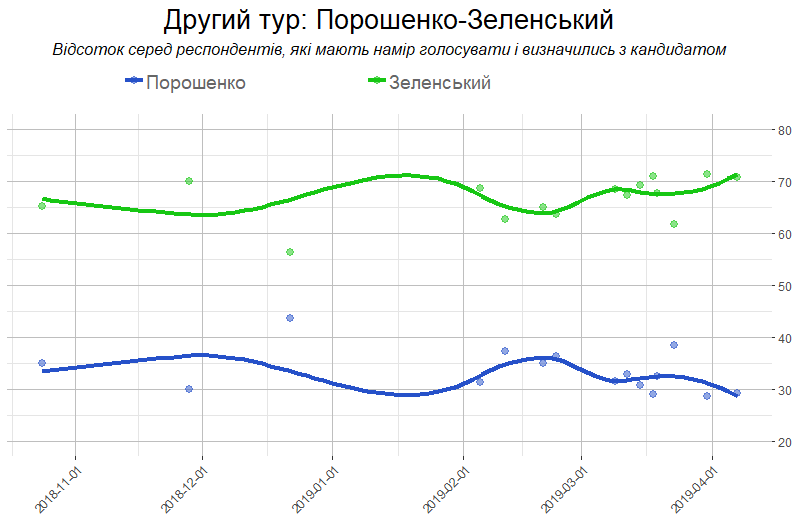
Graph the 2019 Ukrainian presidential election, second round.

== Conduct ==
Although 34,544,993 people were eligible to vote in the elections, the March 2014 annexation of Crimea by Russia and the occupation of parts of Donetsk Oblast and Luhansk Oblast by separatists since April 2014 meant roughly 12% of eligible voters were unable to participate in the elections. The CEC also closed all five foreign polling stations in Ukrainian embassies and consulates within Russia ahead of the vote.

A total of 2,344 international observers from 17 countries and 19 organizations were officially registered to monitor the elections. A record number of 139 non-governmental Ukrainian organizations were registered as observers.

== Results ==
Results of the first round by electoral district: Volodymyr Zelenskyy Petro Poroshenko Yulia Tymoshenko Yuriy Boyko Election was not held due to the War in Donbas or annexation by Russia

Results of the second round by electoral district: Volodymyr Zelenskyy Petro Poroshenko Election was not held due to the War in Donbas or annexation by Russia

About 18.9 million people voted in the first round of elections on 31 March, a turnout of 63%. Volodymyr Zelenskyy of Servant of the People and incumbent president Petro Poroshenko advanced to the second round on 21 April.

Exit polls following the second round predicted that Zelenskyy would win with more than 70% of the vote. With only 3% of the votes counted, the CEC confirmed similar preliminary results. Poroshenko conceded the election in a speech soon after polls closed and exit poll data was released. He wrote on Twitter that "We succeeded to ensure free, fair, democratic and competitive elections... I will accept the will of Ukrainian people."

The below table shows each candidate's share of the valid vote, calculated excluding invalid votes using the results provided by the Central Election Commission:

Candidate	Party	First round		Second round	
Candidate	Party	Votes	%	Votes	%
Volodymyr Zelenskyy	Servant of the People	5,714,034	30.61	13,541,528	74.96
Petro Poroshenko	Independent (BPP)	3,014,609	16.15	4,522,450	25.04
Yulia Tymoshenko	Batkivshchyna	2,532,452	13.56		
Yuriy Boyko	Independent (Opposition Platform — For Life)	2,206,216	11.82		
Anatoliy Hrytsenko	Civil Position	1,306,450	7.00		
Ihor Smeshko	Independent	1,141,332	6.11		
Oleh Liashko	Radical Party of Oleh Liashko	1,036,003	5.55		
Oleksandr Vilkul	Opposition Bloc — Party for Peace and Development	784,274	4.20		
Ruslan Koshulynskyi	Svoboda	307,244	1.65		
Yuriy Tymoshenko	Independent	117,693	0.63		
Oleksandr Shevchenko	UKROP	109,078	0.58		
Valentyn Nalyvaichenko	Spravedlyvist	43,239	0.23		
Olha Bohomolets	Independent	33,966	0.18		
Hennadiy Balashov	5.10	32,872	0.18		
Roman Bezsmertnyi	Independent	27,182	0.15		
Viktor Bondar	Revival	22,564	0.12		
Yulia Lytvynenko	Independent	20,014	0.11		
Yuriy Derevyanko	Liberty	19,542	0.10		
Serhiy Taruta	Osnova	18,918	0.10		
Ihor Shevchenko	Independent	18,667	0.10		
Inna Bohoslovska	Independent	18,482	0.10		
Yurii Karmazin	Independent	15,965	0.09		
Volodymyr Petrov	Independent	15,587	0.08		
Vitaliy Skotsyk	Independent	15,118	0.08		
Serhiy Kaplin	Social Democratic Party	14,532	0.08		
Oleksandr Moroz	Socialist Party of Oleksandr Moroz	13,139	0.07		
Viktor Kryvenko	People's Movement of Ukraine	9,243	0.05		
Vasyl Zhuravlyov	Stability	8,453	0.05		
Illia Kyva	Socialist Party of Ukraine	5,869	0.03		
Andriy Novak	Patriot	5,587	0.03		
Oleksandr Vashchenko	Independent	5,503	0.03		
Mykola Haber	Independent	5,433	0.03		
Oleksandr Solovyev	Reasonable Force	5,331	0.03		
Ruslan Rygovanov	Independent	5,230	0.03		
Oleksandr Danylyuk	Independent	4,648	0.02		
Vitalii Kuprii	Independent	4,508	0.02		
Arkadiy Kornatskiy	Independent	4,494	0.02		
Serhiy Nosenko	Independent	3,114	0.02		
Roman Nasirov	Independent	2,579	0.01		
Total		18,669,164	100.00	18,063,978	100.00
Valid votes		18,669,164	98.81	18,063,978	97.69
Invalid/blank votes		224,600	1.19	427,841	2.31
Total votes		18,893,764	100.00	18,491,819	100.00
Registered voters/turnout		30,047,302	62.88	30,105,004	61.42
Source: Central Election Commission (First round, second round)

=== First round results by region ===
The first round produced no outright winner, but Volodymyr Zelenskyy emerged with a substantial lead, receiving 30.24% of the vote, almost twice the 15.95% received by incumbent president Petro Poroshenko. The remainder of the vote was highly fragmented, with Yulia Tymoshenko and Yuriy Boyko receiving 13.40% and 11.67% respectively, while no other candidate exceeded 7%. Contemporary analysis described Zelenskyy's performance as reflecting both dissatisfaction with the established political elite and an ability to attract support across Ukraine's traditional regional and linguistic divisions.

Regional differences nevertheless remained. Boyko won the Ukrainian-controlled parts of Donetsk and Luhansk oblasts, while Poroshenko placed first in Lviv and Ternopiloblasts as well as among overseas voters. Tymoshenko narrowly won Ivano-Frankivsk Oblast. Zelenskyy won all of the remaining 19 oblasts and the city of Kyiv, recording his strongest result in his home region of Dnipropetrovsk Oblast, where he received over 45% of the vote.

Analysts noted that Zelenskyy's broad geographical support distinguished the election from earlier Ukrainian contests characterised by a stronger east–west electoral divide.

Oblast	Zelensky Servant of the People		Poroshenko Independent (Petro Poroshenko Bloc)		Tymoshenko Batkivshchyna		Boyko Opposition Platform — For Life		Hrytsenko Civil Position		Smeshko Independent (Strength and Honor)		Liashko Radical Party		Vilkul Opposition Bloc		Koshulynskyi Svoboda		Others		Turnout
Oblast	Votes	%	Votes	%	Votes	%	Votes	%	Votes	%	Votes	%	Votes	%	Votes	%	Votes	%	Votes	%	%
Cherkasy	184,984	30.06	75,091	12.20	102,822	16.71	33,881	5.50	57,907	9.41	66,164	10.75	49,802	8.09	9,282	1.50	7,718	1.25	20,645	3.36	63.17
Chernihiv	139,309	26.28	67,701	12.77	103,039	19.43	38,868	7.33	31,256	5.89	44,802	8.45	66,440	12.53	13,138	2.47	4,021	0.75	15,933	3.01	65.37
Chernivtsi	119,821	31.07	54,326	14.09	75,841	19.67	34,674	8.99	19,906	5.16	20,213	5.24	29,075	7.54	4,383	1.13	5,066	1.31	16,240	4.21	56.10
Dnipropetrovsk	746,950	45.34	137,177	8.32	140,442	8.52	203,749	12.36	54,364	3.29	78,789	4.78	46,408	2.81	180,106	10.93	8,214	0.49	30,199	1.83	66.00
Donetsk	209,943	24.74	107,284	12.64	30,705	3.61	312,907	36.87	11,471	1.35	20,987	2.47	22,502	2.65	101,767	11.99	2,666	0.31	16,253	1.92	59.47
Ivano-Frankivsk	104,595	16.07	138,656	21.30	146,510	22.51	6,716	1.03	98,708	15.16	25,166	3.86	26,336	4.04	2,073	0.31	44,651	6.86	57,895	8.89	61.96
Kharkiv	482,470	36.41	112,937	8.52	97,490	7.35	352,196	26.58	41,451	3.12	49,215	3.71	42,367	3.19	99,060	7.47	4,896	0.36	42,765	3.23	64.53
Kherson	176,442	37.58	54,049	11.51	48,526	10.33	73,870	15.73	18,476	3.93	23,693	5.04	28,284	6.02	24,838	5.29	2,565	0.54	18,648	3.97	57.65
Khmelnytskyi	161,958	24.89	108,243	16.63	114,453	17.59	33,005	5.07	55,910	8.59	49,832	7.65	64,041	9.84	7,031	1.08	19,448	2.98	36,681	5.64	65.11
Kyiv (city)	396,247	27.09	374,389	25.59	188,501	12.88	91,725	6.27	133,359	9.11	140,854	9.62	20,725	1.41	32,260	2.20	21,413	1.46	63,217	4.32	68.05
Kyiv Oblast	303,535	30.86	182,594	18.56	165,877	16.86	51,148	5.20	70,995	7.22	86,584	8.80	48,419	4.92	12,984	1.32	16,210	1.64	33,889	3.45	66.50
Kirovohrad	156,606	34.52	53,492	11.79	84,077	18.53	39,680	8.74	19,709	4.34	28,523	6.28	37,062	8.17	9,162	2.02	4,877	1.07	20,356	4.49	61.96
Luhansk	75,863	25.05	19,953	6.58	14,830	4.89	133,126	43.96	4,646	1.53	6,036	1.99	9,610	3.17	27,752	9.16	1,005	0.33	6,238	2.06	56.78
Lviv	158,482	11.96	468,019	35.32	196,817	14.85	17,867	1.34	252,034	19.02	62,059	4.68	45,748	3.45	4,328	0.32	61,745	4.66	43,966	3.32	68.91
Mykolaiv	214,184	40.74	50,946	9.69	46,510	8.84	91,105	17.33	16,636	3.16	21,309	4.05	30,113	5.72	31,240	5.94	2,550	0.48	21,091	4.01	60.20
Odesa	423,720	41.26	93,296	9.08	82,364	8.02	225,140	21.92	29,539	2.87	30,891	3.00	36,025	3.50	62,633	6.09	3,282	0.31	39,978	3.89	58.40
Poltava	262,164	35.62	78,080	10.61	116,725	15.86	69,821	9.48	38,832	5.27	56,398	7.66	55,552	7.54	15,447	2.09	7,835	1.06	27,069	3.68	65.79
Rivne	132,586	24.01	123,256	22.32	88,254	15.98	24,367	4.41	42,543	7.70	31,634	5.73	54,586	9.88	5,370	0.97	15,470	2.80	27,303	4.95	64.97
Sumy	182,039	32.66	59,447	10.66	91,501	16.42	62,408	11.19	30,249	5.42	45,801	8.21	45,470	8.15	12,799	2.29	3,630	0.65	17,914	3.21	64.45
Ternopil	78,783	14.67	130,775	24.36	101,315	18.87	8,353	1.55	91,707	17.08	27,594	5.14	39,820	7.41	2,027	0.37	29,328	5.46	20,858	3.89	66.11
Vinnytsia	187,343	23.42	178,915	22.37	140,882	17.61	38,717	4.84	49,831	6.23	71,869	8.98	65,373	8.17	18,158	2.27	9,033	1.12	30,311	3.79	65.07
Volyn	112,536	21.63	98,747	18.98	103,221	19.84	18,920	3.63	46,915	9.01	36,043	6.92	51,547	9.90	5,730	1.10	14,851	2.85	26,182	5.03	68.40
Zakarpattia	170,023	38.35	50,609	11.41	69,630	15.70	33,182	7.48	22,750	5.13	21,047	4.74	27,806	6.27	8,969	2.02	4,344	0.97	34,969	7.89	47.00
Zaporizhzhia	346,884	39.75	76,510	8.76	71,978	8.24	164,034	18.79	25,966	2.97	40,020	4.58	32,573	3.73	82,101	9.40	3,390	0.38	29,070	3.33	64.37
Zhytomyr	172,249	27.83	98,693	15.94	107,825	17.42	44,604	7.20	35,430	5.72	52,164	8.42	60,133	9.71	10,645	1.72	6,461	1.04	30,631	4.95	64.58
Overseas	14,318	26.01	21,424	38.93	2,317	4.21	2,153	3.91	5,860	10.64	3,645	6.62	186	0.33	991	1.80	2,575	4.67	1,562	2.84	12.62
Ukraine	5,714,034	30.24	3,014,609	15.95	2,532,452	13.40	2,206,216	11.67	1,306,450	6.91	1,141,332	6.04	1,036,003	5.48	784,274	4.15	307,244	1.62	628,279	3.33	62.80
Source: Central Electoral Commission

=== Second round results by region ===
The second round resulted in a landslide victory for Volodymyr Zelenskyy, who received 73.22% of the vote against 24.45% for incumbent president Petro Poroshenko.

Zelenskyy won every oblast except Lviv, while Poroshenko also won among overseas voters. Zelenskyy recorded his strongest result in Luhansk Oblast, with 89.44%, and received more than 85% in Dnipropetrovsk, Donetsk, Odesa, Kharkiv and Zaporizhzhia oblasts. By contrast, Poroshenko retained considerably stronger support in western Ukraine, winning 62.79% in Lviv Oblast and receiving over 40% in Ternopil and Ivano-Frankivsk oblasts.

Although Zelenskyy's support was nationwide, his largest majorities were generally concentrated in the predominantly Russian-speaking east and south. Analysts linked this partly to his more inclusive approach to linguistic and cultural questions and his positioning as an alternative to the established political elite.

Poroshenko's stronger performance in western Ukraine was associated with greater support there for his emphasis on the Ukrainian language, the military, closer Western integration and the establishment of an independent Ukrainian Orthodox Church — themes encapsulated in his campaign slogan “Army, Language, Faith”.

Nevertheless, Zelenskyy's victory across almost the entire country was seen as a significant weakening of the east–west electoral divide that had characterised previous Ukrainian presidential elections.

Oblast	Zelensky Servant of the People		Poroshenko Independent (Petro Poroshenko Bloc)		Turnout
Oblast	Votes	%	Votes	%	%
Cherkasy	459,021	77.43	119,343	20.13	60.94
Chernihiv	394,756	77.80	101,451	19.99	62.61
Chernivtsi	282,223	75.87	80,509	21.64	54.09
Dnipropetrovsk	1,434,652	87.25	177,816	10.81	65.90
Donetsk	710,474	86.94	86,550	10.59	57.23
Ivano-Frankivsk	343,833	54.58	267,488	42.46	59.96
Kharkiv	1,154,617	86.88	148,505	11.17	64.66
Kherson	388,327	83.02	70,431	15.05	57.42
Khmelnytskyi	443,308	70.80	168,025	26.83	62.67
Kyiv (city)	856,310	60.17	525,831	36.95	65.86
Kyiv Oblast	668,245	70.02	264,163	27.68	64.23
Kirovohrad	355,512	80.47	77,370	17.51	60.54
Luhansk	267,710	89.44	25,252	8.43	56.35
Lviv	448,186	34.49	815,966	62.79	67.35
Mykolaiv	452,556	85.52	66,283	12.52	60.66
Odesa	907,033	87.21	110,297	10.60	58.95
Poltava	595,540	82.15	113,243	15.62	64.91
Rivne	309,675	60.06	193,301	37.49	60.70
Sumy	446,812	82.12	86,397	15.87	62.85
Ternopil	262,024	50.43	242,333	46.64	64.06
Vinnytsia	484,827	62.97	267,469	34.74	62.52
Volyn	310,445	63.42	166,266	33.97	64.26
Zakarpattia	353,760	80.67	73,223	16.69	46.39
Zaporizhzhia	754,798	86.55	100,419	11.51	64.26
Zhytomyr	430,688	73.62	141,770	24.23	61.16
Overseas	26,196	43.78	32,749	54.73	13.33
Ukraine	13,541,528	73.22	4,522,450	24.45	61.37
Source: Central Electoral Commission

Italicised oblasts were only partially under Ukrainian government control; elections were held only in government-controlled areas. No voting took place in Crimea or Sevastopol following their annexation by Russia.

== Reactions ==
Poroshenko tweeted that "a new inexperienced Ukrainian president... could be quickly returned to Russia's orbit of influence." Some of Zelenskyy's critics expressed concerns over his close ties with billionaire oligarch Ihor Kolomoyskyi, doubting whether Zelenskyy would be able to stand up against the country's influential oligarchs and the Russian President Vladimir Putin.

Several European Union nations offered their congratulations and hopes of continued partnerships in the future. British Foreign Secretary Jeremy Hunt said that Zelenskyy "will now truly be the Servant of the People." Similar sentiments were expressed by Andrzej Duda, President of Poland, Donald Tusk, the President of the European Council, and NATO Secretary General Jens Stoltenberg. Russia's deputy foreign minister, Grigory Karasin, stated that "The new leadership now must understand and realise the hopes of its electors" in both domestic and foreign policy. Canada's Prime Minister Justin Trudeau congratulated Zelenskyy and thanked the Canadians among the observers overseeing the elections. The President of the United States, Donald Trump, called the president-elect to congratulate him and "the Ukrainian people for a peaceful [and] democratic election."

A joint letter of congratulations was issued by both Tusk and Jean Claude Juncker, the President of the European Commission. The European Union (EU) leaders stated that they hoped Zelenskyy's victory would speed up the implementation of the remaining parts of the EU-Ukraine Association Agreement, including the Deep and Comprehensive Free Trade Area.

== See also ==
- 2019 Ukrainian parliamentary election
- Inauguration of Volodymyr Zelenskyy
