= Maksym Dyrdin =

Ukrainian politician

- Максим Дирдін
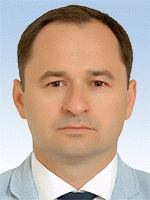
- Official portrait, 2019

People's Deputy of Ukraine
- Incumbent
- Assumed office 29 August 2019
- Preceded by: Arkadiy Kornatskiy
- Constituency: Mykolaiv Oblast, No. 132

Personal details
- Born: 11 October 1982 (age 43) Pervomaisk, Ukrainian SSR, Soviet Union (now Ukraine)
- Party: Servant of the People
- Other political affiliations: Independent
- Education: National University of Taxation

Maksym Yevhenovych Dyrdin (Ukrainian: Максим Євгенович Дирдін; born 11 October 1982) is a Ukrainian politician currently serving as a People's Deputy of Ukraine representing Ukraine's 132nd electoral district, as a member of Servant of the People since 2019.

== Early life and career ==
Maksym Yevhenovych Dyrdin was born on 11 October 1982 in the city of Pervomaisk, in Ukraine's southern Mykolaiv Oblast. He is a graduate of the National University of Taxation, specialising in jurisprudence. Since 2011, he has been a Candidate of Judicial Sciences, and since 2013 he has been an associate professor.

In 2006, Dyrdin became a legal adviser to "Ukraine's Bread" DAK. The same year, he joined the National University of Taxation's staff, working his way up from an assistant to associate professor of criminal law and forensics. He worked at the university until 2016, becoming general director of Santa-Ukrayina, a clothing manufacturer. Since 2009, he has been a lawyer. In the 4th Verkhovna Rada, he served as an assistant to Party of Regions People's Deputy Ivan Kuras.

== Political career ==
In the 2019 Ukrainian parliamentary election, Dyrdin was the candidate of Servant of the People for People's Deputy of Ukraine in Ukraine's 132nd electoral district. At the time of the election, he was an independent. He was successfully elected, defeating the independent incumbent Arkadiy Kornatskiy with 42.54% of the vote to Kornatskiy's 9.95%.

In the Verkhovna Rada (parliament of Ukraine), Dyrdin joined the Servant of the People faction and the Verkhovna Rada Legal Committee. In late 2022, Dyrdin voted for urban planning reform, a move condemned by anti-corruption non-governmental organisation Chesno, as centralising reconstruction efforts following the Russian invasion of Ukraine.
