= Derevyanko =

Derevyanko (Russian: Деревя́нко, Ukrainian: Дерев'я́нко) is a Ukrainian surname that may refer to:

- Kuzma Derevyanko (1904–1954), Lieutenant General of the Soviet Army, Hero of Ukraine
- Leonid Derevyanko, Soviet sprint canoer
- Pavel Derevyanko (born 1976), Russian actor
- Tatiana Derevyanko (1930–2001), Soviet/Ukrainian film scholar
- Yuriy Derevyanko, member of Parliament of Ukraine
- Vladimir Derevyanko, Russian ballet dancer and teacher

== See also ==
- 8984 Derevyanko, asteroid named in honor of Tatiana Derevyanko (1977)
