= Espreso =

Espreso may refer to:

- Espresso
- Espreso TV
