= Vitaliy Skotsyk =

Ukrainian economist (born 1972)

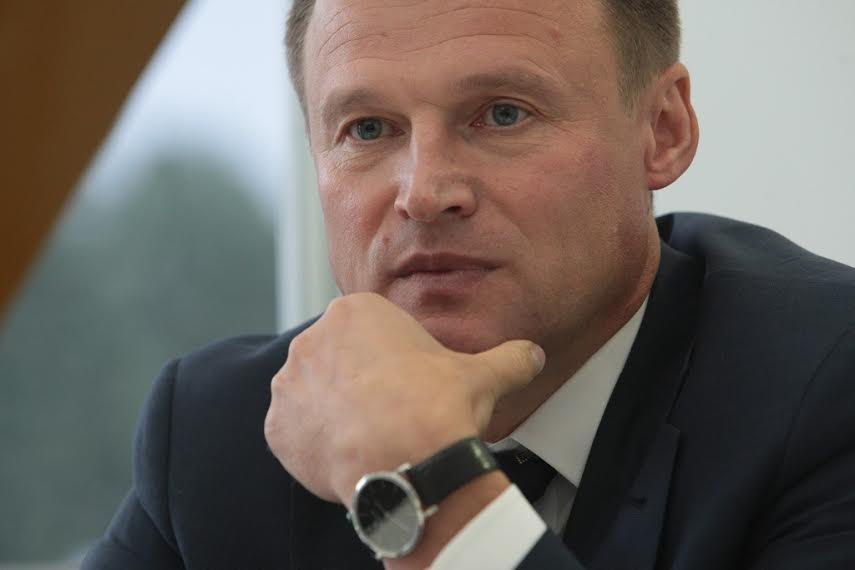

Vitaliy Skotsyk (Ukrainian: Віталій Скоцик; born 15 March 1972 in village Symoniv, Hoshcha Raion, Ukraine) is a Ukrainian economist and ex-Candidate for President of Ukraine. He has received a PhD in agricultural sciences and is a Doctor of Science in economics (strategic management), and Doctor of Science in management of National Economy, emeritus member of the Academy of Agrarian Sciences of Ukraine.

== Education ==
- Since 1989 – studied at the National Agrarian University
- Since 1991 – studied at the Purdue University (USA)
- 1998 – received PhD in agricultural sciences
- 2003 – became Doctor of Science in economics. Vitaliy Skotsyk is the first Dr. Sci. in strategic management in Ukraine
- 2017- became Doctor of Science in management of National economy

== Career ==
- 1994 - 1995 – Lecturer at the National Agrarian University
- 1995 - 1997 – Director of the branch Natures Way Foods (UK)
- Since 1997 – worked on various positions in American Machinery Company (AMAKO)
- Since 2008 – Emeritus Professor of the National Technical University “Kharkiv Polytechnic Institute”
- 2009-2012 - Head of the faculty at National University of biological science and natural resources
- Since 2010 р. – Emeritus member of the National Academy of Agrarian Sciences of Ukraine
- 2012 - December 2014 – Head of the supervisory board of AMAKO Group companies. During this period the company AMAKO was the winner in nominations "Best Network of agrotechnological centers in Ukraine (2008, 2010-1013)", "Best Employer of Ukraine among big enterprises (2009-2010"
- 2009-2012 – CEO, Landkom International. During these years, the company Landkom was recognized as "Best Agricultural Holding of Ukraine" (2010-2011), and "Best Employer among big enterprises" (2011)
- 2009 – Member of the Agrarian Party of Ukraine
- 2010 – Deputy Chairman of the Agrarian Party of Ukraine
- 2014 – Chairman of the Agrarian Party of Ukraine
- 2015 - In first national local elections Party got 7% voters support and became number five through local councils having over 3,500 seats at regional governance
- 2016-2019 Agrarian Party increased presence at regional governance with grown voters support to 14%, Party became number 2–3 in Ukrainian political system
- October 18, 2019 just before start of Ukraine Presidential elections Agrarian Party became a victim of raiders attack and Vitaliy Skotsyk was manipulatively removed from Chairman position
- January 3, 2019 Skotsyk filed documents with the Central Election Commission for registration as a candidate for the 2019 Ukrainian presidential election [https://www.pravda.com.ua/news/2019/01/3/7202928/. The Central Election Commission registered Skotsyk as a candidate on 8 January, he was registered as a self-nominated candidate.
- March 21, 2019 in first round of Presidential elections Vitaliy Skotsyk and newly elected President Volodymyr Zelenskyy, as candidates who never been on government positions, got the highest voters support but to second round Vitaliy Skotsyk did not qualify standing behind former President Petro Poroshenko and newly elected Volodymyr Zelenskyy
- August 2019, elected as Chairman of political party Krayina
- January 2021, co-founded the Institute of Geopolitcs and Strategic Management, elected for position of it`s President
- September 2024, started Strategic Leadership course for students of National University of Life and Environmental Sciences of Ukraine

== Awards ==
- Order of Merit, III degree (Ukraine)
- Winner of the Ukraine National contest "Person of the Year" (2009) in the category "Manager of the Year"
- Numerous certificates and awards for his contribution to the economy of Ukraine and many other countries

== Personal life ==
Skotsyk is married and has three children.

== Sources ==
- The Agrarian party of Ukraine`s web-site
