= Yulia Lytvynenko =

Ukrainian television host and politician

Yulia Lytvynenko (Ukrainian: Юлія Литвиненко, born 7 November 1976 in Inhulets), is a Ukrainian television host and politician from Kryvyi Rih, Dnipropetrovsk Oblast.

== Biography ==
She graduated from the Department of Journalism of Dnipropetrovsk State University. Until 1999 Lytvynenko worked as a stringer for 1+1 and STB as well as the local regional TV network of the Dnipropetrovsk Oblast.

In 1999 to 2000, she was hosting Question of the day program on the UT-1. From 2001 to 2003 - an anchor lady on the news program Facts at ICTV.

Since 2004, leads the TV project Pozaochi (Behind the eyes) first on K1, then on Inter (2008).

In 2009, Lytvynenko became a co-leader of the concert show Place of meeting on Inter. She also competed on the TV-game show BUM for the Dnipropetrovsk Oblast.

In 2008, Lytvynenko also was a co-leader on the political TV-forum Svoboda na Intere, which later was replaced with the Big Politics with Yevgeniy Kiselev.

Litvinenko officially became a presidential candidate in February 2019. In this election, she did not proceed to the second round of the election; in the first round she gained 0.10% of the votes.

She has a daughter Oleksandra.

== See also ==
- Inter (TV channel)
