= Liberty (political party) =

Ukrainian political party

Volia logo.

Liberty (Ukrainian: Воля; Volia) is a Ukrainian political party registered in 2010. In April 2017 it announced about merging with Movement of New Forces. In December 2018, however, it reversed this decision.

== History ==
In August 2009, the party was created under the name "Party of Ukrainian youth" (Ukrainian: Партія української молоді).

In June 2014, Verkhovna Rada MP Yury Derevyanko was a member of the party. Derevyanko was one of the authors of the law on lustration in Ukraine. In June 2014, it appeared that Viktoria Siumar would lead the party; but she joined People's Front soon after.

The party participated in the 2014 elections to the Verkhovna Rada. At the time, the Volia candidates were included in the election list of Self Reliance (one of its members on the party list of People's Front) and the party ran independent in constituencies (with a first-past-the-post electoral system in one round (candidate with the highest vote total wins)). This way the party won 1 parliamentary seat when Derevyanko won single-member districts number 87 (first-past-the-post wins a parliament seat) located in Nadvirna. He won a parliamentary seat by winning this constituency with 69.67% of the votes. Following the election, Derevyanko stated the party would start its own parliamentary group to defend its “principles, values and political promises”; because of this, other elected (into parliament) members left the party on 9 November 2014. However, no such faction was created. But in the parliament, Volia did end its collaboration with Self Reliance due to "unsatisfactory cooperation" and the claim that certain members of Self Reliance had not met the "lustration, moral and ethical criteria." This resulted in a split within the party in late 2014 where all members elected on the ballot of Self Reliance remained in the ranks of this party, while Derevyanko remained the only deputy from Volia in parliament.

In April 2017, the party announced merging with Movement of New Forces. In December 2018, however, it reversed this decision. Derevyanko stated Volia would not merge because Movement of New Forces leader Mikheil Saakashvili was more interested in his native Georgia than in Ukrainian politics. Derevyanko also claimed that 90% of local council members of Movement of New Forces had joined Volia.

The party failed to win both national elections in 2019. Party leader Derevyanko was the party's (unsuccessful with 0.10% in the first round of the election) candidate in the 2019 Ukrainian presidential election. Viola failed to win any parliamentary seats in the 2019 Ukrainian parliamentary election. The party had 4 candidates in constituencies, but none of them won a parliamentary seat (their best performing candidate gained 1.08%).

In the 2020 Ukrainian local elections the party gained 12 deputies (0.02% of all available mandates).

== See also ==
- Category:Liberty (political party) politicians
