= Reasonable Force (Ukraine) =

Reasonable Force Розумна сила
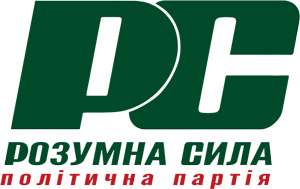
- Leader: Alexander Solovyov
- Founded: 22 January 2016
- Headquarters: Kyiv
- Ideology: Social liberalism
- Political position: Centre
- Colours: White, green

Website
- rozumna-sila.org

Reasonable Force (Ukrainian: Розумна сила; Rozumna Syla) is a Ukrainian political party, founded on 22 January 2016. It is led by Alexander Solovyov. The party consists of 26 regional and more than 600 local (city and district) organizations. The members of the party are more than 20,000 citizens of Ukraine. It is represented in 16 local councils based on the results of the elections, held in December 2016 and April 2017.

The party declares a moderate multi-vector foreign policy of neutrality and non-aligned status. The instruments of coming to a peaceful and prosperous life for every Ukrainian, and, accordingly, the party's priorities are the fight against corruption, the development of SMB through tax exemptions and reforms, tourism, energy, and environmental development.

== History ==
July 2016 – the founding of a political party.

1 October 2016, Kyiv – the founding congress with 250 delegates from all regions of Ukraine is held.

October 2016 – the party signed a memorandum of cooperation with the party "Ukraine Slavett" and fixed the main priority of the party - to preserve the territorial integrity of Ukraine.

31 October 2016, Kyiv – the 2nd Party Congress, making a decision on the participation of the party in local electionsх in the united territorial communities.

14 December 2016 – a memorandum of cooperation with the party "Union. Chernobyl Ukraine".

September 2018 – presentation of a peace initiative to stop the war in Donbas; the People's Declaration on Peace was signed by the civilians in the uncontrolled territory of Donbas. Over 200,000 signatures were collected in support of the People's Declaration on Peace in October. By November the number of signatures reached almost 500,000 people.

== Structure ==
=== Party leaders ===
The chairman of the party is Alexander Solovyov, colonel of the police in the reserve, served in law enforcement agencies for 20 years.

The deputy chairman of the Party is Oleksandr Savchenko, manager, business consultant, economic expert.

The deputy chairman, director of the charitable foundation "Reasonable Force" is Anna Levchuk, lawyer.

=== Party-list ===
Top ten

| № | ПІБ |
| 1 | Alexander Solovyov |
| 2 | Savchenko Alexander |
| 3 | Levchuk Anna |
| 4 | Mamka Gregory |
| 5 | Panadiy Sergiy |
| 6 | Kateryna Samoylyk |
| 7 | Andriy Bodrov |
| 8 | Volodymyr Puzakov |
| 9 | Oleksiy Lyubchenko |
| 10 | Svitlana Stambulyak |

== Program ==
=== Ideology ===
Party declares foreign policy of neutrality: Ukraine should become the center of balance between geopolitical vectors. "Reasonable Force" stands for the principled, consistent and persistent advocacy of national interests of the state.

The values advocated by the party are family, religion, social stability, mutual responsibility of citizens and the state, respect for human rights. The basis of the idea is to strengthen the rule of law, state discipline, and order.

=== Priorities ===
1. Resolution of the war in Donbas
2. Construction of a welfare state
3. Multi-vector non-block foreign policy.
4. Updating the political system.
5. The inevitability of punishment in crimes related to corruption.

== Financial reports ==
In 2017, the party received 1 million 366,000 hryvnias of contributions. 1,264 million received from individuals, mainly from the deputy chairman of the party Oleksandr Savchenko. 102,000 came from Juridical persons.

The expenses of the party in 2017 amounted to 1,363 million UAH, of which 616,000 were spent on room rental, 184,000 - holding party events, 390,000 - the maintenance of regional offices of the party, 130,000 - advocacy.

== Election ==
=== Local elections in the united territorial communities ===
December 2016: two deputies elected in Pavlovsk and two in Litovezh communities, Volyn oblast; two in Bezdrytska, Sumy Oblast, three in Solodar, the Bakhmut district of Donetsk Oblast, three to the Chmyrivska local council, Luhansk region.

May 2017: one deputy elected to the local council of Zabrodovsky united territorial communities in Volyn oblast.

October 2017: three deputies elected to the Lubomlsk city council.

In the 2020 Ukrainian local elections the party gained 5 deputies (0.01% of all available mandates).

== Social activities ==
The party founded the Charity Foundation “Reasonable Force,” which implements projects in the spheres of education and sports among orphans, semi-infants, children from large families and low-income families. It organizes sports championships and tournaments, finances participation of children in competitions. Also, the Foundation provides free legal services to entrepreneurs.

The Party is the initiator of "round tables": "Ukraine's foreign policy status: current and future", "Problems of reforming local police and prosecutor's offices", "Exit strategies from the socio-economic crisis", "Educational reform: innovation or degradation?". The results of the discussions are presented in resolutions, that was sent to the profile ministries.

The party is co-organizer of the Forum of National Minorities of Ukraine, 20 November 2017. The forum was initiated to enable representatives of national minorities to express their views on such issues as the language problem in the context of the Law of Ukraine "On Education," the effective integration of representatives of national minorities into Ukrainian society and their participation in the authorities and local governments. The forum was devastated by the radical nationalists.

The party launched an All-Ukrainian Ecological Action "Plant a Tree" to the 26th anniversary of Ukraine's independence. The results of it was landing of 26,000 trees. The promotion has been announced for an indefinite period, and it continues now.

== Critics ==
In early October 2018, the Verkhovna Rada deputy from the political party "People's Front" Yuri Bereza accused the party of anti-Ukrainian activities. The next day in the media there was information that Yuri Bereza took money from various political parties to recall them from the rostrum of the Verkhovna Rada and that "Reasonable Force" allegedly paid $1500 for mentioning the party's name in the speech.

In 2018, the party was accused of the pro-Kremlin position by nationalists. The party was also blamed in manipulating the public through promises of peace without any military action, supporting Russia's ideas.

The analyst of the Center for Research on Civil Society Maria Kucherenko believes that "Reasonable Force" is not a party, but a political project. She accuses the party of expressing its views against territorial integrity, spreading the idea of a civil war in eastern Ukraine.

== Scandals ==
In May 2018, Boris Herman, a suspect in an attempt to kill a Russian journalist Arkady Babchenko, said at court that he collaborated with the Ukrainian counterintelligence and revealed Russian agents. According to Hermann, the party "Reasonable Force" is funded by Putin's private fund. This allegation became an occasion for the SBU to conduct searches at party offices throughout Ukraine and interrogate their leaders.

On 1 August 2018 the SBU conducted searches at the headquarters of the party, at the head offices` home addresses, as well as in regional headquarters. The Shevchenkivskiy district court of Kyiv recognized the actions of investigators during the search that were beyond the legal framework.

The press service of the party denied the allegation of Russian financing and called it absurd. Two annually NAPC inspections did not reveal any violations. Also, according to the investigation of the Ukrayinska Pravda, direct links to funding from Russia in open sources are not followed.

On 20 November 2017 unidentified people dressed in dark clothes and the camouflage broke the National Minorities Forum organized by the Reasonable Force in Kyiv. Involvement in the attack is attributed to ultra-right activists from the political party Svoboda. According to the organizers, members of the party repeatedly threatened to disrupt the holding of the event. In turn, the Kyiv branch of Svoboda called the Forum of National Minorities "a separatist sabbath."

On 6 July 2018 representatives of the right radical organization "С14" in Kyiv beat the deputy chairman of the party Alexander Savchenko.

On 26 September 2018 right-wing radical forces burst into the office of the party in Pokrovsky and destroyed it. These facts were recorded and transmitted to the PACE report.

== Interesting Facts ==
In September 2018, a party delegation headed by leader Alexander Solovyov held a meeting in the Bundestag with deputies of the German parliament and members of the European Parliament. The party delegation presented the Peace Initiative.

The deputies of the Bundestag expressed their readiness to make statements in the case of such pressure and invited the members of the "Reasonable Force" to present their position in the PACE.
