= Congress of Ukrainian Nationalists =

Congress of Ukrainian Nationalists Конгрес українських націоналістів
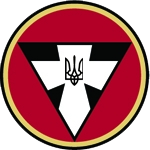
- Leader: Stepan Bratsiun
- Founded: 18 October 1992
- Headquarters: Kyiv
- Paramilitary wing: Tryzub
- Ideology: Ukrainian nationalism Right-wing populism Social conservatism
- Political position: Far-right
- European affiliation: Alliance for Europe of the Nations (until 2009)
- Colours: Red and black
- Verkhovna Rada: 0 / 450
- Regions: 13 / 43,122

Website
- http://www.kun.org.ua

The Congress of Ukrainian Nationalists (Ukrainian: Конгрес українських націоналістів, romanized: Konhres ukrayinskykh natsionalistiv) (KUN) is a far-right political party in Ukraine. It was founded on 18 October 1992 and registered with the Ministry of Justice on 26 January 1993. The party leader from its formation until her death in 2003 was Yaroslava Stetsko (people's deputy of three Verkhovna Rada conventions).

== History ==
The party was set up late 1992 by émigrés of OUN-B on the initiative of Slava Stetsko and Roman Zvarych. It was registered on 26 January 1993 by the Ukrainian Ministry of Justice and was the 11th political party in Ukraine that was officially registered.

During the 1998 parliamentary election, the party was part (together with Ukrainian Conservative Republican Party and Ukrainian Republican Party) of the Election Bloc "National Front" (Ukrainian: Виборчий блок партій «Національний фронт») which won 2.71% of the national votes and 6 (single-mandate constituency) seats.

At the parliamentary elections on 30 March 2002, the party was part of the Viktor Yushchenko Bloc Our Ukraine. Former party leader Oleksiy Ivchenko was the head of Naftogas of Ukraine under the Yekhanurov Government. He was elected as the party leader at the seventh convention of the party on 13 April 2003.

During the parliamentary elections of 2006 on 26 March, the party was part of the Our Ukraine alliance. Roman Zvarych was Minister of Justice of Ukraine in the First Tymoshenko Government and Second Tymoshenko Government and in the Alliance of National Unity.

At the end of 2006, the Prosecutor General of Ukraine’s Office opened a criminal case against party leader Oleksii Ivchenko on charges of embezzlement and abuse of his official position as former head of Naftogaz. Ivchenko was dropped from its party ticket in the spring of 2007. The party refused to join the Our Ukraine–People's Self-Defense Bloc in August 2007 and almost a month before the elections decided not to run in the 2007 parliamentary elections.

In the 2010 local elections, the party biggest achievement was winning two seats in the Lviv Oblast Counsel. In December 2011, Stepan Bratsiun was elected party leader.

The party competed on one single party under "umbrella" party Our Ukraine in the 2012 parliamentary election, together with Ukrainian People's Party; this list won 1.11% of the national votes and no constituencies and thus failed to win parliamentary representation. The party itself had competed in 28 constituencies and lost in all.

In the 2014 parliamentary election, the party was electable on a nationwide list and it participated in 8 constituencies; but its candidates lost in all of them and the party received only 0.05% of the votes nationwide and thus the party won no parliamentary seats.

On 19 November 2018, the Congress of Ukrainian Nationalists and fellow Ukrainian nationalist political organizations Organization of Ukrainian Nationalists, Right Sector and C14 endorsed the Ruslan Koshulynskyi candidacy in the 2019 presidential election. In the election Koshulynskyi received 1.6% of the votes.

In the 2020 local elections, the party gained 13 deputies (0.03% of all available mandates).

== Ideology ==
The party supports the social conservatism, ultranationalism and a strong nation state independent from Russia.

=== Relation with Jews ===
Party members have in the past espoused in what was seen as anti-Semitic views. In 2005 the official organ of the party, newspaper "The Nation and Power", published an article which said: "The titular nation in Ukraine (ethnic Ukrainians) will disappear in 2006.... After the 2006 election, Ukrainians will dance around the Jews." In his speech at the opening of the Holodomor Memorial in November 2007, the Head of the party in Zaporizhia Oblast Tymchina stated: "Our time has come, and the Dnieper will soon be red with the blood of Kikes (slur for Jews) and Moskals (slur for Russians)." The Kommersant newspaper on 26 January 2010 quoted the head of the Kiev city organization Yuri Shepetyuk saying: "There is no anti-Semitism in Ukraine. The Jews themselves organize various provocations, and then talk about the persecution in their address, to get even more funding from abroad". Kommersant notes: "However, he (Yuri Shepetyuk) did not specify what provocations were staged in Ukraine by representatives of the Jewish community."

The party appears to express support for Zionism and Israel (although not the Israeli government for prosecuting John Demjanjuk, who they believe is wrongly accused of Nazi war crimes), and regards Ze'ev Jabotinsky as a hero, as it features articles by Moysey Fishbein as well as a few other articles.

== Leaders ==
- Slava Stetsko (1992–2003)
- Oleksiy Ivchenko (2003–2010)
- Stepan Bratsiun (2010–present)

== Symbols ==
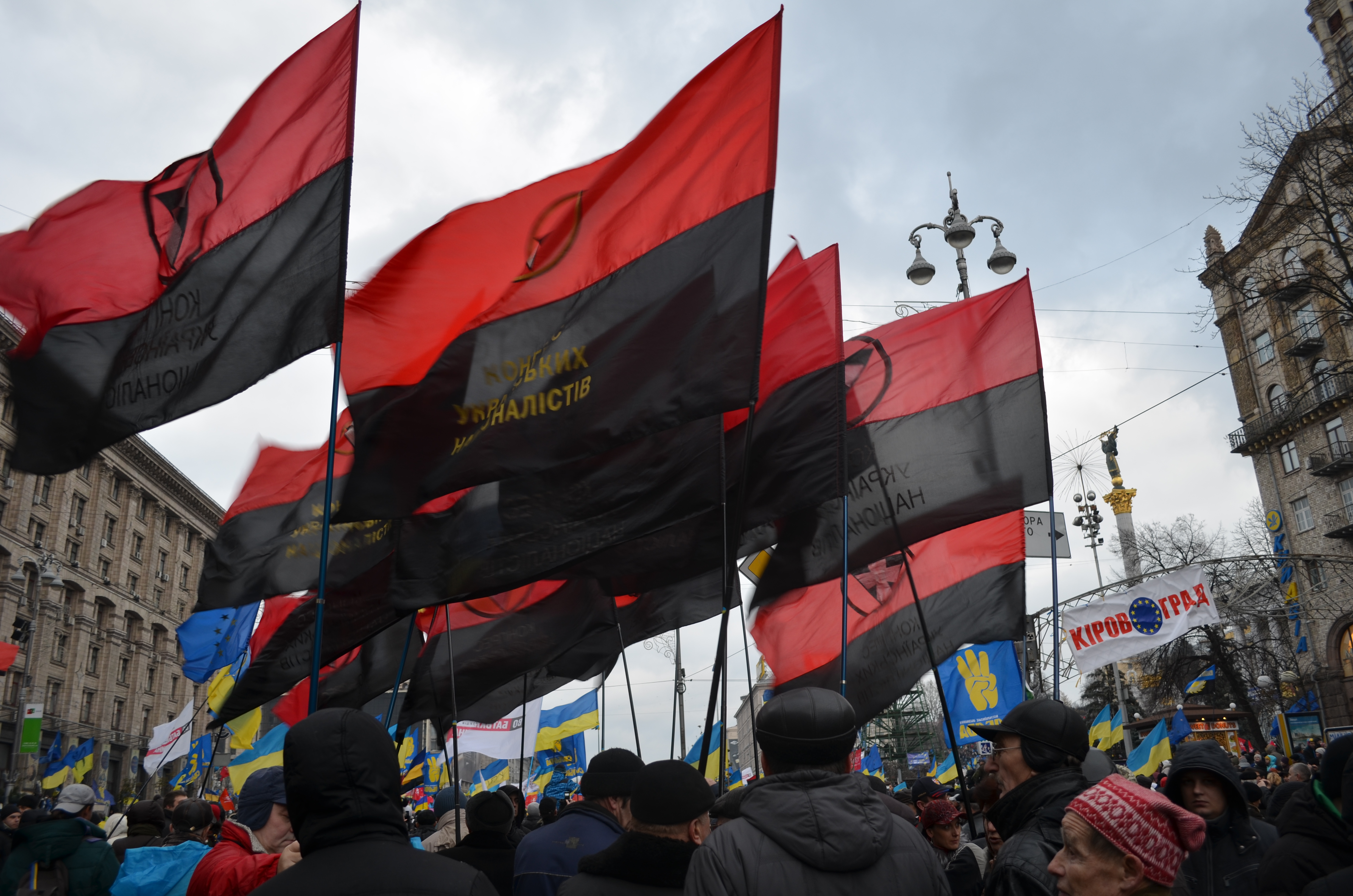
The flag, seen in Kyiv, in December 2013

The flag of the Congress of Ukrainian Nationalists is a rectangular two-color flag with two horizontal halves. The upper half is red and the bottom half is black. It is inspired by the flag of the Ukrainian Insurgent Army. The official emblem is based on that of the former Organization of Ukrainian Nationalists. The red background circle is in-framed by the black (outside) and gold (inside) line with a cross which is placed in the middle and appears to be as a sword. The sword, being aimed blade down, has a dual meaning: the organization in its activities guidance by Christian morality, and the preparedness to protect the Ukrainian nation.

=== Motto ===
The motto of the party is "Glory to Ukraine! To Heroes, (her) Glory!". Other versions include "Glory to free Ukraine! To Heroes (her) Glory!".

== Electoral results ==
Presidential since 1994 (year links to election page)
Year	Candidate	Votes	%
1994			
2019	Ruslan Koshulynskyi	307,240	1.62 #9

Parliamentary since 1994 (year links to election page)
Year	Votes	%	Mandates	Notes
1994	361,352	1.30	5	independently
1998	721,966	2.71	3	as part "National Front", all representatives elected in single-member constituencies
2002	6,108,088	23.57	3	as part of Yushchenko Bloc
2006	3,539,140	13.95	3	as part of Our Ukraine
2007				DNP
2012	226,482	1.11	0	under "umbrella" party Our Ukraine
2014	8,976	0.05	0	independently
2019	315,530	2.15	0	under "umbrella" party Svoboda

Local councils
Election	Performance				Rank
Election	%	± pp	Seats	+/–	Rank
2015	0.06%	New	99 / 158,399	New	32nd
2020	0.03%	▼0.03	13 / 43,122	▼86	68th
