= Ruslan Koshulynskyi =

Ukrainian politician (born 1969)

- Руслан Кошулинський
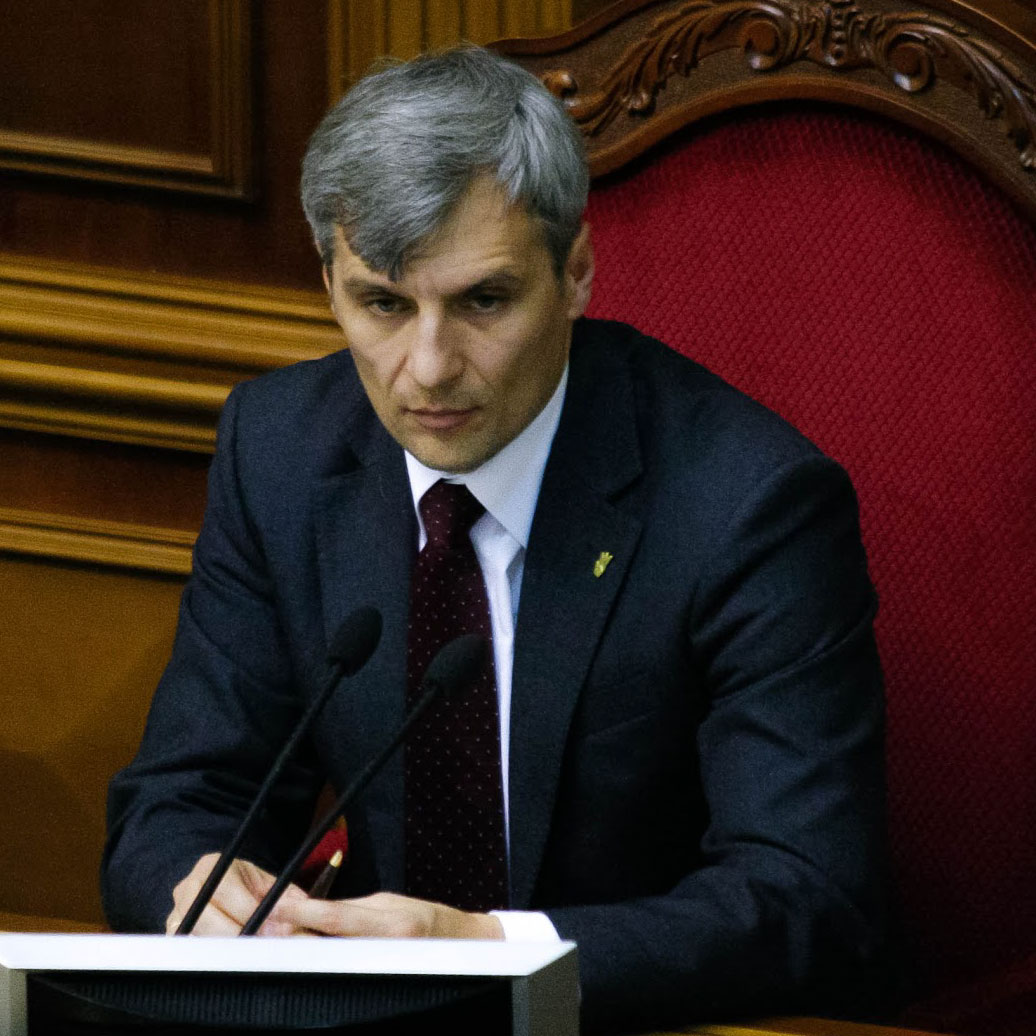
- Koshulynskyi in 2014

Deputy Chairman of the Verkhovna Rada
- In office 13 December 2012 – 27 November 2014
- Preceded by: Mykola Tomenko
- Succeeded by: Oksana Syroyid

People's Deputy of Ukraine

7th convocation
- In office 12 December 2012 – 27 November 2014

Personal details
- Born: Ruslan Volodymyrovych Koshulynskyi; 9 September 1969 (age 57) Lviv, Ukrainian SSR, Soviet Union (now Ukraine)
- Party: Svoboda
- Education: West Ukrainian National University

Ruslan Volodymyrovych Koshulynskyi (Ukrainian: Руслан Володимирович Кошулинський; born 9 September 1969) is a Ukrainian politician, nationalist, soldier, and former People's Deputy of Ukraine who served as the 9th Deputy Speaker of the Verkhovna Rada (2012–2014). He is also the Deputy Leader of Svoboda party.

== Early life and education ==
Koshulynskyi was born in Lviv to Victor Kosulynskyi and Natalia Koshulynska (née Etkind). He attended the Lviv Sports Boarding School, graduating in 1986. In 1987, he was conscripted to the Soviet Army and served in East Germany for two years. After the army service, he enrolled to the Lviv Cooperative College of Economics and Law, which he completed in 1991. He then moved to the Kolomyia region, where he found work as production manager in a local restaurant. In 1995, he travelled to Krasnoyarsk Krai to work at a gold mining company for a year. Upon his return to Lviv in 1996, he became involved in politics and joined the Svoboda party. In the early 2000s, he took up post-secondary studies again at the Ternopil National Economic University and graduated with a bachelor's degree in law in 2006.

== Political life ==
In August 2008, Koshulynsky was appointed the deputy head of the Svoboda an ultranationalist political party in Ukraine. In November 2010 he became the leader of the Svoboda party caucus at the Lviv City Council, as well as the member of the Council's standing committee on finance and budgetary planning.

He was Svoboda's campaign manager during its national breakthrough at the 2012 Ukrainian parliamentary election. The Parliament elected him the Deputy Speaker by absolute majority of the vote. During his time in office he co-chaired the Poland-Ukraine interparliamentary group. Koshulynsky actively supported the 2013-2014 demonstrations against the regime of president Viktor Yanukovych and was one of a handful of parliamentary opposition members who remained with the protesters during the police gunfire in February 2014. In March 2014 he stated that the decision to hold Crimea referendum was unconstitutional, citing the absence of Ukrainian legislative framework on local referendums.

In Ukraine's 2014 snap parliamentary election Koshulynskyi ran 2nd on the party list, but the party ended up 0.29% short of the minimum required 5% national vote.

On 25 October 2015 he unsuccessfully ran for Lviv city mayor, losing in the second round to the incumbent Andriy Sadovyi with 36.8% of the vote.

He was elected as member of the Lviv Oblast Council in the 2015 election.

He believes that Ukraine's government can finance the armed forces by levying increased war tax on the oligarchs.

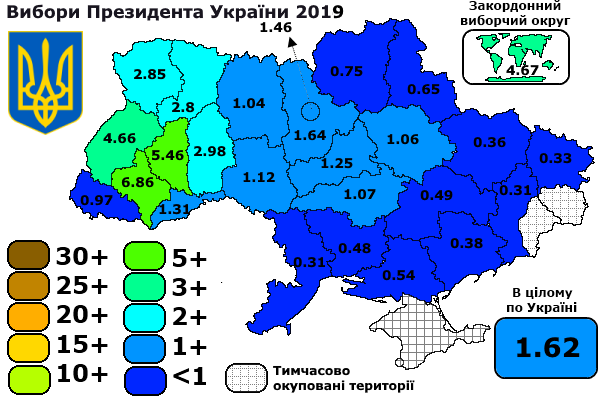
Results for Koshulynskyi in percentages at the first round of the 2019 Ukrainian presidential election

On 19 November 2018 Svoboda and fellow Ukrainian nationalist political organizations Organization of Ukrainian Nationalists, Congress of Ukrainian Nationalists, Right Sector and C14 endorsed Koshulynskyi candidacy in the 2019 Ukrainian presidential election. In the election he received 1.6% of the votes.

In the 2019 Ukrainian parliamentary election Koshulynskyi was placed fifth on the joined list of Svoboda with National Corps, the Governmental Initiative of Yarosh and Right Sector. But in the election they won 2.15% of the votes, less than half if the 5% election threshold, and thus no parliamentary seats via the national party list.

In the 28 March 2021 by-election for constituency 87 (located in Ivano-Frankivsk Oblast) Koshulynskyi was a candidate for Svoboda. On 16 March European Solidarity candidate Marusya Zvirobiy withdrew her candidacy in favor of Koshulynskyi. On 22 April 2021 the Central Election Commission of Ukraine (CEC) officially declared Servant of the People candidate Vasyl Virastyuk the winner of this election with 31.25%. Olexandr Shevchenko officially received 749 votes less (gaining 29.69% of vote) and Koshulynskyi came third with 28.86% of the vote. Shevchenko appealed this decision and on 2 May 2021 the Supreme Court of Ukraine revoked the April 22 CEC decision claiming the CEC had not ensured the verification of all violations committed during the election. On 19 May 2021 the CEC drew up a new protocol on the results of the election; This time they declared the results of 6 polling stations invalid. According to this document Virastyuk had gained 14,811 votes, Shevchenko 13,942 and Koshulynskyi 13,463. On 23 May 2021 the Supreme Court annulled this protocol too after an appeal by Shevchenko. The Grand Chamber of the Supreme Court annulled this decision on 5 June 2021 and ten days later Virastyuk took the oath of People's Deputy of Ukraine.

== Donbas War assignment ==
During Ukraine's 2015 mobilization effort Koshulynskyi joined the artillery troops of the Ukrainian Ground Forces as Gun Commander. After undergoing training at the International Peacekeeping and Security Centre in Yavoriv, he was deployed to the war zone in the Luhansk region of east Ukraine. Koshulynskyi served as Senior Sergeant during his combat duty.

== Personal life ==
Koshulynskyi is married to Mariia Koshulynska, with whom he has three children.
