= Serhiy Kaplin =

Ukrainian politician

- Сергій Каплін
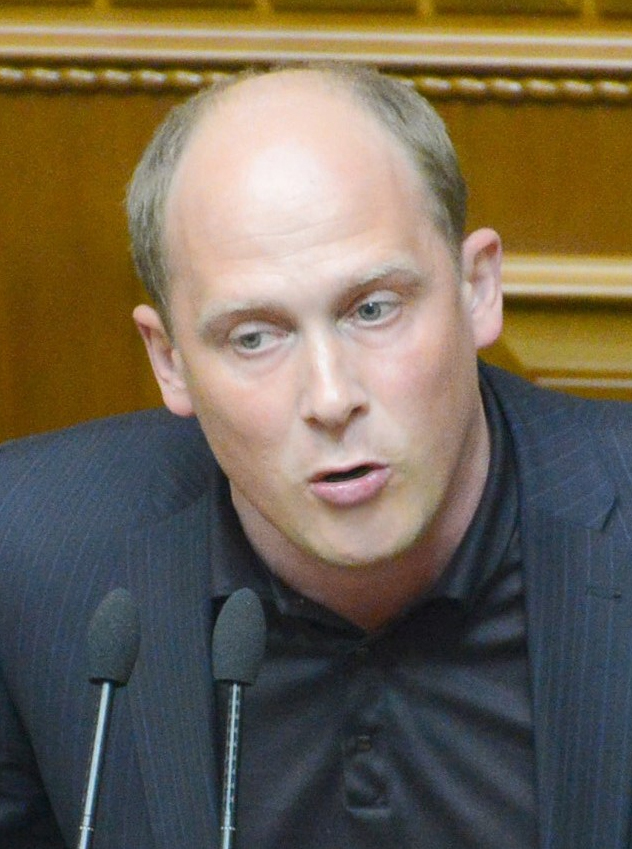

People's Deputy of Ukraine

7th convocation
- In office December 12, 2012 – November 27, 2014
- Constituency: UDAR, No. 144 electoral district

8th convocation
- In office November 27, 2014 – 29 August 2019
- Constituency: Petro Poroshenko Bloc, No. 144 electoral district

Personal details
- Born: 15 December 1979 (age 46) Opryshky, Hlobyne Raion, Poltava Oblast, Ukrainian SSR, Soviet Union
- Party: UDAR; Petro Poroshenko Bloc; Socialist Party of Ukraine; Social Democratic Party
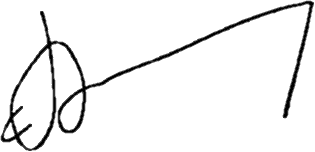
- Signature

Serhiy Mykolayovych Kaplin (Ukrainian: Сергій Миколайович Каплін), born on December 15, 1979, is a Ukrainian politician. He is a People's Deputy of Ukraine of the VIIth (candidate from UDAR) and VIIIth (candidate from Petro Poroshenko Bloc) convocations, and the leader of the Social Democratic Party. In the Ukrainian Parliament, he was a member of the faction of the Petro Poroshenko Bloc.

Kaplin was an unsuccessful candidate for President of Ukraine in the 2019 election.

== Biography ==
On October 2, 2017, Kaplin was elected party leader of the Socialist Party of Ukraine during a congress and he simultaneously stated his intention to take part of the 2019 presidential election. On January 27, 2018, during the "joint meeting of the political council and the central control commission of the Socialist Party of Ukraine" Illia Kyva was expelled from the ranks of the Socialist Party of Ukraine and deprived of the status of the head of this political force. Kyva claimed that his exclusion from the SPU was illegitimate. Meanwhile, according to the legal registration of the Socialist Party Kyva was the legal chairman of this party. Kyva was nominated by the Socialist Party on November 3, 2018, for President of Ukraine in the 2019 election.

According to a 2018 survey (of all Ukrainian politicians) by the "Committee of Voters of Ukraine" most of Kaplin's election promises cannot be fulfilled even theoretically.

In the 2019 Ukrainian parliamentary election Kaplin lost reelection as an independent candidate in single-seat constituency 144 (Poltava Oblast).
