= Inna Bohoslovska =

Ukrainian politician

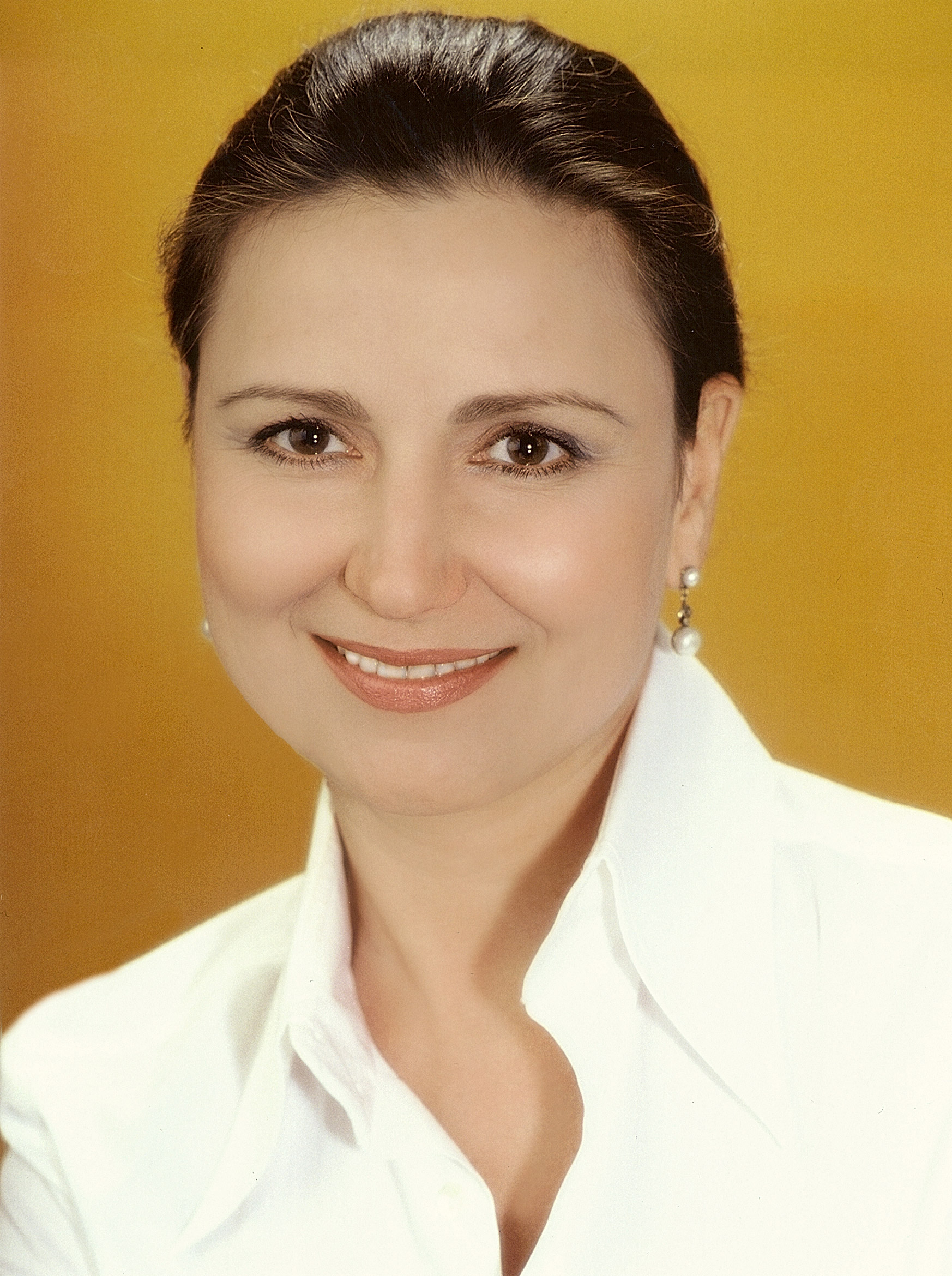
Bohoslovska in the 2010s

Inna Hermanivna Bohoslovska (Ukrainian: Інна Германівна Богословська; born 5 August 1960) is a Ukrainian former politician who served as People's Deputy of Ukraine from 2007 to 2014. Bohoslovska was a candidate for President of Ukraine in the 2010 and 2019 Ukrainian presidential elections, with marginal results.

== Biography ==
Bohoslovska was born in Kharkiv on 5 August 1960. She is married and lives with her daughter and grandson. Her father was a member of the Soviet military and worked as a teacher at a local high school; her mother was a lawyer.

In 1982, Inna Bohoslovska graduated with distinction from the Kharkiv Legal Institute (nowadays called the Yaroslav Mudry National Academy of Law). In the same year, Inna began practical work as a lawyer as a member of the Bar of the Kharkiv Region. Working as a defender, Inna presided on numerous civil and criminal defence cases.

In 1989, Inna Bohoslovska undertook correspondence postgraduate study at the Institution of the State and Rights at the Academy of Sciences of the USSR.

In 1990, she participated in a Soviet-American conference on the protection of human rights.

Following the conference, Inna was invited to study in the United States. However, her position concerning the influence of the state on the judicial system mismatched the then pro-Soviet ideology of the management of the institute, and she had to reject the invitation at the time.

In 1992, Inna Bohoslovska was appointed to the legal board of (Ukraine's national parliament) the Verkhovna Rada - an advisory body to the President of Ukraine. Issues addressed included discussing and analysing various bills, an expert estimation of various legislative initiatives.

Inna Bohoslovska won a majority of litigations. She was one of the youngest members appointed to the structure of the Verkhovna Rada.

In 1998, Bohoslovska decided to become actively involved in politics in Ukraine. During pre-election campaign for the Verkhovna Rada Bohoslovska stood for election as a representative of the local constituency in a Kharkiv in the district in which she was born, went to school, and now lives with her family and daughter.

Inna Bohoslovska, facing stiff competition from 14 other male candidates, managed to secure 34% of the vote—twice the support given to her nearest competitors, which included the leader of the city organization of the Communist Party, one of the leaders of the Socialist Party and the leader of the Social-Liberal Association.

The policies advocated by Bohoslovska were based on the need for the state to carrying out much-needed tax, budgetary, and administrative reforms.

Having worked in the extensively in formation, development and preparation of government policy and legislation, Inna Bohoslovska was asked to become one of the founding members of the Party Viche and was subsequently elected as the first Chairman of the party in 2003. On 3 August 2007, Bohoslovska and other leaders of the party decided to participate in the 2007 parliamentary elections within Party of Regions party list. Ihor Didkovsky was elected as a new party leader. The party considered a merge into Party of Regions in 2007 and did not participate in the 2007 election (however a merger with the Party of Regions did not take place).

In May 2009, Bohoslovska quit the Party of Regions and participated in the presidential election of the next year. Bohoslovska was excluded from the structure of the Party of Regions faction by decision of the political council of the Party of Regions in June 2009. Soon after, Bohoslovska became the leader of Viche again. Bohoslovska’s 2010 campaign centred mostly on criticizing then Prime Minister Yulia Tymoshenko. During the 2010 election she received 0,41% of the votes. Bohoslovska rejoined the Party of Regions faction in October 2010. In 2012, she was re-elected into parliament on the party list of Party of Regions.

From 9 to 10 April 2012, Bohoslovska visited Brussels, Belgium with an official visit to the European Parliament as a representative of the temporary investigation commission of the Ukrainian parliament. Departing on her initiated after filing an authorization petition to the speaker of parliament Volodymyr Lytvyn, she never received a positive reply.

Following a violent crackdown of Euromaidan protesters on 30 November 2013 in Kyiv, Bohoslovska left then President Viktor Yanukovych's Party of Regions in protest, calling for the Yanukovych's resignation.

Bohoslovska did not participate in the 2014 Ukrainian parliamentary election.

In 2019, she registered as a presidential candidate in the 2019 Ukrainian presidential election, which were won by the head of the Kvartal 95 studio, Volodymyr Zelenskyy. In the election Bohoslovska gained 0.09% of the vote. After her defeat in the elections, Bohoslovska left politics.

== Private life ==
She was married three times.

After the 2019 Ukrainian presidential election and on the eve of her 60th birthday, which she celebrated on August 5, 2020, she ended up in a clinic because of her intention to commit suicide.

== See also ==
- 2007 Ukrainian parliamentary election
- List of Ukrainian Parliament Members 2007
- Viche
