= Movement of New Forces =

Movement of New Forces Рух нових сил
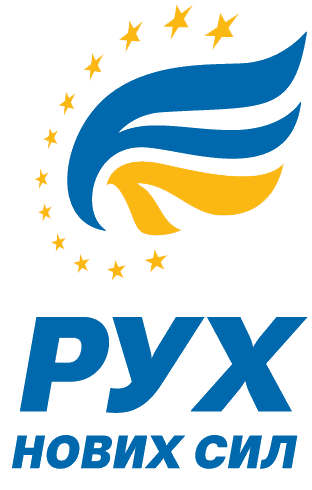
- Chairman: Mikheil Saakashvili
- Founder: Mikheil Saakashvili
- Founded: 23 February 2017
- Headquarters: Muzeinyi Ln, 4; 01001 Kyiv
- Membership (February 2018): 3,000
- Ideology: Liberalism; Pro-Europeanism; Anti-corruption
- Political position: Centre
- Colours: Blue; White
- Verkhovna Rada: 0 / 450
- Regions: 1 / 158,399

Movement of New Forces (Ukrainian: Рух нових сил, romanized: Rukh novykh syl) is a Ukrainian political party which was founded as the Party of Harmonious Development on 11 February 2015, and renamed on 23 February 2017 by former Georgian President and former Ukrainian Governor of Odesa Oblast Mikheil Saakashvili. (Note: In May 2017 a Ukrainian political party "Mikheil Saakashvili Bloc" was also officially registered; but Saakashvili has no involvement with this party. "Mikheil Saakashvili Bloc" was founded by Dmytro Holubov whom was at the time a member of the Ukrainian parliament for Petro Poroshenko Bloc.)

== History ==
After autumn 2015 attempts and negotiations were launched to form a political party around then Governor of Odesa Oblast Mikheil Saakashvili and members of the parliamentary group Interfactional Union "Eurooptimists", Democratic Alliance and possibly Self Reliance. This project collapsed in June 2016. (Note: In an April 2016 opinion poll held by Sociological group "RATING", about 10% of those polled were ready to support a party built around Saakashvili.)

On 11 November 2016, Saakashvili announced the establishment of a new Ukrainian political party. This was done four days after he resigned as Governor of Odesa Oblast, blaming President Petro Poroshenko personally for enabling corruption in Odesa and in Ukraine overall. (Note: On 13 February 2015, Saakashvili was appointed by President Petro Poroshenko as head of the International Advisory Council on Reforms – an advisory body whose main task is working out proposals and recommendations for implementation and introduction of reforms in Ukraine based on best international practices. On 30 May 2015 Poroshenko had appointed Saakashvili Governor of Odesa Oblast (region). On the previous day, 29 May 2015, he was granted Ukrainian citizenship by Poroshenko.) On 27 November 2016 this party (now named Movement of New Forces) held its first rally in Kyiv. In August of that same year Saakashvili was allegedly in talks to create another liberal party with ex-deputy general prosecutors Vitaly Kasko, David Sakvarelidze, MP Viktor Chumak, and others. In July 2016, Chumak stated that a future party called Wave would be led by Saakashvili.

In late February 2017, the Ministry of Justice of Ukraine registered Movement of New Forces officially as a political party. On 24 December 2016, Saakashvili claimed that the new party had "already registered 25,000 members." (Note: In a November–December 2016 opinion poll held by SOCIS and Sociological group "RATING" 4.1% of people polled stated that they would vote for the Movement of New Forces in a hypothetical early election although the party had not yet been officially registered.)

In April 2017, the party Volia and Movement of New Forces announced they would merge. At the same time, according to Saakashvili, nine Ukrainian mayors joined this new association.

In July 2017, the Movement of New Forces and the political movement Spravedlivost of Valentyn Nalyvaichenko created a "joint action headquarters".

On 26 July 2017, President Poroshenko issued a decree stripping party leader Saakashvili of his Ukrainian citizenship. In Ukraine only Ukrainian citizens can lead political parties or be elected to its parliament. David Sakvarelidze became the acting party leader.

In October 2017, the Committee of Voters of Ukraine prepared an appeal to the National Agency for the Prevention of Corruption with a request to check the activities of 21 parties including the Movement of New Forces and Our Ukraine because of the presence of signs of shadow financing. The reason for initiating the verification of the Movement of New Forces was the lack of reporting on the Agency's website for the second quarter of 2017.

On 5 December 2017, Prosecutor General Yuriy Lutsenko stated that Saakashvili had received half a million dollars from Ukrainian oligarch Serhiy Kurchenko for organizing protests. It was stated that Kurchenko provided funds to seize Saakashvili's power in Ukraine and expected that in return criminal cases would be closed and control over his assets restored. Records of Saakashvili allegedly talking to Sergei Kurchenko have been released. Saakashvili denied the allegations. Three criminal proceedings were registered on the facts of the protests of December 17.

After Saakashvili (after being first deported to Poland) relocated to the Netherlands in February 2018 he only has an advisory role in the party. (Note: In a May 2018 opinion poll held by Razumkov Centre and Democratic Initiatives Fund 0.6% of people polled stated that they would vote for the Movement of New Forces in a hypothetical early election.)

In December 2018 the party Volia reversed its decision to merge with the party. Volia party leader (and member of the Ukrainian parliament) Yury Derevyanko stated Volia would not merge because Movement of New Forces leader Saakashvili was more interested in his native Georgia than in Ukrainian politics. Derevyanko also claimed that 90% of local council members of Movement of New Forces had joined Volia.

On 29 May 2019 Saakashvili returned to Ukraine after President Volodymyr Zelenskyy returned his Ukrainian citizenship, but Saakashvili soon stated that he had no political ambitions in Ukraine.

The party in June 2019 stated it intended to run in the late July 2019 Ukrainian parliamentary election. On 23 June 2019 the Central Election Commission of Ukraine refused party members to register for the July parliamentary election because allegedly the 10 June party congress had violated the party’s statute. Two days later the Administrative Court of Kyiv overturned this Central Election Commission decision. On 19 July 2019, the leader of the Movement of New Forces party Mikheil Saakashvili called on his supporters to vote for the Servant of the People party at the 2019 parliamentary election. At these elections, Saakashvili himself was first on its party list, Movement of New Forces failed to win any parliamentary seats gaining 0.46% of the total votes while the election had a 5% election threshold (43.16% voted for Servant of the People). The party also failed to win a constituency seat. It had participated in 9 constituencies where its most successful candidate's election result was 2.54%, the second best candidate gained 1.8%. Volia also did not win any parliamentary seats in the election.

In the 2020 Ukrainian local elections 1 person won a local seat on behalf of the party.

== Management ==
The party's Political Council includes Mikheil Saakashvili, Yuri Derevyanko, David Sakvarelidze and Olga Galabala.

== Political positions ==
In April 2017 party leader Saakashvili proposed "building of a large wall" to "temporarily isolate ourselves" from the separatist Donetsk People's Republic and Luhansk People's Republic in order to "concentrate on the rest of Ukraine." Saakashvili is confident in the return under control of the Ukrainian Government of these separatist territories, but only "after we defeat corruption and begin rapid development."

Early June 2019 party leaders Sakvarelidze and Saakashvili stated that the party wanted "to support the new wave brought by the team of (recently elected) Ukrainian president Volodymyr Zelenskyy".
