= David Sakvarelidze =

Ukrainian and Georgian politician

David Georgievich Sakvarelidze (Georgian: დავით საყვარელიძე; Ukrainian: Давід Георгійович Сакварелідзе; born 15 September 1981, Tbilisi) is a Ukrainian and former Georgian politician, prosecutor, and attorney.

== Biography ==
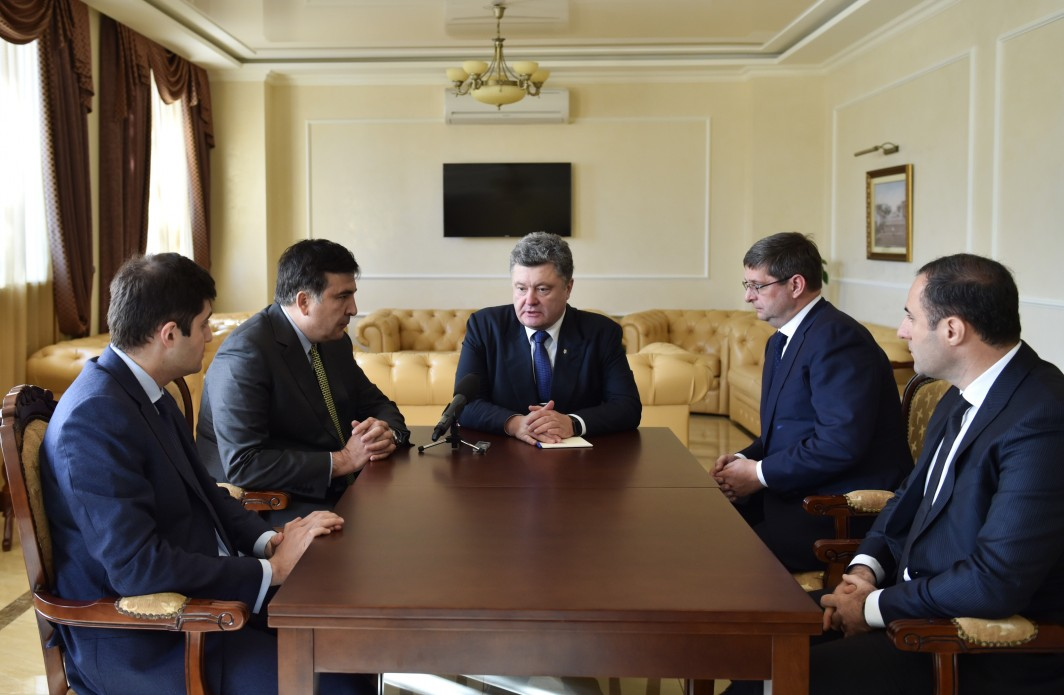
Sakvarelidze (far left) meeting with Ukrainian president Petro Poroshenko

He was Deputy Chief Prosecutor of Georgia from 2008 to 2012. He pursued a zero-tolerance policy for crime. In early June 2011, Sakvarelidze said he has requested the Tbilisi City Court issue an arrest warrant for Badri Bitsadze, who was accused of organizing attacks on policemen during anti-governmental protests in May 2011 and did not pay 100,000 Laris for bail.

Sakvarelidze was an MP in the Parliament of Georgia, representing the opposition United National Movement party, between 2012 and 2015. On 16 February 2015, Sakvarelidze was appointed as Deputy General Prosecutor of Ukraine. Sakvarelidze was also granted Ukrainian citizenship. In office he accused colleagues of taking bribes to protect the freezing of assets of allegedly gained from corruption. In March 2016, he was fired from the General Prosecutor office charged with a “gross violation of the rules of prosecutorial ethics”.

Sakvarelidze is a key ally of Mikheil Saakashvili. Sakvarelidze created a new political party in autumn 2016 that claims Saakashvili as its “ideologist.” At the end of 2016, he joined Saakashvili's Movement of New Forces party.

== Controversy ==
On 27 February 2022, during an interview with the BBC, Sakvarelidze faced backlash on social media for his comments in regards to the 2022 Russian invasion of Ukraine. Sakvarelidze stated that the war situation unfolding in Ukraine was "very emotional" for him because "European people with blue eyes and blonde hair" were being killed every day.
