= Viktor Kryvenko =

Ukrainian politician

- Віктор Кривенко
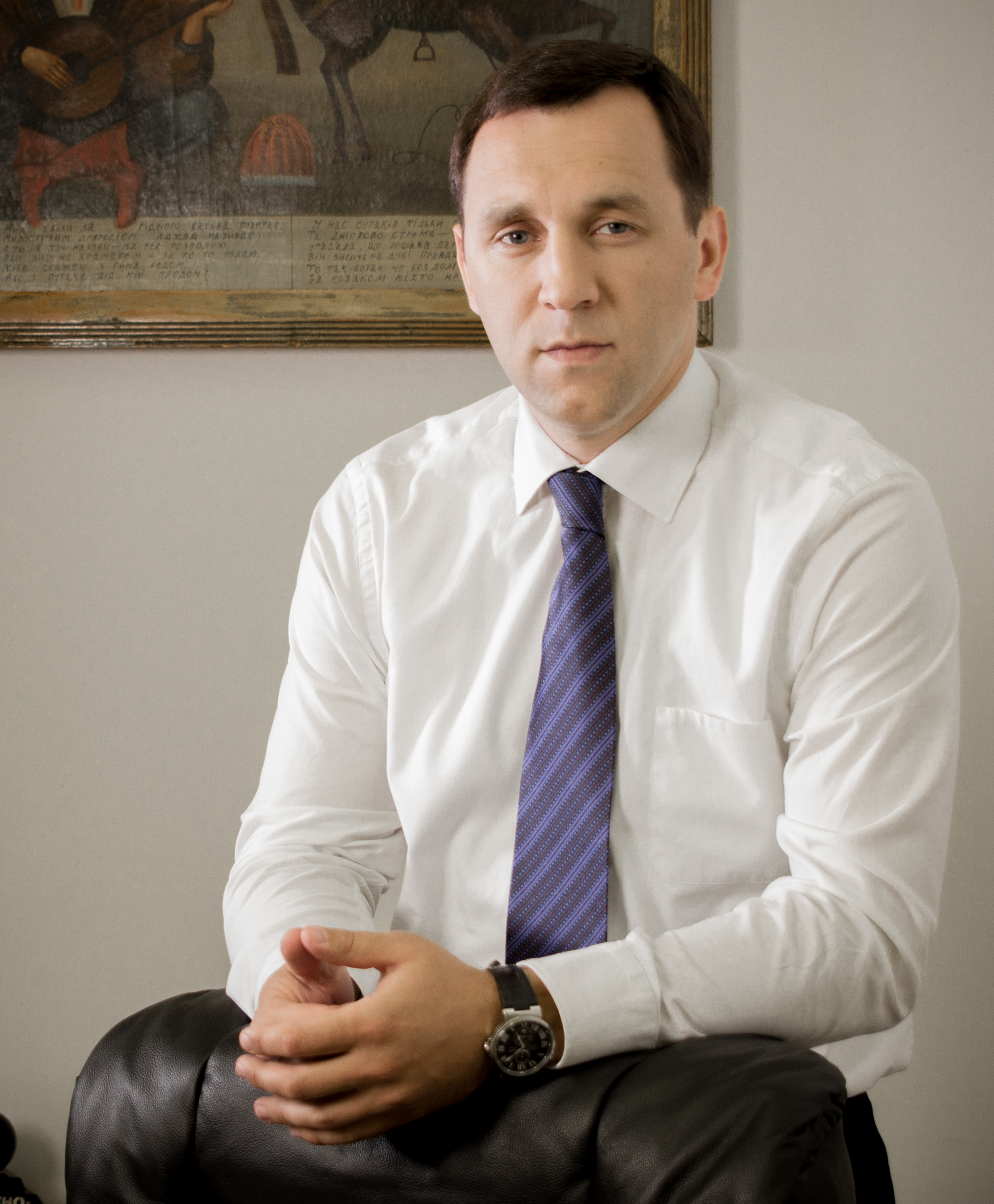
- Kryvenko in May 2014

People's Deputy of Ukraine
- In office 27 November 2014 – 29 August 2019
- Constituency: Self Reliance, No. 5

Personal details
- Born: 9 January 1982 (age 44) Dniprodzerzhynsk, Ukrainian SSR, Soviet Union (now Ukraine)
- Party: People's Movement of Ukraine
- Other political affiliations: Self Reliance (expelled on 31 August 2015)
- Education: Oles Honchar Dnipropetrovsk National University, National University “Yaroslav the Wise Law Academy of Ukraine”, National Academy of State Administration

Viktor Mykolayovych Kryvenko (Ukrainian: Ві́ктор Микола́йович Криве́нко, born 9 January 1982) is a Ukrainian politician.

== Biography ==
In 2009–10, he was the deputy director general at the State Space Agency of Ukraine. In 2014, Kryvenko became the head of the Technopolis and Industrial Parks National Projects. Appearing fifth on the party list of Self Reliance, he was elected to the Verkhovna Rada in the 2014 Ukrainian parliamentary election. Kryvenko was expelled from Self Reliance on 31 August 2015 for his support of amendments to the Ukrainian Constitution that would lead to decentralization.

On 31 March 2016, he joined the Petro Poroshenko Bloc parliamentary faction. Kryvenko also joined (the political party) People's Movement of Ukraine in April 2016. On 21 December 2017 Kryvenko left the Petro Poroshenko Bloc parliamentary faction.

On 10 January 2019 Kryvenko was chosen the People's Movement of Ukraine candidate in the 2019 Ukrainian presidential election and their chairman. In the election he received 0.04% of the vote.

In the 2019 Ukrainian parliamentary election Kryvenko failed to win a seat as People's Movement of Ukraine candidate in constituency 151 situated in Poltava Oblast. From May 28, 2017 to July 10, 2021, he was the chairman of the People's Movement of Ukraine political party.
