= Arkadiy Kornatskyi =

Ukrainian politician

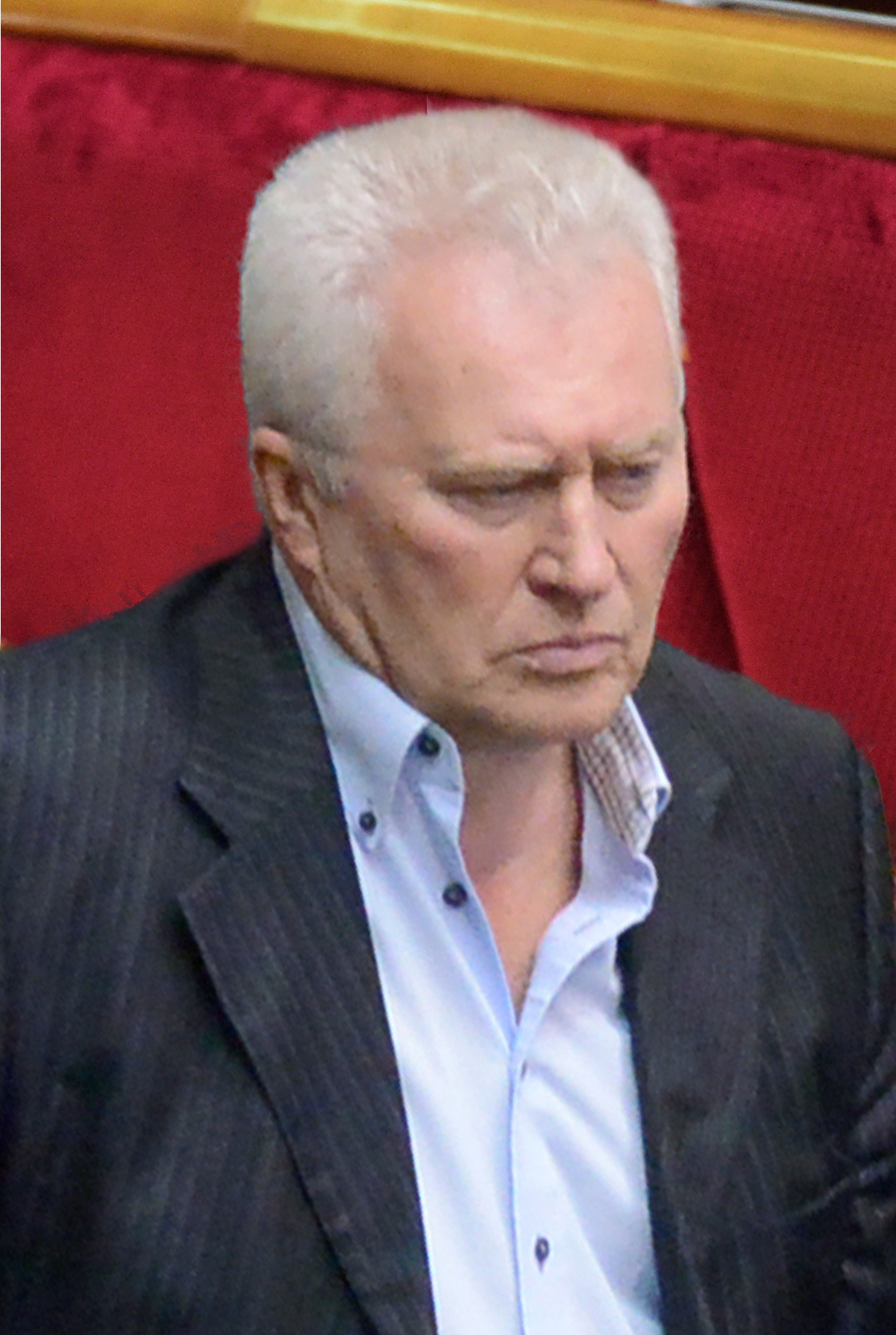
Kornatskyi in 2016

Arkadiy Oleksiyovych Kornatskyi (Ukrainian: Аркадій Олексійович Корнацький; born July 7, 1953) is a Ukrainian politician, public figure and civil servant. He is a member of the Petro Poroshenko Bloc and was a People's Deputy of the 8th Ukrainian Verkhovna Rada from the 2014 Ukrainian parliamentary election until the 2019 Ukrainian parliamentary election. For the 2019 election the Central Election Commission of Ukraine refused to register him.

Kornatskyi was a candidate for President of Ukraine in the 2019 Ukrainian presidential elections. He came 37 out of 39 candidates, with 4,494 votes (0.02%).

== Early life ==
Kornatskyi was born on July 7, 1953, in Chausove Druhe, which was then part of the Ukrainian SSR. In 1970 he started working as a handyman at the collective farm "Lenin's Way" in his home town, before entering military service in the Soviet Army from 1972 to 1974. In 1980 he graduated from the Patrice Lumumba Peoples' Friendship University of Russia in Moscow with a degree in international law and was certified as an English translator. From 1980 to 1989 he then worked as a lawyer in Moscow and the Moscow region, before becoming a private entrepreneur in 1989 by starting the trading company "Cascade" in Moscow which specialized in office equipment. He then founded various companies in real estate trade and commercial construction, before returning to Ukraine in 1998 and founding the "Agrofirma Kornatskykh", "Kornatskykh Law Firm", and "Kornatskykh Budfirma".

== Personal life ==
He is divorced and has three daughters and a son, all of whom now were born in Moscow and still live in Russia. His son, Pavel, works at the Russian Foreign Ministry. Kornatskyi had dual citizenship until the start of the 2005, when he renounced his Russian citizenship in favor of his Ukrainian citizenship, after scrutiny from Volodymyr Bondarenko and other opposition leaders.
