= Aktsent =

Ukrainian political party

Aktsent Акцент
- Ideology: Liberalism

Aktsent (Ukrainian: Акцент), formally Viche (Ukrainian: Віче; English translation: Union or Council)), is a political party in Ukraine registered in May 1993. Before September 2005 the party was known as Constitutional Democratic Party (Ukrainian: Конституційно-демократична партія; Konstytutsijno-Demokratychna Partija). Between 2005 and 2018 the party was called Viche.

== History ==
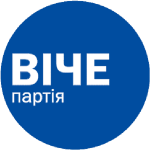
Viche logo

The party was founded by Inna Bohoslovska in 1993.

At the 1998 Ukrainian parliamentary election the party was part of the election bloc "Elephant – Social-Liberal Union" (Ukrainian: Виборчий блок партій "СЛОн – Соціально-Ліберальне Об'єднання") that won 0,90% of the votes and no seats.

At the parliamentary elections on 30 March 2002, the Constitutional Democratic Party was part of the Team of Winter Generation alliance, which didn't pass the 4% electoral threshold and obtained no seats.

At the parliamentary elections on 26 March 2006, it won 1.74% of the popular vote and no seats.

On August 3, 2007, Bohoslovska and other leaders of the party decided to participate in the 2007 parliamentary elections within party list of the Party of regions. Ihor Didkovsky was elected as a new party leader. The party considered a merge into Party of Regions in 2007 and did not participate in the 2007 election; however on June 12, 2009 in Kyiv an extraordinary eleventh party congress took place. After Bohoslovska quit the Party of Regions to take part in the presidential election of the next year in May 2009. she became leader of Viche again.

The party did participate in the 2012 parliamentary elections in 14 simple-majority constituencies but did not win parliamentary representation.

The party did not participate in the 2014 Ukrainian parliamentary election.

In 2018 the party changed to its current name Aktsent.

In the 2020 Ukrainian local elections 8 persons won a local seat on behalf of Aktsent. In the October 2020 Ukrainian local election for the Kharkiv Oblast Council former Governor of Kharkiv Oblast Ihor Baluta was a candidate for the party. He, nor his party, were elected to this regional parliament.

== Ideology ==
Party members see themselves as the heirs of the party, which operated in the early 20th century, and use the theory of modern liberal conservatism (Anglo-Saxon conservatism). In particular, party officials declare, that they represent the interests of the middle class – of businessmen and of intellectuals.
