= S14 (Ukrainian group) =

Ukrainian far-right organization

- Січ
- Formation: 2010
- Headquarters: Vasylkivska Street 3, Kyiv
- Location: Ukraine
- Leader: Yevhen Karas
- Parent organization: Svoboda (2010–2014)

S14, also known as C14 or Sich (Ukrainian: Січ), is a neo-Nazi, Ukrainian nationalist group founded in 2010. In 2018, it gained notoriety for its involvement in violent attacks on Romani camps. In 2020, the group rebranded as Foundation for the Future (Ukrainian: Основа майбутнього, romanized: Osnova maibutnioho).

== History ==
=== Founding ===
S14 was founded in 2010 as the youth wing of the ultranationalist political party Svoboda. S14 was one of the far-right groups active during the Euromaidan movement (November 2013 – February 2014). They were involved with skirmishes with the violent pro-government supporters known as titushky. In November 2017, the group was added to the political violence database of Terrorism Research & Analysis Consortium. In 2018, alongside the Azov Battalion's National Corps party, S14 was recognized by the United States Department of State's Bureau of Democracy, Human Rights, and Labor as a nationalist hate group. In openDemocracy, Denys Gorbach commented that "C14 combine generic 'healthy patriotic' message with subtler hints which can be easily deciphered by members of the subculture (such as the symbolic date of the Roma pogrom on Hitler's birthday or indeed the very name of the organisation)".

=== Relationship with Ukrainian Intelligence (SBU) ===
In 2017, S14 was accused by anti-war, left-wing activist Stas Serhiyenko of having been involved in his stabbing. The day after the attack, S14 leader Yevhen Karas accused Serhiyenko of having supported the 2014 pro-Russian unrest in Kharkiv Oblast and annexation of Crimea by the Russian Federation, and stated that the attack was "far from the first, but not the last, attack on the bacilli of terrorism, hidden in the midst of peaceful Ukrainian streets". In November 2017, S14 was accused by former member Dmytro Riznychenko to have cooperated with the Security Service of Ukraine (SBU), and Karas openly boasted about it.

In 2019 a former intelligence officer of the Security Service of Ukraine (SBU) stated that the SBU had found some common ground with S14 and directed them to carry out some actions against separatists that they could not legally arrest, such as searches and identifications of separatists. The actions also included causing physical harm, such as crashing a car.

=== Involvement in Ukrainian Society ===
In January 2018, S14 counter-protested the annual demonstration commemorating Anastasia Baburova and Stanislav Markelov, two murdered Russian anti-fascists, by shouting the demonstrators down and attacking them with eggs and snowballs; the demonstration has been an annual target of the far right. In March 2018, the Holosiivskyi District of Kyiv signed an agreement allowing to establish a municipal guard headed by a S14 representative to patrol the capital city's streets. This decision was criticized by human rights groups commenting that "Ukraine is sinking into a chaos of uncontrolled violence posed by radical groups and their total impunity. Practically no one in the country can feel safe under these conditions." As in some cases the police arrested peaceful demonstrators rather than the violent perpetrators, such as the January 2018 violence and March 2018 far-right attacks against the International Women's Day marchers, they said that far-right groups, among them S14, were acting under "a veneer of patriotism" and "traditional values", and were allowed by the police and the state to operate under an "atmosphere of near total impunity that cannot but embolden these groups to commit more attacks".

In June 2018, S14 gained international notoriety after reports it was being involved in violent attacks on Romani camps. The day after the attack, Karas posted a blog entry entitled "Separatist Safari", taking responsibility for the assault. He made threats "on the germs of terrorists hiding in the peaceful Ukrainian streets". Amnesty International, Freedom House, Front Line Defenders, and Human Rights Watch signed a "Joint Letter to Ukraine's Minister of Interior Affairs and Prosecutor General Concerning Radical Groups" citing S14, alongside Karpatska Sich, Right Sector, Traditsii i Poryadok, and others, to "have carried out at least two dozen violent attacks, threats, or instances of intimidation in Kyiv, Vinnitsa, Uzhhorod, Lviv, Chernivtsi, Ivano-Frankivsk and other Ukrainian cities". On 14 June 2018, Hromadske Radio reported that Ukraine's Ministry of Youth and Sports was funding S14 to promote "national patriotic education projects", for which the group was awarded almost $17,000. S14 also awarded funds to far-right linked Educational Assembly and Holosiyiv Hideout.

In October 2018, Serhiy Bondar, a young organizer with S14, spoke at an event focused on community safety at the America House Kyiv, which later stated that the invitation was not arranged with them. Radio Free Europe/Radio Liberty (RFERL) correspondent Christopher Miller described it as "disturbing". On 19 November 2018, S14 and fellow far-right Ukrainian nationalist political organizations, among them the Congress of Ukrainian Nationalists, the Organization of Ukrainian Nationalists, and Right Sector, endorsed Ruslan Koshulynskyi in the 2019 Ukrainian presidential election. where he received 1.6% of the votes. In March 2019, a cooperation between S14 and the SBU was announced; the SBU instructed S14 to perform certain tasks that the SBU could not perform for legal reasons. In March 2021, S14 members were elected to the Public Council at the country's Ministry for Veterans Affairs, with whom the group, alongside Azov, has partnered since November 2019; far-right groups and leaders were involved in shaping the ministry, which was formed in November 2018.

On 17 October 2019, an event was arranged by far-right figure Andriy Medvedko, who chairs an organization for veterans of the war in Donbas linked to S14 and is a suspect in the murder of journalist Oles Buzina; the event, a concert attended by, among others, neo-Nazi and Holocaust-denying band Sokyra Peruna, was also attended by then-government ministers, among them Prime Minister Oleksiy Honcharuk and minister Oksana Koliada. Following harsh criticism, Honcharuk justified his presence stating that many different bands had attended the event and that he had visited the place following an invitation from a veteran group, not because he is a fan of Sokyra Peruna.

== Image ==
S14 (as spelled in the Ukrainian alphabet) says it resembles Sich (Ukrainian: Січ), the name given to the administrative and military centres for Cossacks in the 16–18th century. Experts and the Terrorism Research & Analysis Consortium have reported that the number 14 in the group's name has been seen as a reference to the Fourteen Words slogan coined by David Lane, (Note: Lane coined the 14-word slogan, which reads: "We must secure the existence of our people and a future for white children.") an American white supremacist. Academic Anton Shekhovtsov has defined the organization as a "neo-Nazi movement", while sociologist Volodymyr Ishchenko described it as "a neo-Nazi terror group ... whose major activity is harassing and terrorizing opposition journalists, bloggers, and citizens".

S14 leader Yevhen Karas has defended himself from attacks calling him a Nazi and his group being neo-Nazi. According to Karas, his confrontations were mainly with non-Ukrainian ethnic groups that he said controlled the country's political and economic forces, whom he identified as Jews, Poles, and Russians. He stated: "We don't consider ourselves a neo-Nazi organization, we're clearly Ukrainian nationalists." In 2018, former member Dmytro Riznychenko told Radio Svoboda: "C14 are all neo-Nazis. It's quite an appropriate definition." In May 2018, Hromadske wrote: "Most of C14's actions do seem to be directed at Russia, or those sympathetic towards Russia." Political scientist Andreas Umland said that S14 "could qualify as neo-Nazi", as did Vyacheslav Likhachev, author of the 2018 Freedom House report on the far right in Ukraine, and other far-right researchers or political scientists like Anna Hrytsenko, Ivan Katchanovski, and Branislav Radelic. Likhachev said that S14 members decorated the captured Kyiv City State Administration's building during the Euromaidan with neo-Nazi symbolism and flags, which they continue to use. In June 2018, Radio Free Europe/Radio Liberty reported that members of the group had openly expressed neo-Nazi views. After one member updated his Facebook image to that of him speaking at America House Kyiv, Halya Coynash wrote an article titled "Neo-Nazi C14 vigilantes appear to work with Kyiv police in latest 'purge' of Roma in Ukraine".

On 6 August 2019, the Commercial Court of Kyiv ruled in favour of S14 after a 4 May 2018 tweet from Hromadske, which appealed, referred to the group as neo-Nazi. After the ruling, Hromadske published "The Neo-Nazis Who Don't Want to Be Called Neo-Nazis", reporting: "The court noted that the information circulated by Hromadske back in May 2018 'harms the reputation' of C14 and ordered Hromadske to refute the information and pay ₴3,500 ($136) in court fees to C14. Hromadske maintains that it has the right to use such terminology." The ruling was criticized by human rights groups, journalists, and both national and international observers, with the Organization for Security and Co-operation in Europe's Office of the Representative on Freedom of the Media expressing concern because it "goes against #mediafreedom and could discourage journalistic work" in Ukraine. International news outlets like Al Jazeera, Bellingcat, La Croix, The Economist, The Guardian, Haaretz, The Nation, Reuters, Radio Free Europe/Radio Liberty, and The Washington Post, as well as the Parliament of the United Kingdom, and human rights organizations like the European Roma Rights Centre, Hope not Hate, the Kharkiv Human Rights Protection Group, PEN Ukraine, ROMEA, and the United States Holocaust Memorial Museum, among others, have referred to S14 as a neo-Nazi group. The ruling of the Commercial Court of Kyiv was upheld on 7 November 2019. The day prior, Matthew Schaaf, the director of Freedom House in Ukraine, said that the ruling "could seriously damage media coverage of important events in Ukraine in conditions where many media and journalists already apply self-censorship". After the ruling, critics argued that it was not sufficient that neo-Nazi is offensive, it must also be false, which the court did not establish because it ignored the views of experts. On 21 January 2020, the Supreme Court of Ukraine rejected Hromadske's appeal, and the case was taken to the European Court of Human Rights.

== Rebranding ==
In autumn 2019, S14 leader Yevhen Karas announced the creation of the new political movement "Society for the Future", which has the objective of uniting several radical nationalist groups, including S14, Misanthropic Division and some veterans of the disbanded OUN Battalion. In March 2020 S14 officially rebranded into the "Foundation for the Future" (Ukrainian: Основа майбутнього, romanized: Osnova maibutnioho), which will act as the youth wing of the Society for the Future.
