= Yuriy Derevyanko =

Ukrainian entrepreneur and politician

- Юрій Дерев'янко
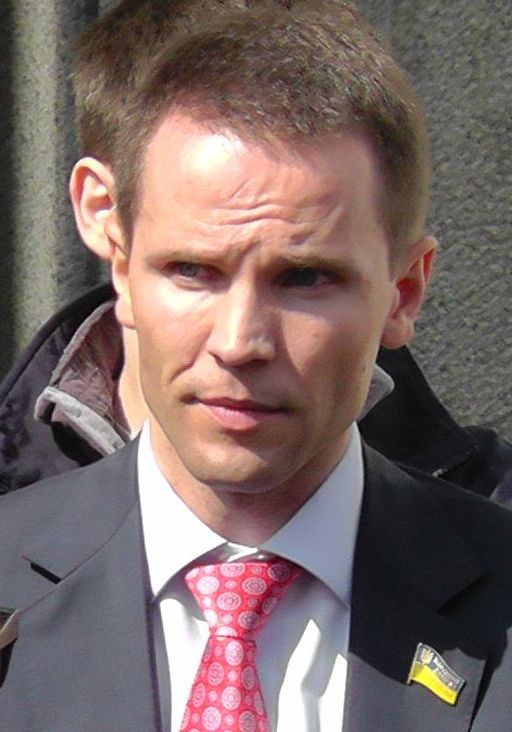

People's Deputy of Ukraine
- In office 12 December 2012 – 29 August 2019
- Preceded by: Constituency re-established
- Succeeded by: Zinovii Andriiovych
- Constituency: Ivano-Frankivsk Oblast, No. 87

Personal details
- Born: 7 May 1973 (age 53) Nadvirna, Ukrainian SSR, Soviet Union (now Ukraine)
- Party: Party of Industrialists and Entrepreneurs of Ukraine; Front for Change; Volia; Movement of New Forces
- Spouse: Anastasia
- Children: 3
- Education: Kyiv National Economic University
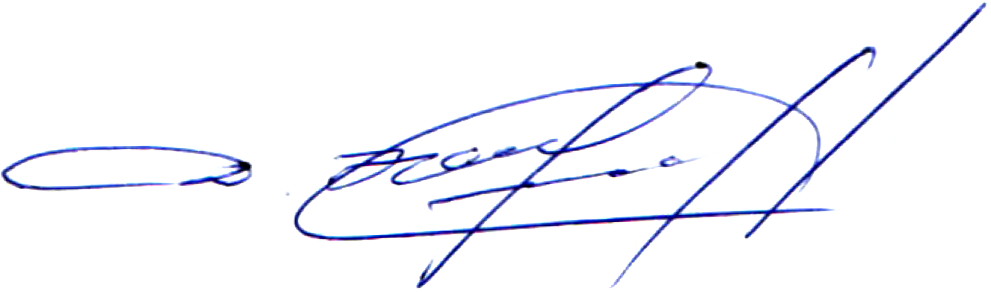
- Signature
- Website: derevyanko.io

Yuriy Bohdanovych Derevyanko (Ukrainian: Юрій Богданович Дерев'янко; born 7 May 1973) is a Ukrainian entrepreneur and politician. People's Deputy of Ukraine of the VIIth and VIIIth convocations. Derevyanko was a member of the Verkhovna Rada Committee on Corruption Prevention and Counteraction. He is a member of the Council of Volia party.

From 2010 to 2012 he was a deputy of the Ivano-Frankivsk Oblast Council. In the 2012 Ukrainian parliamentary election Derevyanko was an independent candidate in constituency 87 located in his birthplace Nadvirna, he was elected with 41.53%.

In the 2014 Ukrainian parliamentary election Derevyanko was again a candidate in constituency 87 for Volia, this time he was reelected to parliament with 69.67%. Derevyanko was a candidate for President of Ukraine in the 2019 election. He was not elected, with 0.10% in the first round of the election. Derevyanko did not participate in the 2019 Ukrainian parliamentary election.

== Early life ==
Derevyanko was born on 7 May 1973 in Nadvirna, which was then part of the Ukrainian SSR. His father was an engineer and his mother was a teacher. In 1990 he attempted to enter Kyiv National Economic University after attending Nadvirna Secondary School No. 1, but could not after getting a C− in math during the entrance exam. Deciding to put off education, he went to work in a quarry in Pasichna and afterward worked with freights. He then tried again to enter the university, and eventually passed mathematics and so Derevyanko attended Kyiv National Economic University, graduating with a master's degree in accounting and auditing in 1996. During his studies he first worked as a night guard before doing entrepreneurial activities when the Soviet Union collapsed.
