= Espreso TV =

Ukrainian TV channel

Espreso TV Еспресо TV
- Country: Ukraine
- Broadcast area: Internet
- Headquarters: Kyiv, Ukraine

Programming
- Picture format: 16:9 (Full HD, 1080p)

Ownership
- Key people: Vadim Denisenko and Vitaly Pyrovych (chief editors)

History
- Launched: November 2013

Links
- Website: espreso.tv

Availability

Terrestrial
- Zeonbud (Ukraine): MUX3 (26) (DVB-T2)
- Zeonbud (Ukraine): MUX5 in Bila Tserkva (DVB-T2)
- Ekspres-Inform (Ukraine): Local MUX in Kyiv (DVB-T)
- Telecentras (Lithuania): Local MUX BM TV in various regions (DVB-T)

Streaming media
- LIVE: LIVE

Espreso TV (Ukrainian: Еспресо TV) is an Internet television station in Ukraine that started to operate in November 2013. Espreso TV enabled the Euromaidan protests to be broadcast worldwide.

== Ownership ==
The channel is owned by the media company Goldberry LLC.

Prior to August 2017 99% of Espreso TV belonged to Larysa Knyazhytska, the wife of Mykola Knyazhytsky.

In August 2017 Inna Avakova (the wife of former Minister of Internal Affairs Arsen Avakov) acquired 40% of Goldberry LLC and Arseniy Yatsenyuk (former Prime Minister) acquired 30%; the remaining 30% of Goldberry LLC stayed in the possession of Larysa Knyazhytska.

In December 2017 the US Atmosphere Entertainment became a major shareholder of Espreso TV by purchasing 77.5% stake in Goldberry LLC that runs Espreso TV in Ukraine. The final beneficiary of the US company is Ivan Zhevago.

== History ==
On 22 January 2014, a journalist of Espreso TV Dmytro Dvoychenkov was kidnapped, beaten, and taken to an unknown location. He was later released.

== Cyber attacks ==
On February 19, 2024, at around 7:30 p.m., unknown hackers gained access to the broadcast signal of the Espreso TV channel.

The attackers broadcast a short footage of destroyed Ukrainian cities and a video of Joe Biden falling and stumbling with a call to stop, hinting at the alleged involvement of the United States in the war in Ukraine.

On December 16, 2024, at around 12:50 p.m., attackers gained unauthorized access to the TV channel’s server and tried to broadcast a video with a fake appeal from Ukrainian President Volodymyr Zelenskyy in Russian.
