= List of ambassadors of Russia to Ukraine =

Ambassador of the Russian Federation to Ukraine
- Emblem of the Russian Foreign Ministry
- Incumbent; Vacant
- Ministry of Foreign Affairs; Embassy of Russia in Kyiv
- Style: His Excellency; The Honourable
- Reports to: Minister of Foreign Affairs
- Seat: Kyiv
- Appointer: President of Russia
- Term length: At the pleasure of the president
- Website: Embassy of Russia in Ukraine

The ambassador of Russia to Ukraine was the official representative of the president and the government of the Russian Federation to the president and the government of Ukraine.

The ambassador and his staff worked at large in the Russian embassy in Kyiv. There were consulates-general in Kharkiv, Lviv, and Odesa. Diplomatic relations were broken off following the Russian invasion of Ukraine in 2022, and there are currently no official diplomatic relations between the two countries.

== History of diplomatic relations ==
With the process of the dissolution of the Soviet Union, the Ukrainian Soviet Socialist Republic declared independence on 24 August 1991, later ratified by an independence referendum on 1 December. Ukrainian indepencence was recognized by the Russian Soviet Federative Socialist Republic on 5 December 1991, and following the dissolution of the Soviet Union and the RSFSR becoming the Russian Federation, formally established diplomatic relations on 14 February 1992. Leonid Smolyakov was appointed the first ambassador on 14 February 1992. The last Russian ambassador to Ukraine was Mikhail Zurabov, who remained in post until 2016, though representation was in effect by chargé d'affaires since 2014, following the Russian annexation of Crimea and the outbreak of the War in Donbas that year. The remaining diplomatic staff left Ukraine on 23 February 2022, the day before the Russia launched an invasion of Ukraine. Ukraine broke off diplomatic relations with Russia on the day of the invasion, and they have remained suspended during the ongoing war.

== List of representatives of Russia to Ukraine (1991–present) ==
Name	Title	Appointment	Termination	Notes
Leonid Smolyakov	Ambassador	14 February 1992	24 May 1996	
Yuri Dubinin	Ambassador	24 May 1996	6 August 1999	
Ivan Aboimov	Ambassador	6 August 1999	21 May 2001	
Viktor Chernomyrdin	Ambassador	21 May 2001	11 June 2009	
Mikhail Zurabov	Ambassador	6 August 2009	28 July 2016	
Andrey Vorobyov	Chargé d'affaires	23 February 2014	7 June 2014	
Sergey Toporov	Chargé d'affaires	28 July 2016	16 November 2016	
Aleksandr Lukashik	Chargé d'affaires	16 November 2016	10 February 2022	
Vladimir Zheglov	Chargé d'affaires	10 February 2022	24 February 2022	
Russo-Ukrainian war (2022–present) - Diplomatic relations interrupted

== See also ==
- List of ambassadors of Ukraine to Russia
