= Mikhail Zurabov =

Russian politician and diplomat (born 1953)

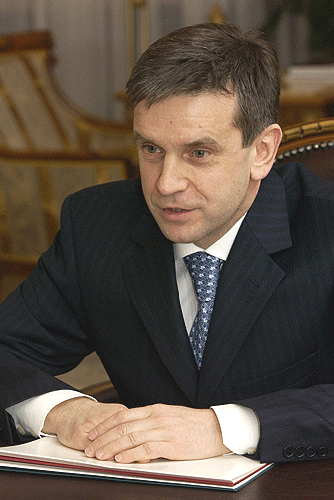
Zurabov in 2004

Mikhail Yuryevich Zurabov (Russian: Михаил Юрьевич Зурабов, pronounced [mʲɪxɐˈil zʊˈrabəf]) is a Russian politician. He was the ambassador of Russia to Ukraine (2009–2016) and former Minister of Health and Social Development (in Mikhail Fradkov's first and second cabinets). He held the post of Minister of Health and Social Development from 9 March 2004 to 24 September 2007.

On 13 August 2009, Zurabov was appointed ambassador of Russia to Ukraine, replacing former prime minister Viktor Chernomyrdin in that role. However, on 11 August 2009, Russian president Medvedev postponed the sending of a new Russian ambassador to Ukraine "in view of the anti-Russian position of the current Ukrainian authorities". Zurabov presented his diplomatic credentials to (newly elected) Ukrainian president Viktor Yanukovych on 2 March 2010.

== Biography ==
Zurabov was born on 3 October 1953. He completed his undergraduate degree at the State University of Management in Moscow, and his master's degree at the All Union Scientific Research Institute for System Research under Stanislav Shatalin. He held the position of Chairman of the Pension Fund of the Russian Federation from 1999 to 2004.

Zurabov is married to Yulia. They have a biological daughter Anastasia, and one grandson. In 2006 they adopted a young boy. Zurabov has a brother, Alexander (born 1956), a financier and co-owner of Vneshprombank.

== Relations with Ukraine ==
Zurabov speaks Russian and Ukrainian.

In an interview with Izvestiya v Ukraine in June 2010 Zurabov, as an ambassador to Ukraine, asserted that Russians and Ukrainians are a single nation with "some nuances, peculiarities, but a single nation". Zurabov allowed himself to announce the Ukrainian anthem "Ukraine has not perished" as a Russian folk song that was to be performed by the Cossack choir during Russia Day in June 2012.
