= Ukraine's 12th electoral district =

No.12
- Former single-mandate constituency
- Province: Vinnytsia Oblast
- Polling divisions: 116
- Population: 177,501 (2019)
- Major settlements: Vinnytsia, 2 urban-type settlements, 33 villages

Former single-mandate constituency
- Created: 1998
- Abolished: 2006
- Seats: Single MP
- Re-established: 2012
Current MP
Anatoliy Drabovskyi
Servant of the People
(Since 2019)
33.2%

Electoral district 12 (Ukrainian: Одномандатний виборчий округ №12, Odnomandatnyi vyborchyi okruh №12), shortened to OVO No.12 (Ukrainian: ОВО №12) is one of 225 electoral districts that elects a member of parliament (people's deputy) to the Verkhovna Rada, Ukraine's national parliament.

The district was originally established for the 1998 Ukrainian parliamentary election under mixed electoral system. It was abolished ahead of the 2006 parliamentary election following the adoption of a fully proportional electoral system, before being re-established in its current form for the 2012 Ukrainian parliamentary election, after two parliamentary elections under the PR system.

In its current form, it comprises the eastern part of the city of Vinnytsia and the settlements located east of the city. Within Vinnytsia, the district boundary generally follows the Southern Bug River, although it also includes several settlements west of the city.

As of 2019, the constituency was home to 177,501 electors and had 116 polling stations.

The district is notable for having been represented by the former President of Ukraine Petro Poroshenko, who served as its People's Deputy for three convocations before his election to the presidency. Between 2014 and 2019, in the 8th Ukrainian Verkhovna Rada, the district was represented by his son, Oleksii Poroshenko. Since 2019, it has been represented by Anatoliy Drabovskyi of the Servant of the People party.

== Location ==
The district is located in the north-central part of Vinnytsia Oblast (province) . It comprises the eastern part of the city of Vinnytsia and part of Vinnytsia Raion situated on the eastern bank of the Southern Bug. Within Vinnytsia, the river forms most of the district's western boundary, with the opposite bank belonging to Electoral District No. 11. The district also contains two exclaves to the north-west and south-west of Vinnytsia, which are separated from the main body of the district by Electoral Districts No. 11 and No. 14.

It borders Electoral District No. 13 to the north, Electoral District No. 18 to the east, Electoral District No. 14 to the west and south, and Electoral District No. 11 to the west.

== History ==
The electoral district was established in 1998 in preparation for the upcoming 29 March parliamentary election, carved out of the No.55 single-mandate constituency after a redistricting. For the 1998, 2002, 2012, 2014, and the 2019 parliamentary elections, Ukraine used a mixed-member proportional representation system to elect MPs, with half of the parliament's 450 seats being elected on a proportional representation system, with the other half elected on a first-past-the-post system in 225 single-mandate constituencies.

During the 2006 and 2007 parliamentary elections, all of the 225 single-mandate constituencies were replaced with territorial constituencies. During these elections, Vinnytsia was represented by the No.9 territorial constituency (Ukrainian: Територіальний виборчий округ №9, Terytorial’nyi vyborchyi okruh №9), which was in effect a combination of the 11th and 12th districts of previous elections.

== List of deputies ==
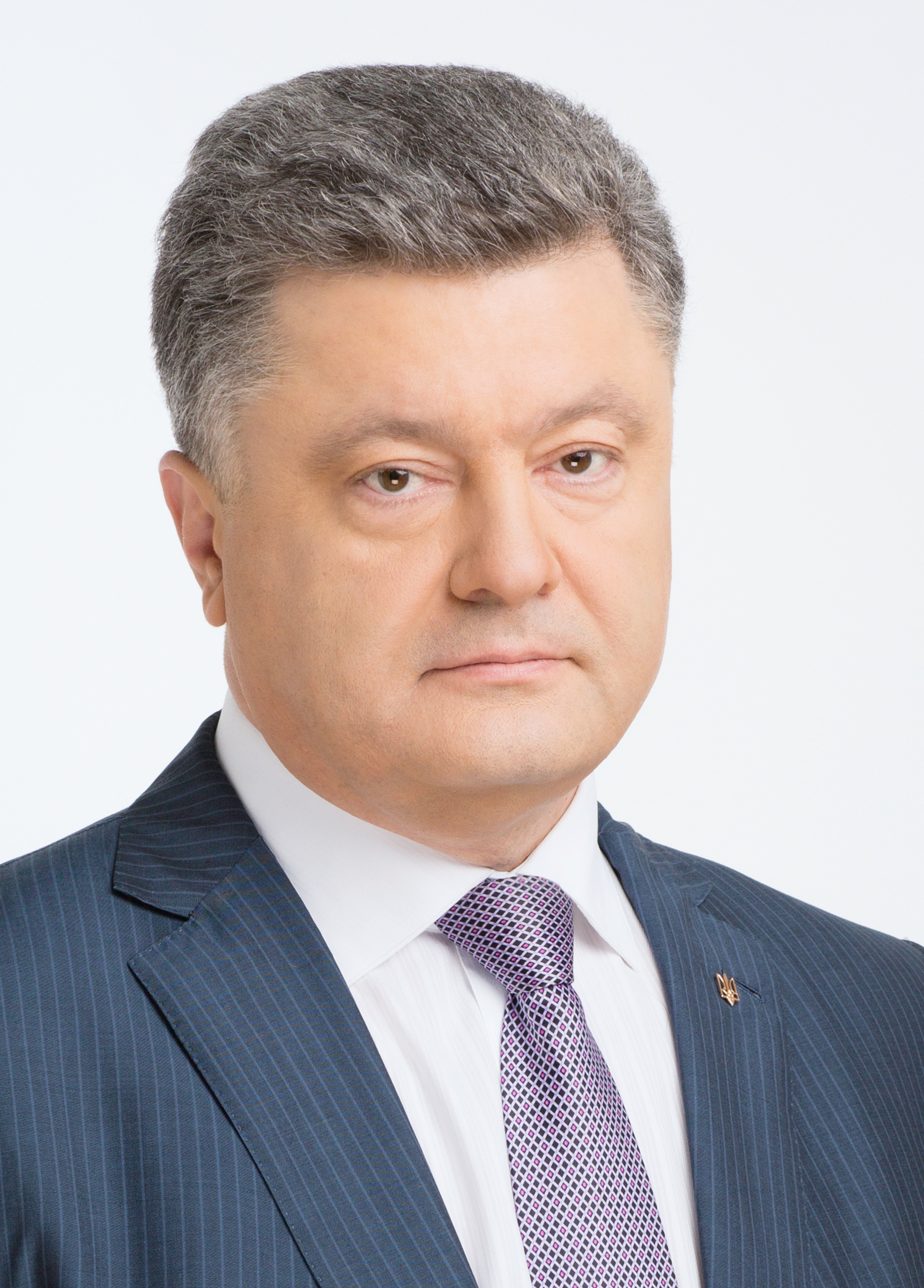
Petro Poroshenko, the district's MP (1998–2006, 2012–2014) and the President of Ukraine (2014–2019).

Convocation	MP	Term of office		Percent	Votes	Elected as	Refs.
I	Represented by No.24, No.25, and No.31 electoral constituencies						
II	Represented by No.47, No.49, and No.55 electoral constituencies						
III	Petro Poroshenko	12 May 1998	14 May 2002	18.2	18,809	Independent	
IV	Petro Poroshenko	14 May 2002	8 September 2005	51.7	53,058	Our Ukraine Bloc	
IV	Vacant	8 September 2005	25 May 2006	-	-	Vacant	
V	No.12 single-mandate constituency abolished—No.9 territorial constituency established						
VI	No.12 single-mandate constituency abolished—No.9 territorial constituency established						
VII	Petro Poroshenko	12 December 2012	3 June 2014	71.5	73,493	Independent	
VII	Vacant	3 June 2014	27 November 2014	-	-	Vacant	
VIII	Oleksiy Poroshenko	27 November 2014	29 August 2019	64.0	62,359	Petro Poroshenko Bloc	
IX	Anatoliy Drabovskyi	29 August 2019	Incumbent	33.2	26,541	Servant of the People	

== Election results ==
Although the No.12 single-mandate constituency was established for four of Ukraine's parliamentary elections, this area is represented by the No.12 territorial constituency for presidential elections, as was the case in 1999, 2004, 2010, and 2014. Accordingly, this presidential election constituency voted for President Leonid Kuchma in 1999, President Viktor Yushchenko in 2004, front-runner Prime Minister Yulia Tymoshenko in 2010, and President Poroshenko himself in 2014.

=== Parliamentary elections ===
1998

The Roshen Confectionery Corporation, owned by the district's former MP Petro Poroshenko, is located within the constituency's boundaries.

At the time of the election, 32-year-old Petro Poroshenko was chairman of the supervisory board of the Vinnytsia Confectionery Factory and ran as an independent candidate. He was elected to the Verkhovna Rada from the newly created district for the first time, narrowly defeating his closest rival Volodymyr Skomarovskyi, also an independent candidate by just 58 votes (or 0.06%).

1998 Ukrainian parliamentary election
Party	Candidate	Votes	%
Independent	Petro Poroshenko	18,809	18.20
Independent	Volodymyr Skomarovskyi	18,751	18.14
Independent	Dmytro Dvorkis	12,052	11.66
Independent	Yuriy Ulitich	9,884	9.56
Independent	Viktor Malynovskyi	7,700	7.45
SPU	Nina Markovska	6,728	6.51
All-Ukrainian Workers' Party	Andriy Reva	4,622	4.47
Rukh	Illia Shutov	3,107	3.01
Independent	Anatoliy Balan	2,498	2.42
Razom (LPU–PP)	Lidiya Melnychuk	1,798	1.74
Independent	Serhiy Haystruk	1,762	1.71
Independent	Mykola Yavorovenko	1,255	1.21
PSPU	Valeriy Horbenko	1,035	1.00
UNA–UNSO	Serhiy Chumak	978	0.95
Others		5,619	5.44
Against all		6,758	6.54
Majority		58	0.06
Total votes		103,356	100.0
Rejected ballots		4,474	4.14
Turnout		107,830	68.84
Registered electors		156,641	
Independent win (new seat)			

2002

In the 2002 parliamentary election, Poroshenko contested the district as a candidate of Our Ukraine, led by Viktor Yushchenko, rather than as an independent candidate. He was re-elected, securing an increased majority and defeating his closest challenger Hennadiy Papush of the Communist Party of Ukraine by 44.7 percentage points. The opposition vote was highly fragmented among several candidates, while 12.6% of voters chose the “against all” option.

2002 Ukrainian parliamentary election
Party	Candidate	Votes	%	±%
Our Ukraine	Petro Poroshenko	53,058	51.7	New
KPU	Hennadiy Papush	7,181	7.0	New
Unity (Ye–SDS–UPS)	Viktor Vikaliuk	5,174	5.1	New
Independent	Zinayida Kadynska	3,695	3.6	New
KPU(o)	Viktor Matviychuk	2,490	2.4	New
Independent	Oleh Kolesnyk	2,270	2.2	New
Party of Free Democrats	Valeriy Bilous	2,120	2.1	New
Independent	Kostiantyn Sarkisov	1,956	1.9	New
Independent	Olena Pryshchenko	1,926	1.9	New
Others		9,708	9.5	N/A
Against all		12,960	12.6	▲6.1
Majority		45,877	44.7	▲44.6
Total votes		102,538	100.0	
Rejected ballots		3,585	3.4	▼0.7
Turnout		106,123	66.1	▼2.7
Registered electors		160,541		
Our Ukraine gain from Independent				

Following the abolition of single-member electoral districts and the introduction of a fully proportional electoral system, Poroshenko contested the 2006 parliamentary election from the Our Ukraine party list and was elected to the 5th Verkhovna Rada.

2012

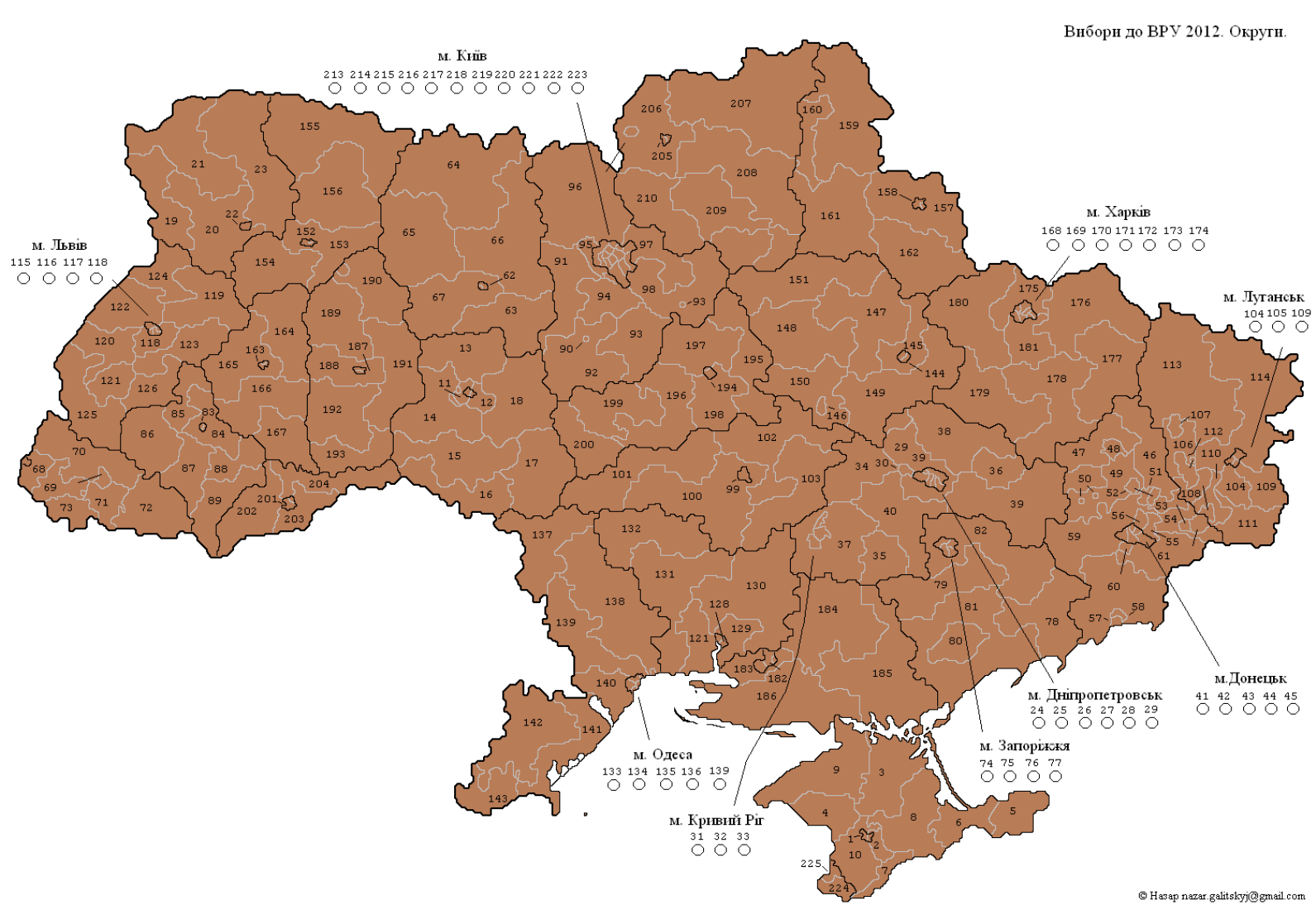
Map of the single-mandate districts which were used for the 2012 and 2014 parliamentary elections.

The election was a landslide victory for Petro Poroshenko, who, running as an independent candidate, won the district with 71.5% of the vote, defeating his closest challenger Volodymyr Bazeliuk of the Svoboda party by 62.4 percentage points. The result marked Poroshenko's return to Parliament as the district's representative after the reintroduction of single-member districts in 2012.

2012 Ukrainian parliamentary election
Party	Candidate	Votes	%
Independent	Petro Poroshenko	73,493	71.5
Svoboda	Volodymyr Bazeliuk	9,375	9.1
Independent	Borys Maksymchuk	5,308	5.2
Independent	Yuriy Iordanov	4,636	4.5
KPU	Ivan Bondarchuk	3,703	3.6
UDAR	Oleh Barchyshen	3,245	3.2
Party of Regions	Dmyro Kostyrko	2,597	2.5
KUN	Oleh Dmytriv	390	0.4
Majority		64,118	62.4
Total votes		102,747	100.0
Rejected ballots		2,037	1.9
Turnout		104,784	59.7
Registered electors		175,454	
Independent win (new seat)			

After being elected President of Ukraine, Poroshenko resigned his parliamentary mandate on 3 June 2014 . As a result, the seat remained vacant until the next parliamentary election.

2014

In the 2014 parliamentary election, the district was won by Oleksii Poroshenko, the son of President Petro Poroshenko, whose candidacy attracted significant media attention. At the time, Oleksii Poroshenko was a deputy general director of a food company and a member of Vinnytsia Oblast Council. Running for the Petro Poroshenko Bloc, he won the election in a landslide with 64.0% of the vote, defeating his closest rival Oleksandr Slobodianiuk of the Self Reliance party by 50.1% margin. Petro Poroshenko stated that the decision to contest the single-member district was made independently by his son.

In the nationwide proportional vote, the Petro Poroshenko Bloc received 44.1% of the vote in the district, its highest result among electoral districts fully under Ukrainian government control.

2014 Ukrainian parliamentary election
Party	Candidate	Votes	%	±%
Petro Poroshenko Bloc	Oleksiy Poroshenko	62,359	64.0	New
Self Reliance	Oleksandr Slobodianiuk	13,538	13.9	New
Batkivshchyna	Serhiy Sitarskiy	6,559	6.7	New
Radical Party	Volodymyr Sych	3,133	3.2	New
Independent	Alla Alieksientseva	2,739	2.8	New
KPU	Volodymyr Sych	2,103	2.2	▼1.4
Independent	Vasyl Litskiy	1,444	1.5	New
Opposition Bloc	Dmytro Kostyrko	1,394	1.4	New
Independent	Liudmyla Mayster	1,073	1.1	New
Strong Ukraine	Valentyn Didur	991	1.0	New
Others		2,039	2.1	N/A
Majority		48,821	50.1	▼12.3
Total votes		97,372	100.0	
Rejected ballots		3,398	3.4	▲1.5
Turnout		100,770	56.8	▼2.9
Registered electors		177,262		
Petro Poroshenko Bloc gain from Independent				

2019

Oleksii Poroshenko did not seek re-election in 2019. The district was won by Anatoliy Drabovskyi of the Servant of the People party, marking a significant 42.1 percentage-point swing from the Petro Poroshenko Bloc.

In the nationwide proportional representation vote held in the district, European Solidarity, the successor party led by Petro Poroshenko, finished third with 10.3% of the vote, behind Servant of the People and Groysman’s Ukrainian Strategy.

The district also had the lowest turnout among all electoral districts in Vinnytsia Oblast, with 47.3% of voters casting ballots, 10 percentage points lower than in the 2014 election.

2019 Ukrainian parliamentary election
Party	Candidate	Votes	%	±%
Servant of the People	Anatoliy Drabovskyi	26,541	33.2	New
European Solidarity	Olena Verlan-Kulshenko	10,486	13.1	▼50.9
Batkivshchyna	Liudmyla Vakoliuk	8,320	10.4	▲3.7
Independent	Leonid Martsynkovskyi	7,913	9.9	New
SiCh	Serhiy Kryveshko	5,920	7.4	New
Self Reliance	Volodymyr Okolita	4,466	5.6	▼8.3
Opposition Platform	Serhiy Hrushko	3,937	4.9	New
Svoboda	Volodymyr Bezeliuk	3,900	4.9	New
Independent	Viktoriya Halitska	2,685	3.4	New
Opposition Bloc	Denys Mazurenko	1,588	2.0	▲2.0
Others		4,121	5.1	N/A
Total votes		79,877	100.0	
Rejected ballots		2,894	3.5	▲0.1
Turnout		82,771	46.6	▼10.2
Registered electors		177,494		
Servant of the People gain from Petro Poroshenko Bloc		Swing	▲42.1	

=== Presidential elections ===
2014

In the 2014 presidential election, Petro Poroshenko, the district's People’s Deputy at the time, won in it with 75.2% of the vote, recording his best result among all electoral districts in Ukraine where the election took place.

Candidate	Party	Votes	%
Petro Poroshenko	Independent (UDAR)	82,494	75.21
Yulia Tymoshenko	Batkivshchyna	11,576	10.55
Anatoliy Hrytsenko	Civil Position	4,662	4.25
Oleh Liashko	Radical Party	4,191	3.82
Serhiy Tihipko	Independent (Strong Ukraine)	1,530	1.39
Olha Bohomolets	Independent	1,089	0.99
Oleh Tyahnybok	Svoboda	971	0.89
Vadim Rabinovich	Independent	843	0.77
Petro Symonenko	Communist Party of Ukraine	581	0.53
Dmytro Yarosh	Right Sector	540	0.49
Mykhailo Dobkin	Party of Regions	425	0.39
Others		785	0.72
Total		109,687	100.00
Valid votes		109,687	99.23
Invalid/blank votes		850	0.77
Total votes		110,537	100.00
Registered voters/turnout		153,930	71.81

2019

First round

Candidate	Party	Votes	%
Petro Poroshenko	Independent (BPP)	31,819	27.48
Volodymyr Zelenskyy	Servant of the People	28,535	24.65
Yulia Tymoshenko	Batkivshchyna	16,270	14.05
Ihor Smeshko	Independent	13,789	11.91
Anatoliy Hrytsenko	Civil Position	8,240	7.12
Yuriy Boyko	Independent (Opposition Platform — For Life)	5,450	4.71
Oleh Liashko	Radical Party of Oleh Liashko	3,666	3.17
Oleksandr Vilkul	Opposition Bloc — Party for Peace and Development	2,545	2.20
Ruslan Koshulynskyi	Svoboda	1,692	1.46
Yuriy Tymoshenko	Independent	816	0.70
Oleksandr Shevchenko	UKROP	477	0.41
Valentyn Nalyvaichenko	Spravedlyvist	293	0.25
Olha Bohomolets	Independent	255	0.22
Roman Bezsmertnyi	Independent	207	0.18
Hennadiy Balashov	5.10	198	0.17
Oleksandr Moroz	Socialist Party of Oleksandr Moroz	116	0.10
Illia Kyva	Socialist Party of Ukraine	37	0.03
Others		1,372	1.19
Total		115,777	100.00
Valid votes		115,777	98.57
Invalid/blank votes		1,678	1.43
Total votes		117,455	100.00
Registered voters/turnout		177,826	66.05
Source: Central Election Commission ()

Second round

Candidate	Party	Votes	%
Volodymyr Zelenskyy	Servant of the People	64,230	58.46
Petro Poroshenko	Independent (BPP)	45,637	41.54
Total		109,867	100.00
Valid votes		109,867	97.24
Invalid/blank votes		3,116	2.76
Total votes		112,983	100.00
Registered voters/turnout		178,003	63.47
Source: Central Election Commission (second round)

== See also ==
- Imperative mandate, Ukrainian constitutional provision
