= Poroshenko (surname) =

Poroshenko (Ukrainian: Пороше́нко) is a Ukrainian surname. Notable people with this surname include:

- Petro Poroshenko (born 1965), Ukrainian politician and former President of Ukraine
- Maryna Poroshenko (born 1962), wife of Petro, former First Lady of Ukraine
  - Oleksiy Poroshenko (born 1985), Ukrainian politician
