= Oleksii Poroshenko =

Ukrainian politician (born 1985)

- Олексій Порошенко
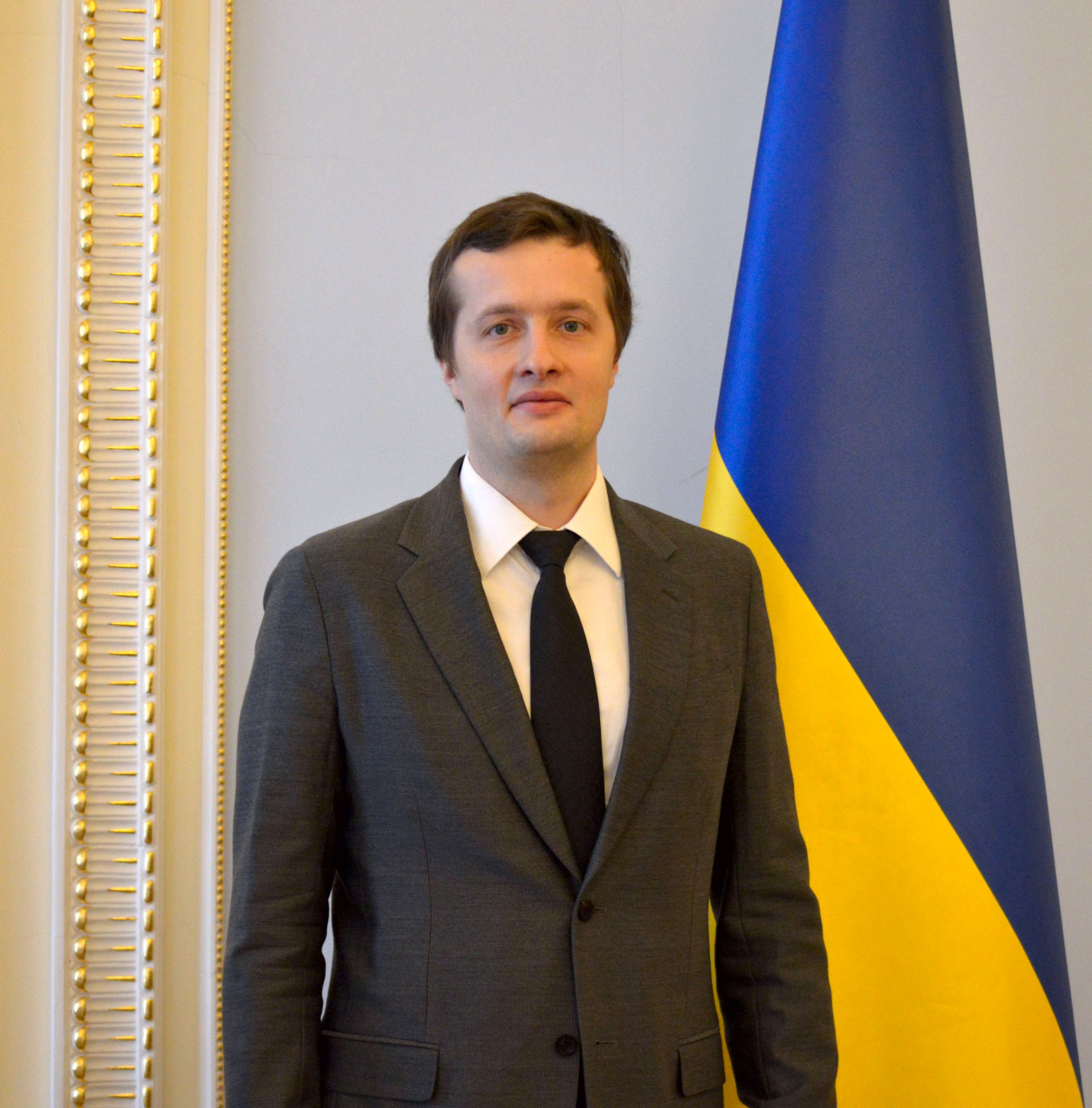
- Poroshenko in 2019

People's Deputy of Ukraine
- In office 27 November 2014 – 29 August 2019
- Preceded by: Petro Poroshenko
- Succeeded by: Anatoliy Drabovskyi
- Constituency: Vinnytsia Oblast, District No.12

Member of the Vinnytsia Oblast Council
- In office 1 March 2013 – 17 December 2014 (Note: Vacated the seat due to being elected as a People’s Deputy at Verkhovna Rada.)
- Preceded by: Hryhoriy Zabolotnyi
- Constituency: No.3

Personal details
- Born: Oleksii Petrovych Poroshenko; 6 March 1985 (age 41) Kiev, Ukrainian SSR, Soviet Union
- Party: European Solidarity
- Children: 2
- Parents: Petro Poroshenko (father); Maryna Poroshenko (mother)
- Education: Taras Shevchenko National University; London School of Economics; INSEAD

Oleksii Petrovych Poroshenko (Ukrainian: Олексій Петрович Порошенко; born 6 March 1985) is a Ukrainian politician and diplomat. He is a former People's Deputy of Ukraine and is the son of former president and business magnate Petro Poroshenko, who has transferred major assets to his son since losing power in 2019.

== Education ==
Oleksii Poroshenko is the eldest son of former Ukrainian president Petro Poroshenko.

In 2002, he graduated from Klovsky Lyceum. From 2001 to 2002 he studied at Eton College in England. From 2002 to 2003 he studied at Winchester College. From 2002 to 2006 he studied at the Taras Shevchenko National University of Kiev, Institute of International Relations. According to research of Kanał Zero, which relies on reports from Kiev academia, he wasn't present at campus while enrolled. From 2004 to 2007 he studied at the London school of Economics. In 2008 he graduated from the Institute of International Relations and the London School of Economics. From 2011 to 2012 he studied at INSEAD business school (Diversity Fund Scholarship) in France and Singapore.

On 1 November 2018, Poroshenko was included in the Russian sanctions list in connection with Ukraine’s unfriendly actions towards citizens and legal entities of the Russian Federation.

== Career ==
In 2006 Poroshenko worked at Merrill Lynch as an analyst.

From 2007 to 2009 he worked for the Confectionery Corporation Roshen as an economist. In 2009, he became a Sales Manager.

During 2009-2010 worked as an adviser for the Ministry of Economy of Ukraine.

From January to August 2010, he was Deputy Head of the trade and economic mission of the Consulate General of Ukraine in China. From August to September 2010 he was acting Deputy Head.

From September 2010 to June 2011 he was Vice-Consul of the Department of Economic Affairs at the Consulate General of Ukraine in Shanghai.

In February 2013, Oleksii Poroshenko ran in the by-election to the Vinnytsia Oblast Council as a candidate of the Batkivshchyna in electoral district No. 3 (Bershad). The by-election was held to replace Hryhoriy Zabolotnyi, who had been elected to the Verkhovna Rada in 2012. Poroshenko won the by-election, defeating his closest rival of the Party of Regions.

In October 2014, Poroshenko was elected Deputy of Ukraine from the Petro Poroshenko Bloc "Solidarity" in the single-mandate constituency №12 in the Vinnytsia region. According to the Central Election Commission, Poroshenko scored 64.0% or over 62 thousand votes, defeating his closest rival Oleksandr Slobodianiuk of the Self Reliance party by 50.1%.

Poroshenko did not take part in the 2019 Ukrainian parliamentary election.

== International activity ==
Head of the inter-parliamentary relations group with the Republic of Singapore.

Member of the Ukrainian delegation to the Inter-Parliamentary Union (IPU). On 11 April 2017 Oleksii Poroshenko speaking at a briefing in the Verkhovna Rada said that Ukraine boycotting the session the Assembly of the inter-Parliamentary Union (IPU) in St. Petersburg and called on other countries to do so.

== Public activity ==
He was a representative in the regional parliament of Vinnytsia Oblast.

During his 2014 participation in the war in Donbas, Oleksii Poroshenko was listed under a different name for conspiracy (Anisenko). The extent of his war service is disputed. According to some sources, he was a mortar gunner and served in Kramatorsk. Other outlets have it that he was the commander of an artillery unit, while some claim that he didn't see any frontline service.

In August 2017, Oleksii Poroshenko completed an internship in public administration (Singapore Cooperation Programme) in Singapore. Singapore sponsored training courses and study visits.

On 21 September 2018, according to the independent analytical platform VoxUkraine, according to the index of support for reforms, Poroshenko entered the top ten most effective people's deputies of the eighth session of the Verkhovna Rada of Ukraine of the eighth convocation, who supported the reform laws.

Poroshenko is an army reserve lieutenant. He left Ukraine before the Russian invasion of 2022 to London, as did his brother. In January 2025, he was fined 25,500 UAH for allegedly ignoring military summonses, and was recognised as an evader. His father's lawyer claimed that Oleksii Poroshenko had left Ukraine to work abroad in 2019 and had subsequently been legally removed from military registration, and claimed that the accusation of evasion was politically motivated.

== Legislative activity ==
Oleksii Poroshenko co-authored the draft law №3150 "on amending article 15 of the Law of Ukraine "on the status of war veterans, guarantees of their social protection" on strengthening the social protection of family members of the victims, adopted by the Verkhovna Rada of Ukraine on 2 February 2016. The bill provides for the abolition of absolutely unfair restrictions in the provision of benefits to the families of those who died defending Ukraine."

Oleksii Poroshenko became the author of a number of legislative initiatives. Among which:

Registration number of the draft law	Registration date	Title of the draft law
1817	22 January 2015	The draft Law on amendments to paragraph 2 "Final provision" Law of Ukraine "On amendments to the Tax code of Ukraine" about release from the taxation of production of defense appointment
2202	23 February 2015	The draft Law on amendments to subsection 2 section XX "Final provisions" Tax code of Ukraine on special personal protective equipment
2203	23 February 2015	Draft Law on amendments to section XXI "Final and transitional provisions" of the Customs code of Ukraine on special personal protective equipment
2599-1	23 April 2015	Draft Law on amendments to the Law of Ukraine "On higher education" regarding the establishment of restrictions on election to office (the appointment of an acting) head of higher education institution
3150	18 September 2015	Draft Law on amendments to article 15 of the Law of Ukraine " On the status of war veterans, guarantees of their social protection" about strengthening of social protection of family members of the victims
3442	10 November 2015	Draft Law on amendments to the labour Code of Ukraine (on the harmonization of legislation in the field of prevention and combating discrimination with the law of the European Union)
4014-а	15 July 2016	The draft Law on amendments to the Law of Ukraine " About sources of financing of road economy of Ukraine" regarding the improvement of the financing mechanism of the road sector
4015-а	15 July 2016	Draft Law on amendments to the Budget code of Ukraine on improvement of the financing mechanism of the road sector
4646-д	16 June 2016	The draft Law on amendments to the Law of Ukraine " About accounting and financial reporting in Ukraine" (concerning the improvement of certain provisions)
6016-д	23 October 2017	Draft Law on audit of financial statements and audit activities
8556	4 July 2018	Draft law On amendments to some legislative acts of Ukraine on access of persons with special educational needs to educational services

== Earnings ==
According to the electronic declaration, in 2015, Oleksii Poroshenko received ₴77,212 (US$3,227) as salary in the Verkhovna Rada. From the state budget, he was granted ₴80,559 compensation for expenses related to deputy activities. Poroshenko had the office in Vinnytsia with an area of 178.5 m², which at the time of acquisition (15 November 2013) cost ₴ 1.8 million (US$219,673). Together with his mother, Oleksii Poroshenko has an apartment in Kiev with an area of 80.66 m². Poroshenko declared three cars: GAZ-14 (Chaika, produced in 1981), BMW 320i Cabrio (produced in 2011, the cost of ₴ 424.64 thousand), and Land Rover Discovery 4.0 (2013, the cost of ₴ 680.4 thousand). On the accounts in the International Investment Bank, Poroshenko had € 15 011, US$141 thousand, and €88 thousand. He also declared ₴ 187 thousand in cash.

"A deputy is a representative of people; he has a wide range of responsibilities. Peoples deputies have access to decision-making, which, in the end, cost the country billions. And wherein they receive 5-6 thousand hryvnias."

— Olexiy Poroshenko, Izvestia in Ukraine, 2016.

In 2016, Poroshenko received ₴152,941 as salary in the Verkhovna Rada. On the accounts in the International Investment Bank, Oleksii Poroshenko had €11,900, US$95,600, and €82,100. He declared ₴317,200 in cash. His spouse, Julia Poroshenko, declared ₴82,988 as salary in the McKinsey & Company Ukraine. Income from insurance payments was ₴953,886. She had 138,879 euros in the bank account of BNP Paribas overseas. On the accounts in the International Investment Bank, Julia Poroshenko had €82,100 and US$95,600. She also had US$304,859 at the Citibank overseas.

== Personal life ==
Oleksii Poroshenko is the son of Maryna Poroshenko and Petro Poroshenko. He has two sisters, the twins Yevheniia and Oleksandra (born 2000), and a brother, Mykhailo (born 2001). Oleksii Poroshenko is married and has a son, born 7 June 2014, and a daughter born in March 2016.

Oleksii Poroshenko is depicted on one of the walls in a church located on the territory of his father's landholding in the VIP village of Kozyn (Koncha-Zaspa historic neighbourhood in the Holosiivskyi District of the city of Kyiv). The estate of Petro Poroshenko is located 13 kilometers from Kyiv along the Novoobuhovskaya highway. The fresco depicts the family of Poroshenko, including Petro Poroshenko with his wife Maryna and children Oleksii, Yevheniia, Oleksandra and Mykhailo. According to the Orthodox icon painter Dmitry Marchenko, the image is similar in terms of style to the paintings of the 19th century Russian painter Ivan Makarov, whose paintings include Emperor Alexander III with his family.
