= Anatoliy Drabovskyi =

Ukrainian scientist and educator

- Анатолій Драбовський
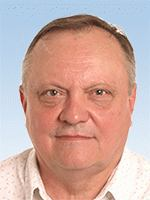
- Official Verkhovna Rada portrait, 2019

People's Deputy of Ukraine
- Incumbent
- Assumed office 29 August 2019
- Preceded by: Oleksiy Poroshenko
- Constituency: Vinnytsia Oblast, No. 12

Personal details
- Born: 1 August 1958 (age 68) Vinnytsia, Ukrainian SSR, Soviet Union
- Party: Servant of the People

Anatoliy Hryhorovych Drabovskyi (Ukrainian: Анатолій Григорович Драбовський; born 1 August 1958) is a Ukrainian scientist and educator. Rector of Vinnytsia Cooperative Institute. People's Deputy of Ukraine of the 9th convocation from the party "Servant of the People".

== Biography ==
Anatoliy Drabovsky was born on 1 August 1958, in the city of Vinnytsia.

He graduated from the Kyiv Institute of Trade and Economics in the specialty of Trade Economics. He is now a Doctor of Economics.

In 1998, he started working as the deputy director of the Vinnytsia Cooperative Technical School for Academic Affairs, and eight months later he headed it. In 2009, he was elected vice president of the Vinnytsia Regional Weightlifting Federation.

In 2016, he established international cooperation with the Higher School of Economics and Law in Kielce, thanks to which a double degree program was introduced.

In 2002 and 2010, he ran for Vinnytsia City Council of the 4th and 6th convocations, respectively.

He was a candidate for People's Deputies from the "Servant of the People" party in the 2019 parliamentary elections (constituency No. 12, Vinnytsia, Vinnytsia district). At the time of the election he was Rector of the Vinnytsia Cooperative Institute. He lives in Vinnytsia; he is non-partisan.

He is a member of the Verkhovna Rada Committee on Budget.
