= Ivan Bondarchuk =

Ukrainian politician (1944–2023)

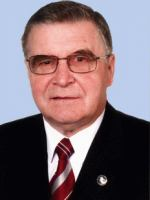
- Bondarchuk in 2006

People's Deputy of Ukraine
- In office 26 April 2006 – 5 June 2007

Personal details
- Born: Ivan Mykolayovych Bondarchuk; 3 April 1944 Starosillia, Luhyny Raion, Zhytomyr Oblast, Ukrainian SSR, USSR
- Died: 15 September 2023 (aged 79) Vinnytsia, Ukraine
- Party: SPU
- Education: Vinnytsia State Pedagogical University; High Political School of the Central Committee of the KPU
- Occupation: Teacher

Ivan Mykolayovych Bondarchuk (Ukrainian: Іва́н Микола́йович Бондарчу́к; 3 April 1944 – 15 September 2023) was a Ukrainian teacher and politician. A member of the Socialist Party of Ukraine, he served in the Verkhovna Rada from 2006 to 2007.

== Biography ==
Bondarchuk was born on 3 April 1944 within the village of Starosillia, which was then part of the Ukrainian SSR in the Soviet Union.

After graduating from secondary school in 1960, he worked as a handyman and electric welder at the businesses "Hvozd" within Myroliubiv. He then started his studies at the Vinnytsia State Pedagogical University, where he graduated from in 1969 in the Faculty of International Languages. During the time, he also taught English at the institute. Afterwards, he was the 2nd then 1st Secretary of the Vinnytsia City Committee representing the Communist Party of Ukraine. He also attended the Higher Party School of the Communist Party of Ukraine in 1976.

Afterwards, he worked within the Zamostyanskyi district in Vinnytsia and returned to the Vinnytsia City Committee until the collapse of the Soviet Union. After the USSR's collapse, he became Director of the Zamostyanskyi Employment Center until 1994 when he became Deputy Chairman then Chairman of the Vinnytsia Oblast Council. In 1998 he became Chairman of the Board of the agricultural JSC "Vinnytsiamiaso", a position he held until his death, and was an assistant-consultant to the People's Deputy of Ukraine, Mykola Melnyk (also of the SPU).

In 2005 he became Deputy Head to the Governor of Vinnytsia Oblast, a position he held until 2006 when he was elected to the Verkhovna Rada during the 2006 Ukrainian parliamentary election. He served in the rada for a year until 2007.

== Personal life ==
Bondarchuk died in Vinnytsia on 15 September 2023, at the age of 79.
