= 5.10 =

Ukrainian political party

- Leader: Yuriy Konovalchuk (2025- present)
- Hennadiy Balashov (2014-2025)
- Founded: 20 March 2014
- Headquarters: Kyiv
- Membership: 1,500
- Ideology: Libertarianism; Minarchism
- Political position: Right-wing
- Slogan: "State, get out of the economy!"
- Verkhovna Rada: 0 / 450
- Regions (2015): 5 / 158,399

Website
- 510.org.ua

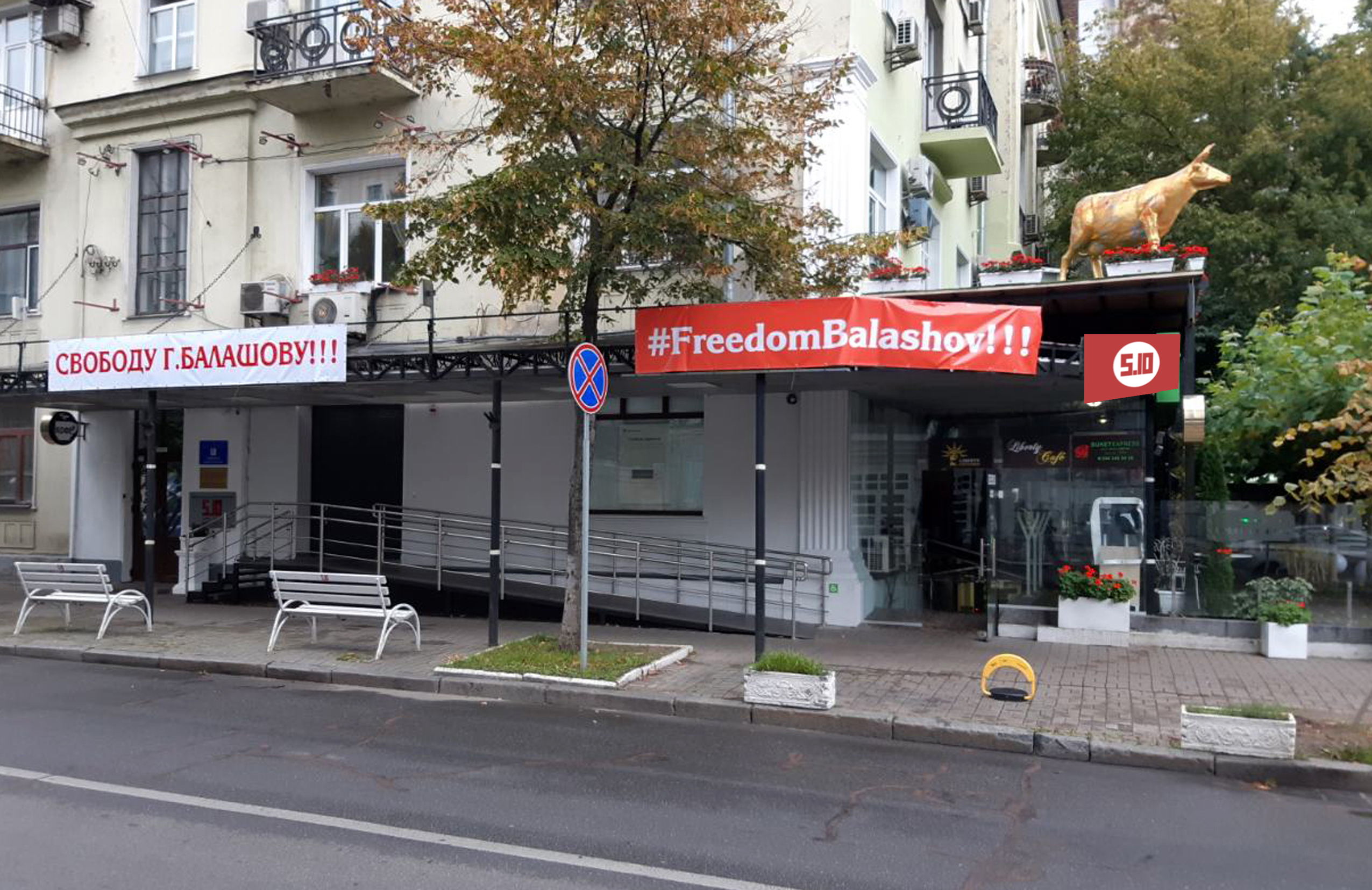
5.10 office building calls for the freedom of Balashov, Kyiv, Ukraine, September 2021

5.10 is a Ukrainian political party, registered on 20 March 2014. The main idea of Hennadiy Balashov and his libertarian party is a radical reform of the taxation of Ukraine: full abolition of the current system and introduction of a single tax system – 5% sales tax and 10% payroll tax.

The main objective of the party is to tackle poverty and governmental control in Ukraine. Its leader Hennadiy Balashov states that he wants to turn Ukraine into a global tax haven, akin to Singapore and Ireland.

In the 2014 Ukrainian parliamentary election the party failed to win seats, garnering 67,124 votes. In front of the backdrop of rising poverty in Ukraine in 2015-2016, party supporters staged mass peaceful protests in Kyiv, Odesa, and other cities to implement the party's program, so the 5.10 party's support base grew significantly Future politician Mykhailo Fedorov was among the candidates this year. The party did not participate in the 2019 Ukrainian parliamentary election.

Yurii Konovalchuk, current leader of the party, 2026

Although the party did not participate in the 2019 Ukrainian parliamentary election, its leader Hennadiy Balashov ran as the party's candidate in the 2019 Ukrainian presidential election.
