= Serhiy Tatusyak =

Ukrainian politician (born 1955)

- Сергій Татусяк
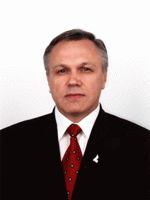
- Tatusyak in 2002

Head of the Vinnytsia Oblast Council
- In office 11 December 2010 – 21 February 2014
- Preceded by: Hryhoriy Zabolotnyi
- Succeeded by: Serhiy Svitko

Member of the Verkhovna Rada
- In office 1 November 2005 – 25 March 2006

Deputy Chairman of the Vinnytsia Regional State Administration
- In office 22 October 1997 – 1 November 2005

Personal details
- Born: Serhiy Pylypovych Tatusyak; 5 April 1955 (age 71) Zhabokrychka, Ukraine, Soviet Union
- Party: Party of Regions

Serhiy Pylypovych Tatusyak (Ukrainian: Сергій Пилипович Татусяк; born 5 April 1955) is a Ukrainian politician and socio-political figure, who served as Head of the Vinnytsia Oblast Council from 2010 to 2014.

He had been the Member of the Verkhovna Rada of the 4th convocation, serving from 2005 to 2006, having served as Deputy Chairman of the Vinnytsia Oblast State Administration from 1997 to 2005.

== Biography ==
Serhiy Tatusyak was born on 5 April 1955 in the village of Zhabokrichka, Chechelnitsky district, Vinnitsa Oblast, to a Ukrainian family. He is an ethnic Ukrainian. His mother, Solomiya Yevhenivna, lives with her daughter, and with Serhiy's sister; his father, Phylyp Kharitonovych, died in October 2015.

At an early age, Tatusyak and his family moved to the village of Balanivka, Bershad district, Vinnytsia region, where he grew up in the family of a forester. Serhiy was educated at a secondary school in the village of Balanivka, where he graduated in 1972.

In 1978, he received higher education at the Vinnitsa State Pedagogical Institute named after N. Ostrovsky, majoring in “Teacher of Physical Education”.

From 1978 to 1980, he worked as a volleyball coach and teacher at Children's Sports School No. 3 in Vinnitsa. For a year he worked as a senior engineer of the regional construction team, and subsequently from 1981 to 1985 - head of the department of defense mass work of the Vinnitsa regional committee of the LKSMU.

Since 1985, he was the Chairman of the Vinnytsia Regional Council of the Kolos Physical Culture and Sports Society.

Between 1994 and 1997, he was the president of the joint-stock company “Football Club “Niva”” in Vinnitsa, which under his management achieved the greatest success - representing Ukraine in European competitions. In 1996, Tatusyak began political activity in the People's Democratic Party of Ukraine (PDP).

On 22 October 1997, Tatusyak was appointed the deputy Governor of Vinnytsia Oblast.

In 1998, he graduated from the Ternopil Academy of National Economy with a degree in Economist.

In 2005, he graduated from the National Academy of Public Administration under the President of Ukraine and received a Master of Public Administration degree.

On 1 November 2005, Tatusyak became a member of parliament, a people’s deputy of the Verkhovna Rada of Ukraine of the 4th convocation from the bloc “For a United Ukraine!”, and was a member of the Committee on State Construction and Local Self-Government.

On 11 November 2010, at the founding session of the Vinnytsia Regional Council of the 6th convocation, Tatusyak was elected chairman of the Vinnytsia Regional Council by an absolute majority of 132 deputies.

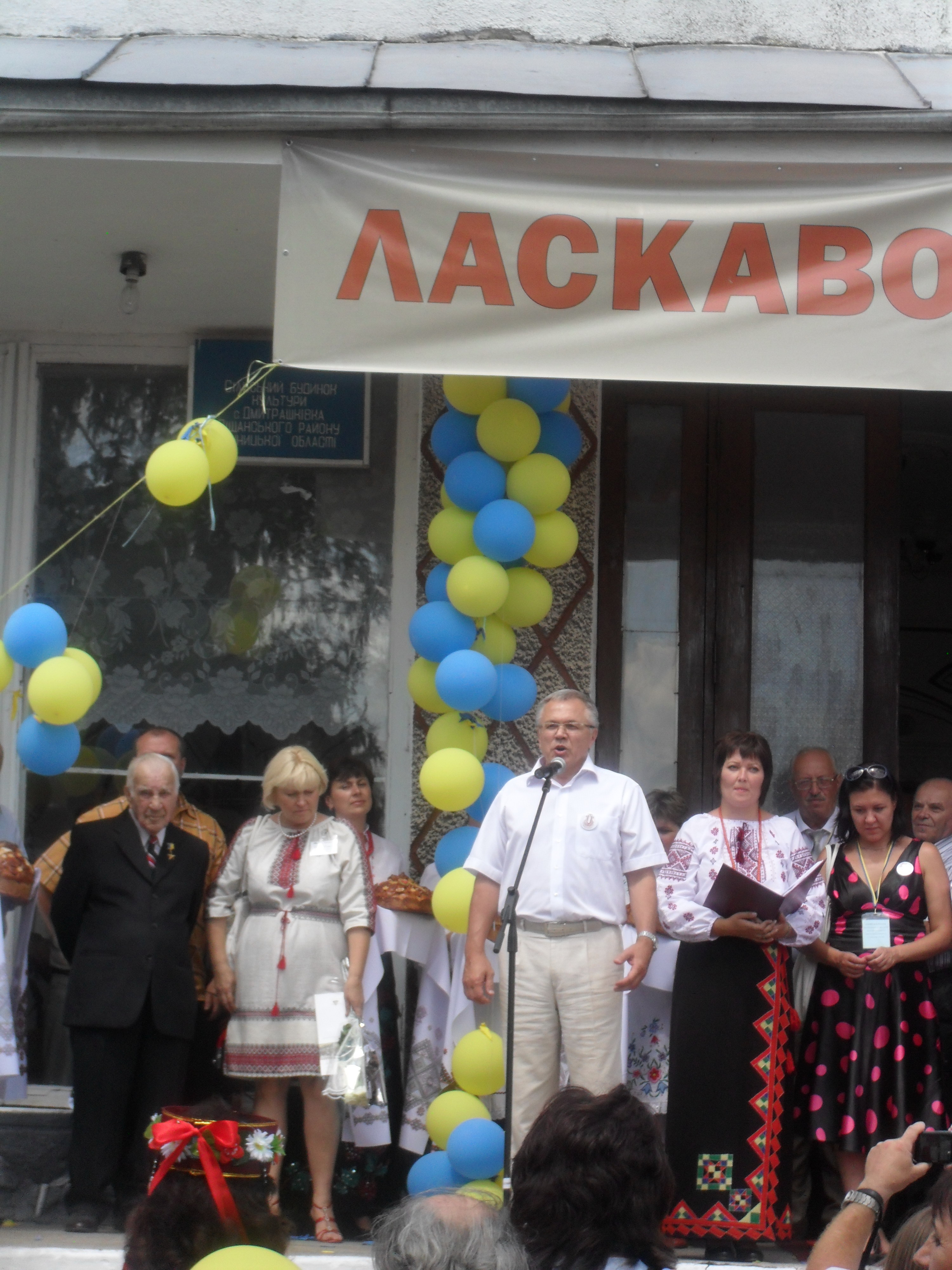
Tatusyak at the opening ceremony of the 3rd International Festival named after Pavlo Muravskyi in the village of Dmitrashkivka in July 2012

In 2012, he defended his PhD thesis on the topic: “Mechanisms of regional governance: formation and implementation in the context of European integration.” Received the title of Candidate of Sciences in Public Administration.

In his position, he continued to pay special attention to the development of civil society, local government reform, decentralization of power and European integration. A group of experts chaired by Tatusyak developed a Concept for reforming local self-government based on the Polish model, which received positive approval from domestic and international experts. The concept was adopted in January 2011 by the session of the Vinnytsia Regional Council. This concept was proposed to the government as the basis for the legislative framework for reform.

On 2 February 2012, Vinnytsia and Moldova officially ratified the agreement on the creation of the Dniester Euroregion. Tatusyak became the chairman of the new cross-border cooperation structure. In October, the presentation of Vinnytsia and the Dniester Euroregion took place in Brussels. Vinnytsia region was the first among all regions of Ukraine to open its representative office in the European capital. During the first year of its activity, "Euroregion" was recognized as the most effective in Ukraine.

Thanks to the public organizations created by Tatusyak, more than $1 million in European grant funds have been attracted for the development of the Vinnytsia region in recent years.

In April 2012, at the founding meeting of authorized representatives of local government bodies of the Vinnytsia region, the Vinnytsia Regional Association of Local Government Bodies (VOAOMS) was created, headed by Tatusyak. The goal of the public organization is to promote the effective exercise by local government bodies of the Vinnytsia region of their powers, local and regional development, and coordination of actions to protect the rights and interests of territorial communities. In January 2016, Anatoly Oliynyk, chairman of the Vinnytsia Regional Council, was elected chairman of the Association.

From 2012 to 2014, Tatusyak was vice-president of the All-Ukrainian Association of District and Regional Councils for Local Self-Government and Administrative-Territorial Structure, and was also elected as an authorized representative in the Cabinet of Ministers of Ukraine from the National Congress of Local Self-Government Bodies.

On 10 February 2014, from the stage of the Vinnytsia Euromaidan, deputy of the Vinnytsia Regional Council Serhiy Svitko read the statement of the Chairman of the Vinnytsia Regional Council Tatusyak and his deputy Ihor Krevskyi about leaving the Party of Regions.

The deputies justified their decision by the fact that they want to preserve peace and understanding in the region, to prevent a repeat assault on the regional state administration building. On 21 February, deputies of the Vinnytsia Regional Council voted to terminate the powers of the head of the regional council Tatusyak and no confidence in the Governor Ivan Movchan.

On 26 February, Serhiy Svitko, a deputy from the "Batkivshchyna" faction of the Voivodeship of Ukraine, was elected chairman of the Vinnytsia Regional Council.

Now he is actively involved in public activities, paying special attention to the regional organization of power: reforming local self-government and decentralization of state power, establishing international cooperation and European integration, as well as developing civil society.

== Political views ==
Since 1998, he began to study more deeply the issue of local government reform on the principles of decentralization of power and transfer of powers to the regions using the example of Poland.

Later, he took the experience of his Polish neighbors as a basis when developing his own Concept for reforming local self-government in Ukraine. Since 2000, Tatusyak has been a public figure.

In 2003, he created the Vinnytsia regional branch of the Ukraine-Poland society.

Over time, international activities expanded their boundaries and already in 2007, Tatusyak headed the International Public Organization “Ukraine-Poland-Germany”.

Today, as a result of the active work of the international society, more than 300 territorial communities of the Vinnytsia region have an international partner in Poland, Germany and other European countries. Almost 200 of them are agreements between communities of the Vinnytsia region and Poland. As part of this partnership, as well as within the framework of various projects, more than 200 delegations (more than 1000 participants) traveled to European countries in order to study European experience in various spheres of life. For his active public and government activities, since March 2008, Tatusyak has received membership in the Bureau of the European Association of Former Members of Parliament of Member States of the Council of Europe and the European Union.

== Family ==
He is married to Olena Ivanivna. They have two children.
