= Taxation in Ukraine =

The organization responsible for tax policy in Ukraine is the State Fiscal Service, operating under the Ministry of Finance of Ukraine. Taxation is legally regulated by the Taxation Code of Ukraine. The calendar year serves as a fiscal year in Ukraine. The most important sources of tax revenue in Ukraine are unified social security contributions, value added tax, individual income tax. In 2017 taxes collected formed 23% of GDP at ₴969.654 billion.

== Direct taxes ==
=== Individual Income tax ===
Individual Income Tax is derived from income of Ukrainian citizens and other individuals living in the country. Liability for personal income tax is mainly determined by the criterion of residency. A person who is a tax resident in Ukraine is required to pay personal income tax from their worldwide income, which is also called unlimited liability. Tax residency is determined by several factors, if an individual carries out one of them, they are considered a tax resident. The conditions are the following: residency in Ukraine, permanent residency in Ukraine in the case of living in another country, location of the centre of vital interest in the case of having permanent residency in more than country and location, where an individual resides at least 183 days in a year, in this case none of the above is applicable. A person who is not considered resident has only limited liability, so they have to pay taxes only from their incomes in Ukraine. Individual income tax in Ukraine is proportional tax. It can be 0%, 5%, 9%, 18% and it depends on the type of income. For example, the tax rate for employment income is 18%. In some cases the tax rate depends on the status of the taxpayer. For instance, income from selling real estate is taxed at a rate of 5% for residents and 18% for non-residents. In addition, on every individual’s income, which is taxable by Individual Income Tax, military tax is also imposed. Its rate is 1.5%.

=== Inheritance and Gift Tax ===
The rates of inheritance and gift tax in Ukraine depends on tax residency status of testate/giver and inheritor/recipient. In the case of gift tax, there are 4 options. If the recipient is a resident of Ukraine and first civil degree relative of giver, who is also resident of the country, the tax rate is 0%. If the recipient is resident and giver is resident and anyone but first civil degree relative, the tax rate is 5%. If the recipient is resident and giver is non-resident, the tax rate is 18%. If recipient is non-resident and receives some possession in Ukraine, the tax rate is also 18%. In every case recipient also have to pay military tax, which is at 1.5%, as on every other taxable income.

=== Corporate Income Tax ===
In case of Corporate Income Tax, taxation again depends on residency status. To be considered resident, legal entity must be registered in Ukraine and it must operate under Ukrainian laws. If these conditions are met, the legal entity is considered resident and their tax base for Corporate Income Tax is their worldwide income. Non-residents pay the tax only from income with origin in Ukraine, but not every kind of income is subject to the tax. Permanent establishment of non-residents are considered separate entity. Tax rate differs between these categories. For residents the tax rate is 18% with few exceptions. For example, insurance companies have to pay 0 to 3% of their income as a special corporate tax, that lowers taxable profit.

=== Net wealth tax ===
Ukraine does not impose net wealth tax.

=== Real property tax ===
The property tax is payable by individuals is the same as that which applies to corporations.

=== Social security contributions ===
Employers pay monthly unified social security contributions (USSC) equivalent to 22% of the gross salary of each employee, subject to an earnings cap.

== Indirect taxes ==
An indirect tax is collected by one entity in the supply chain (usually a producer or retailer) and paid to the government, but it is passed on to the consumer as part of the purchase price of a good or service. The consumer is ultimately paying the tax by paying more for the product.

=== Value added tax ===
Value added tax is levied on the supply of goods and service in Ukraine and on the import and export of goods and auxiliary services. Supplies to and from Crimea are treated as exports and imports for value added tax purposes. The standard VAT rate is 20% for domestic supplies and imported goods (including auxiliary services). A 7% rate applies to supplies of pharmaceuticals and healthcare products. Exported goods and auxiliary services are zero-rated. For VAT purposes, services that are included in the customs value of imported and exported goods are considered auxiliary services. Certain supplies are not subject to VAT, including: issues of securities; insurance services; reorganization of legal entities; transfers and returns of property under operating lease arrangements; currency exchange; and imports and exports with a custom value of less than 150 EUR. VAT-exempt supplies include published periodicals; student notebooks, textbooks, books and certain educational services; certain public transport services; the provision of software products (until January 1. 2023); and the provision of healthcare services by licensed institutions. Registration is required (for residents and non-residents) if value of taxable supplies of goods or services exceeds ₴1 million during any 12-month period. A legal entity may apply for voluntary registration if it has no VAT-able activities or if the volume of its VAT-able transactions is less than the registration threshold. Although not specifically provided for in the Tax Code, in practice a nonresident entity must register for Ukrainian VAT purposes via representative office (RO) and/or permanent establishment (PE) in Ukraine.

=== Real Estate Tax ===
Real Estate Tax is composed of 3 parts: land fee, immovable property tax and transport tax. Land fee can be further divided into land tax and land rent. Taxpayers of land tax are owners or users of land, both companies and individuals. Taxpayers of land rent, are renters of the land from state or communities. Land tax rate ranges between 1% and 5% of value of the land. Land rent can be at most 12% of the normative monetary value. Immovable property tax is levied on real estate, both commercial and residential, and it is paid by both companies and individuals. The land is excluded from the tax. The tax rate can be set at most at 1.5% of minimum wage for every square meter of the property. Owners of the cars, the value of which is more than ₴1.2 million and which are used less than 5 years, are required to pay transport tax. The cost is ₴25,000 for one car.

=== Capital tax ===
Ukraine does not impose capital tax.

=== Transfer tax ===
Ukraine does not impose transfer tax.

=== Stamp duty ===
Ukraine does not impose stamp duty.

== Withholding taxes ==
WHT must be remitted to the tax authorities no later than the date when the payment is made to the income recipient. Passive income (dividends, interest, royalties) from Ukrainian sources that is paid to non-resident entities is generally subject to 15% WHT. Other payments, including payments for engineering services, lease payments, and agency and brokerage fees, are also subject to 15% WHT, but payments for most other services are not subject to withholding. WHT rates may be reduced under a relevant tax treaty. The 15% WHT rate applies to income (rather than capital gain) on the sale of real estate and on profits from the sale of securities. Capital gains from disposal of interest-free (discounted) bonds and treasury bills are taxed at an 18% rate. Payments for freight services (including sea freight) are subject to 6% WHT. А special 5% WHT rate on qualifying Eurobond yield applies (including payment of interest to residents of low-tax jurisdictions). Interest payable under a syndicated loan through the organising bank can be subject to reduced WHT rates under the DTTs between Ukraine and the country of residence of each participating bank. The non-resident recipient of income sourced in Ukraine must also be considered the beneficial owner of such income in order to benefit from the reduced tax rates under relevant tax treaties. According to the Tax Code, agents, nominee holders, and other intermediaries in respect of received income cannot be beneficial owners of income sourced in Ukraine, and, therefore, are not entitled to favourable treaty provisions. Payments to non-resident persons for advertising services are not subject to withholding. However, the resident payer is required to pay, from its own funds, a 20% remittance tax based on the value of such services. A resident payer is similarly required to pay, from its own funds, a 12% remittance tax if a payment is made to a foreign insurer or reinsurer whose rating of financial reliability does not meet the requirements set by the authorised state agency. Otherwise, 0% or 4% rates apply. As taxes on advertising and insurance are levied on a resident party, they cannot be relieved using a tax treaty. A taxpayer under the simplified tax regime that distributes passive income to a non-resident or its designated entity (except to the non-resident’s PE in Ukraine) is obligated to withhold WHT at the moment of such payments

== Other Taxes ==
Other taxes collected in Ukraine include customs taxes, different types of rental duty and environmental tax. Customs taxes are mainly levied on imports and the rates mainly vary between 0% and 10%, although in some cases they can be higher. Rental duty taxes natural resources. Within its scope falls for instance extraction of mineral resources or using of radio sequences. Environmental tax taxes pollutants leaked into water and air and disposal of waste. The rates differ, depending on many different factors.
