= Maryna Poroshenko =

Former First Lady of Ukraine

- Марина Порошенко
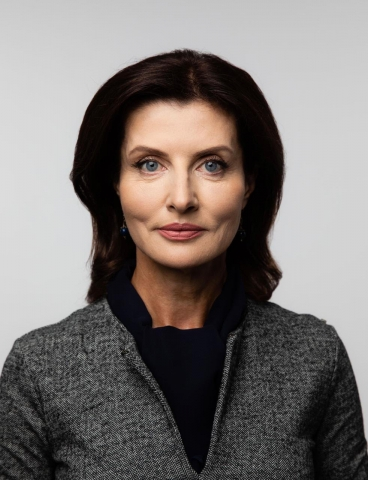
- Poroshenko in 2020

First Lady of Ukraine
- In role 7 June 2014 – 20 May 2019
- President: Petro Poroshenko
- Preceded by: Hanna Turchynova (Acting)
- Succeeded by: Olena Zelenska

Personal details
- Born: Maryna Anatoliivna Perevedentseva (Марина Анатоліївна Переведенцева); 1 February 1962 (age 64) Kyiv, Ukrainian SSR, Soviet Union
- Spouse: Petro Poroshenko (m. 1984)
- Children: 4, including Oleksii
- Education: Bogomolets National Medical University; National Academy of Government Managerial Staff of Culture and Arts
- Occupation: Medical doctor; politician

Maryna Anatoliyvna Poroshenko (Ukrainian: Марина Анатоліївна Порошенко, née Perevedentseva; (Note: Ukrainian: Переведенцева) born 1 February 1962) is a Ukrainian cardiologist who served as First Lady of Ukraine from 2014 to 2019, as wife of President Petro Poroshenko. After her husband's presidency ended in 2019, Poroshenko was a political candidate for the local election in Kyiv, she subsequently was elected to the Kyiv City Council in 2020.

== Biography ==
Maryna Poroshenko was born as Maryna Perevedentseva (Ukrainian: Марина Анатоліївна Переведенцева, romanized: Maryna Anatoliivna Perevedenceva) in 1962 in Kyiv, Ukrainian SSR, Soviet Union. Her father Anatoly (born 1933) was Deputy Minister of Health of the Ukrainian SSR. Her mother Lyudmyla worked at Kyiv Arsenal.

While studying at the Bogomolets National Medical University, she met Petro Poroshenko at a disco. They married in 1984. She worked as a cardiologist at the Zhovtneva Hospital until the birth of their first son, and after that, she devoted her time to her family. She does not take part in public life and does not discuss politics with her husband. She participates in the activities of the Petro Poroshenko Charity Foundation.

In 2007 she graduated from National Academy of Government Managerial Staff of Culture and Arts with degree in fine arts.

In a June 2014 televised interview, Maryna said that she plans to engage in social and cultural issues currently facing Ukraine. Late June 2014 she met with Iryna Herashchenko, an envoy to the Peace plan for Eastern Ukraine and a mediator in the war in Donbas. They discussed possible assistance to the people in Eastern Ukraine.

From 2018 until 2019 she served as the Chairman of Ukrainian Cultural Foundation.

In the 2020 Kyiv local election Poroshenko is placed first on the Kyiv City Council election list of the party European Solidarity (the party (nationwide) led by her husband Petro Poroshenko). In the election of Mayor of Kyiv (during the 2020 Kyiv local election) European Solidarity endorsed incumbent mayor Vitaly Klichko (who was nominated by the UDAR party). European Solidarity won 31 Kyiv City Council seats in the 2020 Kyiv local election. Klitschko was reelected as Mayor of Kyiv.

== Family ==
Maryna and Petro Poroshenko have four children: son Olexiy (born 1985), twin daughters Yevheniia and Oleksandra (born 2000) and son Mykhailo (born 2001). The family continues to live in their private home in the historic neighborhood of Koncha-Zaspa. Oleksii was a representative in the regional parliament of Vinnytsia Oblast. In November 2014, he became People's Deputy of Ukraine.

Former Ukrainian president Viktor Yushchenko is the godfather to their children.

== Notes ==
Honorary titles
| Preceded by Hanna Turchynova; Acting | First Lady of Ukraine; 2014–2019 | Succeeded by Olena Zelenska |
