= Hennadiy Balashov =

Ukrainian businessman and politician (1961–2025)

- Геннадій Балашов
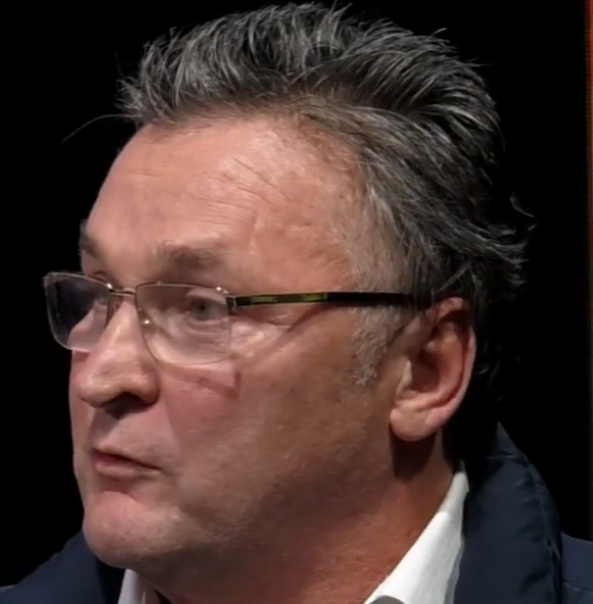
- Balashov in March 2020

People's Deputy of Ukraine
- In office 12 May 1998 – April 2002

Personal details
- Born: Hennadiy Viktorovych Balashov; 20 February 1961 Dnipropetrovsk, Ukrainian SSR, Soviet Union
- Died: 11 November 2025 (aged 64)
- Party: The Libertarian party 5.10
- Education: Dnipropetrovsk National University
- Occupation: Politician; businessman
- Profession: Economist
- Website: www.balashov.com.ua

YouTube information
- Channel: Геннадий Балашов
- Years active: 2011–2025
- Subscribers: 352 thousand
- Views: 67 million
- Last updated: October 29, 2024

Hennadiy Viktorovych Balashov (Ukrainian: Геннадій Вікторович Балашов, 20 February 1961 – 11 November 2025) was a Ukrainian businessman, blogger, politician and leader of 5.10 political party. He was an advocate of a radical reform of Ukraine's tax system, so-called "Tax Paradise for humanity".

== Life and career ==
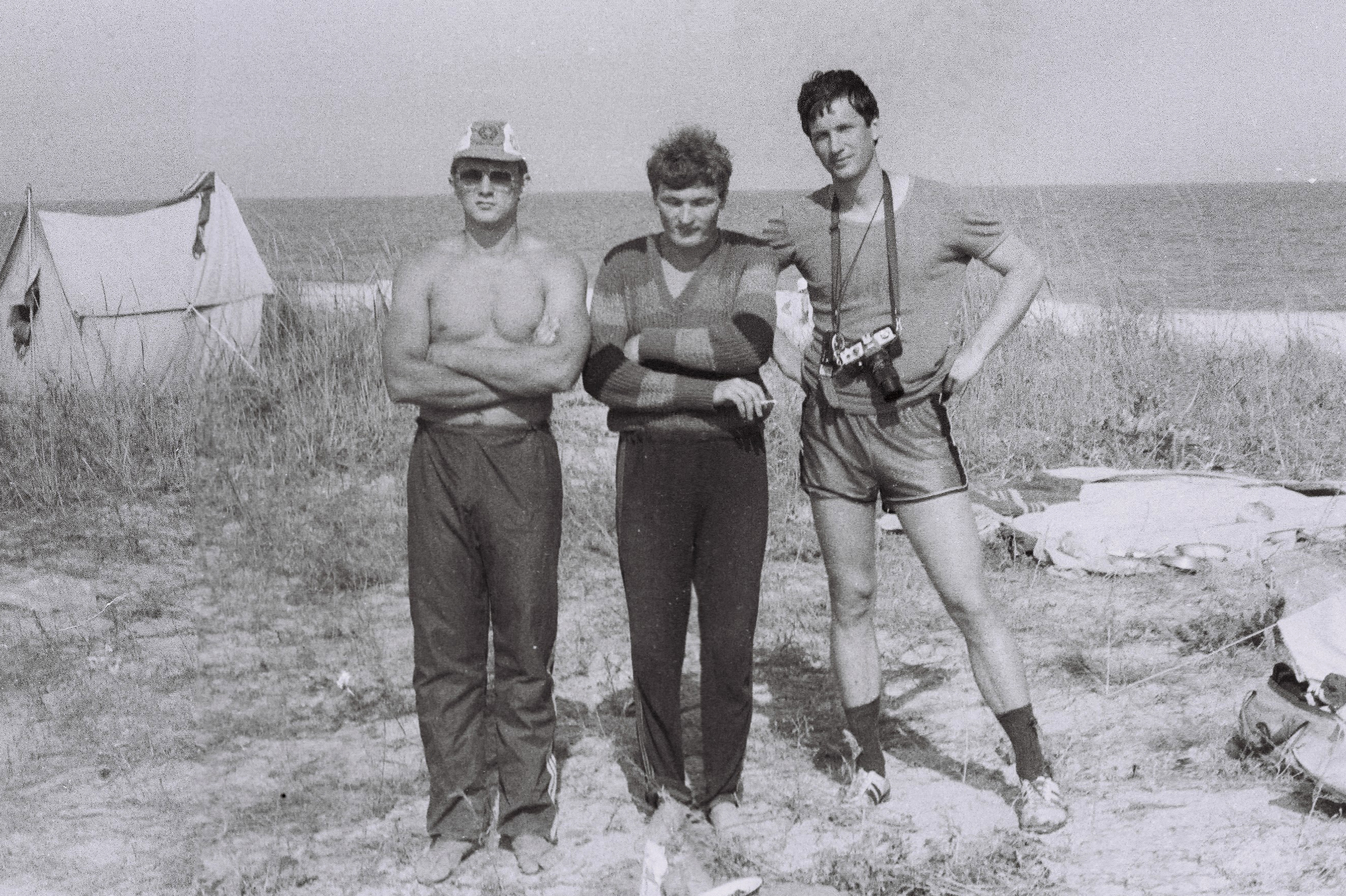
Yuri Elistratov, Balashov, and Vadim Chuprina, Sea of Azov, in 1989

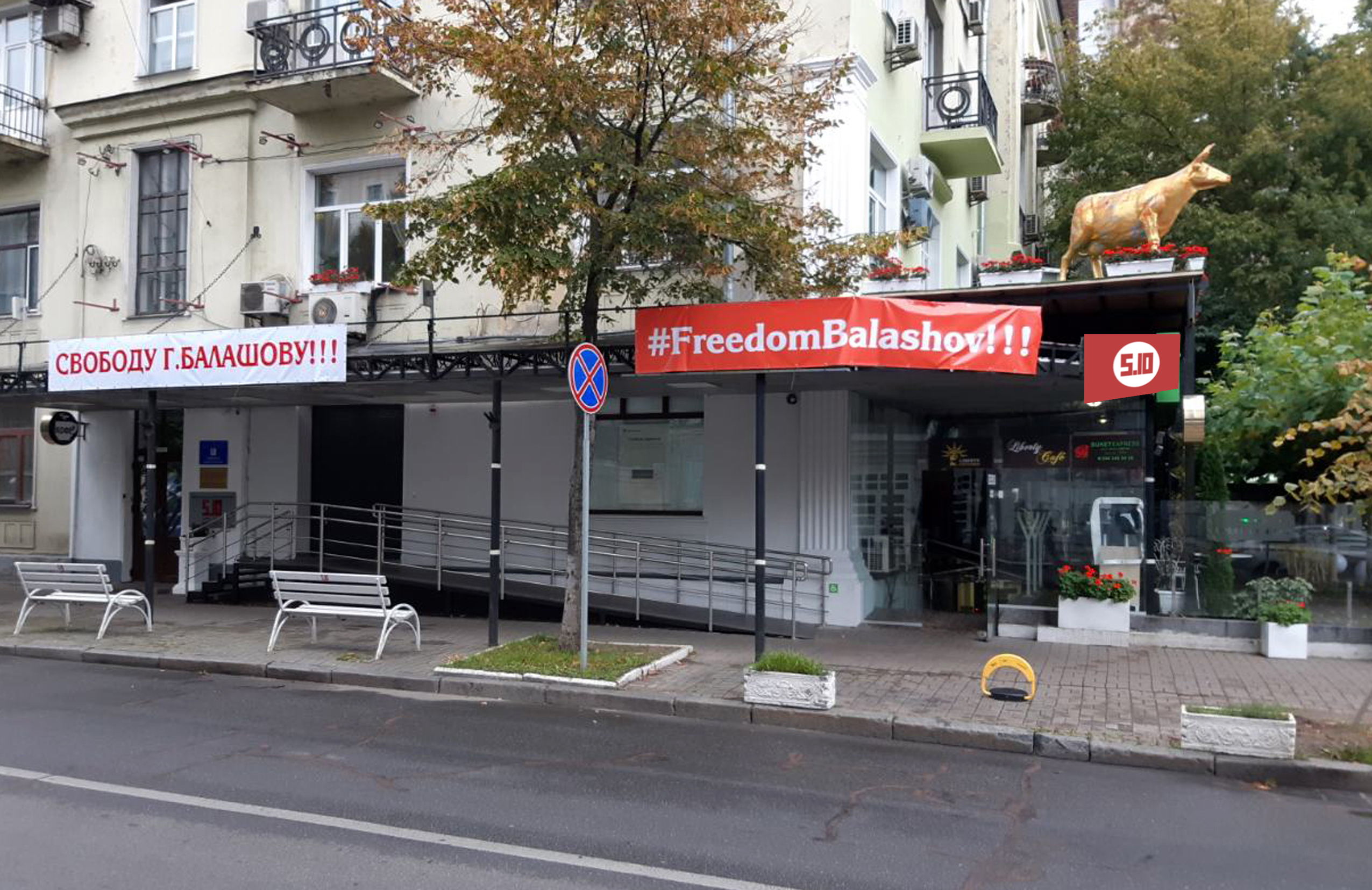
5.10 party office, Kyiv, Ukraine, September 2021

During Euromaidan events, Balashov sided with the protesters and was actively campaigning for his ideas, calling for the introduction of 5.10 system. At the beginning of March, as the crisis in Crimea was deepening, he travelled to Simferopol, but was kidnapped by allegedly local self-defense forces. Upon his release and return to Kyiv, Balashov said that he was kidnapped, robbed and was being beaten for eight hours by local bandits.

On 10 March 2014, on the stage of Euromaidan, Balashov stated that "Putin has started a war" against Ukraine, and the only way to stop the war was to shut off the supply of Russian gas to Europe through the territory of Ukraine, for which he called on those present to "blow up the pipe." On March 12, 2014, the Investigative Committee of Russia opened a criminal case against Balashov for public calls to kill Russians and declared him wanted internationally.

=== 2014 Ukrainian presidential election ===
In the early elections of the President of Ukraine in 2014, Balashov and his party "5.10" supported Petro Poroshenko in order not to let Yulia Tymoshenko win the election.

=== 2019 Ukrainian presidential election ===
On 19 September 2018, Balashov announced his intention to nominate his candidature for the presidential election of Ukraine on 31 March 2019. Balashov urged party members and party supporters to finance his election campaign through contributions to the party account. The reports of the party indicated that at the beginning of 2019 1.2 million UAH were collected. This is 47% of the collateral (UAH 2.5 million), which should be submitted by the candidate to the CEC for registration. Balashov pledged to add the rest of his own money.

On 15 January, registration documents were submitted to the CEC. On 18 January, the CEC approved the candidate.

=== Personal life and death ===
Balashov had a wife and three children. He died on 11 November 2025, at the age of 64.

== Scandals ==
=== Criminal case ===
On 22 January 2021 the National Police of Ukraine opened a criminal case against Balashov as he received funds totaling $28,000 as an investment in the construction of an elite apartment building. However, after the house was built, he did not give the investors their funds, but instead began to lease the premises of the house for office rent.

=== Illegal construction of the New York Building in the UNESCO protected zone ===
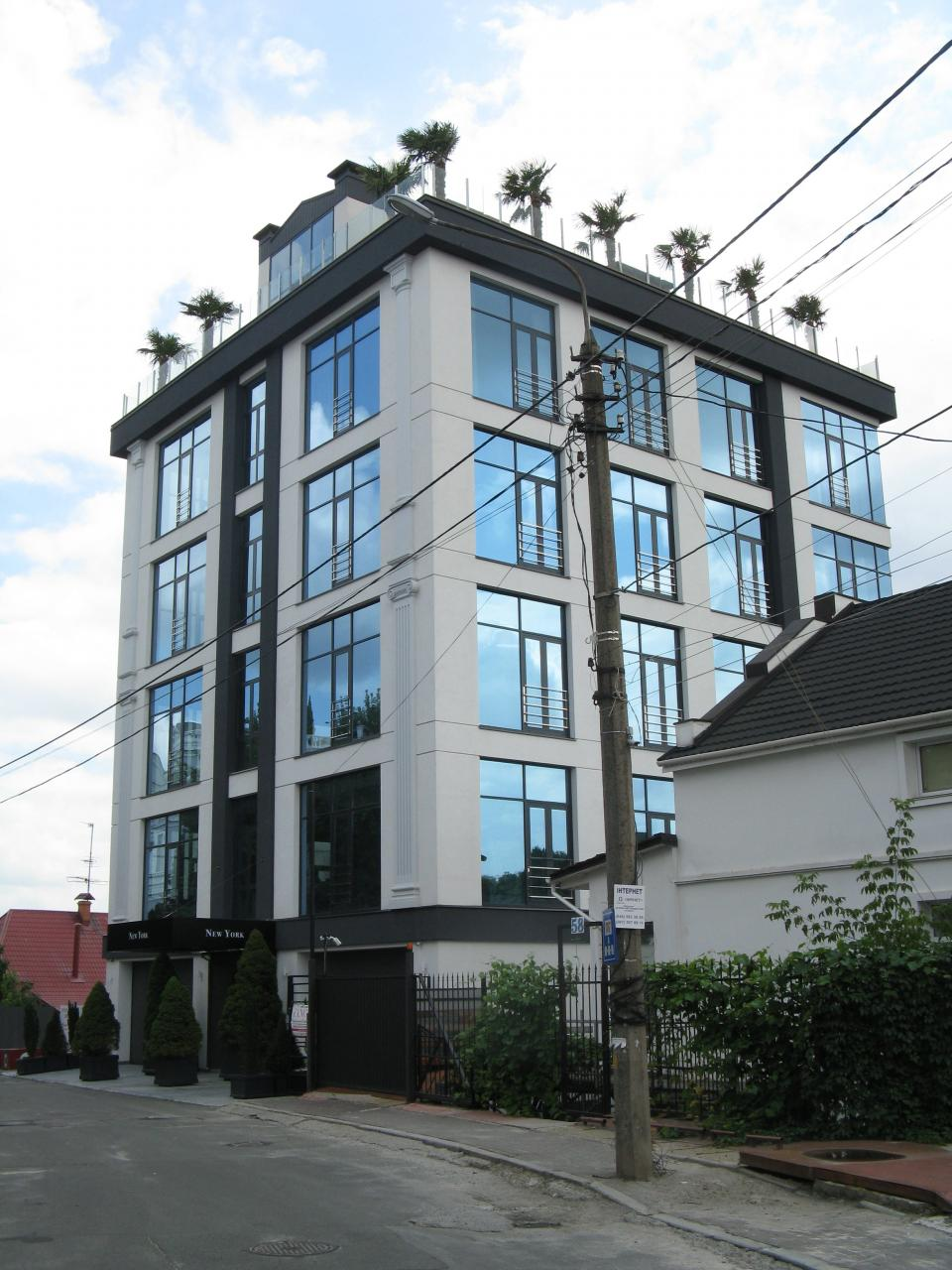
House New York

Boryslav Bereza claims that erection of a house by Balashov in the buffer zone of the UNESCO World Heritage Site "St. Sophia Cathedral and Adjacent Monasteries, Kyiv-Pechersk Lavra" caused a high resonance in society. Architects and archaeologists, including a representative of the Institute of Archeology of the National Academy of Sciences of Ukraine, said that Balashov built his house with numerous violations, which gives UNESCO the full right to exclude the Cathedral of St. Sophia and the adjacent monastic structures, the Kyiv-Pechersk Lavra from the list of World Heritage Sites.

The New York House is a residential building located in Kyiv at 60 Redutna Street. The building was constructed in 2015 with the involvement of businessman Hennadiy Balashov. The house has a total project area of 2333.3 m^{2} and consists of 8 apartments with an average area of 140 m^{2}. Construction on Redutna Street has faced significant criticism from the community due to numerous violations of building codes and legislation, particularly in an area of historical and cultural value. According to Ukrainian cultural heritage protection legislation, high-rise construction is prohibited here; however, despite this, new residential complexes have begun to appear in this area. As of 2021, the construction of the New York Club House and other projects on Redutna Street are under scrutiny and protests from local residents concerned about potential safety and stability issues for neighboring buildings due to possible landslides.

==== Balashov's position ====
Balashov denied the accusations and expressed the opinion that the opening of the criminal case is an attempt at blackmail by law enforcement to extort money. According to him, investigative bodies, in cooperation with the prosecutor's office and Kyiv authorities, are pressuring businessmen and illegally interfering in entrepreneurial activities under the guise of criminal investigations.

The prosecutor's office together with the police feeds off the [Tsarskoye Selo (Kyiv)], terrorizes entrepreneurs, and engages in wrongdoing along with the entire Kyiv authorities. And the case they are accusing me of is regarding the demolition of a monument. But which monument I demolished, they have not been able to establish for five years.

— Gennadiy Balashov

=== Language statements ===
During the discussion of the Ukrainian language legislature at one of the all-Ukrainian TV channels, Balashov said that he spoke Russian out of principle.

== Bibliography ==
- "How to become an adventurer. Reflections of a millionaire "(2011)
- "The monarchy of the entrepreneur. How to become king? "(2014)

== Awards and honors ==
- Awarded the Order of Merit of the III degree.
