= Our Ukraine =

Our Ukraine (Ukrainian: Наша Україна — Nasha Ukraina or Nasha Ukrayina) is a popular political name in Ukraine during the Orange Revolution.

Our Ukraine may refer to:

- Reforms and Order Party (before 2005)
- Our Ukraine (political party) (after 2005)
- Our Ukraine Bloc for the Ukrainian parliamentary election, 2006
  - for the 2002 Ukrainian parliamentary election, Bloc of Viktor Yushchenko "Our Ukraine"
  - for the Ukrainian parliamentary election, 2007, Our Ukraine–People's Self-Defense Bloc
