= Vinnytsia Oblast Council =

Legislature of Vinnytsia Oblast, Ukraine

Type
- Type: Unicameral
- Houses: 1

Leadership
- Speaker: Vyacheslav Sokolovy

Structure
- Seats: 84
- Political groups: Government (51): Ukrainian Strategy of Groysman (40); Batkivshchyna (11); Opposition (46): European Solidarity (11); Servant of the People (8); Restoration of Ukraine (7) (Note: Former members of the Opposition Platform — For Life, which has been banned since 2022.); For the Future (7)

Elections
- Last election: 25 October 2020

Meeting place
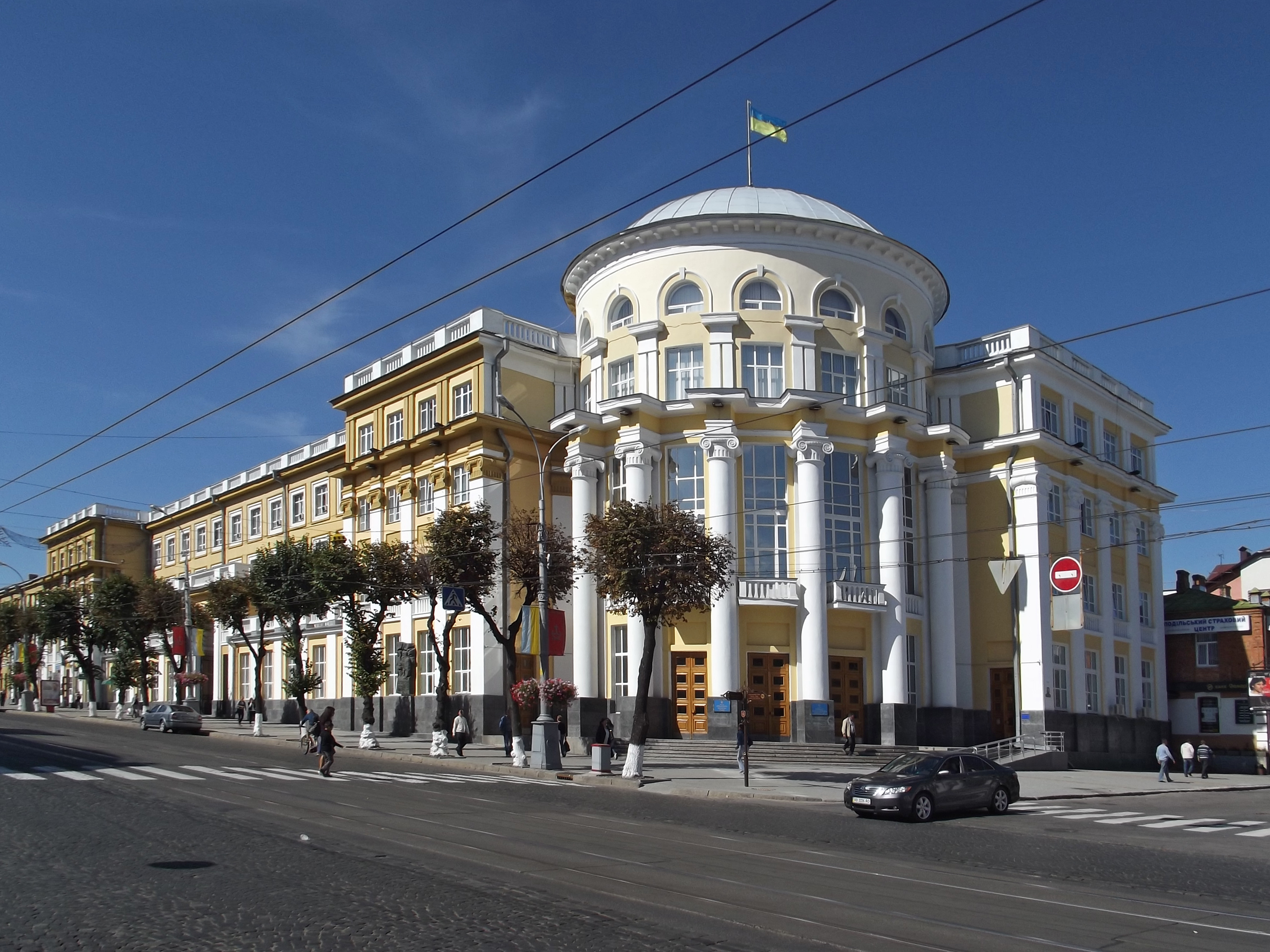
- Vinnytsia, Vinnytsia Oblast

Website
- http://www.vinrada.gov.ua/main.htm

The Vinnytsia Oblast Council (Ukrainian: Вінницька обласна рада) is the regional oblast council (parliament) of the Vinnytsia Oblast (province) located in western Ukraine.

Council members are elected for five year terms. In order to gain representation in the council, a party must gain more than 5 percent of the total vote.

As of August 2025, the coalition includes "Hroisman's Ukrainian Strategy" (39 deputies) and "Batkivshchyna" (11 deputies). The opposition consists of "EU" (11 deputies), "Servant of the People" (8 deputies), "For the Future" (7 deputies), "Restorement of Ukraine" (7 deputies) and one non-factional deputy.

== Recent elections ==
=== 2020 ===
Distribution of seats after the 2020 Ukrainian local elections

- 40 Ukrainian Strategy Groysman
- 11 European Solidarity
- 11 Fatherland
- 8 Servant of the People
- 7 Opposition Platform — For Life
- 7 For the Future

Election date was 25 October 2020

=== 2015 ===
Distribution of seats after the 2015 Ukrainian local elections

- 27 Solidarity
- 17 Fatherland
- 9 Radical Party
- 7 Self Reliance
- 6 Svoboda
- 6 Agrarian Party
- 6 Opposition Bloc
- 6 UKROP

Election date was 25 October 2015

== Chairmen ==
=== Regional executive committee ===
- Alexander Lisovik (1932)
- Alexei Trilissky (1932–1937)
- Stepan Goryanoy (1937)
- Ivan Malyutin (acting, 1937–1938)
- Luka Kozis (acting, 1938)
- Mikhail Godov (1938–1941, 1944–1945)
- Dmitry Burchenko (1945–1948)
- Georgy Dementyev (1948–1956)
- Markiyan Slobodyanyuk (1956–1963)
- Markiyan Slobodyanyuk (1963–1964, agrarian)
- Dmitry Slobodyanyuk (1963–1964; industrial)
- Markiyan Slobodyanyuk (1954–1966)
- Leonid Bugayenko (1966–1967)
- Vasily Taratuta (1967–1970)
- Vasily Kavun (1970–1978)
- Vasily Temny (1978–1986)
- Mykola Didyk (1986–1992)

=== Regional council ===
- Arkadiy Nekhayevsky (1990–1991)
- Mykola Didyk (1991–1992)
- Polikarp Tkach (1992–1994)
- Mykola Melnyk (1994–1996)
- Ivan Bondarchuk (1997–1998)
- Hryhoriy Kaletnik (1998–2002)
- Yuriy Ivanov (2002–2006)
- Hryhoriy Zabolotnyi (2006–2010)
- Serhiy Tatusyak (2010–2014)
- Serhiy Svitko (2014–2015)
- Anatoliy Oliynyk (2015–2020)
- Vyacheslav Sokolovyi (since 2020)
